= Schweigaard's cabinet =

Schweigaard's cabinet, often referred to as the April Ministerium, was an interlude lasting from 3 April to 26 June 1884, following the impeachment of the Selmer cabinet, and prior to Sverdrup's Liberal cabinet.

== Cabinet ==
Cabinet
Portfolio	Minister	Took office	Left office	Party
Prime Minister; Minister of Auditing	Christian Homann Schweigaard	3 April 1884	26 June 1884	Independent
Prime Minister of Norway in Stockholm	Carl Otto Løvenskiold	3 April 1884	26 June 1884	Independent
Minister of Finance and Customs	Herman Reimers	3 April 1884	26 June 1884	Independent
Minister of Justice and the Police	Ludvig Aubert	3 April 1884	26 June 1884	Independent
Minister of the Interior	Thomas Cathinco Bang	3 April 1884	26 June 1884	Independent
Minister of Education and Church Affairs	Nils Hertzberg	3 April 1884	26 June 1884	Independent
Minister of the Army	Lars Christian Dahll	3 April 1884	26 June 1884	Independent
Minister of the Navy	Halfdan Lehmann	3 April 1884	3 May 1884	Independent
Minister of the Navy	Johan Koren	3 May 1884	26 June 1884	Independent
Members of the Council State Division in Stockholm	Jacob Lerche Johansen	3 April 1884	20 May 1884	Independent
Members of the Council State Division in Stockholm	Ebbe C. Hornemann Hertzberg	20 May 1884	26 June 1884	Independent

Preceded by Selmer's Cabinet	Cabinets of Norway; April-June 1884	Succeeded by Sverdrup's Cabinet
