= Selmer's Cabinet =

Norwegian government

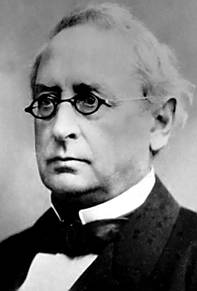
Christian Selmer

The Selmer Cabinet governed Norway between 11 October 1880 and 1 March 1884. It was led by Christian Selmer. All but three of the cabinet's ministers were impeached after a dispute about whether or not the cabinet should be required to meet in the Storting. This decision effectively led to the introduction of parliamentarism in Norway. The impeachment of the Selmer Cabinet was also the last time a Norwegian politician was convicted after being impeached, as Prime Minister Abraham Berge was found not guilty after his 1926 impeachment.

== Cabinet Members ==
Portfolio	Minister	Period	Party
Prime Minister	Christian August Selmer		Conservative
Prime Minister in Stockholm	Otto Richard Kierulf		Independent
Member of the Council of State Division in Stockholm	Ole Andreas Bachke	– 15 November 1881	Independent
Member of the Council of State Division in Stockholm	Rasmus Tønder Nissen	15 November 1880 – 15 October 1881	Independent
Member of the Council of State Division in Stockholm	Jacob Lerche Johansen	11 November 1881 – 15 September 1882	Independent
Member of the Council of State Division in Stockholm	Christian Homann Schweigaard	15 September 1882 – 15 September 1883	Conservative
Member of the Council of State Division in Stockholm	Niels Petersen Vogt	15 September 1882 – 15 September 1883	Independent
Member of the Council of State Division in Stockholm	Jens Holmboe	15 September 1883 – 26 March 1884	Conservative
Member of the Council of State Division in Stockholm	Henrik Laurentius Helliesen	15 September 1883 – 26 March 1884	Conservative
Member of the Council of State Division in Stockholm	Nils Christian Egede Hertzberg	26 March – 3 April 1884	Conservative
Minister of the Army	Adolph Frederik Munthe		Independent
Minister of the Navy	Jacob Lerche Johansen	– 11 November 1881, 15 September 1882 - 21 March 1884	Independent
Minister of the Navy	Jens Holmboe	15 November 1881 - 15 September 1882	Conservative
Minister of Finance and Customs	Henrik Laurentius Helliesen	– 15 September 1883	Conservative
Minister of Finance and Customs	Christian Homann Schweigaard	15 September 1883 - 3 April 1884	Conservative
Minister of Auditing	Christian Jensen	– 22 December 1880	Independent
Minister of Auditing	Christian Homann Schweigaard	22 December 1880 - 16 September 1881, 26 September 1881 - September 1882	Conservative
Minister of Auditing	Frederik Christian Stoud Platou	16 - 26 September 1881	Independent
Minister of Auditing	Ole Andreas Bachke	September 1882 - 26 March 1884	Independent
Minister of Auditing	Johan Christian Collett	26 March - 3 April 1884	Independent
Minister of the Interior	Nils Vogt	– 15 September 1882, 15 September 1883 - 21 March 1884	Conservative
Minister of the Interior	Christian Jensen	15 September 1882 – 15 September 1883	Independent
Minister of Justice and the Police	Christian Jensen	– 15 September 1881, 15 September 1883 - 26 March 1884	Independent
Minister of Justice and the Police	Christian Homann Schweigaard	15 November 1881 - 15 November 1881	Conservative
Minister of Justice and the Police	Ole Andreas Bachke	15 November 1881 - 15 September 1882	Independent
Minister of Justice and the Police	Jens Holmboe	15 September 1882 - 15 September 1883	Conservative
Minister of Church and Education	Rasmus Tønder Nissen	– 15 November 1880, 15 October 1881 - 19 January 1882	Independent
Minister of Church and Education	Jens Holboe	15 November 1880 - 16 September 1881	Conservative
Minister of Church and Education	Halfdan Lehmann	16 September 1881 - 15 October 1881, 29 March - 3 April 1884	Independent
Minister of Church and Education	Nils Christian Egede Hertzberg	30 January 1882 - 21 March 1884	Conservative
Minister of Church and Education	Henrik Laurentius Helliesen	21 March 1884 - 29 March 1884	Conservative
