= Minister of Auditing =

The Norwegian Minister of Auditing was the head of the Norwegian Ministry of Auditing. The position existed from 1822 to 1918.

== List of Norwegian Ministers of Auditing ==
Name	From	To
Peter Motzfeldt	1822	1824
Thomas Fasting	1824	1824
Hans Hagerup Falbe	1824	1825
Peter Motzfeldt	1825	1828
Hans Hagerup Falbe	1828	1829
Peter Motzfeldt	1829	1831
Nicolai Krog	1831	1832
Valentin Sibbern	1832	1832
Peter Motzfeldt	1832	1834
Valentin Sibbern	1834	1835
Peter Motzfeldt	1835	1837
Nicolai Krog	1837	1838
Oluf Borch de Schouboe	1838	1839
Nicolai Krog	1839	1841
Oluf Borch de Schouboe	1841	1842
Nicolai Krog	1842	1845
Valentin Sibbern	1845	1846
Nicolai Krog	1846	1848
Valentin Sibbern	1848	1849
Nicolai Krog	1849	1850
Jørgen Herman Vogt	1850	1851
Nicolai Krog	1851	1852
Hans Riddervold	1852	1852
Nicolai Krog	1852	1852
Poul Christian Holst (acting)	1852	1853
Nicolai Krog	1853	1855
Erik Røring Møinichen	1855	1855
Christian Bretteville	1855	1856
August Christian Manthey	1856	1856
Christian Ludvig Diriks (acting)	1856	1856
Jørgen Herman Vogt	1856	1857
Christian Ludvig Diriks (acting)	1857	1857
Jørgen Herman Vogt	1857	1858
Christian Birch-Reichenwald	1858	1859
Hans Christian Petersen	1859	1861
Hans Riddervold	1861	1861
Frederik Stang	1861	1868
Erik Røring Møinichen	1868	1869
Frederik Stang	1869	1873
Jacob Aall (acting)	1873	1875
Frederik Christian Stoud Platou (acting)	1875	1875
Jacob Aall (acting)	1875	1875
Frederik Christian Stoud Platou (acting)	1875	1875
Jacob Aall (acting)	1875	1879
Christian August Selmer	1879	1879
Christian Jensen	1879	1880
Christian Homann Schweigaard	1880	1881
Frederik Christian Stoud Platou (acting)	1881	1881
Christian Homann Schweigaard	1881	1882
Ole Bachke	1882	1884
Johan Christian Collett (acting)	1884	1884
Christian Homann Schweigaard	1884	1884
Johan Sverdrup	1884	1884
Birger Kildal	1884	1886
Jakob Sverdrup	1886	1888
Lars Knutson Liestøl	1888	1889
Peter Olrog Schjøtt	1889	1889
Emil Stang	1889	1891
Hans Hein Theodor Nysom	1891	1891
Thomas von Westen Engelhart	1891	1892
Jacob Otto Lange	1892	1893
Emil Stang	1893	1894
Ole Andreas Furu	1894	1895
Johannes Winding Harbitz	1895	1895
Fredrik Stang Lund	1895	1896
Harald Smedal	1896	1897
Francis Hagerup	1897	1898
Johannes Steen	1898	1900
Ole Anton Qvam	1900	1900
Wollert Konow (H)	1900	1903
Gunnar Knudsen	1903	1903
Otto Blehr	1903	1903
Birger Kildal	1903	1904
Paul Benjamin Vogt	1904	1905
Gunnar Knudsen	1905	1905
Harald Bothner	1905	1905
Christian Michelsen	1905	1907
Sven Aarrestad	1907	1908
Gunnar Knudsen	1908	1910
Wollert Konow (SB)	1910	1912
Jens Bratlie	1912	1913
Gunnar Knudsen	1913	1918
