= Peder Carl Lasson =

Norwegian jurist and politician

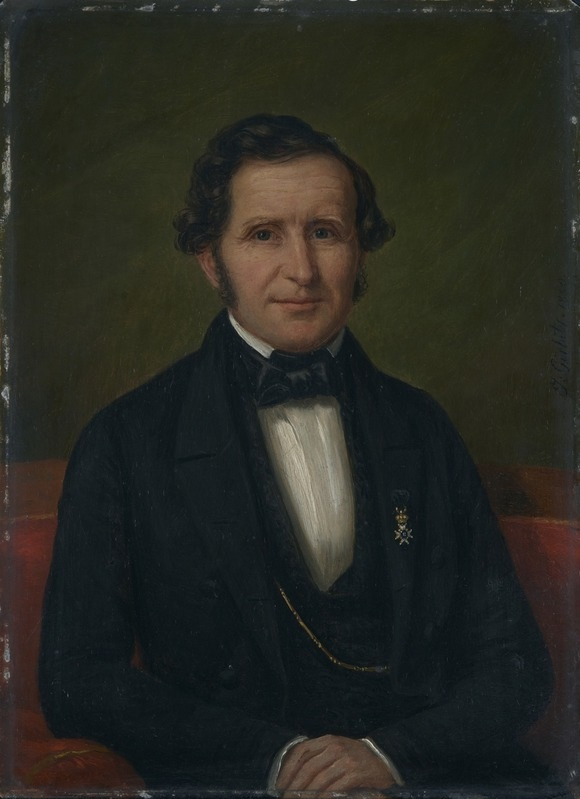
Peder Carl Lasson

Peder Carl Lasson (14 November 1798 – 5 June 1873) was a Norwegian jurist and politician. He served as Chief Justice of the Supreme Court of Norway from 1855 to 1873.

He was born in rural Bærum in Akershus, Norway. He was the son of Niels Quist Lasson (1762-1853) and Barbara Christiane Bremer (1773-1833). He went on the Christiania Cathedral School (now Oslo Cathedral School). He studied at the newly founded University of Christiania (now University of Oslo). He graduated with a degree in law during 1822.

He received a license as a barrister and began a career in law, being appointed Supreme Court judge in 1828, Supreme Court assessor in 1837 and district stipendiary magistrate (sorenskriver) of Aker in 1848.He had many law-related publications to his name. He was acting Minister of Justice and the Police from July to September 1852 and October 1852 to April 1853, as a member of the interim governments. Such interim governments were established when King Oscar I of Sweden travelled abroad or was ill.

Lasson was appointed successor to Chief Justice Georg Jacob Bull, who died in 1854. Lasson served as the fifth Chief Justice of the Supreme Court of Norway from 1855 to 1873.

Legal offices
Preceded by Søren Sørenssen	Norwegian Minister of Justice and the Police (acting); July 1852–September 1852	Succeeded by Søren Sørenssen
Preceded by Søren Sørenssen	Norwegian Minister of Justice and the Police (acting); 1852–1853	Succeeded by Søren Sørenssen
Preceded by Georg Jacob Bull	Chief Justice of the Supreme Court of Norway; 1855–1873	Succeeded by Hans G. C. Meldahl
