= Olaus Michael Schmidt =

Norwegian judge and politician

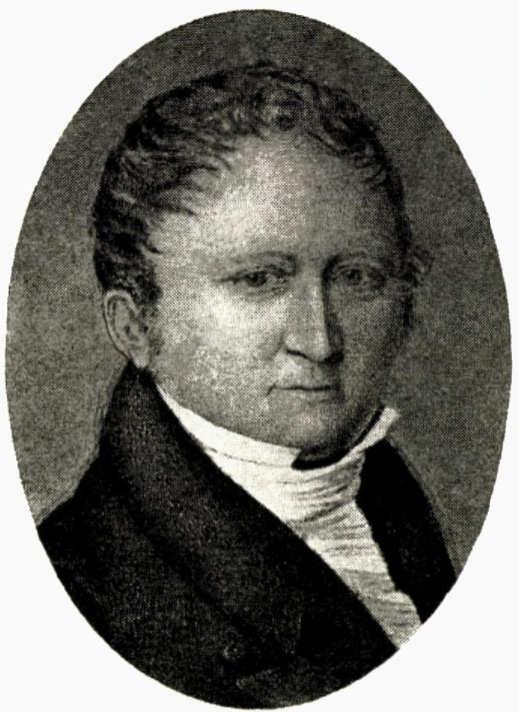
Olaus Michael Schmidt

Olaus Michael Schmidt (11 July 1784 – 5 July 1851) was a Norwegian judge and politician. A Supreme Court Assessor by profession, he served one term in the Norwegian Parliament, and was the Minister of Justice and the Police for four non-consecutive terms between 1838 and 1848.

== Personal life ==
Schmidt was born in Trondhjem as the son of Claus Pedersen Schmidt and Johanne Christine Beck. Claus was originally from Flensborg in Slesvig. Olaus had several brothers, including the Constitutional Founding Father Peter Schmidt, Jr.

In 1816 he married Sophie Magdalene Carite Sommerfeldt, who hailed from Østre Toten. She was the daughter of Christian Sommerfeldt and Anna Sophie Hagerup. On the paternal side she was a niece of politician Ole Hannibal Sommerfeldt and an aunt of Karl Linné Sommerfeldt and priest and politician Christian Sommerfeldt. On the maternal side she was a first cousin of Wolfgang Wenzel von Haffner.

== Career ==
Olaus Michael Schmidt enrolled as a student in 1801, and graduated with the cand.theol. degree in 1806. He was hired as a school teacher, but left this job in 1810 to study law at the University of Copenhagen. He graduated with the cand.jur. degree in 1812. He became an assessor in the district court of Christianssand in 1817, and was promoted to Chief Justice at the same place in 1828. He had been elected to the Parliament of Norway in 1827, to represent his city. He only served one term. In 1829 he became national Supreme Court Assessor.

However, he was not finished on national political scene. On 22 January 1838 he was appointed Minister of Justice and the Police. He held this post until 1 July the same year, when he was appointed as a member of the Council of State Division in Stockholm. On 1 August 1839 he returned as Minister of Justice. On 1 September 1842 he returned to serve one year in Stockholm. He then got his third spell as Minister of Justice from 1 September 1843 to 1 April 1845. One final tenure in Stockholm followed; he then returned to Norway to become Minister of Finance and Customs from 1 May 1846 to 1 July 1847, and then Minister of Justice for the fourth time, from 1847 to 18 April 1848. He then retired.

Olaus Michael Schmidt died in 1851 in Töplitz, three years after the death of his wife.

Political offices
Preceded by Poul Christian Holst	Norwegian Minister of Justice and the Police; January 1838–June 1838	Succeeded by Valentin Sibbern
Preceded by Valentin Sibbern	Norwegian Minister of Justice and the Police; 1839–1842	Succeeded by Valentin Sibbern
Preceded by Valentin Sibbern	Norwegian Minister of Justice and the Police; 1843–1845	Succeeded by Hans Christian Petersen
Preceded by Jørgen Herman Vogt	Norwegian Minister of Finance and Customs; 1846–1847	Succeeded by Jørgen Herman Vogt
Preceded by Hans Christian Petersen	Norwegian Minister of Justice and the Police; 1847–1848	Succeeded by Søren Sørenssen
