= Minister of Justice and Public Security =

Norwegian cabinet position

In Norway, the Minister of Justice and Public Security is the head of the Royal Norwegian Ministry of Justice and the Police and a member of Government of Norway. The current minister is Astri Aas-Hansen.

Until 1 January 2012 the post was named the Minister of Justice and the Police.

== List of ministers ==
Key
Agrarian / Centre Party
Conservative Party
Coalition Party
Christian Democratic Party
Independent
Labour Party
Liberal Party
National Unification
Progress Party

=== 2nd Ministry (justice affairs) (1814–1818) ===
Photo	Name	Party	Took office	Left office	Tenure	Cabinet
	Mathias Sommerhielm	Independent	27 November 1814	15 June 1815	200 days	Wedel I
	Christian Adolph Diriks	Independent	15 June 1815	15 September 1816	1 year, 93 days	Wedel I
	Mathias Sommerhielm	Independent	15 September 1816	15 May 1817	242 days	Wedel I
	Christian Adolph Diriks	Independent	15 May 1817	15 October 1817	153 days	Wedel I
	Christian Krohg	Independent	15 November 1817	4 March 1818	109 days	Wedel I
	Christian Adolph Diriks	Independent	4 March 1818	1 January 1819	303 days	Wedel I

=== Ministry of Justice and the Police (1819–1945) ===
Photo	Name	Party	Took office	Left office	Tenure	Cabinet
	Christian Adolph Diriks	Independent	1 January 1819	16 September 1825	6 years, 258 days	Wedel I
	Poul Christian Holst	Independent	16 September 1825	15 September 1826	364 days	Wedel I
	Jørgen Herman Vogt	Independent	15 September 1826	15 September 1827	1 year, 0 days	Wedel I
	Poul Christian Holst	Independent	15 September 1827	15 August 1832	4 years, 335 days	Wedel I
	Vilhelm Sibbern	Independent	15 August 1832	15 August 1833	1 year, 0 days	Wedel I
	Poul Christian Holst	Independent	15 August 1833	15 June 1836	2 years, 305 days	Wedel I
	Vilhelm Sibbern	Independent	15 June 1836	15 June 1837	1 year, 0 days	Wedel I-II
	Andreas Arntzen	Independent	15 June 1837	15 August 1837	61 days	Wedel II
	Poul Christian Holst	Independent	15 August 1837	21 January 1838	159 days	Wedel II
	Olaus Michael Schmidt	Independent	22 January 1838	15 July 1838	174 days	Wedel II
	Vilhelm Sibbern	Independent	15 July 1838	15 August 1839	1 year, 31 days	Wedel II
	Olaus Michael Schmidt	Independent	15 August 1839	15 September 1842	3 years, 31 days	Wedel II
	Vilhelm Sibbern	Independent	15 September 1842	15 September 1843	1 year, 0 days	Wedel II
	Olaus Michael Schmidt	Independent	15 September 1843	15 April 1845	1 year, 212 days	Wedel II; Løvenskiold/Vogt
	Hans Christian Petersen	Independent	15 April 1845	15 July 1847	2 years, 91 days	Løvenskiold/Vogt
	Olaus Michael Schmidt	Independent	15 July 1847	19 April 1848	279 days	Løvenskiold/Vogt
	Søren Sørenssen	Independent	19 April 1848	1 September 1850	2 years, 135 days	Løvenskiold/Vogt
	Hans Christian Petersen	Independent	1 September 1850	31 August 1851	364 days	Løvenskiold/Vogt
	Søren Sørenssen	Independent	15 September 1851	1 June 1853	1 year, 259 days	Løvenskiold/Vogt
	Hans Christian Petersen	Independent	1 June 1853	31 August 1853	91 days	Løvenskiold/Vogt
	Jørgen Herman Vogt	Independent	9 September 1853	1 July 1854	295 days	Løvenskiold/Vogt; Vogt
	Hans Christian Petersen	Independent	1 July 1854	31 August 1855	1 year, 61 days	Løvenskiold/Vogt
	Jørgen Herman Vogt	Independent	27 September 1855	29 September 1856	1 year, 2 days	Løvenskiold/Vogt; Vogt
	August Christian Manthey	Independent	29 September 1856	11 August 1857	316 days	Vogt
	Erik Røring Møinichen	Independent	11 August 1857	15 September 1858	1 year, 35 days	Vogt
	Hans Christian Petersen	Independent	15 September 1858	29 July 1859	317 days	Vogt; Sibbern/Birch/Motzfeldt
	August Christian Manthey	Independent	29 July 1859	1 September 1860	1 year, 34 days	Sibbern/Birch/Motzfeldt
	Christian Birch-Reichenwald	Independent	1 September 1860	12 December 1861	1 year, 102 days	Sibbern/Birch/Motzfeldt
	Erik Røring Møinichen	Independent	12 December 1861	17 December 1861	5 days	Sibbern/Birch/Motzfeldt
	Gerhard Meldahl	Independent	17 December 1861	15 October 1863	1 year, 302 days	F. Stang
	August Christian Manthey	Independent	28 September 1863	28 September 1864	1 year, 0 days	F. Stang
	Gerhard Meldahl	Independent	28 September 1864	15 October 1866	2 years, 17 days	F. Stang
	Erik Røring Møinichen	Independent	15 October 1866	15 October 1867	1 year, 0 days	F. Stang
	Gerhard Meldahl	Independent	15 October 1867	15 June 1869	1 year, 243 days	F. Stang
	August Christian Manthey	Independent	15 June 1869	1 February 1870	231 days	F. Stang
	John Collett Falsen	Independent	1 February 1870	15 July 1870	164 days	F. Stang
	Gerhard Meldahl	Independent	15 July 1870	15 October 1871	1 year, 92 days	F. Stang
	John Collett Falsen	Independent	15 October 1871	15 September 1872	336 days	F. Stang
	Gerhard Meldahl	Independent	24 September 1872	8 January 1874	1 year, 106 days	F. Stang
	Jacob Aall jr.	Independent	8 January 1874	15 May 1874	127 days	F. Stang
	Jens Holmboe	Independent	15 May 1874	15 October 1874	153 days	F. Stang
	John Collett Falsen	Independent	15 October 1874	15 August 1877	2 years, 304 days	F. Stang
	Christian A. Selmer	Independent	15 August 1877	15 August 1878	1 year, 0 days	F. Stang
	John Collett Falsen	Independent	15 August 1878	2 September 1879	1 year, 18 days	F. Stang
	Niels Vogt	Independent	2 September 1879	13 October 1879	41 days	F. Stang
	Ole Andreas Bachke	Independent	13 October 1879	15 September 1880	338 days	F. Stang
	Christian Jensen	Independent	11 October 1880	26 September 1881	350 days	Selmer
	Christian H. Schweigaard	Independent	26 September 1881	15 November 1881	50 days	Selmer
	Ole Andreas Bachke	Independent	15 November 1881	15 September 1882	304 days	Selmer
	Jens Holmboe	Independent	15 September 1882	15 September 1883	1 year, 0 days	Selmer
	Christian Jensen	Independent	15 September 1883	26 March 1884	193 days	Selmer
	Christian H. Schweigaard	Independent	26 March 1884	3 April 1884	8 days	Selmer
	Ludvig Aubert	Independent	3 April 1884	26 June 1884	84 days	Schweigaard
	Aimar Sørenssen	Liberal	26 June 1884	15 September 1887	3 years, 81 days	Sverdrup
	Birger Kildal	Liberal	15 September 1887	15 November 1887	61 days	Sverdrup
	Jacob Stang	Liberal	15 November 1887	28 June 1888	226 days	Sverdrup
	Walter Scott Dahl	Liberal	28 June 1888	1 August 1888	34 days	Sverdrup
	Jacob Stang	Liberal	1 August 1888	28 August 1888	27 days	Sverdrup
	Olaj Johan Olsen	Liberal	28 August 1888	15 September 1888	18 days	Sverdrup
	Walter Scott Dahl	Liberal	15 September 1888	13 July 1889	301 days	Sverdrup
	Ferdinand Roll	Conservative	13 July 1889	15 July 1890	1 year, 2 days	Stang I
	Ulrik Arneberg	Conservative	15 July 1890	6 March 1891	234 days	Stang I
	Ole Anton Qvam	Liberal	6 March 1891	2 May 1893	2 years, 47 days	Steen I
	Francis Hagerup	Conservative	2 May 1893	15 July 1894	1 year, 74 days	Stang II
	Ernst Motzfeldt	Conservative	15 July 1894	14 October 1895	1 year, 91 days	Stang II
	Francis Hagerup	Conservative	14 October 1895	15 August 1897	1 year, 305 days	Hagerup I
	Harald Smedal	Liberal	15 August 1897	17 February 1898	186 days	Hagerup I
	Ole Anton Qvam	Liberal	17 February 1898	28 April 1899	1 year, 70 days	Steen II
	Einar Løchen	Liberal	29 April 1899	6 November 1900	1 year, 191 days	Steen II
	Ole Anton Qvam	Liberal	6 November 1900	21 April 1902	1 year, 166 days	Steen II
	Søren Tobias Årstad	Liberal	21 April 1902	22 October 1903	1 year, 184 days	Blehr I
	Francis Hagerup	Conservative	22 October 1903	11 March 1905	1 year, 140 days	Hagerup II
	Christian Michelsen	Coalition	11 March 1905	7 June 1905	88 days	Michelsen
	Edvard H. Bull	Conservative	7 June 1905	27 November 1905	173 days	Michelsen
	Harald Bothner	Liberal	27 November 1905	23 October 1907	1 year, 330 days	Michelsen
	Johan Bredal	Independent	23 October 1907	19 March 1908	148 days	Løvland
	Johan Castberg	Liberal	19 March 1908	2 February 1910	1 year, 320 days	Knudsen I
	Herman Scheel	Conservative	2 February 1910	20 February 1912	2 years, 18 days	Konow
	Fredrik Stang	Conservative	20 February 1912	31 January 1913	346 days	Bratlie
	Lars Abrahamsen	Liberal	31 January 1913	26 July 1916	3 years, 177 days	Knudsen II
	Andreas Urbye	Liberal	26 July 1916	1 May 1917	279 days	Knudsen II
	Otto Blehr	Liberal	1 May 1917	21 June 1920	3 years, 51 days	Knudsen II
	Otto Bahr Halvorsen	Conservative	21 June 1920	22 June 1921	1 year, 1 day	B. Halvorsen I
	Olaf Amundsen	Liberal	22 June 1921	24 August 1922	1 year, 63 days	Blehr II
	Arnold Holmboe	Liberal	24 August 1922	6 March 1923	194 days	Blehr II
	Otto Bahr Halvorsen	Conservative	6 March 1923	23 May 1923	78 days	B. Halvorsen II
	Christian L. Rolfsen	Conservative	30 May 1923	25 July 1924	1 year, 56 days	Berge
	Paal Berg	Liberal	25 July 1924	5 March 1926	1 year, 223 days	Mowinckel I
	Ingolf E. Christensen	Conservative	5 March 1926	26 July 1926	143 days	Lykke
	Knud Øyen	Conservative	26 July 1926	28 January 1928	1 year, 186 days	Lykke
	Cornelius Holmboe	Labour	28 January 1928	15 February 1928	18 days	Hornsrud
	Haakon M. Evjenth	Liberal	15 February 1928	21 November 1930	2 years, 279 days	Mowinckel II
	Arne T. Sunde	Liberal	21 November 1930	12 May 1931	172 days	Mowinckel II
	Asbjørn Lindboe	Agrarian	12 May 1931	3 March 1933	1 year, 295 days	Kolstad; Hundseid
	Arne T. Sunde	Liberal	3 March 1933	20 March 1935	2 years, 17 days	Mowinckel III
	Trygve Lie	Labour	20 March 1935	1 July 1939	4 years, 103 days	Nygaardsvold
	Terje Wold	Labour	1 July 1939	25 June 1945	5 years, 359 days	Nygaardsvold

=== During the German occupation of Norway (1940–1945) ===
Photo	Name	Party	Took office	Left office	Tenure	Cabinet
	Jonas Lie	National Unification	9 April 1940	15 April 1940	6 days	Quisling I
	Ole Fingalf Harbek	Independent	15 April 1940	25 September 1940	163 days	Administrative Council
	Sverre Riisnæs	National Unification	25 September 1940	8 May 1945	4 years, 225 days	Quisling II

=== Ministry of Justice and the Police (1945–2012) ===
Photo	Name	Party	Took office	Left office	Tenure	Cabinet
	Johan Cappelen	Conservative	25 June 1945	5 November 1945	133 days	Gerhardsen I
	O. C. Gundersen	Labour	5 November 1945	20 December 1952	7 years, 45 days	Gerhardsen II; Torp
	Kai Birger Knudsen	Labour	20 December 1952	15 June 1954	1 year, 177 days	Torp
	Gustav Sjaastad	Labour	15 June 1954	22 January 1955	221 days	Torp
	Jens Chr. Hauge	Labour	22 January 1955	1 November 1955	283 days	Gerhardsen III
	Jens Haugland	Labour	1 November 1955	28 August 1963	7 years, 300 days	Gerhardsen III
	Petter Mørch Koren	Christian Democratic	28 August 1963	25 September 1963	28 days	Lyng
	O. C. Gundersen	Labour	25 September 1963	12 October 1965	2 years, 17 days	Gerhardsen IV
	Elisabeth S. Selmer	Conservative	12 October 1965	3 October 1970	4 years, 356 days	Borten
	Egil Endresen	Conservative	3 October 1970	17 March 1971	165 days	Borten
	Oddvar Berrefjord	Labour	17 March 1971	18 October 1972	1 year, 215 days	Bratteli I
	Petter Mørch Koren	Christian Democratic	18 October 1972	16 October 1973	363 days	Korvald
	Inger Louise Valle	Labour	16 October 1973	8 October 1979	5 years, 357 days	Bratteli II; Nordli
	Andreas Cappelen	Labour	8 October 1979	3 October 1980	361 days	Nordli
	Oddvar Berrefjord	Labour	3 October 1980	4 February 1981	124 days	Nordli
	Bjørn Skau	Labour	4 February 1981	14 October 1981	252 days	Brundtland I
	Mona Røkke	Conservative	14 October 1981	4 October 1985	3 years, 355 days	Willoch I-II
	Wenche F. Sellæg	Conservative	4 October 1985	9 May 1986	217 days	Willoch II
	Helen M. Bøsterud	Labour	9 May 1986	16 October 1989	3 years, 160 days	Brundtland II
	Else B. Fougner	Conservative	16 October 1989	3 November 1990	1 year, 18 days	Syse
	Kari Gjesteby	Labour	3 November 1990	4 September 1992	1 year, 306 days	Brundtland III
	Grete Faremo	Labour	4 September 1992	25 October 1996	4 years, 51 days	Brundtland III
	Anne Holt	Labour	25 October 1996	4 February 1997	102 days	Jagland
	Gerd-Liv Valla	Labour	4 February 1997	17 October 1997	255 days	Jagland
	Aud Inger Aure	Christian Democratic	17 October 1997	15 March 1999	1 year, 149 days	Bondevik I
	Odd Einar Dørum	Liberal	15 March 1999	17 March 2000	1 year, 2 days	Bondevik I
	Hanne Harlem	Labour	17 March 2000	19 October 2001	1 year, 216 days	Stoltenberg I
	Odd Einar Dørum	Liberal	19 October 2001	17 October 2005	3 years, 363 days	Bondevik II
	Knut Storberget	Labour	17 October 2005	11 November 2011	6 years, 25 days	Stoltenberg II
	Grete Faremo	Labour	11 November 2011	16 October 2013	1 year, 339 days	Stoltenberg II

=== Ministry of Justice and Public Security (2012–) ===
Photo	Name	Party	Took office	Left office	Tenure	Cabinet
	Grete Faremo	Labour	11 November 2011	16 October 2013	1 year, 339 days	Stoltenberg II
	Anders Anundsen	Progress	16 October 2013	20 December 2016	3 years, 65 days	Solberg
	Per-Willy Amundsen	Progress	20 December 2016	17 January 2018	1 year, 28 days	Solberg
	Sylvi Listhaug	Progress	17 January 2018	20 March 2018	62 days	Solberg
	Tor Mikkel Wara	Progress	4 April 2018	15 March 2019	345 days	Solberg
	Jøran Kallmyr	Progress	29 March 2019	24 January 2020	301 days	Solberg
	Monica Mæland	Conservative	24 January 2020	14 October 2021	1 year, 263 days	Solberg
	Emilie Enger Mehl	Centre	14 October 2021	4 February 2025	3 years, 113 days	Støre
	Astri Aas-Hansen	Labour	4 February 2025	present	1 year, 246 days	Støre

== Minister of Immigration and Integration ==
The Minister of Immigration and Integration was a minister-post that was responsible for dealing with immigration and integration related cases. The post was established in 2015 in response to the 2015 European migrant crisis, and was abolished in 2018. Sylvi Listhaug was the first and only person to hold the post, and was promoted to Minister of Justice when the position was abolished in 2018.

Key
Progress Party

=== Minister ===
Photo	Name	Party	Took office	Left office	Tenure	Cabinet	Ref
	Sylvi Listhaug	Progress	16 December 2015	17 January 2018	2 years, 32 days	Solberg	

== Minister of Public Security ==
The Minister of Public Security was a post established in 2019 after the Christian Democrats joined the Solberg Cabinet. The post was primarily responsible for issues related to public security.

Key
Progress Party

=== Minister ===
Photo	Name	Party	Took office	Left office	Tenure	Cabinet	Ref
	Ingvil Smines Tybring-Gjedde	Progress	22 January 2019	24 January 2020	1 year, 2 days	Solberg	

== See also ==
- Courts of justice of Norway
- Governor of Svalbard
- Justice ministry
- National Police Directorate
- Norwegian Correctional Services
- Norwegian Ministry of Justice and the Police
- Norwegian Police Security Agency
- Politics of Norway
