= Lars Knutson Liestøl =

Norwegian politician

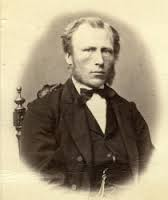
Lars Knutson Liestøl

Lars Knutson Liestøl (13 June 1839 – 15 December 1912) was a Norwegian politician.

He was born to Knut Larsson Liestøl and Gyro Grundesdotter Liestøl and married Vilhelmine Josefine Thomasdtr Liestøl. Liestøl served on the municipal council of Bygland Municipality in Nedenes, Norway over a 36-year period. He also was the mayor of Bygland Municipality for twelve years. He was a member of the Norwegian Parliament during various sessions between the periods 1874–1912. He served in the government of Prime Minister Johan Sverdrup as Minister of Auditing from 1888–1889, as well as head of the Ministry of the Interior in 1888.
