= Johan Collett Falsen =

Norwegian jurist and politician

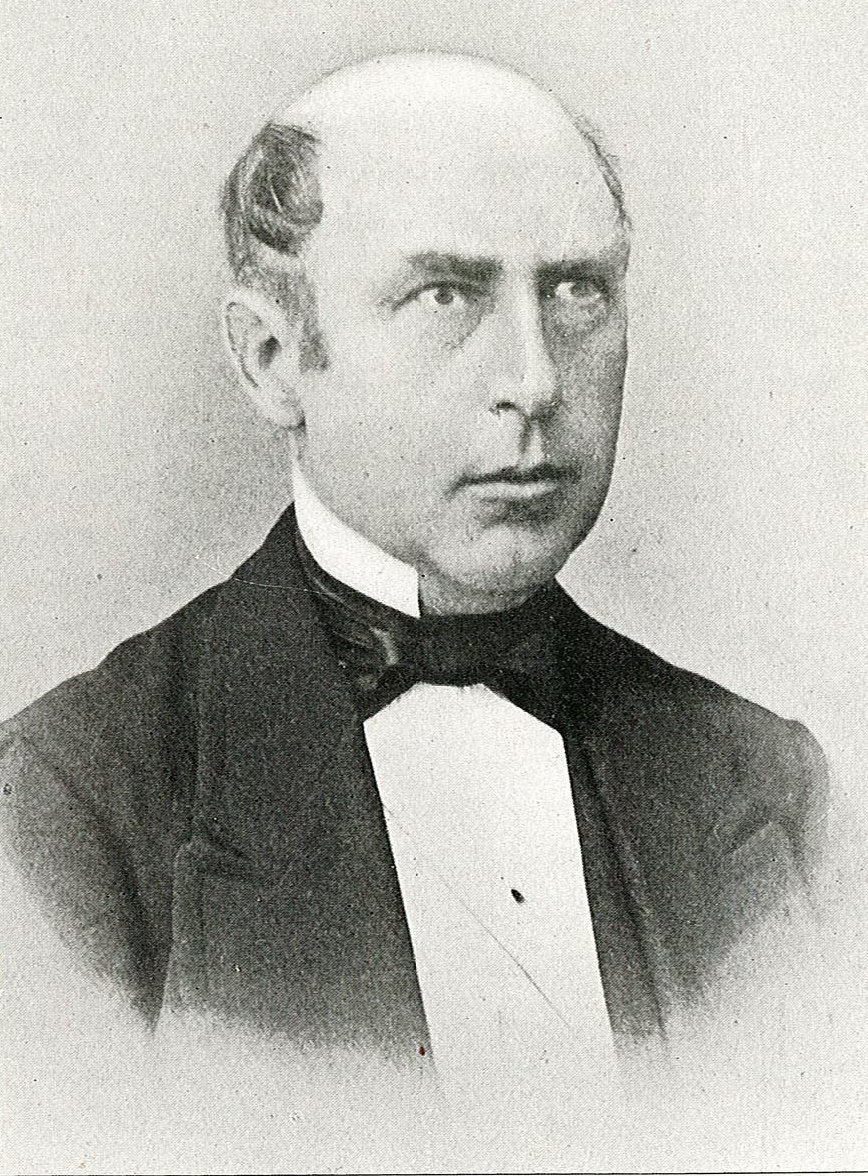
Johan Collett Falsen

Johan Collett Falsen (9 September 1817 – 2 September 1879) was a Norwegian jurist and politician.

John Collett Falsen born in the town of Grimstad in Nedenes amt in southern Norway. He was the son of Hagbart Falsen and wife Aletta Fleischer. He was the grandson of Enevold de Falsen (1755–1808) as well as being the nephew of admiral Jørgen Conrad de Falsen (1785–1849), statesman Christian Magnus Falsen (1782–1830) and county governor Carl Valentin de Falsen (1787–1852).

Falsen attended Bergen Cathedral School (1828). He graduated as cand.jur. from the University of Christiania in 1841. He worked as an attorney (prokurator) in Nedenes from 1846, and then in Trondhjem. In 1849 he moved to Drammen to work as an attorney there. He became involved in politics, serving as mayor of Drammen Municipality from 1853 to 1859 and in 1861. He was first elected to the Norwegian Parliament in 1859, representing the urban constituency of Drammen.

In 1861 he was appointed County Governors of Nordre Bergenhus amt (now part of Vestland county). He first resided at Lærdalsøyri, but bought a farm in Leikanger Municipality in 1862. He thus became the first County Governor to live in Leikanger, where the county administration is located today. While stationed here, he was elected to Parliament for two more terms; in 1865 and 1868. He left the County Governor position in 1869 to pursue a career in national politics.

In February 1870 Falsen was appointed Minister of Justice and the Police. His tenure ended on 29 June the same year; two days later he was appointed to the Council of State Division in Stockholm. On 1 August 1871 he was reassigned again, this time as Minister of the Navy and Postal Affairs. Only two months later, on 1 October, he was appointed Minister of Justice again.

He held this post until 1 September 1872, when he was appointed Minister of the Interior. He held this position for exactly one year; then he returned to the Council of State Division in Stockholm. Exactly one year after that, he was appointed to his third period as Minister of Justice. He held this post until his death in September 1879, except for a period between 1 August 1877 and 1 August 1878, when he was assigned to the Council of State Division in Stockholm.

Falsen was appointed a Commander of the Order of St. Olav, a Grand Cross of the Swedish Order of the Polar Star and a Grand Cross of the Danish Order of the Dannebrog.

Political offices
Preceded by Michael Aubert	County Governor of Nordre Bergenhus amt 1861–1869	Succeeded by Nicolai Ræder
Preceded by Ole Jacob Broch	Norwegian Minister of the Navy and Postal Affairs; August 1871–October 1871	Succeeded by August Christian Manthey
Preceded by Niels Petersen Vogt	Norwegian Minister of the Interior; 1872–1873	Succeeded by Niels Petersen Vogt
Legal offices
Preceded by August Christian Manthey	Norwegian Minister of Justice and the Police; February 1870–June 1870	Succeeded by Hans Meldahl
Preceded by Hans Meldahl	Norwegian Minister of Justice and the Police; October 1871–1872	Succeeded by Hans Meldahl
Preceded by Jens Holmboe	Norwegian Minister of Justice and the Police; 1874–1877	Succeeded by Christian August Selmer
Preceded by Christian August Selmer	Norwegian Minister of Justice and the Police; 1878–1879	Succeeded by Niels Petersen Vogt
