= Christian Jensen (politician) =

Norwegian politician

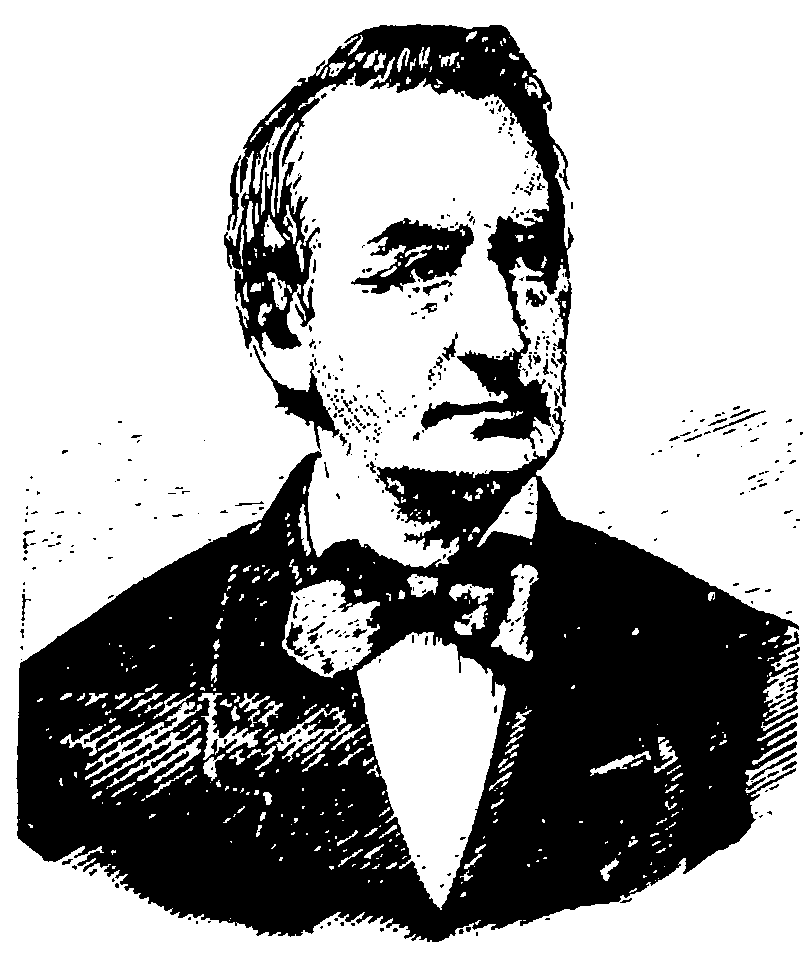
Christian Jensen.

Christian Jensen (14 April 1823 - 3 September 1884) was a Norwegian politician.

He served as County Governor of Kristians Amt (Oppland) from 1859 to 1869. While stationed here, he was elected to the Norwegian Parliament in 1862, 1865 and 1868. After a hiatus he was a deputy representative during the term 1874–1877, and re-elected for a final term in 1877. He was then burgomaster in Kristiania.

He was then brought in as a part of the executive branch of government. He was appointed Minister of Auditing on 13 October 1879. On 1 December 1880 he was also appointed Minister of Justice and the Police. On 21 December he left as Minister of Auditing. He was then a member of the Council of State Division in Stockholm from September 1881 to 31 August 1882. The day after that he was appointed Minister of the Interior. Exactly one year after that he left this position to become Minister of Justice and the Police for a second time. He finally left government on 25 March 1884.

Political offices
Preceded by Johan Christian Collett	County Governor of Oppland; 1859–1869	Succeeded by Hans Thomas Meinich
Preceded by Christian Selmer	Norwegian Minister of Auditing; 1879–1880	Succeeded by Christian Homann Schweigaard
Preceded by Ole Bachke	Norwegian Minister of Justice and the Police; 1880–1881	Succeeded by Frederik Christian Stoud Platou (acting)
Preceded by Niels Petersen Vogt	Minister of the Interior; 1882–1883	Succeeded by Niels Petersen Vogt
Preceded by Ole Bachke	Norwegian Minister of Justice and the Police; 1883–1884	Succeeded by Christian Homann Schweigaard
