= Otto Richard Kierulf =

Norwegian military officer, politician and sports administrator

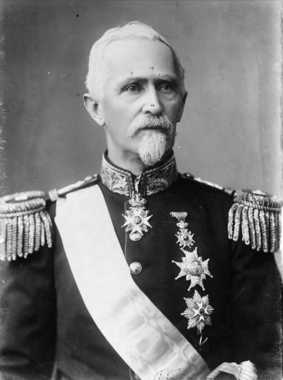

Norwegian Prime Minister in Stockholm
- In office 1 November 1871 – 21 March 1884
- Monarchs: Charles IV; Oscar II
- Prime Minister: Frederik Stang; Christian A. Selmer
- Preceded by: Georg Sibbern
- Succeeded by: Carl Otto Løvenskiold

Personal details
- Born: 29 January 1825 Christiania, Norway
- Died: 7 January 1897 (aged 71) Kristiania, Norway
- Occupation: military officer, politician and sports administrator

Otto Richard Kierulf (29 January 1825 – 7 January 1897) was a Norwegian military officer, politician and sports administrator.

== Biography ==
Otto Richard Kierulf was born in Christiania (now Oslo). Kierulf was the son of Lieutenant Colonel Christian Kierulf and Anne Marie Sofie Winge. He was born into a military family. He took his officer training in the infantry and was promoted to second lieutenant in 1842. In 1847, he entered the artillery and advanced in 1860 to lieutenant colonel.

He was the first leader of Norwegian Olympic and Paralympic Committee and Confederation of Sports (Centralforeningen for Udbredelse af Legemsøvelser og Vaabenbrug), first from 1861 to 1864, and again from 1867 to 1869.

He served as a member of Christiania City Council, and was deputy to Parliament for Christiania during the period 1871–1873. He served as Norwegian prime minister in Stockholm (1873–1884) and served as the Norwegian prime minister of the interim government (1875–1881).

In 1859 he was appointed knight in the Order of Saint Olav and promoted to Grand Cross in 1873. He was the knight of the Royal Order of the Seraphim, the Order of Vasa, the Order of Charles XIII, and of the Order of the Danneborg. He died during 1897 in Oslo and was buried at Vestre gravlund.
