= Johan Christian =

Johan Christian may refer to:

- Johan Christian Collett (1817–1895), Norwegian politician
- Johan Christian Dahl (1788–1857), Norwegian landscape painter
- Johan Christian Fabricius (1745–1808), Danish entomologist and economist
