= Andreas Arntzen =

Norwegian politician (1777–1837)

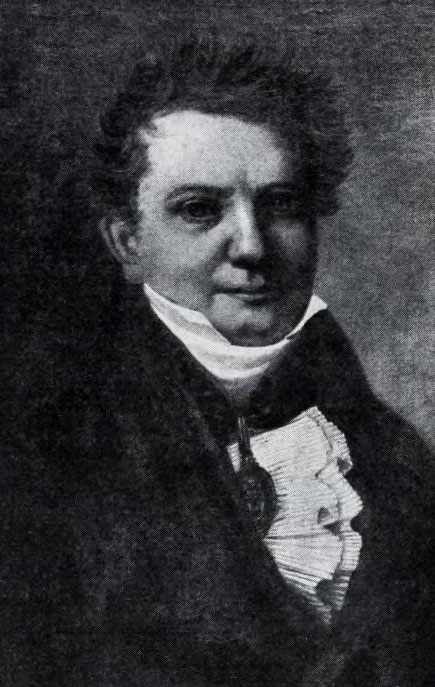
Andreas Arntzen

Andreas Arntzen (18 February 1777 – 14 December 1837) was a Norwegian politician.

He was born in Grue, and graduated as cand.jur. in Copenhagen in 1802. He then worked as an attorney, chief of police of Christiania, Supreme Court judge and even a timber merchant.

He was elected to the Norwegian Parliament in 1814, 1818 and 1821, representing the constituency of Christiania. During the 1821 term he was President of the Storting, together with Ingelbrecht Knudssøn, Carsten Tank, Christian M. Falsen and Valentin Sibbern.

On 1 December 1836 Arntzen was appointed Minister of Church Affairs and Education. He left on 1 June 1837, but returned a month later to become Minister of Justice and the Police. He died before the end of the year.

Andreas Arntzen was the father of jurist Carl Arntzen (1801–1877) and County Governor Karelius August Arntzen (1802–1875).

Political offices
Preceded by Valentin C. W. Sibbern; Wilhelm F. K. Christie; Georg Sverdrup	President of the Storting; 1821	Succeeded by Carl Valentin Falsen; Valentin C. W. Sibbern
Preceded by Oluf Borch de Schouboe	Minister of Church Affairs and Education; 1836–1837	Succeeded by Poul Christian Holst
Preceded by Valentin C. W. Sibbern	Minister of Justice and the Police; July 1837–December 1837	Succeeded by Poul Christian Holst
