= Johan Sverdrup =

4th Prime Minister of Norway

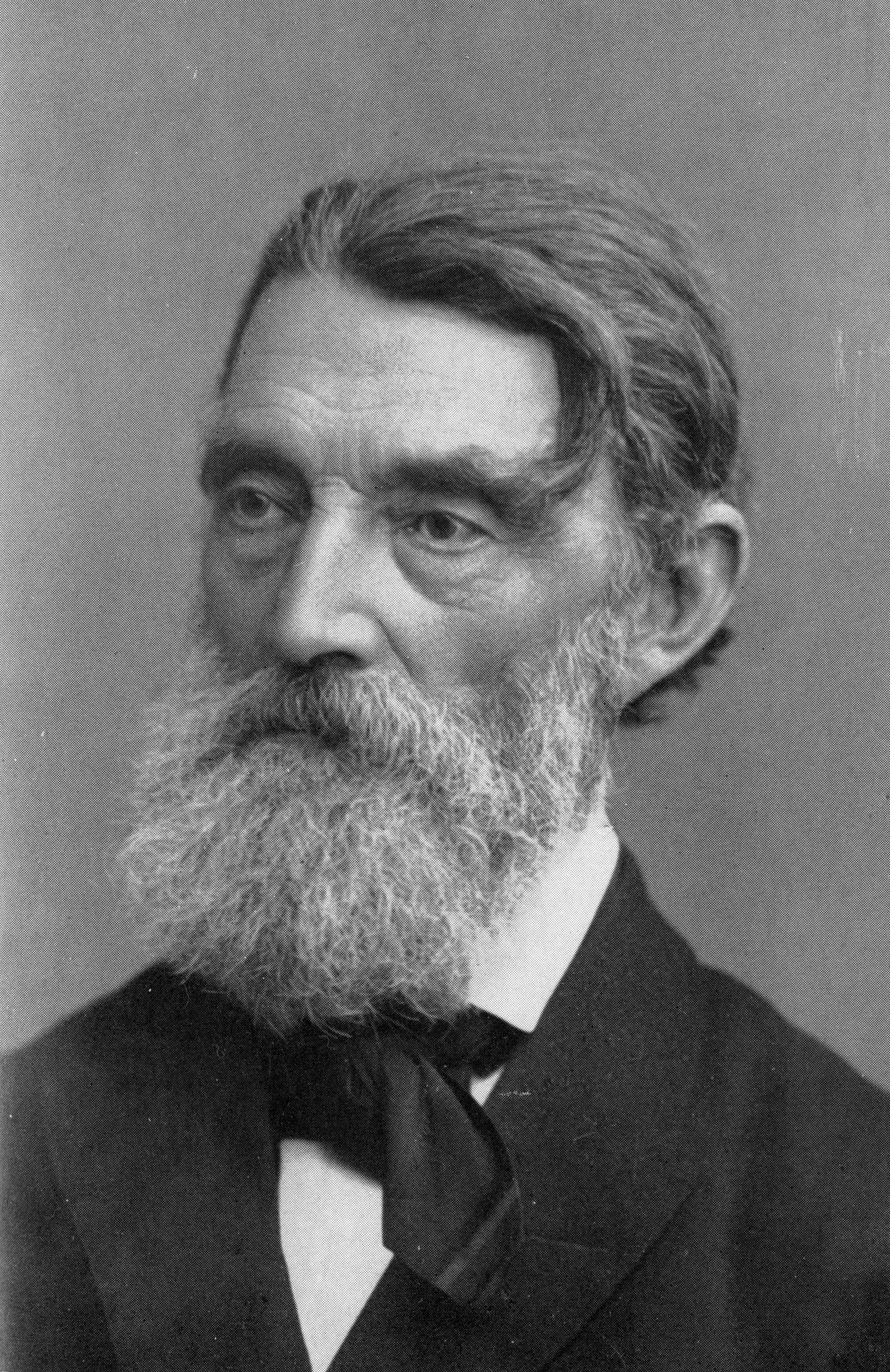
- Johan Sverdrup

Prime Minister of Norway
- In office 26 June 1884 – 13 July 1889
- Monarch: Oscar II
- Preceded by: Christian Schweigaard
- Succeeded by: Emil Stang

Leader of the Liberal Party
- In office 1884–1884
- Preceded by: Office established
- Succeeded by: Ole Anton Qvam

Minister of Defence
- In office 1 September 1885 – 13 July 1889
- Prime Minister: Himself
- Preceded by: Position established
- Succeeded by: Edvard Hans Hoff

Minister of Auditing
- In office 26 June 1884 – 16 July 1884
- Prime Minister: Himself
- Preceded by: Christian Schweigaard
- Succeeded by: Birger Kildal

Minister of the Navy and Postal Affairs
- In office 26 June 1884 – 1 September 1885
- Prime Minister: Himself
- Preceded by: Bøicke Koren
- Succeeded by: Position abolished

Member of the Norwegian Parliament
- In office 1 January 1851 – 31 December 1884
- Constituency: Vestfold

Personal details
- Born: Johan Sverdrup; 30 July 1816 Sem, Vestfold, United Kingdoms of Sweden and Norway
- Died: 17 February 1892 (aged 75) Christiania, United Kingdoms of Sweden and Norway
- Party: Liberal
- Spouse: Caroline Sverdrup
- Occupation: Politician
- Profession: Lawyer

Johan Sverdrup (30 July 1816 – 17 February 1892) was a Norwegian politician from the Liberal Party. He was the first prime minister of Norway after the introduction of parliamentarism. Sverdrup was prime minister from 1884 to 1889.

== Early years ==
He was born at Sem in Vestfold, Norway, to Jacob Liv Borch Sverdrup (1775–1841) and Gundelle Birgitte Siang (1780–1820). His father was a pioneer in scientific agriculture in Norway. He finished his law studies in 1841. He worked as a lawyer in Larvik, a small town on the west coast of the Oslofjord. In 1851, he was for the first time elected to the Storting, and from then until his appointment as prime minister in 1884, he was one of the leaders of parliament. In Norway, political parties were considered inappropriate and unwanted. Sverdrup tried from his earliest days in the Storting to form a radical party consisting of the large group of peasants and the radical elements among the representatives from the cities. His first attempt was named the "lawyers' party" after the profession of the leaders of the group. It soon became evident that the times were not ripe for such a radical novelty, and for the next years Sverdrup knit a loose alliance with the peasant leader Ole Gabriel Ueland (1799–1870).

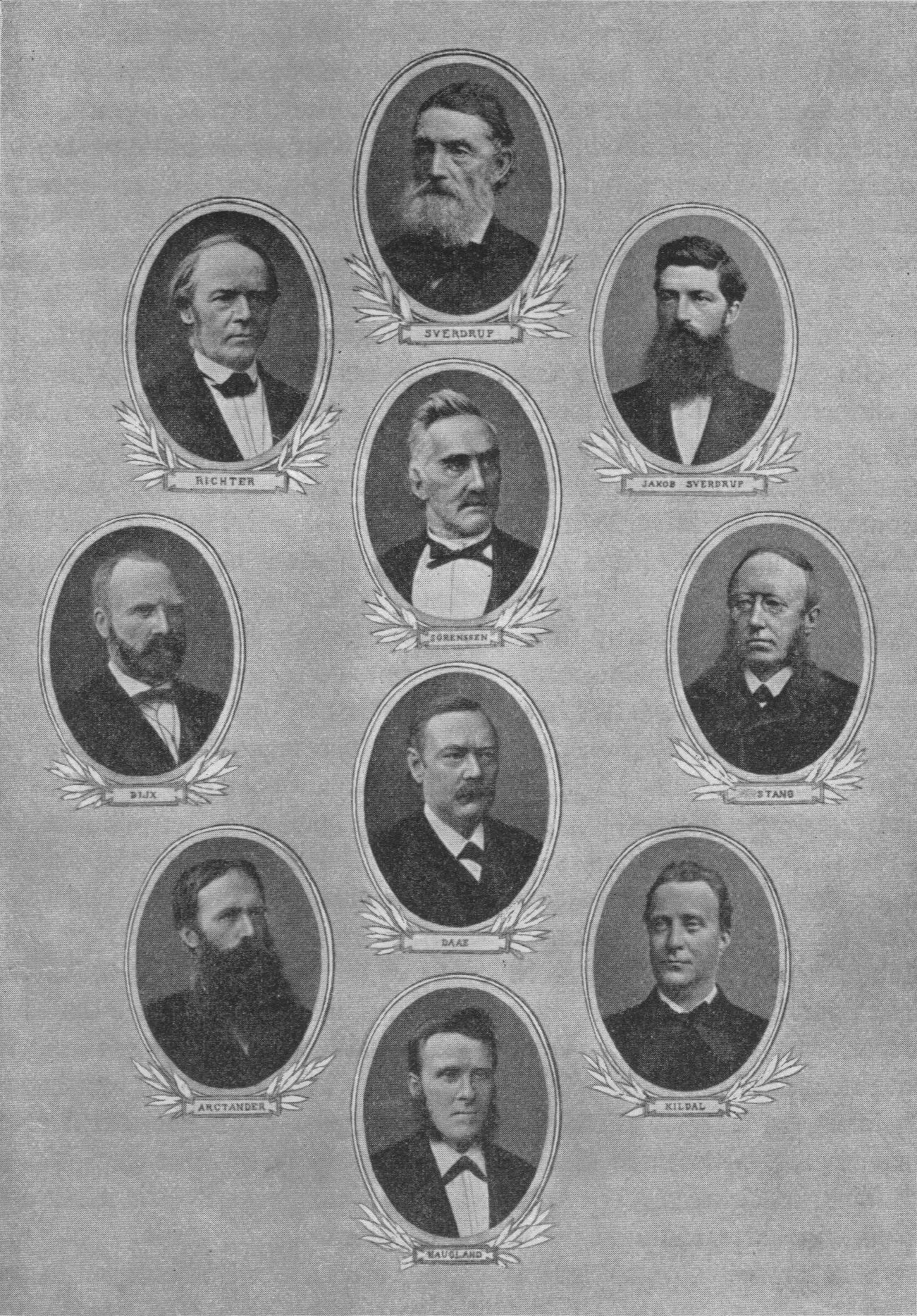
Sverdrup's ministry

== Forming the alliance ==
In 1870, Ueland died, and the loose leadership of the alliance of peasants went over to Søren Jaabæk (1814–1894), an economically extremely conservative politician, whose views hardly exceeded the most primitive cutting of every part of the budget, even if the money in question would be used to the furthering of democracy and education, two of his most important topics. Such negative policy-making (Jaabæk's name was changed by the ministerial adherents and press to Neibæk after the Norwegian word nei 'no' contrasting with ja 'yes') would never produce great results, which Sverdrup clearly foresaw. He did not hesitate to acknowledge Jaabæk as the formal leader and organizer of this budding party, based on the Bondevenforeninger (peasant friend associations) that Jaabæk managed to spread throughout most of the country. However, in parliament Jaabæk often bowed to Sverdrup's more advanced political strategies, when they were not too expensive.

In 1869, a political reform of the greatest importance was introduced, yearly parliamentary sessions instead of the earlier triannual sessions. This definitely tipped the scale of political influence in favor of the Storting, and it is not easy to see the reasons for the King's acceptance of this reform. The major reason was probably the growing necessity to get updated budgets, which was naturally the Storting's task to provide.

During the 1860s, the views towards the ministers' participation in the parliamentary sessions had changed totally. The ministerials, as they were called, were now unanimously against, because they had seen the formation of the peasants' friends as a threat to what they deemed to be the ideal, the totally independent representative. The peasants and the radicals on the other hand, had drawn the obviously correct conclusion that this reform would further the influence of the elected towards the appointed ministers.

In 1870, the Storting passed a change in the constitution which granted the ministers admission to Parliament when asked, but the King refused to sanction the law, stating that it was premature so few years after the yearly sessions reform. In 1872 the new king, Oscar II, decided that Norway, in its precarious situation with the Council mostly convening in the capital, Christiania (now Oslo), while the king mostly lived in Sweden's capital Stockholm needed two prime ministers, one in each capital. Until then there had only been one in Stockholm, because the Council in Christiania was supposed to be led by an appointed governor, a position which had been vacant for 15 years because no Swedish king had dared or wished to appoint a new governor.

This made an extremely minor change in the suggested change in the constitution, when it was passed in 1873, necessary, namely that there were now two prime ministers, while there was only one in the previous law text. The changed constitution was not sanctioned this time either. The same happened in 1876 and 1879, and now a major problem had occurred, which made Norwegian politics extremely difficult for several years. The Constitution explicitly stated that the king had a veto three times in law and budget matters, but there was no mention of any kind of veto concerning constitutional matters.

This omission gave way to three possibilities:

1. The king had no veto at all
2. The king had an absolute veto
3. The king had the same veto rights as in all other matters

The opposition which made up a vast majority, had practically rejected the first possibility and decided upon the third, whereas the Council and the minority of the Storting was certain of the king's absolute veto.

== Strife hardens ==
The strife which had started as a practical political reform had now turned into a political debacle which would have to change the checks and balances between the legislative and the executive branch. This had definitely become Sverdrup's goal. "All power must be gathered in the halls of the Storting" became his political program. In 1879 his party in the making made a coup by promulgating the new change in the constitution. This took the Council by surprise that the grand old man of the Council, Prime Minister Frederik Stang, resigned. The new prime minister, Christian Selmer, was not such a leader and force in the Council, and Sverdrup was ready for the next move, which should constitutionally have been taken in 1881. But Sverdrup's majority was not great enough to be certain of a victory in the forthcoming impeachment of the Council.

In the 1882 general elections Sverdrup's party won a convincing majority. They were able to fill the 25% of the Storting who were, together with the Supreme Court, the judges of the court, with only members of the leftist party in formation. Venstre (from the Norwegian word for left) was Sverdrup's and Jaabæk's liberal and radical party but definitely a party with no socialist affiliations. Høyre (from the Norwegian word for 'right') was the Council's and the minority party which was considered to be conservative.

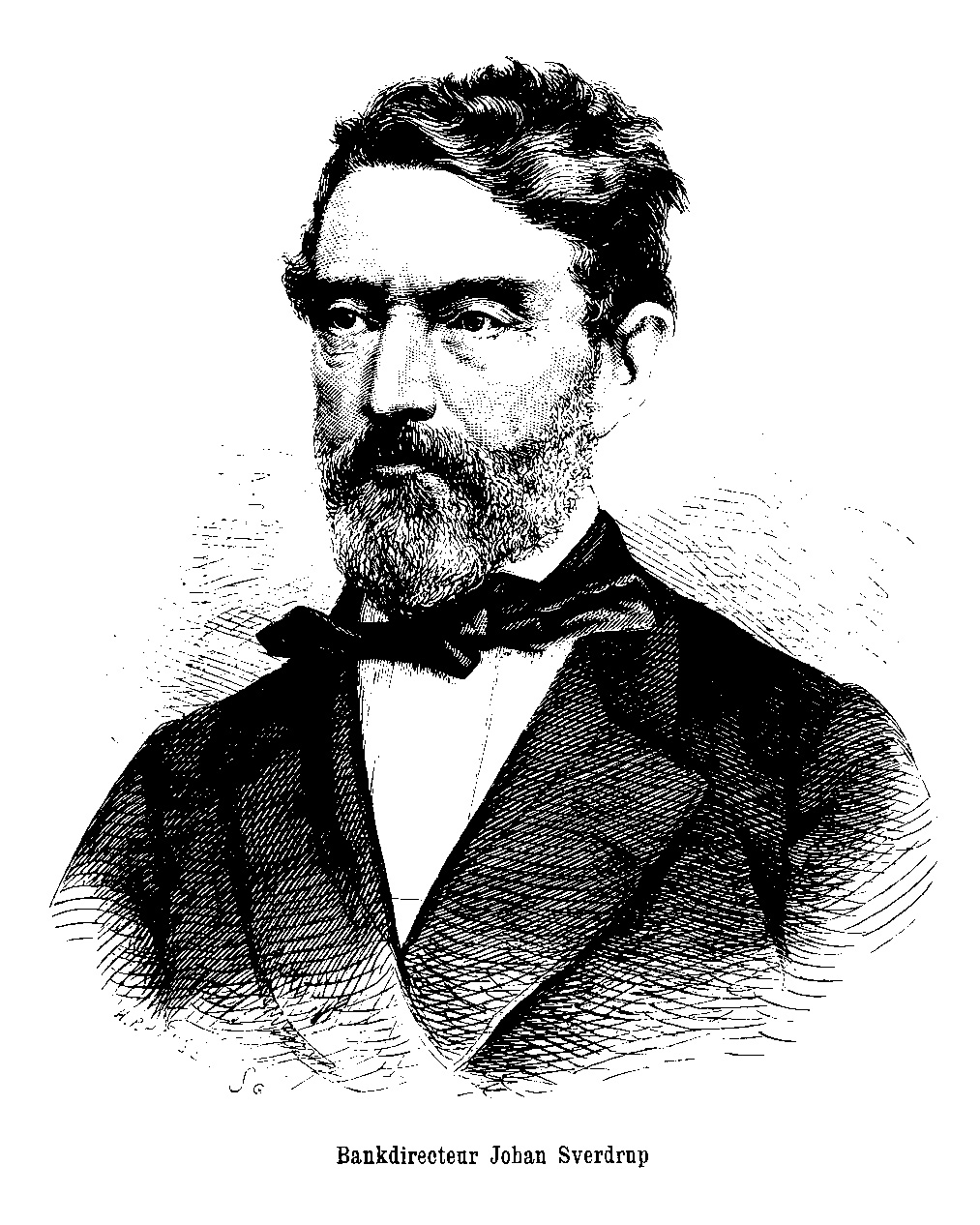
Engraving by H. P. Hansen

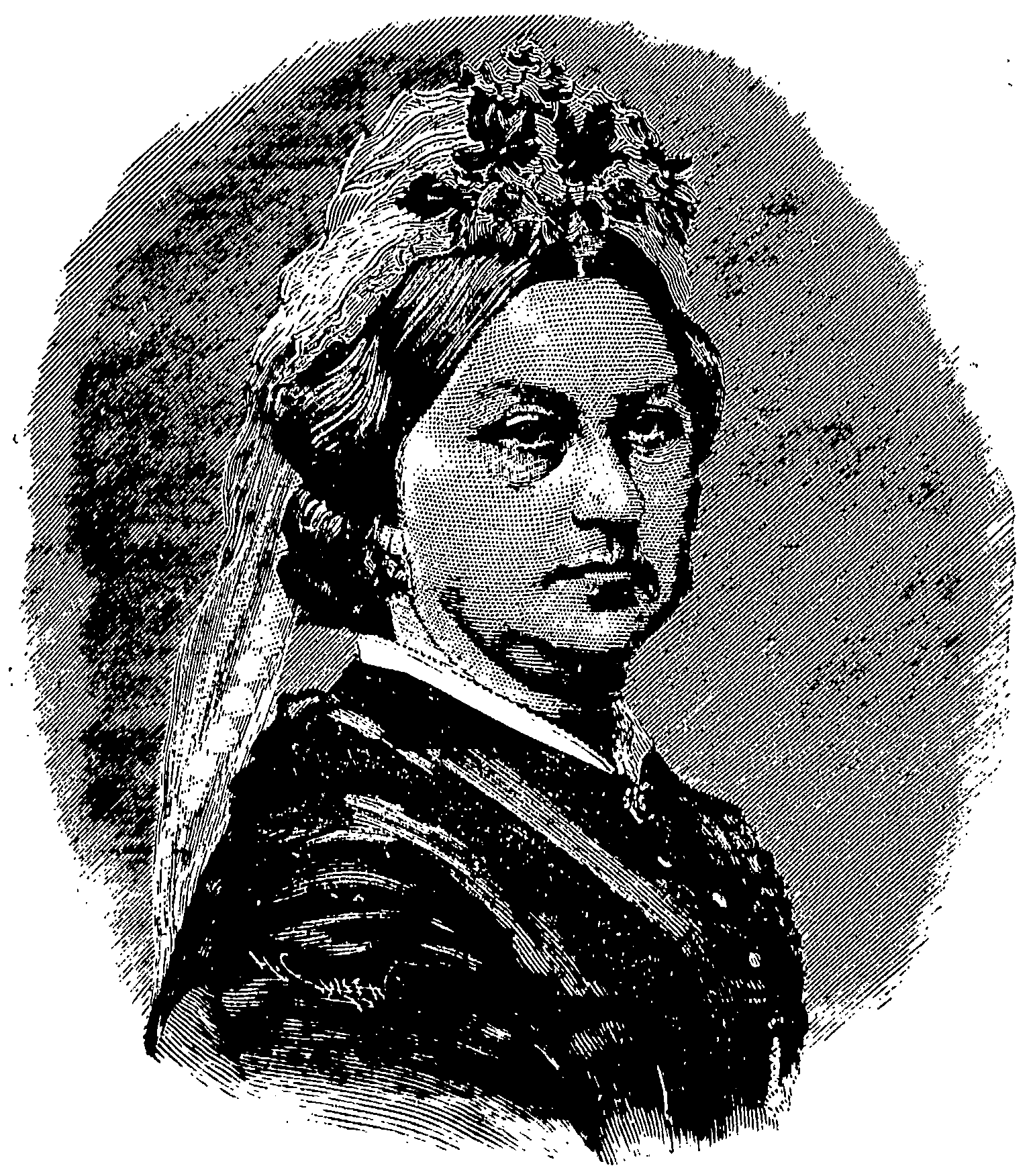
Sverdrup's wife, Caroline

In the fall 1883, the judges convened and the trials took several months and resulted in loss of position without honor for most of the ministers and huge fines. The king appointed a new Council led by Christian Schweigaard, but was a rather lame move, since Sverdrup immediately threatened with a new impeachment trial. The new Council was named the April Ministry, which says something about how long the king's struggle to find a solution to the total crisis that had occurred, which he could deem acceptable.

It turned out there was no other choice than to appoint Johan Sverdrup as prime minister. In Norwegian tradition the transition from Montesquieu's ideal of checks and balances to a parliamentary system took place when he became the prime minister. There is evidence that Sverdrup himself never really understood the consequences of a parliamentary system. Hence his five years in power with a vast majority in support, was no triumph march, but a row of defeats in Parliament. It is not far from a personal tragedy, and his resignation in 1889 was the only possible finale to a rather unworthy drama that took place within the Venstre.

== Sverdrup's government ==
It turned out from the first day that Sverdrup as a prime minister was not the competent strategist that most Norwegians had either learned to fear or admire. He expected his adherents to follow him as they had done for almost 30 years. It also turns out that Venstre was a more loosely knit coalition than Sverdrup and the other leaders had expected. The fight against the powerful executive branch had created alliances that broke very quickly afterwards. Sverdrup and all his ministers belonged to the conservative faction of the party. They had strong support what the leading Norwegian sociologist, Stein Rokkan, labeled the periphery, adherents of lay Christianity in opposition to the clergy, adherents of the so-called New Norwegian in opposition to the Norwegian spoken in the cities, adherents of totalitarianism.

His great mistake was to refuse to include anyone from the radical faction and to further alienate them by not accepting their advice in any of the difficult political situations that arose in those years. In the 1885 general election the party's slogan was "Have confidence in Johan Sverdrup" which later has been deemed one of the most ridiculous slogans ever created. A party without ability to find anything to unite about will have no long life, and the breach in the party became evident throughout the three years before the next general elections.

Sverdrup and his colleagues and diminishing group in the Storting were more or less expelled from the party and had to start their own Venstre. The original party, now led by Sverdrup's leading opponents, Ullmann and Steen, voted against him and mocked the elder statesman for clinging to the "Chair", but he was saved by Høyre which had no intentions to diminish the strife within the Venstre, and believed that their best hope was to leave the Sverdrup ministry in peace until the general elections in 1888. After those elections, which proved fully that Høyre strategy had been a sound one, Sverdrup's ministry was quickly ousted.

== Father of Parliamentarism ==
The views towards this controversial political leader will differ greatly with the political and historical affiliation of those expressing a view. It can not be denied that Sverdrup was an extremely skilled and able opposition leader and strategist whose influence of domestic politics was enormous for about 30 years. What can be said against such a viewpoint, is that most of the results of his opposition was destructive because he sold his radical and social liberal political views in order to gain influence in Jaabæk's loosely knit alliance of peasants. On the other hand one tends to forget that there was a class struggle between the peasants and the public servant and tradesmen classes, which in Norway with no nobility, were the most influential, and that Sverdrup, a public servant, joined the vast and less influential group of peasants in order to transform the society.

His weakness was his inability to bury hatchets and his apparent lack of flexibility in older age. His inability to understand the concept of parliamentarism, which seemed to be the ultimate goal of his policies. His clinging to the symbols of power can be ascribed to his age, but he was only about 70. Most historians would conclude that his fight against the king's appointed Council lasted too long. He was too old to harvest the fruits, but he paved the way for a new political situation in Norway.

== Other sources ==
- "Johan Sverdrup – "parlamentarismens far"". stortinget.no (in Norwegian). January 10, 2009.
- "Johan Sverdrup". regjeringen.no.

Political offices
Preceded by Christian Homann Schweigaard	Prime Minister of Norway; 1884–1889	Succeeded by Emil Stang
