= List of heads of government of Norway =

This is a list of heads of government of Norway. In the modern era, the head of government has the title prime minister (Norwegian: Statsminister). At various times in the past, the highest governmental title has included steward (Norwegian: Rigsstatholder), viceroy (Norwegian: Vicekonge) and first minister (Norwegian: Førstestatsraad)

Until 1873, the king of the personal union between Sweden and Norway governed Norway through two cabinets: one in Stockholm and another in Christiania (now Oslo). The newly created Stockholm cabinet consisted of a prime minister and two ministers, whose role was to convey the attitudes of the Christiania cabinet to the Swedish king. The cabinet in Christiania was led by a steward (Norwegian: Rigsstatholder). For brief periods, the incumbent crown prince was appointed Viceroy of Norway by the king, in which case the viceroy became the highest authority in Christiania. Whenever the king was present in Christiania, however, he assumed the highest authority, thus putting the governor or viceroy temporarily out of charge. Likewise, when there was no governor, viceroy, or king present in Christiania (which was not unusual), the cabinet was led by the first minister, who was the most prominent member of the cabinet.

In July 1873, the position of governor was abolished after being vacant since 1856. Simultaneously, the post of First Minister in Christiania was upgraded to Prime Minister of Norway. Although the office of Norwegian prime minister in Stockholm still existed, the real power and influence over state affairs was moved to the prime minister in Christiania, while prime minister in Stockholm became the second highest cabinet position, responsible for conveying the government's views to the king. When the union was dissolved in 1905, the position of prime minister in Stockholm was abolished.

== Stewards of Norway ==
The Steward of Norway, styled Rigsstatholder in Danish (riksstattholder in modern Norwegian spelling), meaning Royal steward of the realm (see Steward), was the appointed head of the Norwegian Government in the absence of the monarch during the Dano-Norwegian union. As Norway was a separate kingdom, with its own laws and institutions, the position of Steward of Norway was arguably the most influential position for a Danish-Norwegian nobleman or royal to hold, second to the king.

== Split premiership (1814–1905) ==
=== First Minister (1814–1873) ===
Prior to 1884, there were no organised political parties in Norway; the prime ministers were considered senior civil servants (Embedsmenn). They were appointed by the King and were not subject to legislative confirmation. All Prime Ministers before 1884 opposed the constitutional reforms proposed by the parliamentary opposition, and were in their time viewed as conservatives. The Prime Minister was subordinate to the Steward and Viceroy, and the First Minister was subordinate to the Prime Minister. The de facto head of government was the First Minister.

=== Prime minister ===		Term of office		=== First Minister ===		Term of office		Government
Name (Birth–Death)	Picture	Term of office		Name (Birth–Death)	Picture	Term of office		Government
Peder Anker (1749–1824)		1814	1822	Frederik Gottschalk von Haxthausen (1750–1825)		1814	1814	Wedel I
Peder Anker (1749–1824)		1814	1822	Marcus Gjøe Rosenkrantz (1762–1838)		1814	1815	Wedel I
Peder Anker (1749–1824)		1814	1822	Mathias Sommerhielm (1764–1827)		1815	1822	Wedel I
Mathias Sommerhielm (1764–1827)		1822	1827	Jonas Collett (1772–1851)		1822	1836	Wedel I
Severin Løvenskiold (1777–1856)		1828	1841	Nicolai Johan Lohmann Krog (1787–1856)		1836	1855	Wedel II Løvenskiold/Vogt
Frederik Gottschalck Haxthausen Due (1796–1873)		1841	1858	Jørgen Herman Vogt (1784–1862)		1856	1858	Løvenskiold/Vogt Vogt
Georg Christian Sibbern (1816–1901)		1858	1871	Hans Christian Petersen (1793–1862)		1858	1861	Sibbern/Birch/Motzfeldt
Otto Richard Kierulf (1825–1897)		1871	1873	Frederik Stang (1808–1884)		1861	1873	Frederik Stang

=== Prime Minister in Christiania (1873–1905) ===
In 1873 the office of the First Minister of Norway was upgraded to prime minister, based in Christiania. The office of prime minister based in Stockholm continued, with responsibility for communicating the policies of the Prime Minister in Christiania to the King, making it subordinate to the office in Christiania. In addition, a separate Prime Minister of Sweden was appointed from 1876 onwards.

Liberal Party of Norway (Venstre)
Conservative Party (Høyre)
Coalition Party (Samlingspartiet)

=== Prime Minister in Stockholm ===			=== Prime Minister in Christiania ===			Term of office		Cabinet
Name (Birth-Death)	Picture	Political party	Name (Birth-Death)	Picture	Political party	Term of office		Cabinet
Otto Richard Kierulf (1825–1897)		N/A	Frederik Stang (1808–1884)		N/A	1873	1880	F.Stang
Otto Richard Kierulf (1825–1897)		N/A	Christian August Selmer (1816–1889)		Conservative Party	1880	1884	Selmer
Wolfgang Wenzel von Haffner (1806–1892) (acting)		N/A	Christian August Selmer (1816–1889)		Conservative Party	1884	1884	Selmer
Carl Otto Løvenskiold (1839–1916)		N/A	Christian Homann Schweigaard (1838–1899)		Conservative Party	1884	1884	Schweigaard
Ole Jørgensen Richter (1829–1888)		Liberal Party	Johan Sverdrup (1816–1892)		Liberal Party	1884	1888	Sverdrup; V
Hans Georg Jacob Stang (1830–1907)		Liberal Party	Johan Sverdrup (1816–1892)		Liberal Party	1888	1889	Sverdrup; V
Gregers Winther Wulfsberg Gram (1846–1929)		Conservative Party	Emil Stang (1834–1912)		Conservative Party	1889	1891	Stang I H
Otto Blehr (1847–1927)		Liberal Party	Johannes Steen (1827–1906)		Liberal Party	1891	1893	Steen I V
Gregers Winther Wulfsberg Gram (1846–1929)		Conservative Party	Emil Stang (1834–1912)		Conservative Party	1893	1895	Stang II; H
Gregers Winther Wulfsberg Gram (1846–1929)		Conservative Party	Francis Hagerup (1853–1921)		Conservative Party	1895	1898	Hagerup I H–MV–V
Otto Blehr (1853–1921)		Liberal Party	Johannes Steen (1827–1906)		Liberal Party	1898	1902	Steen II; V
Ole Anton Qvam (1834–1904)		Liberal Party	Otto Blehr (1847–1927)		Liberal Party	1902	1903	Blehr I V
Sigurd Ibsen (1859–1930)		Liberal Party	Francis Hagerup (1853–1921)		Coalition Party	1903	1905	Hagerup II; H–V
Jørgen Løvland (1848–1922)		Liberal Party	Christian Michelsen (1857–1925)		Liberal Party	1905	1905	Michelsen; V–H–MV

== Prime ministers of Norway (1905–present) ==
In 1905, the union between Sweden and Norway was dissolved. Since then the office of the prime minister of Norway has been in Oslo, except for the years of Nazi-German occupation during World War II when the Norwegian government was in exile in London.

=== Prime ministers of Norway (1905–1940) ===
Liberal Party (Venstre)}
Free-minded Liberal Party (Frisinnede Venstre)
Conservative Party (Høyre)
Norwegian Labour Party (Arbeiderpartiet)
Agrarian Party (Bondepartiet)

No.	Portrait	Name (birth–death)	Term of office			Party	Election	Cabinet coalition	Monarch (reign)
No.	Portrait	Name (birth–death)	Took office	Left office	Time in office	Party	Election	Cabinet coalition	Monarch (reign)
1		Christian Michelsen (1857–1925)	11 March 1905	23 October 1907	2 years, 226 days	Liberal Party	–	Michelsen; V–H–MV	Haakon VII (1905–1957)
1		Christian Michelsen (1857–1925)	11 March 1905	23 October 1907	2 years, 226 days	Liberal Party	1906	Michelsen; V–H–MV	Haakon VII (1905–1957)
2		Jørgen Løvland (1848–1922)	23 October 1907	19 March 1908	148 days	Liberal Party	–	Løvland; V–MV	Haakon VII (1905–1957)
3		Gunnar Knudsen (1848–1928)	19 March 1908	2 February 1910	1 year, 320 days	Liberal Party	–	Knudsen I V	Haakon VII (1905–1957)
3		Gunnar Knudsen (1848–1928)	19 March 1908	2 February 1910	1 year, 320 days	Liberal Party	1909	Knudsen I V	Haakon VII (1905–1957)
4		Wollert Konow (1845–1924)	2 February 1910	20 February 1912	2 years, 18 days	Free-minded Liberal Party	–	Konow; H–FV	Haakon VII (1905–1957)
5		Jens Bratlie (1856–1939)	20 February 1912	31 January 1913	346 days	Conservative Party	–	Bratlie; H–FV	Haakon VII (1905–1957)
5		Jens Bratlie (1856–1939)	20 February 1912	31 January 1913	346 days	Conservative Party	1912	Bratlie; H–FV	Haakon VII (1905–1957)
(3)		Gunnar Knudsen (1848–1928)	31 January 1913	21 June 1920	7 years, 142 days	Liberal Party	–	Knudsen II; V	Haakon VII (1905–1957)
(3)		Gunnar Knudsen (1848–1928)	31 January 1913	21 June 1920	7 years, 142 days	Liberal Party	1915	Knudsen II; V	Haakon VII (1905–1957)
(3)		Gunnar Knudsen (1848–1928)	31 January 1913	21 June 1920	7 years, 142 days	Liberal Party	1918	Knudsen II; V	Haakon VII (1905–1957)
6		Otto Bahr Halvorsen (1872–1923)	21 June 1920	22 June 1921	1 year, 1 day	Conservative Party	–	Bahr Halvorsen I H–FV	Haakon VII (1905–1957)
7		Otto Albert Blehr (1847–1927)	22 June 1921	6 March 1923	1 year, 257 days	Liberal Party	–	Blehr II; V	Haakon VII (1905–1957)
7		Otto Albert Blehr (1847–1927)	22 June 1921	6 March 1923	1 year, 257 days	Liberal Party	1921	Blehr II; V	Haakon VII (1905–1957)
(6)		Otto Bahr Halvorsen (1872–1923)	6 March 1923	23 May 1923	78 days	Conservative Party	–	Bahr Halvorsen II; H–FV	Haakon VII (1905–1957)
8		Abraham Berge (1851–1936)	30 May 1923	25 July 1924	1 year, 56 days	Free-minded Liberal Party	–	Berge; H–FV	Haakon VII (1905–1957)
9		Johan Ludwig Mowinckel (1870–1943)	25 July 1924	5 March 1926	1 year, 223 days	Liberal Party	–	Mowinckel I V	Haakon VII (1905–1957)
9		Johan Ludwig Mowinckel (1870–1943)	25 July 1924	5 March 1926	1 year, 223 days	Liberal Party	1924	Mowinckel I V	Haakon VII (1905–1957)
10		Ivar Lykke (1872–1949)	5 March 1926	28 January 1928	1 year, 329 days	Conservative Party	–	Lykke; H–FV	Haakon VII (1905–1957)
10		Ivar Lykke (1872–1949)	5 March 1926	28 January 1928	1 year, 329 days	Conservative Party	1927	Lykke; H–FV	Haakon VII (1905–1957)
11		Christopher Hornsrud (1859–1960)	28 January 1928	15 February 1928	18 days	Labour Party	–	Hornsrud; Ap	Haakon VII (1905–1957)
(9)		Johan Ludwig Mowinckel (1870–1943)	15 February 1928	12 May 1931	3 years, 86 days	Liberal Party	–	Mowinckel II; V	Haakon VII (1905–1957)
(9)		Johan Ludwig Mowinckel (1870–1943)	15 February 1928	12 May 1931	3 years, 86 days	Liberal Party	1930	Mowinckel II; V	Haakon VII (1905–1957)
12		Peder Kolstad (1878–1932)	12 May 1931	5 March 1932	298 days	Agrarian Party	–	Kolstad; B	Haakon VII (1905–1957)
13		Jens Hundseid (1883–1965)	14 March 1932	3 March 1933	354 days	Agrarian Party	–	Hundseid; B	Haakon VII (1905–1957)
(9)		Johan Ludwig Mowinckel (1870–1943)	3 March 1933	20 March 1935	2 years, 17 days	Liberal Party	–	Mowinckel III; V	Haakon VII (1905–1957)
(9)		Johan Ludwig Mowinckel (1870–1943)	3 March 1933	20 March 1935	2 years, 17 days	Liberal Party	1933	Mowinckel III; V	Haakon VII (1905–1957)
14		Johan Nygaardsvold (1879–1952)	20 March 1935 in exile from 1940	25 June 1945	10 years, 97 days	Labour Party	–	Nygaardsvold; Ap	Haakon VII (1905–1957)
14		Johan Nygaardsvold (1879–1952)	20 March 1935 in exile from 1940	25 June 1945	10 years, 97 days	Labour Party	1936	Nygaardsvold; Ap	Haakon VII (1905–1957)

=== Heads of Government (1940–1945) ===
Government sanction by Nazi Germany during the occupation of Norway. The Nygaardsvold exile government (1935–1945) is recognised as the elected government during the occupation.

National Unity (Nasjonal Samling)
Conservative Party (Høyre)
German Nazi Party (Nationalsozialistische Deutsche Arbeiterpartei)

Portrait	Name (birth–death)	Term of office			Party	Cabinet coalition
Portrait	Name (birth–death)	Took office	Left office	Time in office	Party	Cabinet coalition
	Vidkun Quisling (1887–1945); Disputed as Prime Minister	9 April 1940 (committed a coup d'état)	15 April 1940	6 days	National Unity	Quisling I NS Cabinet never officially formed as coup failed in 6 days
	Ingolf Elster Christensen (1872–1943) as Chairman of the Administrative Council	15 April 1940	25 September 1940	163 days	Conservative Party	Administrative Council
	Josef Terboven (1898–1945) as Reichskommissar	25 September 1940	7 May 1945	4 years, 224 days	Nazi Party	Reichskommissariat; NSDAP
	Vidkun Quisling (1887–1945) as Minister President, serving with Reichskommissar Josef Terboven	1 February 1942	9 May 1945	3 years, 97 days	National Unity	Quisling II; NS

=== Prime Ministers of Norway (1945–present) ===
Labour Party (Arbeiderpartiet)
Conservative Party (Høyre)
Centre Party (Senterpartiet)
Christian Democratic Party (Kristelig Folkeparti)

No.	Portrait	Name (birth–death)	Term of office			Party	Election	Cabinet coalition	Monarch (reign)
No.	Portrait	Name (birth–death)	Took office	Left office	Time in office	Party	Election	Cabinet coalition	Monarch (reign)
15		Einar Gerhardsen (1897–1987)	25 June 1945	19 November 1951	6 years, 147 days	Labour Party	—	Gerhardsen I Ap–H–Sp–V–NKP	Haakon VII (1905–1957)
15		Einar Gerhardsen (1897–1987)	25 June 1945	19 November 1951	6 years, 147 days	Labour Party	1945	Gerhardsen II; Ap	Haakon VII (1905–1957)
15		Einar Gerhardsen (1897–1987)	25 June 1945	19 November 1951	6 years, 147 days	Labour Party	1949	Gerhardsen II; Ap	Haakon VII (1905–1957)
16		Oscar Torp (1893–1958)	19 November 1951	22 January 1955	3 years, 64 days	Labour Party	1953	Torp; Ap	Haakon VII (1905–1957)
(15)		Einar Gerhardsen (1897–1987)	22 January 1955	28 August 1963	8 years, 218 days	Labour Party	—	Gerhardsen III; Ap	Haakon VII (1905–1957)
(15)		Einar Gerhardsen (1897–1987)	22 January 1955	28 August 1963	8 years, 218 days	Labour Party	1957	Gerhardsen III; Ap	Haakon VII (1905–1957)
(15)		Einar Gerhardsen (1897–1987)	22 January 1955	28 August 1963	8 years, 218 days	Labour Party	1957	Gerhardsen III; Ap	Olav V (1957–1991)
(15)		Einar Gerhardsen (1897–1987)	22 January 1955	28 August 1963	8 years, 218 days	Labour Party	1961	Gerhardsen III; Ap	Olav V (1957–1991)
17		John Lyng (1905–1978)	28 August 1963	25 September 1963	28 days	Conservative Party	—	Lyng; H–Sp–KrF–V	Olav V (1957–1991)
(15)		Einar Gerhardsen (1897–1987)	25 September 1963	12 October 1965	2 years, 17 days	Labour Party	—	Gerhardsen IV; Ap	Olav V (1957–1991)
18		Per Borten (1913–2005)	12 October 1965	17 March 1971	5 years, 156 days	Centre Party	1965	Borten; Sp–H–KrF–V	Olav V (1957–1991)
18		Per Borten (1913–2005)	12 October 1965	17 March 1971	5 years, 156 days	Centre Party	1969	Borten; Sp–H–KrF–V	Olav V (1957–1991)
19		Trygve Bratteli (1910–1984)	17 March 1971	18 October 1972	1 year, 215 days	Labour Party	—	Bratteli I Ap	Olav V (1957–1991)
20		Lars Korvald (1916–2006)	18 October 1972	16 October 1973	363 days	Christian Democratic Party	—	Korvald; KrF–Sp–V	Olav V (1957–1991)
(19)		Trygve Bratteli (1910–1984)	16 October 1973	15 January 1976	2 years, 91 days	Labour Party	1973	Bratteli II; Ap	Olav V (1957–1991)
21		Odvar Nordli (1927–2018)	15 January 1976	4 February 1981	5 years, 20 days	Labour Party	—	Nordli; Ap	Olav V (1957–1991)
21		Odvar Nordli (1927–2018)	15 January 1976	4 February 1981	5 years, 20 days	Labour Party	1977	Nordli; Ap	Olav V (1957–1991)
22		Gro Harlem Brundtland (born 1939)	4 February 1981	14 October 1981	252 days	Labour Party	—	Brundtland I Ap	Olav V (1957–1991)
23		Kåre Willoch (1928–2021)	14 October 1981	9 May 1986	4 years, 207 days	Conservative Party	1981	Willoch I H	Olav V (1957–1991)
23		Kåre Willoch (1928–2021)	14 October 1981	9 May 1986	4 years, 207 days	Conservative Party	1985	Willoch II; H–KrF–Sp	Olav V (1957–1991)
(22)		Gro Harlem Brundtland (born 1939)	9 May 1986	16 October 1989	3 years, 160 days	Labour Party	—	Brundtland II; Ap	Olav V (1957–1991)
24		Jan Peder Syse (1930–1997)	16 October 1989	3 November 1990	1 year, 18 days	Conservative Party	1989	Syse; H–KrF–Sp	Olav V (1957–1991)
(22)		Gro Harlem Brundtland (born 1939)	3 November 1990	25 October 1996	5 years, 357 days	Labour Party	—	Brundtland III; Ap	Olav V (1957–1991)
(22)		Gro Harlem Brundtland (born 1939)	3 November 1990	25 October 1996	5 years, 357 days	Labour Party	—	Brundtland III; Ap	Harald V (1991–2026)
(22)		Gro Harlem Brundtland (born 1939)	3 November 1990	25 October 1996	5 years, 357 days	Labour Party	1993	Brundtland III; Ap	Harald V (1991–2026)
25		Thorbjørn Jagland (born 1950)	25 October 1996	17 October 1997	357 days	Labour Party	—	Jagland; Ap	Harald V (1991–2026)
26		Kjell Magne Bondevik (born 1947)	17 October 1997	17 March 2000	2 years, 152 days	Christian Democratic Party	1997	Bondevik I KrF–Sp–V	Harald V (1991–2026)
27		Jens Stoltenberg (born 1959)	17 March 2000	19 October 2001	1 year, 216 days	Labour Party	—	Stoltenberg I Ap	Harald V (1991–2026)
(26)		Kjell Magne Bondevik (born 1947)	19 October 2001	17 October 2005	3 years, 363 days	Christian Democratic Party	2001	Bondevik II; KrF–H–V	Harald V (1991–2026)
(27)		Jens Stoltenberg (born 1959)	17 October 2005	16 October 2013	7 years, 364 days	Labour Party	2005	Stoltenberg II; Ap–SV–Sp	Harald V (1991–2026)
(27)		Jens Stoltenberg (born 1959)	17 October 2005	16 October 2013	7 years, 364 days	Labour Party	2009	Stoltenberg II; Ap–SV–Sp	Harald V (1991–2026)
28		Erna Solberg (born 1961)	16 October 2013	14 October 2021	7 years, 363 days	Conservative Party	2013	Solberg; H–FrP	Harald V (1991–2026)
28		Erna Solberg (born 1961)	16 October 2013	14 October 2021	7 years, 363 days	Conservative Party	2017	Solberg; H–FrP–V	Harald V (1991–2026)
28		Erna Solberg (born 1961)	16 October 2013	14 October 2021	7 years, 363 days	Conservative Party	—	Solberg; H–FrP–V-KrF	Harald V (1991–2026)
28		Erna Solberg (born 1961)	16 October 2013	14 October 2021	7 years, 363 days	Conservative Party	—	Solberg; H–V–KrF	Harald V (1991–2026)
29		Jonas Gahr Støre (born 1960)	14 October 2021	Incumbent	5 years, 33 days	Labour Party	2021	Støre; Ap–Sp	Harald V (1991–2026)
29		Jonas Gahr Støre (born 1960)	14 October 2021	Incumbent	5 years, 33 days	Labour Party	—	Støre; Ap	Harald V (1991–2026)
29		Jonas Gahr Støre (born 1960)	14 October 2021	Incumbent	5 years, 33 days	Labour Party	2025	Støre; Ap	Harald V (1991–2026)
29		Jonas Gahr Støre (born 1960)	14 October 2021	Incumbent	5 years, 33 days	Labour Party	2025	Støre; Ap	Haakon VIII (2026-present)

== See also ==
- List of Norwegian monarchs
- List of Norwegian governments
