= Johan Christian Collett =

Norwegian politician (1817–1895)

Johan Christian Collett (23 July 1817 – 29 April 1895) was a Norwegian politician.

== Personal life ==
Johan Christian Collett was the son of Johan Collett (1775-1827), who was among the founders of the Norwegian Constitution, and Christiane Birgithe de Stockfleth (1782-1829). He had four brothers and six sisters, although three siblings died young. His brother Peter Jonas Collett was a prominent jurist and literary critic who married Camilla Wergeland, and his sister Sophie Augusta married Peter Severin Steenstrup. He married his second cousin Johanne Christiane Collett (1822-1914). The couple had two daughters.

== Career ==
He was County Governor of Kristians amt (today named Oppland) from 1854 to 1859 and of Akershus amt from 1859 to 1895. He was acting Minister of the Interior in 1861, temporarily appointed councillor of state in interim 1881, and acting Minister of Auditing in 1884.

He was awarded the Order of St. Olav in 1892.

== See also ==
- Collett family

Civic offices
Preceded by Hans Tostrup	County Governor of Oppland; 1854–1859	Succeeded by Christian Jensen
Preceded by Christian Birch-Reichenwald	County Governor of Akershus; 1859–1895	Succeeded by Ole Andreas Furu
Political offices
Preceded by Christian Bretteville	Norwegian Minister of the Interior; 1861 (acting)	Succeeded by August Christian Manthey
Preceded by Ole Bachke	Norwegian Minister of Auditing; 1884 (acting)	Succeeded by Christian Schweigaard
