= Ole Anton Qvam =

Norwegian politician

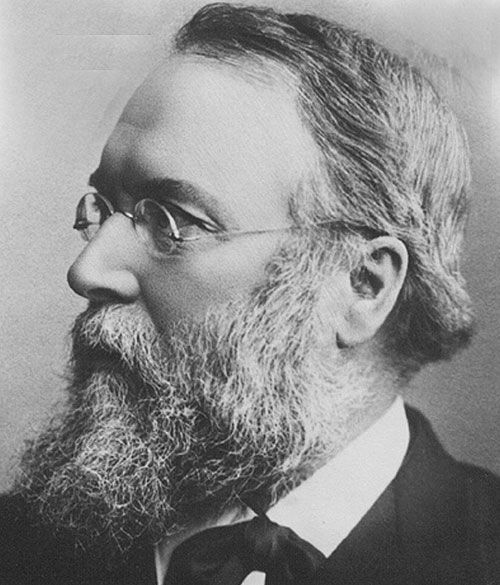

Norwegian Prime Minister in Stockholm
- In office 21 April 1902 – 22 October 1903
- Monarch: Oscar II
- Prime Minister: Otto Blehr
- Preceded by: Otto Blehr
- Succeeded by: Sigurd Ibsen

Minister of Justice
- In office 6 November 1900 – 21 April 1902
- Prime Minister: Johannes Steen
- Preceded by: Einar Løchen
- Succeeded by: Søren Årstad
- In office 17 February 1898 – 28 April 1899
- Prime Minister: Johannes Steen
- Preceded by: Harald Smedal
- Succeeded by: Einar Løchen
- In office 6 March 1891 – 2 May 1893
- Prime Minister: Johannes Steen
- Preceded by: Ulrik Arneberg
- Succeeded by: Francis Hagerup

Minister of Agriculture
- In office 1 April 1900 – 6 November 1900
- Prime Minister: Johannes Steen
- Preceded by: Position established
- Succeeded by: Wollert Konow (H)

Minister of Auditing
- In office 29 February 1900 – 6 November 1900
- Prime Minister: Johannes Steen
- Preceded by: Johannes Steen
- Succeeded by: Wollert Konow (H)

Minister of the Interior
- In office 28 April 1899 – 24 March 1900
- Prime Minister: Johannes Steen
- Preceded by: Georg A. Thilesen
- Succeeded by: Johannes Steen

Leader of the Liberal Party
- In office 1894–1896
- Preceded by: Viggo Ullmann
- Succeeded by: Johannes Steen
- In office 1884–1889
- Preceded by: Johan Sverdrup
- Succeeded by: Johannes Steen

Personal details
- Born: 5 August 1834 Bolsøy, Romsdalen, United Kingdoms of Sweden and Norway
- Died: 8 July 1904 (aged 69) Steinkjer, Nordre Trondheim, United Kingdoms of Sweden and Norway
- Party: Liberal
- Spouse: Fredrikke Marie Qvam

Ole Anton Qvam (5 August 1834 – 8 July 1904) was a Norwegian lawyer and Liberal politician, who was the Norwegian minister of Justice 1891–1893, 1898–1899 and 1900–1902, minister of the Interior 1899–1900, as well as head of the ministry of Auditing, ministry of Agriculture and ministry of Justice in 1900, and Norwegian prime minister in Stockholm 1902–1903.

== Biography ==
Ole Anton Qvam was born in Bolsøy in today's Molde Municipality in Møre og Romsdal county, Norway. He was the son of Ole Larsen Qvam (1782–1844) and Johanne Pedersdatter Ryen (1797–1850). Qvam worked as a teacher in Christiania, Arendal and Setesdal. He began studying law at the University of Christiania and became cand.jur. 1862. He founded the Sparbu and Egge savings bank in 1872, where he was chairman of the board 1873–1886. Mayor of Egge from 1869 to 1885.

Qvam was elected to the Storting for Nordre Trondhjem county from 1874 to 1885 and for Søndre Trondhjem county from 1885 to 1888. He served as president of the Odelstinget from 1886 to 1888. Qvam was Minister of Justice in the first government of Johannes Steen from March 6, 1891 to May 1, 1893, and later also Justice Minister of Johannes Steen's second government from February 17, 1898 to April 1899. On April 21, 1902, Qvam became Norway's Prime Minister in Stockholm during the first government of Otto Blehr.

He was married to feminist pioneer Fredrikke Marie Qvam (1843-1938) who was President of the Norwegian Association for Women's Rights and founded the Norwegian Women's Public Health Association. Both he and his wife were co-founders of the Norwegian Association for Women's Rights in 1884. He retired from government during 1903. He died at Egge on July 8, 1904.

Civic offices
Preceded by Lars Otto Roll Grundt	County Governor of Nordre Trondhjem; 1894–1898	Succeeded by Halvor Bachke Guldahl
