= Hans Gerhard Colbjørnsen Meldahl =

Norwegian jurist and politician

Hans Gerhard Colbjørnsen Meldahl (5 October 1815 – 25 December 1877) was a Norwegian jurist and politician.

He was elected to the Norwegian Parliament in 1854 and 1857, representing the constituency of Trondhjem og Levanger. He was Minister of Justice and the Police from 17 December 1861 to 8 January 1874, except for the periods October 1863 to September 1864, October 1866 to October 1867, June 1869 to July 1870 and October 1871 to September 1872 when he was assigned as a member of the Council of State Division in Stockholm.

Outside politics he was a jurist and had graduated as cand.jur. in 1837. In 1854 he was a stipendiary magistrate (byfoged) of Trondhjem; in 1857 he had been appointed Supreme Court judge. He served as the sixth Chief Justice of the Supreme Court of Norway from 1874 to 1877.

Legal offices
Preceded by Erik Røring Møinichen	Norwegian Minister of Justice and the Police; 1861–1863	Succeeded by August Christian Manthey
Preceded by August Christian Manthey	Norwegian Minister of Justice and the Police; 1864–1866	Succeeded by Erik Røring Møinichen
Preceded by Erik Røring Møinichen	Norwegian Minister of Justice and the Police; 1867–1869	Succeeded by August Christian Manthey
Preceded by Johan Collett Falsen	Norwegian Minister of Justice and the Police; 1870–1871	Succeeded by Johan Collett Falsen
Preceded by Johan Collett Falsen	Norwegian Minister of Justice and the Police; 1872–1874	Succeeded by Jacob Aall (acting)
Preceded by Peder Carl Lasson	Chief Justice of the Supreme Court of Norway; 1874–1877	Succeeded by Iver Steen Thomle
