= Hans Hagerup Falbe =

Norwegian politician

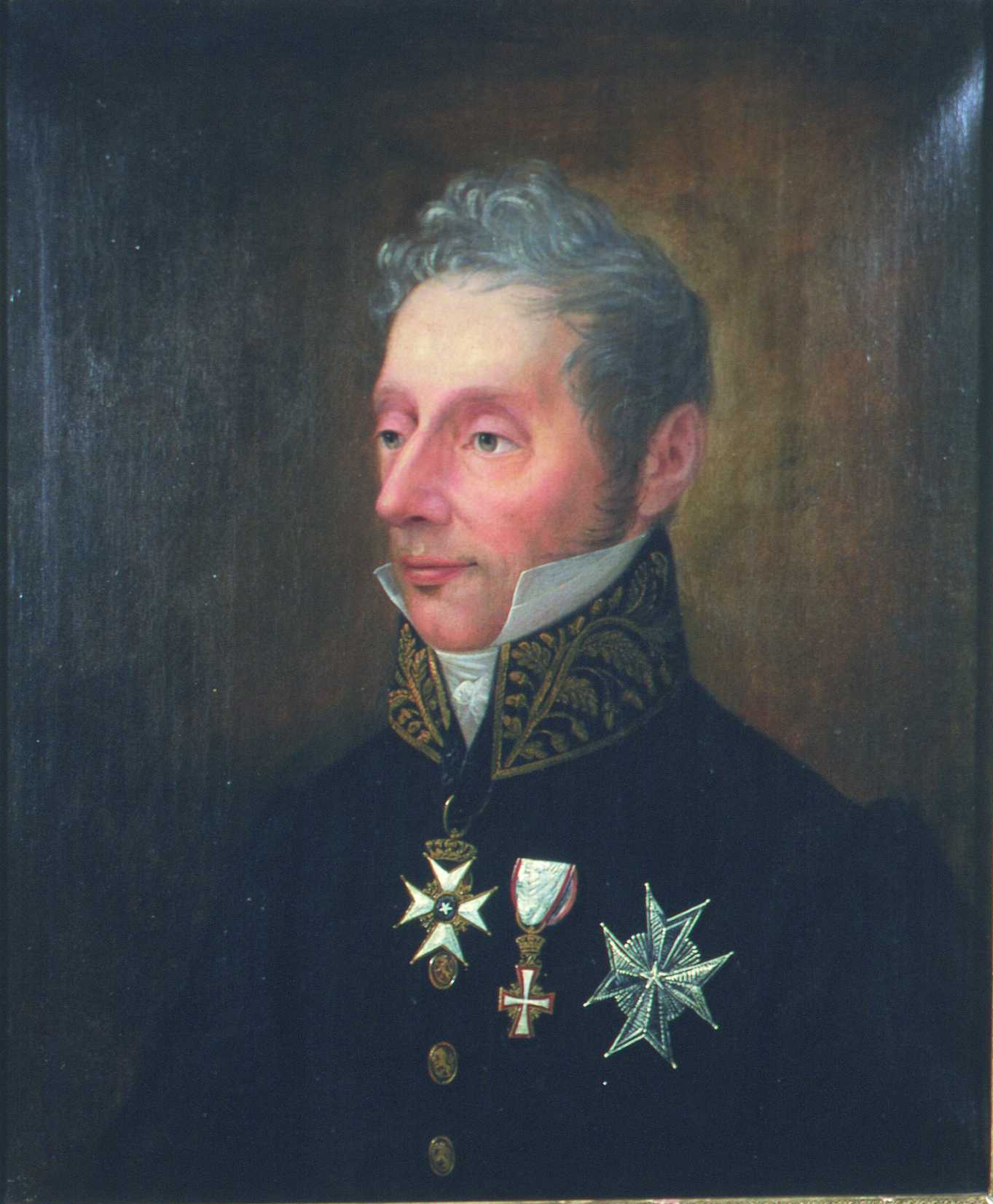
Hans Hagerup Falbe

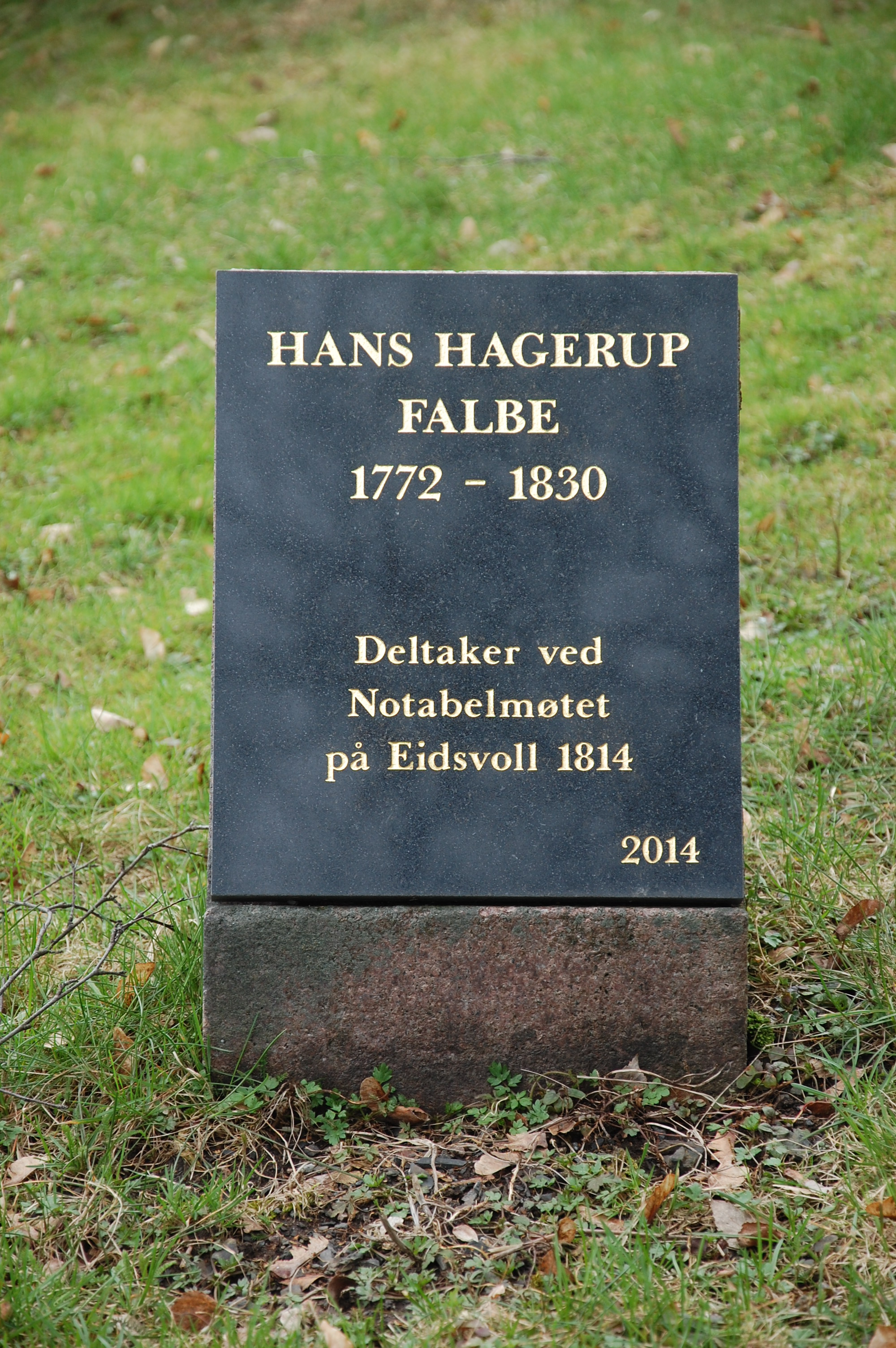
Hans Hagerup Falbe grave site at Vår Frelsers gravlund, Oslo.

Hans Hagerup Falbe (7 February 1772 – 17 October 1830) was a Norwegian lawyer, judge and government official. He served as a member of the Norwegian Council of State Department in Stockholm (Norske statsråder i Stockholm).

Falbe was born in Copenhagen, Denmark. He was the son of Councillor of State Johan Christian Falbe (1740–1801) and Anna Cathrine Hagerup de Gyldenpalm (1741–1815). During 1791, he earned a law degree at the University of Copenhagen.

From 1799 to 1809, he was a court assessor. Between 1809 and 1815, he was Chief Justice of the Criminal Court in Christiania (now Oslo). During 1814 he participated in the Meeting of Notables at Eidsvoll (Stormannsmøtet på Eidsvoll) which convened in the aftermath of the Treaty of Kiel. In 1815 he was appointed district governor in Akershus Amt. Between 1815 and 1822, he was Chief Justice of Akershus stift (Akershus stiftsoverrett).

Falbe was an acting member of the Council of State Division in Stockholm from 1822–1824 (appointed member 1823), 1825–1826 and 1829–1830, Minister of Auditing 1824–1825 and 1828–1829, Minister of the Navy 1826–1827 and Minister of Justice 1827–1828. He died during 1830 and was buried at Vår Frelsers gravlund in Oslo.
