= Mathias Sommerhielm =

Danish-Norwegian politician

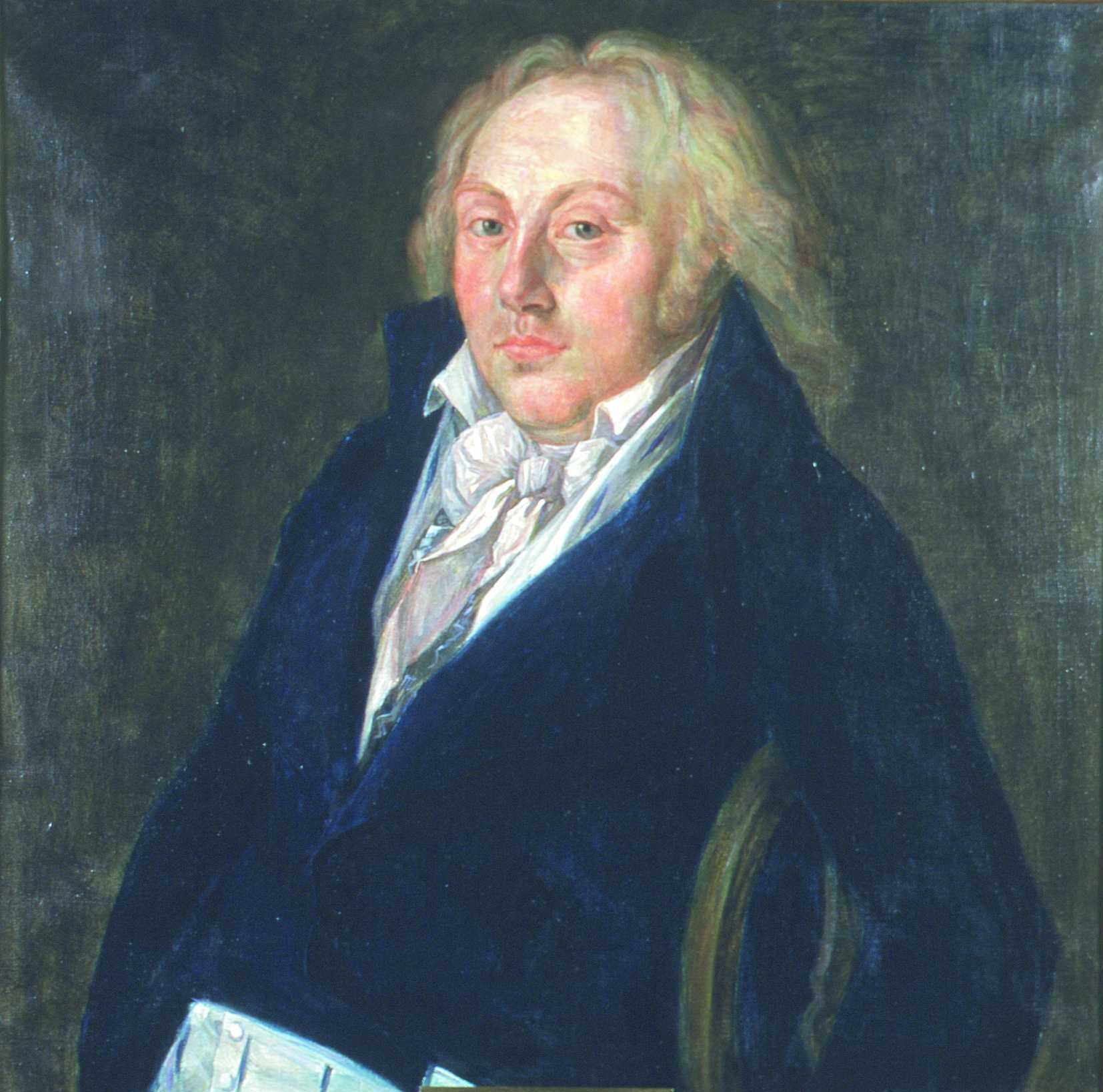
- Painting of Mathias Sommerhielm

Norwegian Prime Minister in Stockholm
- In office 9 July 1822 – 15 November 1827
- Monarch: Charles III John
- Preceded by: Peder Anker
- Succeeded by: Severin Løvenskiold

Minister of Justice
- In office 15 September 1816 – 15 May 1817
- Prime Minister: Peder Anker
- Preceded by: Christian A. Diriks
- Succeeded by: Christian A. Diriks
- In office 27 November 1814 – 15 June 1815
- Prime Minister: Peder Anker
- Preceded by: Position established
- Succeeded by: Christian A. Diriks

Personal details
- Born: Mathias Otto Leth Sommerhielm; 22 August 1764 Kolding, Denmark
- Died: 15 November 1827 (aged 63) Stockholm, Sweden

Mathias Otto Leth Sommerhielm (22 August 1764 – 15 November 1827) was a Danish-Norwegian politician who served as the Norwegian prime minister in Stockholm.

== Biography ==
Mathias Otto Leth Sommerhielm was born in the seaport of Kolding in southern Denmark. He graduated from the University of Copenhagen with degrees in Latin and Law in 1785. He subsequently moved to Christiania where he was appointed a prosecutor in 1789. In 1801, Sommerhielm became director general of military prosecutions and in 1807 he became member of the Superior Criminal Court.

After the dissolution of the union between Denmark and Norway, he attended the Meeting of Notables in Eidsvoll on 16 February 1814. He served as First Minister from 1815 to 1822, a position assigned to the most prominent cabinet minister at the time. In 1822, Sommerhielm was appointed Prime Minister of Norway, following the resignation of Peder Anker due to personal illness. Sommerhielm became Norway's second prime minister, an office located in Stockholm. He held the office until 1827, when the seat was vacated. He died in Stockholm later that year.

== Awards ==
Sommerhielm was awarded the Order of the Dannebrog (Dannebrogordenen), Order of the Polar Star (Nordstjerneorden) and Seraphim Medal (Serafimerordenen).
