= Thomas Cathinco Bang =

Norwegian politician (1827–1902)

Thomas Cathinco Bang (25 January 1827 – 13 April 1902) was Norwegian Minister of the Interior in 1884. Bang was mayor of Drammen in 1872, and represented the town in the Norwegian Parliament from 1877 to 1894. He served as County Governor of Buskerud before being appointed to the Schweigaard Government in 1884. After serving in the government he went back to being mayor of Drammen, and after moving to Kristiania in 1889, again served as County Governor of Buskerud until his death in 1902.
