= Christian Homann Schweigaard =

Norwegian politician

Christian Schweigaard MP
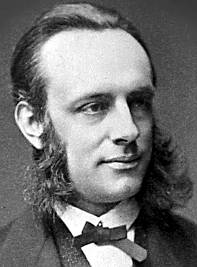
- Christian Schweigaard

Prime Minister of Norway in Christiania
- In office 3 April 1884 – 26 June 1884
- Monarch: Oscar II
- Preceded by: Christian A. Selmer
- Succeeded by: Johan Sverdrup

Minister of Finance
- In office 15 September 1883 – 3 April 1884
- Prime Minister: Christian A. Selmer
- Preceded by: Henrik L. Helliesen
- Succeeded by: Herman Reimers

Minister of Justice
- In office 26 March 1884 – 3 April 1884
- Prime Minister: Christian A. Selmer
- Preceded by: Christian Jensen
- Succeeded by: Ludvig Aubert
- In office 26 September 1881 – 15 November 1881
- Prime Minister: Christian A. Selmer
- Preceded by: Christian Jensen
- Succeeded by: Ole A. Bachke

Member of the Norwegian Parliament
- In office 1 January 1886 – 31 December 1897
- Constituency: Holmestrand

Leader of the Conservative Party
- In office 1893–1896
- Preceded by: Emil Stang
- Succeeded by: Emil Stang
- In office 1889–1891
- Preceded by: Emil Stang
- Succeeded by: Emil Stang

Personal details
- Born: Christian Homann Schweigaard; 14 October 1838 Christiania, United Kingdoms of Sweden and Norway
- Died: 24 March 1899 (aged 60) Christiania, United Kingdoms of Sweden and Norway
- Party: Conservative
- Spouse: Caroline Magnine Homann (m. 1867)
- Children: Anton Martin Schweigaard jr.
- Occupation: Politician
- Profession: Clerk

Christian Homann Schweigaard (14 October 1838 – 24 March 1899) was a Norwegian politician of the Conservative Party. He served as the prime minister for two months in 1884, a period after the impeachment of his predecessor Christian August Selmer called Schweigaard's Ministerium. Schweigaard held a number of key positions, including Chairman of the Conservative Party from 1889–1891 and 1893–1896, as well as Parliamentary Leader from 1889–1891 and 1894–1895. He was Emil Stang's indispensable partner, leading the Conservative Party's policy and organizational development in the 1880s and 1890s.

== Background ==
Schweigaard was born in Christiania (now Oslo, Norway). He was the son of Anton Martin Schweigaard and Caroline Magnine Homan. He took his final exams in 1855 and then studied law. He studied law for a year in London and Paris becoming a lawyer in 1863.

== Career ==
In 1864, he appeared as a lawyer before the Supreme Court of Norway. He served as a Member of Norwegian Parliament from 1886 to 1897. Schweigaard was a member of the Royal Commission on the enlargement of Christiania in 1873 and a Member of the Parliamentary Tax Commission in 1877. Schweigaard served as Minister of the Audit from 1880 until 1882, as Minister of Justice from September to October 1881. He also served as a member of the Council of State Division in Stockholm from September 1882 to August 1883. He was the Finance Minister from September 1883 to April 1884.

After Selmer's impeachment, Emil Stang was commissioned to form a new government, but the Conservative Party's parliamentary group could not spare Stang's parliamentary talent, and it was therefore Schweigaard's task to lead the April Ministry, which came to be called Schweigaard's Ministerium. The government, in which Schweigaard served as Prime Minister and as head of the Audit Department, took office on 3 April 1884. Threats of a new impeachment, a divided Conservative Party, a conflict of Swedish public opinion, and an uncertain King Oscar II eventually led to Schweigaard's resignation on 31 May, which was granted on 26 June 1884.

Schweigaard was elected as the Member of Parliament from Holmestrand 1886–1897. He was Odelsting presidential and parliamentary leader from 1889-1891 and 1894–1895. Schweigaard was elected to the Christiania City Council 1873–1880 and 1885–1894 and was Mayor of Christiania from 1879–1880 and 1885–1888. He was the Chairman of the Conservative Party from 1889–1891 and 1893–1896.

== Personal life ==
Schweigaard was married in 1867 to Thea Meyer (1846-1922). He was appointed Knight of the 1st Class Order of St. Olav in 1880 and commander of the 1st class 1890, he was commander of the Swedish Nordstjärneorden. Schweigaard died during 1899 and was buried at Vår Frelsers gravlund in Oslo.

Political offices
Preceded by Christian August Selmer	Prime Minister of Norway; 1884	Succeeded by Johan Sverdrup
Preceded by Anders Sandøe Ørsted Bull	Mayor of Christiania (Oslo); 1879–1880	Succeeded by Anton Blumenthal Petersen
Preceded by Anton Blumenthal Petersen	Mayor of Christiania (Oslo); 1885–1889	Succeeded by Peter Birch-Reichenwald
