= Niels Petersen Vogt =

Norwegian civil servant and politician

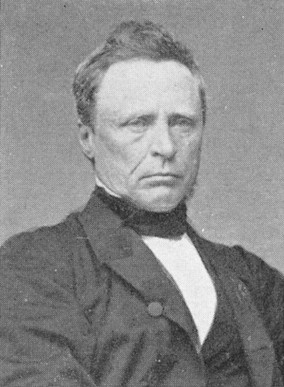

County Governor of Søndre Bergenhus amt
- In office 1850–1860
- Preceded by: Jens Schydtz
- Succeeded by: Hans Thomas Meinich

Diocesan Governor of Christianssand stiftamt
- In office 1860–1871
- Preceded by: Mathias Bille Kjørboe
- Succeeded by: Jakob Krefting Bonnevie

County Governor of Buskerud amt
- In office 1884–1890
- Preceded by: Thomas Cathinco Bang
- Succeeded by: Thomas Cathinco Bang

Personal details
- Born: 15 April 1817 Christiania, Norway
- Died: 8 November 1894 (aged 77) Kristiania, Norway
- Citizenship: Norway
- Parents: Peter Monrad Vogt (father); Charlotte Juhl (mother)
- Education: Cand.jur. (1839)
- Profession: Politician

Niels Petersen Vogt (15 April 1817–8 November 1894) was a Norwegian civil servant and politician. He served as the Norwegian Minister of the Interior five times between 1871 and 1884, and member of the Council of State Division in Stockholm four times 1872–1883. He also served as County Governor in three different counties.

== Career ==
He graduated with a Cand.jur. degree in 1839 and was immediately employed by the Ministry of Justice. He became bureau chief in 1843 and was promoted in 1847. From 1841 to 1842 he was also the acting mayor in Stavanger.

Vogt was appointed as the County Governor of Søndre Bergenhus amt from 1850 until 1860. During that time, he was elected to the Storting from Bergen in 1857. In 1860, he was appointed to be the County Governor of Christianssand stiftamt and the County Governor of Lister og Mandals amt. He was then elected from Kristiansand in 1862 and re-elected in 1865, 1868 and 1871. From 1865 to 1866 he was also the President of the Storting. He resigned as County Governor in 1871.

On 13 May 1871, he was appointed head of the Ministry of the Interior in Frederik Stang's Ministerium. Later, he was alternately a member of the Prime Minister's Department in Stockholm and Minister of the Interior until 1884. In the autumn of 1879, he also headed the Ministry of Justice and Police for six weeks. Like most of the members of Christian August Selmer's ministry (1880–1884), he was deposed by the Prime Minister in March 1884.

After his resignation as minister in 1884, he was appointed County Governor of Buskerud county, a position he held until his resignation in 1890.

== Personal life ==
He was the son of Peter Monrad Vogt, who was the head of the Church Ministry, and his wife Charlotte Juhl, and in 1843 he married Karen Magdalena Arntzen (1819–1870).

In 1860 Vogt was appointed a knight of the Order of St. Olav, and in 1866 promoted to commander. He was the holder of the Grand Cross of the Swedish Order of the North Star and was a knight of the first class of the Austrian Order of the Iron Crown.

Government offices
Preceded by Jens Schydtz	County Governor of Søndre Bergenhus amt 1850–1860	Succeeded by Hans Thomas Meinich
Preceded by Mathias Bille Kjørboe	County Governor of Lister og Mandal amt 1860–1871	Succeeded by Jakob Krefting Bonnevie
Preceded by Mathias Bille Kjørboe	Diocesan Governor of Christianssand stiftamt 1860–1871	Succeeded by Jakob Krefting Bonnevie
Preceded by Thomas Cathinco Bang	County Governor of Buskerud amt 1884–1890	Succeeded by Thomas Cathinco Bang
