= Poul Christian Holst =

Norwegian government official (1776–1863)

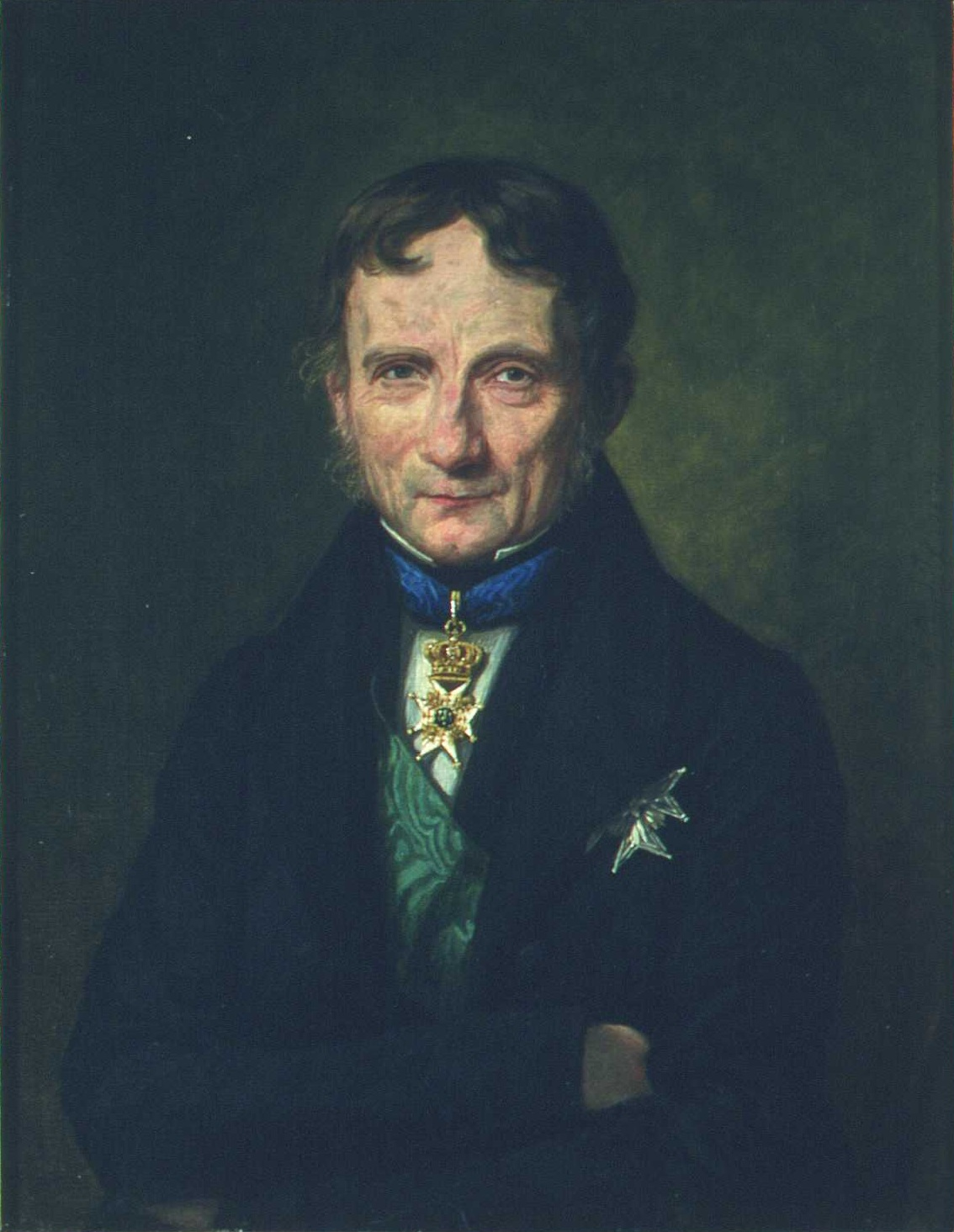
Poul Christian Holst in 1839.

Poul Christian Holst (21 January 1776 – 7 August 1863) was a Norwegian government official who held several positions in the period 1814–1848. Holst led negotiations over debt with Denmark in 1817, after the dissolution of the union between the two countries in 1814.

== Biography ==
Holst was born at Røyken in Buskerud, Norway. He was the son of parish priest Christian Holst (1743–1824) and Marthe Grønbech (1743–1786). He studied both theology and law at the University of Copenhagen from which he graduated in 1798. In 1806 as, he was bailiff at Akershus Castle. In 1813, he was appointed acting district governor in Akershus.

He was the functioning head of the First Ministry (finance and taxes) in 1814, state secretary 1814–1822, member of the Council of State Division in Stockholm in various periods between 1823–1844, Minister of the Navy 1824–1825, Minister of Justice 1825–1826, 1827–1832, 1833–1836 and 1837–1838, and Minister of Education and Church Affairs 1822–1823, 1835, 1836–1839, 1840–1843 and 1844–1848.

== Personal life ==
He was married in 1804 to Bodil Cecilie Klinck (1781–1856), daughter Jens Peter Klinck (1742–1804) and Christiane Amalie Schmidt (1742–1802). He died in Christiania (now Oslo) in 1863 and was buried at Vår Frelsers gravlund. His memoires were published posthumously, in the years 1875 and 1876, under the title P. C. Holsts Efterladte Optegnelser om sit Liv og sin Samtid (P. C. Holts' Surviving Writings about His Life and His Times).
