= Søren Anton Wilhelm Sørenssen =

Norwegian jurist and politician

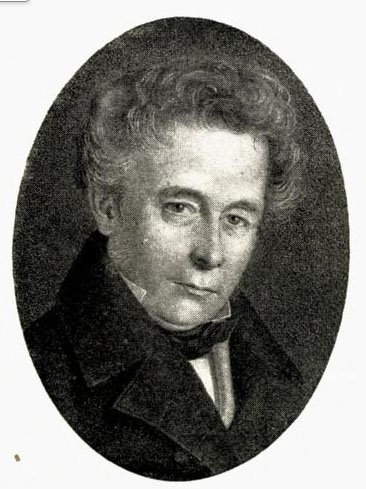
Søren Anton Wilhelm Sørenssen

Søren Anton Wilhelm Sørenssen (22 August 1793 – 28 June 1853) was a Norwegian jurist and politician.

Sørenssen was born at Drammen in Buskerud, Norway. He was a supreme court lawyer in Oslo from 1822 to 1839. He led the impeachment cases against Jonas Collett in 1827 and Severin Løvenskiold in 1836. From 1839, he served as Magistrate in Aker.

He was a member of the Parliament of Norway from 1830 to 1845 where he served as President and Vice President of the Parliament of Norway in all periods. Sørenssen's 1833 proposal for constitutional freedom of religion led to the repeal of the Conventicle Act, banning religious gatherings outside of the Church of Norway, in 1842. He was the Norwegian Minister of Justice 1848–1850 and 1851–1853, and member of the Council of State Division in Stockholm under Frederik Due 1850–1851.
