= Christian August Selmer =

Norwegian politician

Christian Selmer MP
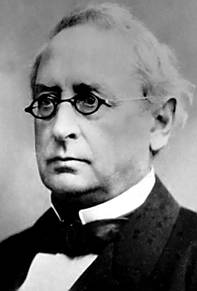
- Christian Selmer

Prime Minister of Norway in Christiania
- In office 11 October 1880 – 3 April 1884
- Monarch: Oscar II
- Preceded by: Frederik Stang
- Succeeded by: Christian H. Schweigaard

Minister of the Army
- In office 13 October 1879 – 15 September 1880
- Prime Minister: Frederik Stang
- Preceded by: Adolph F. Munthe
- Succeeded by: Adolph F. Munthe
- In office 29 July 1874 – 21 July 1875
- Prime Minister: Frederik Stang
- Preceded by: Lorentz Segelcke
- Succeeded by: Lorentz Segelcke

Minister of the Interior
- In office 15 August 1878 – 15 August 1879
- Prime Minister: Frederik Stang
- Preceded by: Niels Vogt
- Succeeded by: Niels Vogt
- In office 21 July 1875 – 15 August 1876
- Prime Minister: Frederik Stang
- Preceded by: Niels Vogt
- Succeeded by: Niels Vogt

Minister of Justice
- In office 15 August 1877 – 15 August 1878
- Prime Minister: Frederik Stang
- Preceded by: John Collett Falsen
- Succeeded by: John Collett Falsen

Minister of Auditing
- In office 13 June 1879 – 13 October 1879
- Prime Minister: Frederik Stang
- Preceded by: Jacob Aall jr.
- Succeeded by: Christian Jensen

Personal details
- Born: 16 November 1816 Fredrikshald, Østfold, United Kingdoms of Sweden and Norway
- Died: 1 November 1889 (aged 72) Bygdøy (now in Oslo), United Kingdoms of Sweden and Norway
- Party: Conservative
- Spouse: Anna Sylvia Leganger
- Children: Jørgen; Ida
- Occupation: Magistrate
- Profession: Attorney

Christian August Selmer (16 November 1816 – 1 September 1889) was a Norwegian lawyer and a magistrate. He served as a member of the Norwegian Parliament, Minister of Defense and Minister of Justice. He was the prime minister of Norway in Christiana between 1880 and 1884.

== Background ==
Selmer was born at Fredrikshald in Østfold, Norway and grew up in Halden. He was the son of Johan Christian Selmer (1783-1830) and Johanne Ditlevine Michea Vibe (1788-1879). Selmer studied law at the University of Christiania from 1837, achieved his legal degree in 1842. In 1842, he was magistrate in Sør-Hedmark. In 1848, he was appointed law clerk in the office of attorney P.A. Midelfart in Drammen. In 1850, he took over the firm and developed an extensive legal practice. He served as a stipendiary magistrate in Drammen from 1862 until 1874. In 1848 he married Anna Sylvia Leganger (1825–1896).

== Career ==
Selmer served as deputy to Parliament for Drammen from 1871 until 1873 and permanent representative from 1874 until 1876. In 1874 joined the cabinet of Prime Minister Frederik Stang. Following the surprising resignation of Frederik Stang as prime minister in September 1880, King Oscar II of Sweden had Selmer in mind as Norwegian prime minister. Selmer's record as prime minister was characterized by conflict over whether members of the cabinet were required to appear in Parliament to answer questions. He influenced King Oscar II to reject efforts at a compromise, setting the stage for impeachment proceedings. In April 1883 the members of the lower house (Odelsting) decided to impeach the members of the Selmer cabinet. Selmer was subsequently convicted under articles of impeachment and resigned as prime minister on March 1, 1884.

Subsequently, Selmer became acting general auditor (Generalauditør) of the Royal Norwegian Army and Royal Norwegian Navy, He held this office until his death at Bygdøy in Aker during September 1889. He was buried at Vår Frelsers gravlund in Kristiania.

Political offices
| Preceded by Frederik Stang | Prime Minister of Norway; 1880–1884 | Succeeded by Christian Homann Schweigaard |
