= Ole Andreas Bachke =

Norwegian politician (1830–1890)

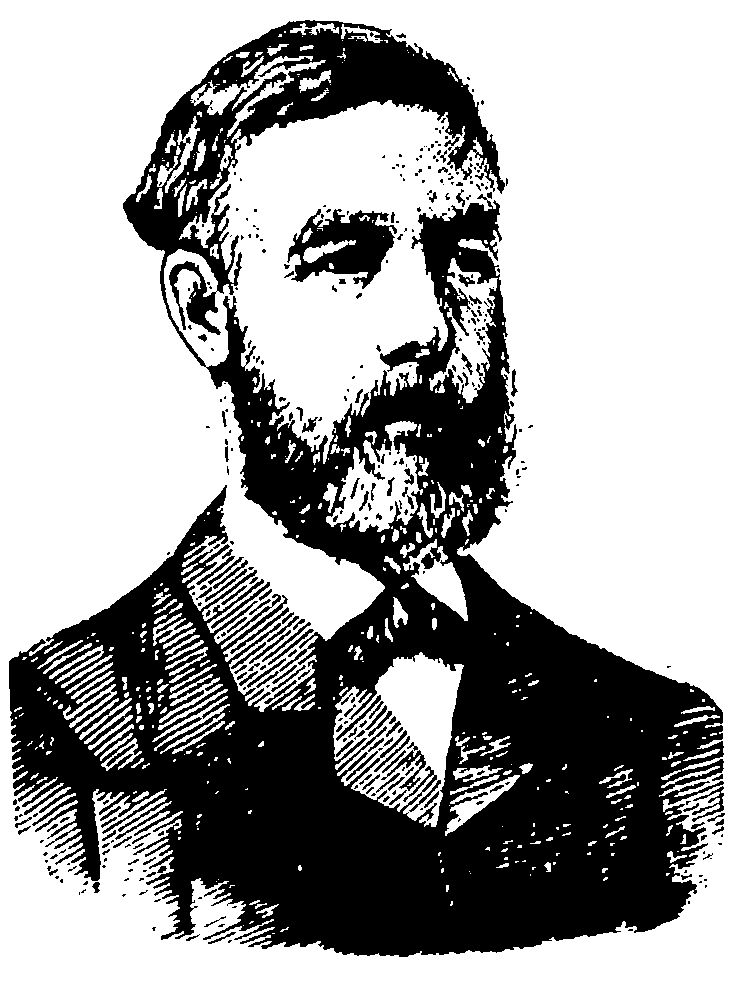
Ole Andreas Bachke.

Ole Andreas Bachke (6 May 1830 – 3 January 1890) was the Norwegian jurist and Government Minister.

He was born at Røros in Søndre Trondhjem county, Norway. Bachke was the eldest son of the local sheriff Halvard Bachke (1800–1852) and his wife AnnaSofie Ditlevsen (1804–1878).

Bachke studied for a career in law and achieved his law degree in Christiania (Oslo) in 1852. He then studied abroad for several years. From 1856 he was a trial attorney in Christiania (now Oslo). In 1860 he became secretary for justice affairs at Christiania. In 1864 he was a judge and became a Chief Justice in 1878.

He was president of a diocesan court, before entering the first cabinet of Prime Minister Frederik Stang in 1879.

He became Minister of Justice 1879–80, member of the Council of State Division in Stockholm 1880–81, Minister of Justice 1880–82, Ministry of Auditing 1882–84, and acting Prime Minister in 1884.
