= Frederik Stang =

Norwegian politician and lawyer (1808–1884)

Frederik Stang MP
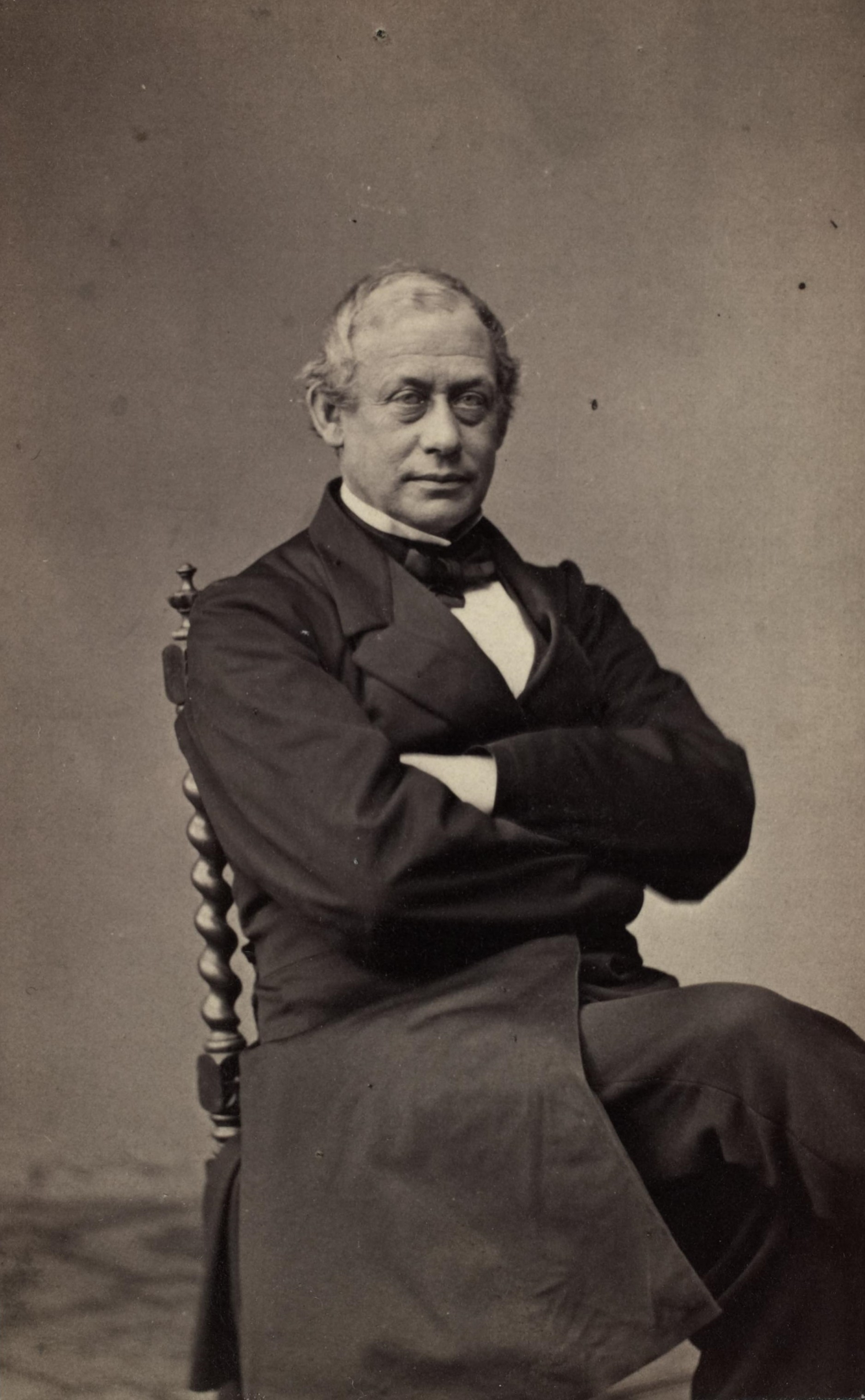

Prime Minister of Norway in Christiania
- In office 21 July 1873 – 4 October 1880
- Monarch: Oscar II
- Preceded by: Himself (as First Minister of Norway)
- Succeeded by: Christian A. Selmer

First Minister of Norway
- In office 1861 – 21 July 1873
- Monarchs: Charles IV; Oscar II
- Preceded by: Hans Christian Petersen
- Succeeded by: Himself (as Prime Minister of Norway)

Personal details
- Born: 4 March 1808 Stokke, Vestfold, Denmark-Norway
- Died: 8 June 1884 (aged 76) Bærum, Akershus, Sweden-Norway
- Children: Emil Stang
- Occupation: Politician
- Profession: Lawyer

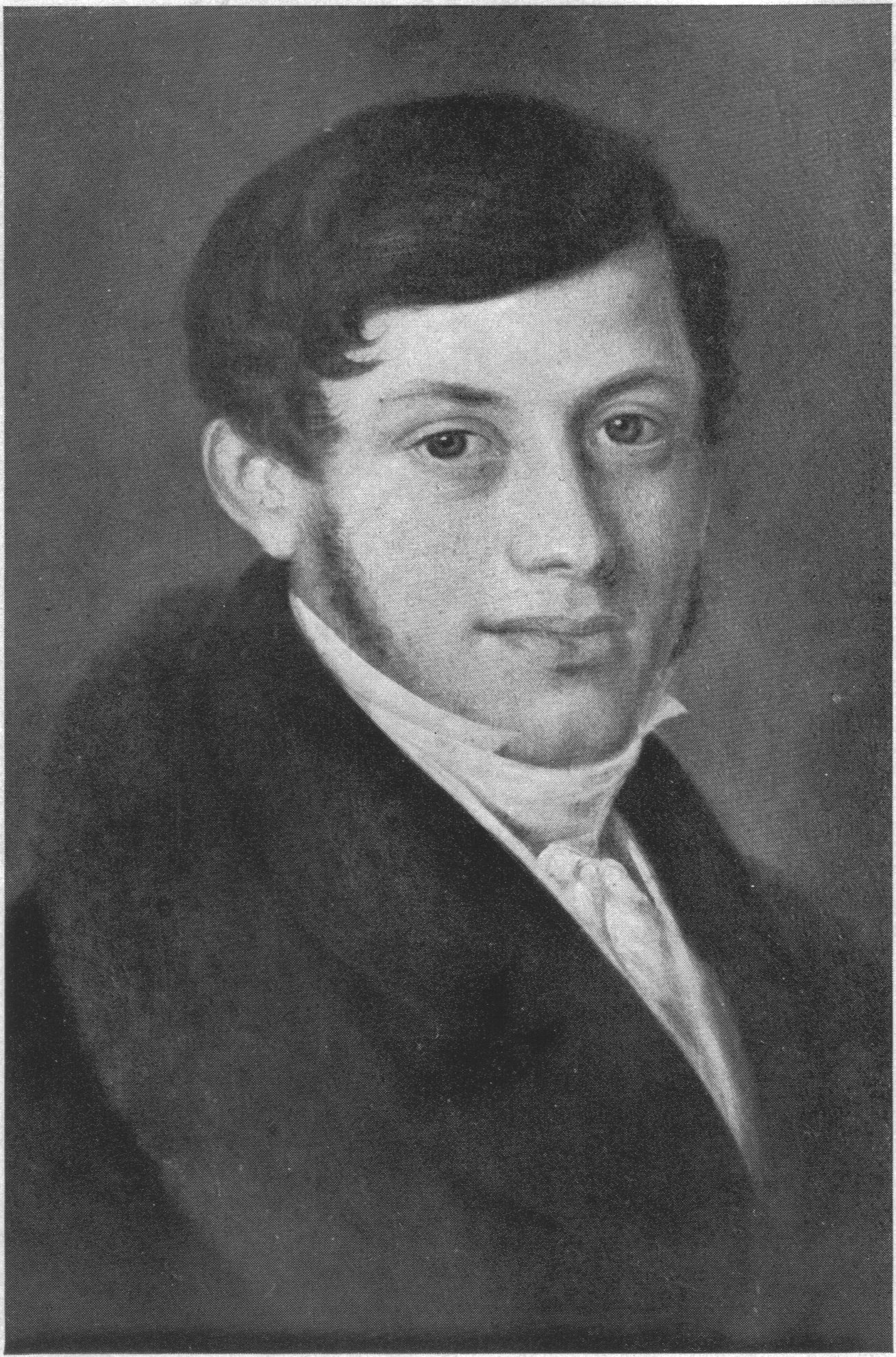
Frederik Stang. portrait by Johan Gørbitz

Frederik Stang (4 March 1808 – 8 June 1884) was a Norwegian lawyer, public servant, and politician who served as Norway's first prime minister in Christiana.

== Law career ==
In 1830, he accepted a position as lecturer of law at the University of Oslo. During this time, he published a seminal text on Norwegian constitutional law. He went over to private practice in 1834, where he distinguished himself as a trial attorney, especially in supreme court cases.

In 1846, Stang became minister of the newly formed Department of the Interior. He served in this position until 1856, and his tenure was characterized by tireless efforts to modernize Norway's economic infrastructure. In addition to improving the road network, harbors, canals, and lighthouses, he was in great measure responsible for Norway and Scandinavia's first railroad, from Oslo to Eidsvoll. He also worked hard to elevate the importance and function of agriculture in Norway, initiating the formation of a university-level school of agriculture, commissioned travelling agrarians, and encouraged better breeding among Norwegian farm animals.

== Political career ==
In 1861, after a brief stint as mayor of Oslo, Stang was appointed to the Norwegian cabinet. His time as a political leader was characterized by considerable discord within the Norwegian parliament and between Norway and the Swedish government. In 1865, Stang founded the Norwegian Red Cross. In 1870, he was elected a member of the Royal Swedish Academy of Sciences.

Until 1873, the king of Sweden and Norway governed Norway through two cabinets: one in Stockholm and another, led by a viceroy in Kristiania, now Oslo. After the viceroy position had been vacant for some time, the post of prime minister for Norway was instituted in 1873, and Stang was appointed. Although there was also a prime minister in Stockholm, the one in Norway had the most influence over state affairs. In spite of efforts to reconcile opposing political forces, his party was reduced to a minority position during his tenure. In a gesture of spite, the parliament cut his pension in half in 1881; the citizens of Oslo raised money to make up for the shortfall, and he donated this to a foundation to advance the study of law.

According to one biography, Stange was an economic liberal, but not an adherent of laissez-faire, believing that Liberalism ‘had to include a moral element and, in combination with a dynamic state power, serve "the welfare, health and education of the people".’

== Early life and family ==
Stang was born on the Nordre Rostad farm at Stokke in Vestfold, Norway. He was the son of Lauritz Leganger Stang (1775–1836) and Johanne Margrethe Conradi (1780–1820). His father was a procurator and later a magistrate. At age 13, he entered the Bergen Cathedral School. Stang, known as Friederich until the 1830s, entered the study of law at the age of 16 and passed the bar exam in 1828.

He was married in 1833 with Augusta Julie Georgine von Munthe af Morgenstierne (1812–1885), the daughter of Magistrate Bredo von Munthe af Morgenstierne (1774–1835) and Cathrine Elisabeth Fries (1781–1840). They were the parents of Emil Stang (1834–1912). Frederik Stang's name is often misspelled as Fredrik Stang, which was the name of his grandson Fredrik Stang (1867–1941) who was a noted jurist. He was also the grandfather of Emil Stang (1882–1964) and Fredrik Stang Lund (1859–1922).

== Honours and awards ==
Frederik Stang became a member of The Royal Norwegian Scientific Society in 1846, the Videnskabs-Selskabet in Christiania at its founding in 1857 and the Royal Swedish Academy of Sciences in Stockholm. He was appointed Commander of the Order of St. Olav at its founding in 1847 and was awarded the Grand Cross in 1853. Four years later, he received the highest award in the country, Bürgerverdienstmedallie in gold. He was a Knight of the Swedish Royal Order of the Seraphim and had the Grand Cross of the Order of the Dannebrog and held other foreign orders.

Political offices
Preceded by Ulrik Anton Motzfeldt	Mayor of Oslo; 1861	Succeeded by Christian Birch-Reichenwald
Preceded by Hans Christian Petersen	Prime Minister of Norway; 1861–1880	Succeeded by Christian August Selmer
