= Motzfeldt =

Motzfeldt is a Scandinavian surname. Notable people with the surname include:

- Angu Motzfeldt, Greenlandic singer
- Benny Motzfeldt (1909–1995), Norwegian artist
- Birger Fredrik Motzfeldt (1898–1987), Norwegian aviator and military officer
- Carl Frederik Motzfeldt (1808–1902), Norwegian politician
- Ernst Motzfeldt (1842–1915), Norwegian politician
- Frederik Motzfeldt (1779–1848), Norwegian politician
- Jonathan Motzfeldt (1938–2010), Greenlandic politician
- Josef Motzfeldt (born 1941), Greenlandic politician
- Ketil Motzfeldt (1814–1889), Norwegian naval officer and politician
- Nukaaka Coster-Waldau née Motzfeldt, Greenlandic singer, actress, and former model
- Peter Motzfeldt (1777–1854), Norwegian military officer and politician
- Ulrik Anton Motzfeldt (1807–1865), Norwegian jurist and politician
- Vivian Motzfeldt, politician

== See also ==
- Motzfeld
- Moitzfeld
