= Diriks =

Diriks is a surname. Notable people with the surname include:

- Carl Frederik Diriks (1814–1895), Norwegian maritime officer, lighthouse director and illustrator
- Christian Adolph Diriks (1775–1837), Norwegian lawyer and politician
- Christian Ludvig Diriks (1802–1873), Norwegian politician
- Edvard Diriks (1855–1930), Norwegian painter

== See also ==
- Kâzım Dirik (1881–1941), Turkish general
