= Erik R. Møinichen =

Norwegian politician

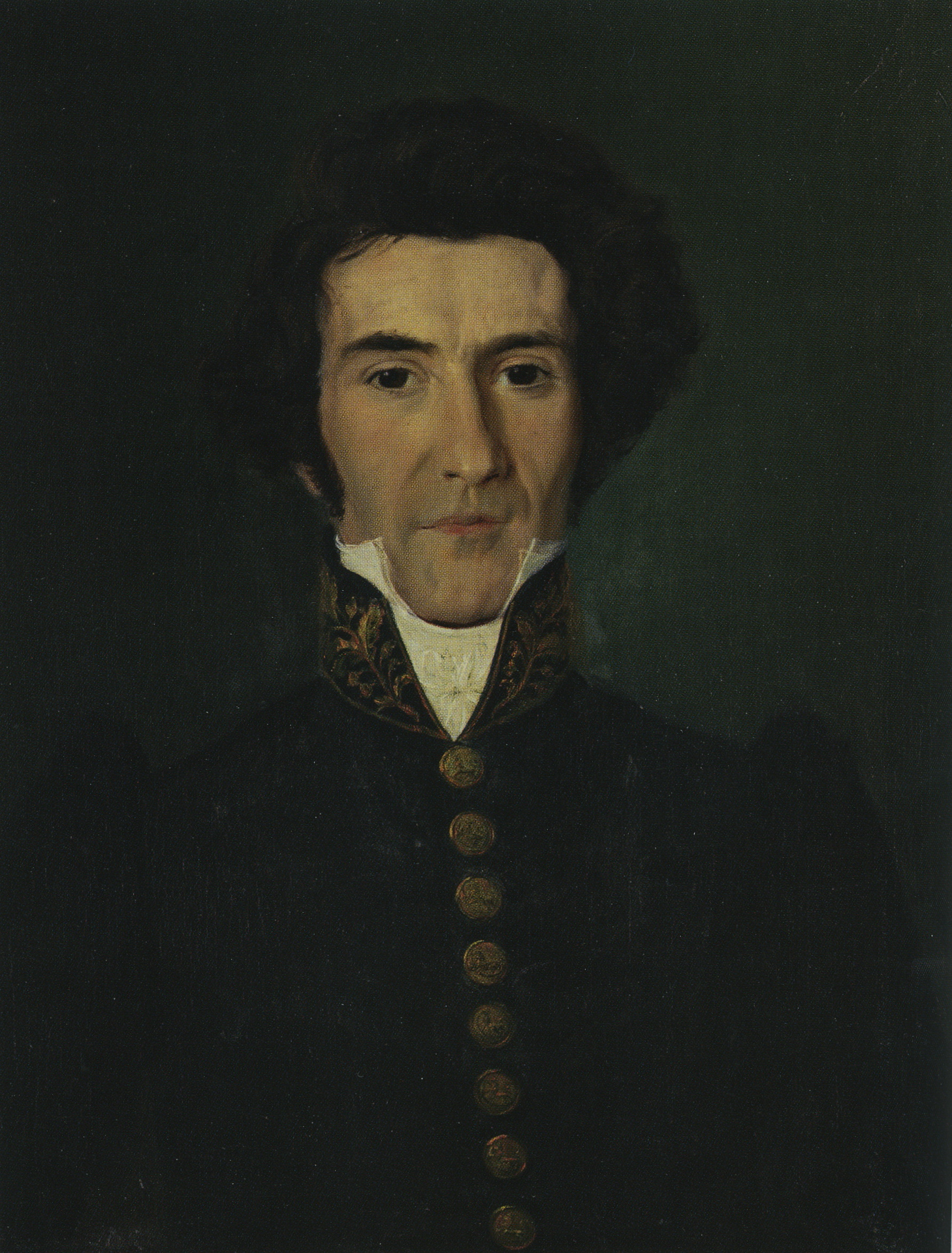
Møinichen in 1832

Erik Røring Møinichen (15 December 1797 – 7 February 1875) was a Norwegian politician.

== Personal life ==
Møinichen was born in Trondhjem as a son of district stipendiary magistrate Thomas Henrich Møinichen (1758–1845) and Ingeborg Birgitte Røring (senior). He was an older brother of Ingeborg Birgitte Møinichen (younger) who married Michael Strøm Lie, and whose children included Erika Nissen.

Erik R. Møinichen married Laura Emilie Sørensen (1812–1888) from Skien.

== Career ==
He held the cand.jur. degree and was hired in the Norwegian Ministry of Justice and the Police in 1827. He is known for his work with the prison service, and was a driving force behind the building of Botsfengselet which was completed in 1851. He was a board member of Norsk Hoved-Jernbane until 1854, when the first railway was opened in Norway.

In politics, Møinichen served as mayor of Christania in 1842 and 1843. He was then the County Governor of Akershus from 1843 to 1855. He was elected to the Parliament of Norway in 1851, representing the constituency of Christiania og Lillehammer, and served one term. From 1855 to 1870 he was a government minister.

He was the Minister of Auditing from January to May 1855, then a member of the Council of State Division in Stockholm. After exactly one year, on 1 June 1856, he became Minister of Finance.

On 1 August 1857 he became Minister of Justice and the Police, where he stayed until 31 August 1858 except for a time between September and November 1857. In August 1858 he also became Minister of Finance, which he was until 30 September 1859. He was then a member of the Council of State Division in Stockholm for thirteen months. Then, from November 1860 to 30 September 1861 he was the Minister of Postal Affairs. He also became Minister of Justice on 12 December 1861 and remained so until the cabinet change on 17 December.

From 1 September 1861 he was the Minister of Finance for twelve months, then a member of the Council of State Division in Stockholm for thirteen months, Minister of the Navy and Postal Affairs for twelve months, member of the Council of State Division in Stockholm for twelve months, Minister of Finance for twelve months, Minister of Justice for twelve months, and member of the Council of State Division in Stockholm for eight months. Then, on 1 June 1868 he became minister of Auditing again. From 1 October 1869 to 31 January 1870 he was Minister of Finance for the fifth time, concluding his involvement in Norwegian government.

Political offices
Preceded by John Iverssøn Randklev	Mayor of Christania; 1842–1843	Succeeded by Carl Andreas Fougstad
Preceded by Fredrik Riis	County Governor of Akershus; 1843–1855	Succeeded by Christian Birch-Reichenwald
Preceded by Nicolai Johan Lohmann Krog	Norwegian Minister of Auditing; January 1855–May 1855	Succeeded by Christian Zetlitz Bretteville
Preceded by Otto Vincent Lange	Norwegian Minister of Finance; 1856–August 1857	Succeeded by Otto Vincent Lange
Preceded by August Christian Manthey	Norwegian Minister of Justice and the Police; August 1857–September 1857	Succeeded by Iver Steen Thomle
Preceded by Jørgen Herman Vogt	Norwegian Minister of Justice and the Police; November 1857–1858	Succeeded by Hans Christian Petersen
Preceded by Otto Vincent Lange	Norwegian Minister of Finance; 1858–1859	Succeeded by Otto Vincent Lange
Preceded by Ketil Motzfeldt	Norwegian Minister of Postal Affairs; 1860–September 1861 (Christian Ludvig Diriks acting in August 1861)	Succeeded by position abolished
Preceded by Otto Vincent Lange	Norwegian Minister of Finance; September 1861–1862	Succeeded by Otto Vincent Lange
Preceded by Christian Birch-Reichenwald	Norwegian Minister of Justice and the Police; December 1861–December 1861	Succeeded by Hans Gerhard Colbjørnsen Meldahl
Preceded by Wolfgang Wenzel Haffner	Norwegian Minister of the Navy and Postal Affairs; September 1863–1864	Succeeded by Wolfgang Wenzel Haffner
Preceded by Henrik Laurentius Helliesen	Norwegian Minister of Finance; 1865–1866	Succeeded by Henrik Laurentius Helliesen
Preceded by Hans Gerhard Colbjørnsen Meldahl	Norwegian Minister of Justice and the Police; 1866–1867	Succeeded by Hans Gerhard Colbjørnsen Meldahl
Preceded by Frederik Stang	Norwegian Minister of Auditing; 1868–1869	Succeeded by Frederik Stang
Preceded by Henrik Laurentius Helliesen	Norwegian Minister of Finance; 1869–1870	Succeeded by August Christian Manthey
