= Johan Fjeldsted Dahl =

Norwegian bookseller and publisher

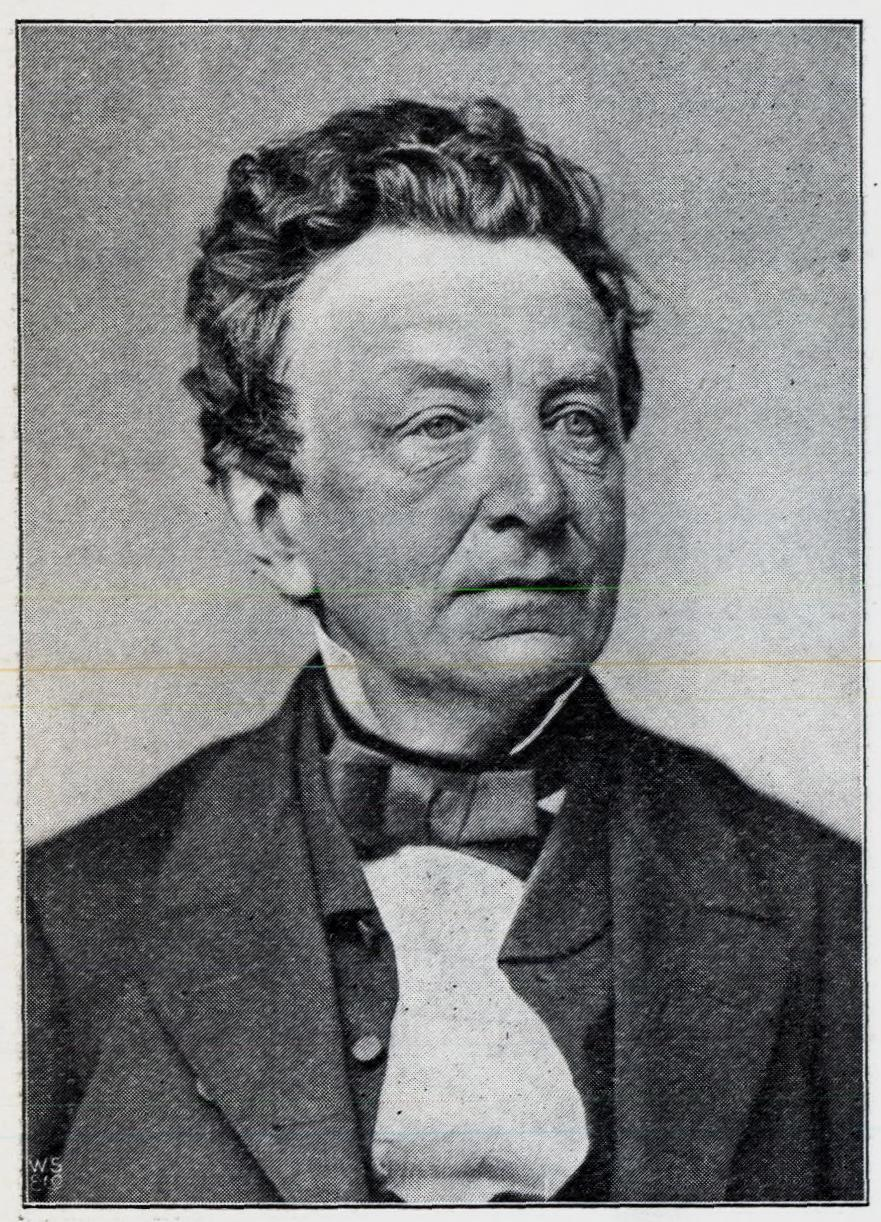
- Born: 1 January 1807; Copenhagen, Denmark
- Died: 16 March 1877 (aged 70)
- Occupations: bookseller and publisher

Johan Anthon Abraham Fjeldsted Dahl (1 January 1807 – 16 March 1877) was a Norwegian bookseller and publisher. He was a patron of the arts and was co-founder of Oslo Kunstforening.

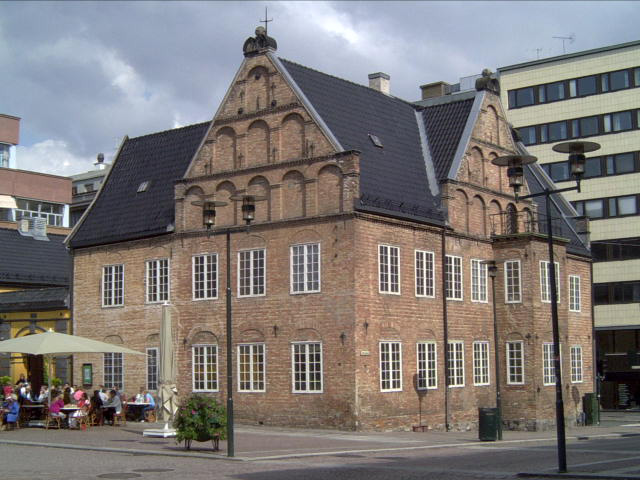
Oslo Kunstforening

== Personal life ==
Dahl was born in Copenhagen as the son of shoemaker John Dahl and Anne Kirstine Willumsen. He was married to singer and music teacher Emma Amalie Charlotte Freyse (1819–1896).

== Career ==
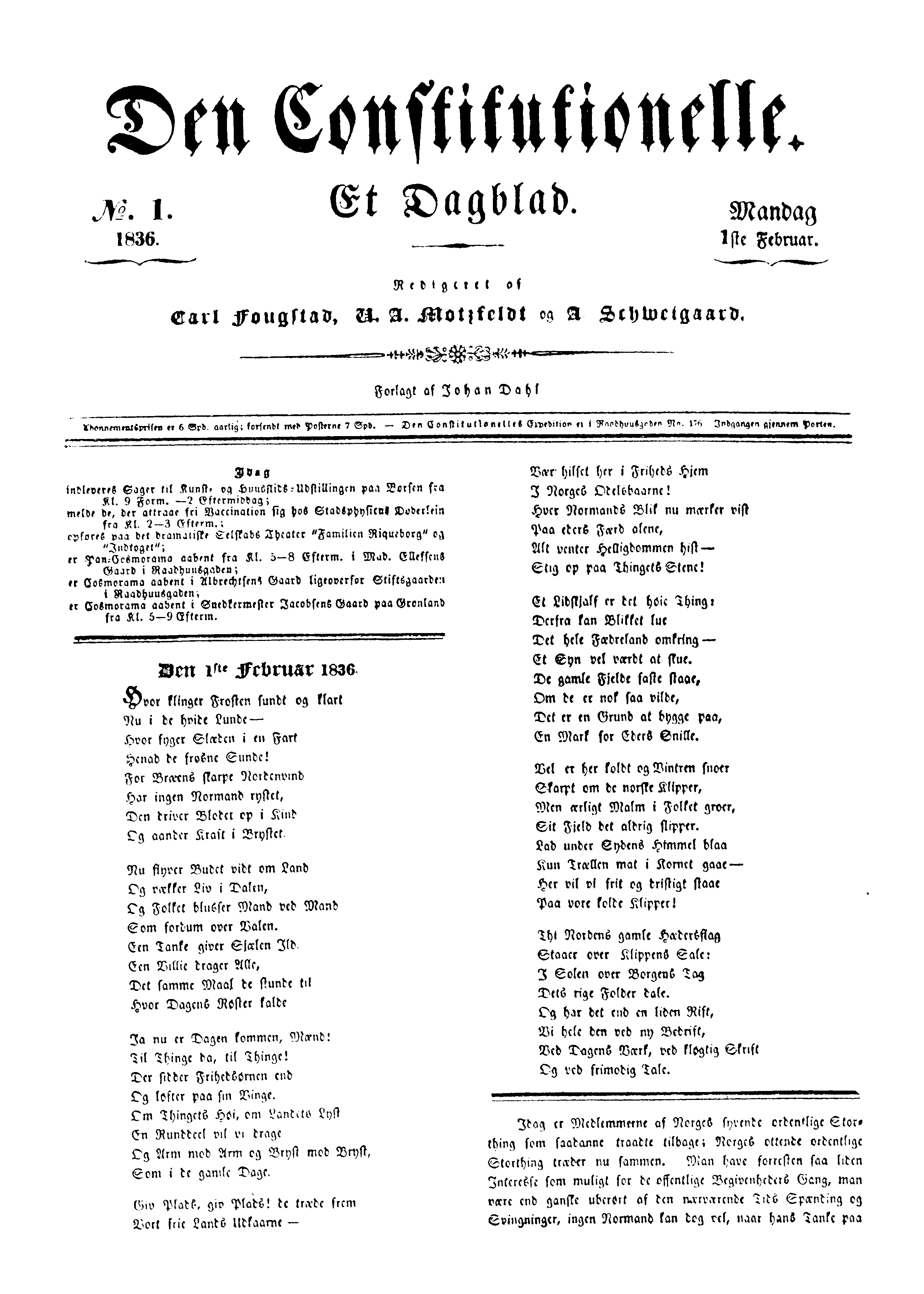
Den Constitutionelle, its first edition from 1 February 1836

Dahl started working for Gyldendalske Boghandel in Copenhagen from he was 15 years old. In 1829 he moved to Christiania (now Oslo) Norway to help with Jørgen Wright Cappelen's new bookstore. In 1832 he established his own bookstore in Christiania, which came to be an important meeting place for the literary and cultural elite in the 1830s and 1840s. He also established a publishing house. Among his published books were Amtmandens Døttre by Camilla Collett, Synnøve Solbakken by Bjørnstjerne Bjørnson, and Kongs-Emnerne by Henrik Ibsen.

A controversy occurred in 1836, when Dahl published Andreas Munch's poetry collection Ephemerer. The police demanded that the book should be censored before its publication, while Dahl, in opposition to censorship, refused. The case eventually ended in a victory for Dahl in the Supreme Court.

Dahl founded the newspaper Den Constitutionelle in 1836, with assistance from Ulrik Anton Motzfeldt and Carl Andreas Fougstad. He was a co-founder of the art gallery and art society Christiania Kunstforening (now Oslo Kunstforening) in 1836, along with Johan Sebastian Welhaven, Frederik Stang and Henrik Heftye.

Dahl is immortalized through Henrik Wergeland's farce Papegøien (The Parrot) from 1835, where his course of life forms the basis for a wild parody. When Dahl learned about the farce, he offered to publish the book, something Wergeland found amusing and agreed to. But as a revenge Dahl put a label on the title page of the book, without Wergeland's knowledge, where it said that the complete profit was to be donated to charity.
