= Jens Landmark =

Norwegian politician (1811–1880)

- Born: 17 December 1811
- Died: 9 July 1880 (aged 68)
- Known for: Norwegian military officer and politician

Jens Landmark (17 December 1811 – 9 July 1880) was a Norwegian military officer and politician. He reached the rank of lieutenant colonel, was the director of Kongsberg Weapons Factory from 1854 to 1880, invented the Landmark conversion and served both as mayor as well as three periods in the Norwegian Parliament.

== Personal life ==
He was born in Ulfsten to Andreas Landmark and Jacobine Caroline Wind. His uncle was Nils Landmark, and he had several notable cousins, including Johan Theodor and Johan Widing Heiberg Landmark.

He married Richarda Mathea Petrie Bruenech (1813–1854), who hailed from Kongsberg.

== Career ==
Jens Landmark first made a career in the Norwegian Army. He rose in the hierarchy, from cadet in 1827 to second lieutenant in 1831. He later became captain. However, from 1838 he had a parallel career at the weapons factory Kongsberg Vaabenfabrik, a forerunner of Kongsberg Defence & Aerospace. Originally going into apprenticeship as a surveyor, he got this job on a permanent basis in October 1840. On 1 November 1854 he became acting director, and was appointed director permanently on 26 May 1855. He succeeded Peder Christian Holst. Landmark personally constructed the Landmark conversion, a modification of the kammerlader rifles to allow them to fire rim fire ammunition, as opposed to being caplock weapons. The model was used by the Royal Norwegian Navy. During Landmark's time as director, the factory saw some significant progresses. In 1871 the branch line of the Randsfjord Railway Line from Hokksund to Kongsberg was completed, making transportation much easier. Also, new production demands, as the Remington (1867) and Krag–Petersson (1876) rifles were taken into use, led to expansions.

In 1862 Landmark was elected to the Norwegian Parliament, representing the constituency of Kongsberg. He was re-elected on two non-consecutive occasions, in 1868 and 1880. Both his father and uncle had been members of Parliament. On the local political level, Jens Landmark was mayor of Kongsberg in 1851 (Sjur Aasmundsen Sexe was mayor from January to March), 1853, 1856 and 1864, and deputy mayor in 1855 and 1861.

In addition, he was still enrolled with the military, and was promoted to lieutenant colonel on 30 January 1864. In addition, he was proclaimed Knight of the Order of St. Olav in 1860, as well as Knight of the Swedish Order of the Sword.

Jens Landmark died in 1880 in Kongsberg. He was succeeded as factory director by Ole Herman Krag. A street in Kongsberg was named for him.
