= Hans Nicolai Lange =

Norwegian politician

Hans Nicolai Lange (2 December 1795 – 24 December 1848) was a Norwegian priest and politician.

== Biography ==
He was born at Jevnaker in Oppland, Norway. He was the son of Johan Jørgen Lange (1754-1814) and Dorothea Helena Larsen (1771-1824). He father was a parish priest. Lange had five siblings. He was the elder brother of politicians Otto Vincent Lange and Ulrik Frederik Lange, brother-in-law of Nils Landmark and Even Hanssen and uncle of Johan Jørgen Lange Hanssen.

In 1825 he married Anna Rebekka Blix (1799-1874). They had no children.

He was the first teacher at the Bragernes borgerskole in Drammen, working there from 1825–1846. He was elected to the Norwegian Parliament in 1839. He later became vicar in Bragernes parish. Lange was appointed Mayor of Drammen for two terms; first 1838–1839, then 1842–1848.

Due to bad health, he traveled to Paris to regain it, but died there on Christmas Eve 1848.
