= Ministry of Postal Affairs (Norway) =

Former government ministry of Norway

The Norwegian Ministry of Postal Affairs (Norwegian: Postdepartementet) was a Norwegian ministry that existed from 1860 to 1861. It was responsible for postal affairs.

It was established on 18 August 1860 as a successor of the General Post Directorate, which had been separated from the Ministry of the Interior as a government agency in 1857. It ceased to exist already on 1 October 1861, when it was merged with the Ministry of the Navy to form the Norwegian Ministry of the Navy and Postal Affairs.

The heads of the Ministry of Postal Affairs were Ketil Motzfeldt (1860), Erik Røring Møinichen (1860-1861), Christian Ludvig Diriks (temporary, 1861) and Erik Røring Møinichen again (1861).

A short-lived Ministry of Postal Affairs existed for some months in 1885. It was headed by Birger Kildal.

== List of ministers ==
=== Key ===
Independent
Liberal Party

=== Ministers ===
Photo	Name	Party	Took office	Left office	Tenure	Cabinet
	Ketil Motzfeldt	Independent	18 August 1860	31 October 1860	74 days	Sibbern/Birch/Motzfeldt
	Erik Røring Møinichen	Independent	1 November 1860	12 August 1861	284 days	Sibbern/Birch/Motzfeldt
	Christian Ludvig Diriks	Independent	12 August 1861	24 August 1861	12 days	Sibbern/Birch/Motzfeldt
	Erik Røring Møinichen	Independent	24 August 1861	30 September 1861	37 days	Sibbern/Birch/Motzfeldt
	Birger Kildal	Liberal	1 May 1885	31 December 1885	244 days	Sverdrup
