= Nils Landmark =

Norwegian politician

Nils L. Landmark
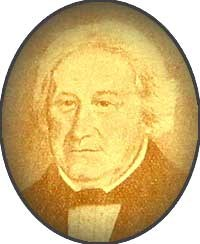
- Born: 11 March 1775; Christiania, Norway
- Died: 29 October 1859 (aged 84); Fjaler, Norway
- Occupations: Jurist, farmer, politician

Nils L. Landmark (11 March 1775 – 29 October 1859) was a Norwegian jurist, farmer and politician.

== Personal life ==
He was born in Christiania to Nils Svensson and Karen Andersdatter Killerud. Contrary to some sources, he was not born with the name Landmark, but took the name as a grown-up. He had lost his father at the age of seven, and was raised by district stipendiary magistrate (sorenskriver) Jens Stub. Stub would later be a founding father of the Norwegian Constitution in 1814.

In 1801 he married Barbra Henriette Rantzau Heiberg. She died in 1828. In December 1835 Nils Landmark took his second wife Christiane Wilhelmine Lange. She was a sister of politicians Hans Nicolai, Otto Vincent and Ulrik Frederik Lange, sister-in-law of Even Hanssen and aunt of Johan Jørgen Lange Hanssen.

In total, Nils Landmark was the father of fifteen children. One of his sons from the first marriage, Johan Widing Heiberg Landmark, became a jurist and politician. Others became physicians or priests, and several of the grandchildren became authors. From the second marriage he had the sons Johan Theodor, agrarian leader, and Even Anton Thomas, jurist and zoologist.

In addition, he was the younger brother of Andreas Landmark and uncle of Jens Landmark.

== Career ==
Landmark first earned his living by helping out at the magistrate office of Jens Stub. With Stub's help, Nils Landmark moved to Copenhagen to study. He graduated as cand.jur. in 1797, and was hired as an attorney at the magistrate office. In 1808 Landmark was promoted to district stipendiary magistrate of Sunnfjord. He settled at the farm Tysse in Ytre Holmedal in 1809 (present-day Fjaler Municipality).

Under Landmark's household, the farm Tysse was expanded and improved into a so-called model farm. He was one of the first people in the district to commence organized forest planting; especially fraxinus excelsior, ulmus glabra, salix og acer platanoides. Besides this he specialized in fruit trees. He founded the organization Det Holmedalske Sogneselskab, one of the earlier agricultural organizations in the district, and served as chairman for many years.

In 1821 he was elected to the Norwegian Parliament, representing the constituency of Nordre Bergenhus Amt. His older brother Andreas Landmark, who was a bailiff in Romsdals Amt, served during the same period.

Nils Landmark retired from the position as district stipendiary magistrate in 1852. He died in 1859 in Ytre Holmedal Municipality.
