= Johan Widing Heiberg Landmark =

Norwegian politician

Johan Widing Heiberg Landmark (12 April 1802 – 16 November 1878) was a Norwegian jurist and politician.

== Personal life ==
He was born in the prestegjeld of Gloppen in Nordfjord. His parents were Nils Landmark and Barbra Henriette Rantzau Heiberg. His uncle Andreas Landmark was notable as a politician, and his grandfather had migrated to Norway from Sweden.

In 1824 he married Dorthea Margrethe Finde Heiberg, his mother's niece.

== Career ==
Like his father, he studied law, graduating as cand.jur. in 1826. In 1833 he was hired as an attorney in Fjaler, where his father was seated as the district stipendiary magistrate (sorenskriver) of Sunnfjord. Johan was given the property Fagervik, previously a part of his father's farm Tysse. He lived at Fagervik from 1833 to 1846. In 1847 he was appointed bailiff (fut) in Sogn, and moved to Balestrand Municipality.

Johan Widing Heiberg Landmark had a political career. When local governance was introduced in 1837, he became the first mayor of Ytre Holmedal Municipality. In 1845 he served as a deputy representative to the Norwegian Parliament.

He died in Balestrand.
