= Lars Rasch =

Norwegian jurist

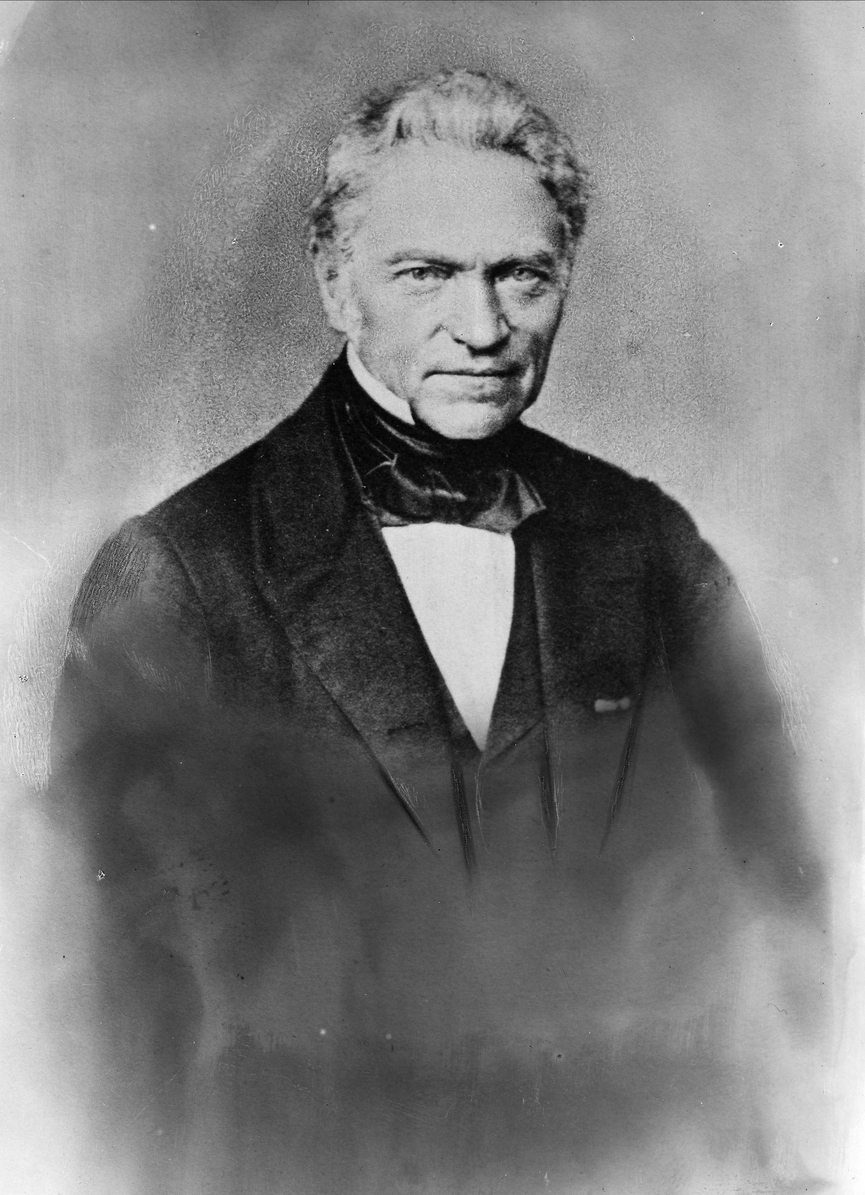
Lars Rasch (1797–1864)

Lars Rasch (24 May 1797 – 12 January 1864) was a Norwegian jurist. He served as Mayor of Oslo and was a developer of the neighborhood of Homansbyen.

== Biography ==
Rasch was born at Eiker in Buskerud, Norway. He was the son of Jonas Larsen Rasch and Kirsti Jacobsdatter Ihle. He finished secondary education in 1818, and graduated as cand.jur. in 1822. He then worked as an attorney. He was the Deputy Chief of the Byfogden in Christiania (now Oslo) before becoming a prosecutor in 1824. From 1831 he was in private practice as a lawyer and served as a real estate agent.

Rasch was mayor of Christiania in 1845 and from 1847 to 1852. In 1854, Rasch together with brothers Jacob Homan (1816–1869) and Henrik Homan (1824-1900) acquired property in Frogner which was developed into the neighborhood of Homansbyen.

Rasch was instrumental in the establishment of Christiania Dampkjøkken. The facility was designed by architect Georg Andreas Bull and was opened December 21, 1858. Rasch served as a board member together with co-founders police chief Christian Fredrik Jacob von Munthe af Morgenstierne (1806-1888) and city council member Thor Olsen (1786-1868).

He was proclaimed Knight of the Order of St. Olav in 1853.

== Other sources ==
- Tvedt, Knut Are, ed. (2000) Ordførere i Christiania/Kristiania/Oslo (Oslo: Kunnskapsforlaget) ISBN 82-573-0815-3

| Preceded by Carl Andreas Fougstad | Mayor of Christania; 1845 | Succeeded by Christian Birch-Reichenwald |
| Preceded by Christian Birch-Reichenwald | Mayor of Christania; 1847–1852 | Succeeded by Ulrik Anton Motzfeldt |
