= Christian Birch-Reichenwald =

Norwegian jurist and politician

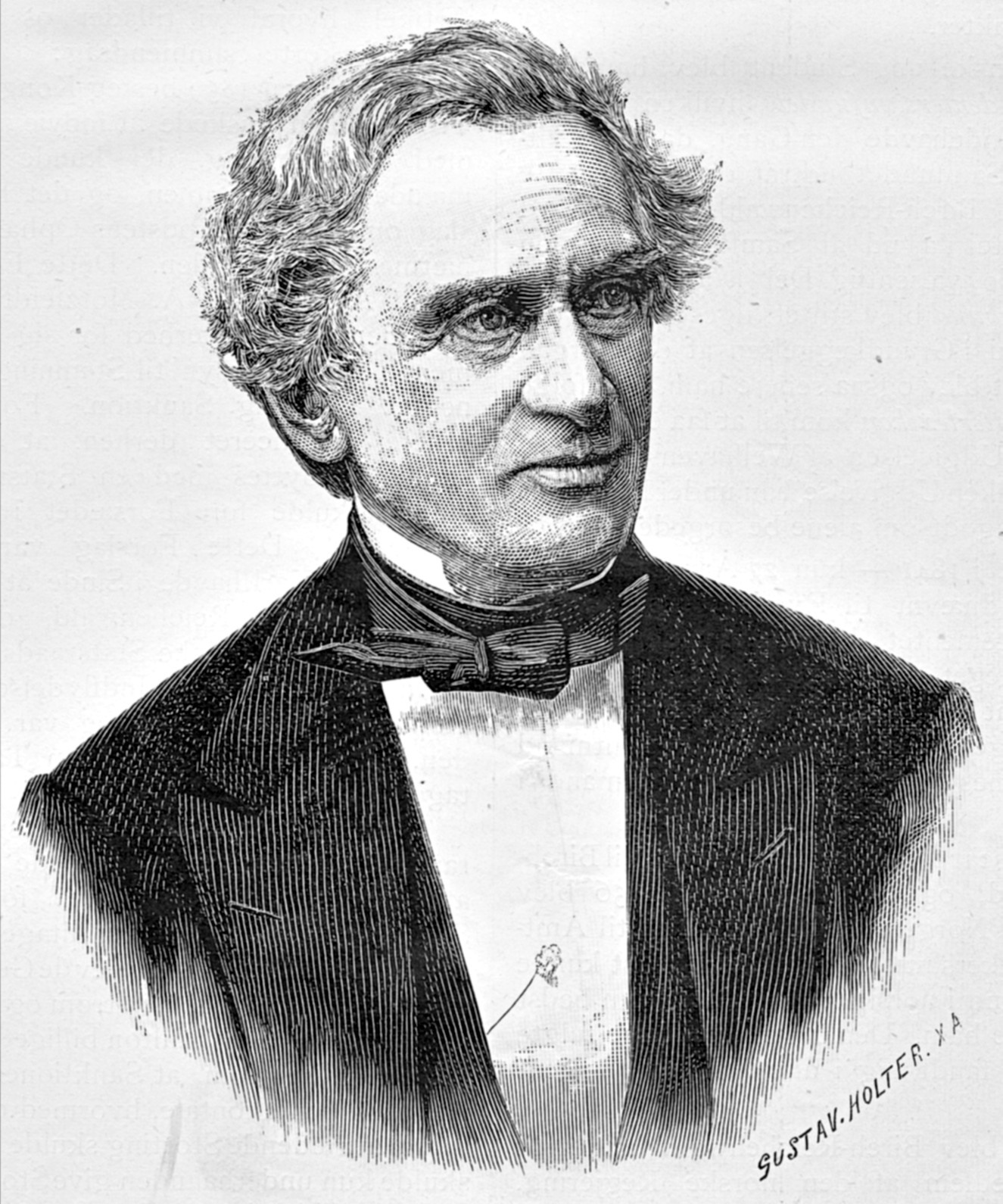
Christian Birch-Reichenwald

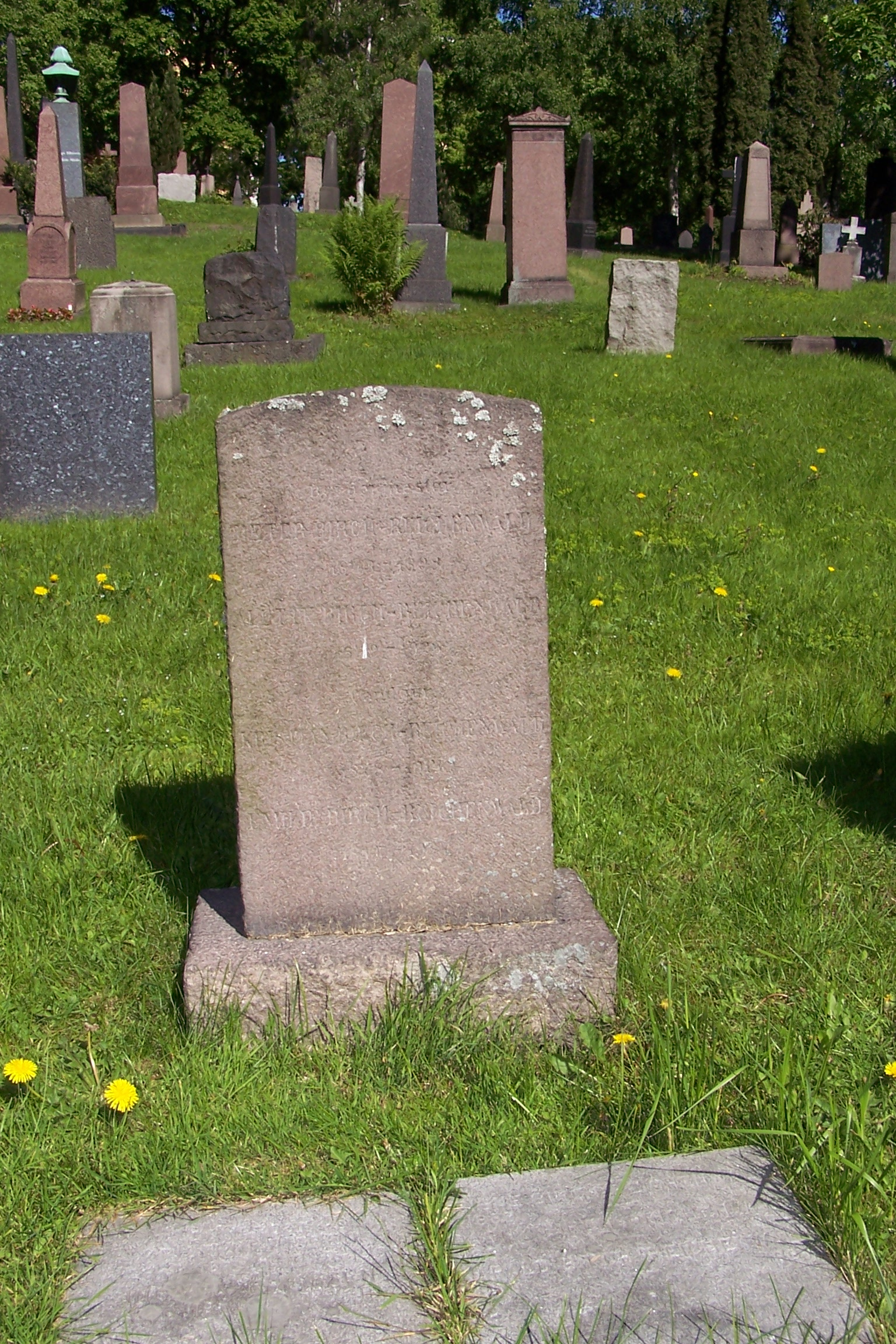
Birch-Reichenwald's headstone at the Vår Frelsers gravlund

Christian Birch-Reichenwald (4 January 1814 – 8 July 1891) was a Norwegian jurist and politician who served as mayor of Oslo, Norway.

He was born at Blaker in Akershus, Norway. He was the son of to Paul Hansen Birch and Anna Catharina Hoffmand Stenersen. He married Jacobine Ida Sophie Motzfeldt, daughter of Peter Motzfeldt and niece of his own mother. The couple had two children; Anna Ernesta (born 1839) and Peter (born 1843).

He studied at the University of Christiania (now University of Oslo), completing his law degree in 1834. During his university studies, he had been chairman in the Norwegian Students' Society. He was a member of the social circle Intelligenspartiet, and befriended such notable figures as Anton Martin Schweigaard, Bernhard Dunker and Johan Sebastian Welhaven there.

He served as mayor of Christiania (now Oslo) in 1846. In 1847 he was appointed County Governor of Smaalenene (today named Østfold). While stationed here he was elected to the Norwegian Parliament in 1848 and 1854, representing the constituency of Moss og Drøbak. In 1855 he was appointed County Governor in the more central county of Akershus.

In 1858 he was appointed Minister of Auditing. The road had been opened for Christian Birch-Reichenwald and his supporters, as Crown Prince Carl of Sweden and Norway, who was viceroy of Norway at that time, had requested first minister and head of government Jørgen Herman Vogt to "tender his resignation". According to historians, Birch-Reichenwald and his friend Georg Christian Sibbern "used" Crown Prince Carl to their own gains.

Birch-Reichenwald was Minister of Auditing for one year, then became a member of the Council of State Division in Stockholm from 1859 to 1860, and then served as Minister of Justice and the Police from 1860 to 1861. In 1861, the governor-general position was discussed. Carl, who in the meantime had been crowned King, was unwilling to abolish this position, provoking Christian Birch-Reichenwald (and Ketil Motzfeldt) to resign. The governor-general office was not abolished until 1873.

In 1862 Birch-Reichenwald was elected mayor of Christiania for the second time, serving through that year. He was also elected to a third parliamentary term, representing the constituency of Christiania, Hønefoss og Kongsvinger. From 1864 to 1865 he was mayor of Christiania for the third time, and in 1865 he was again elected to parliament. From 1869 to 1889 he served as district stipendiary magistrate (sorenskriver). He died in 1891 and was buried at Vår Frelsers gravlund.

Political offices
| Preceded by Lars Rasch | Mayor of Christania; 1846 | Succeeded by Lars Rasch |
| Preceded by Gregers Winther Wulfsberg | County Governor of Østfold; 1847–1855 | Succeeded by Carl Sibbern |
| Preceded by Erik Røring Møinichen | County Governor of Akershus; 1855–1858 | Succeeded by Johan Christian Collett |
| Preceded by August Christian Manthey | Minister of Auditing; 1858–1859 | Succeeded by Hans Christian Petersen |
| Preceded by Erik Røring Møinichen | Minister of Justice and the Police; 1860–1861 | Succeeded by Erik Røring Møinichen |
| Preceded by Frederik Stang | Mayor of Christiania; 1862 | Succeeded by August Thomle |
| Preceded by August Thomle | Mayor of Christiania; 1864–1865 | Succeeded by Carl Johan Michelet |
