= Carl Andreas Fougstad =

Norwegian attorney, journalist, author and elected official

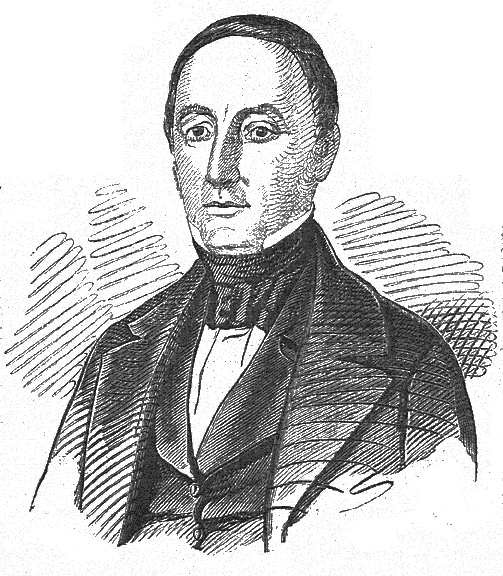
Carl Andreas Fougstad.

Carl Andreas Fougstad (2 March 1806 – 3 July 1871) was a Norwegian attorney, journalist, author and elected official. He served as mayor of Oslo.

== Biography ==
Fougstad was born and grew up in Alverstraumen (in the present-day Alver Municipality in Vestland county, Norway). He was the son of Johannes Fougstad (1755–1830) and Charlotte Eleonore Tidemand Arentz (1767–1830). He studied law at the University of Christiania (now University of Oslo) and graduated as cand.jur. in 1831. In 1828 he had been chairman in the Det Norske Studentersamfund for half a year.

He was a member of the social circle Intelligenspartiet, whose most famous members were Anton Martin Schweigaard, Frederik Stang and Johan Sebastian Welhaven. Fougstad was a co-editor of their newspaper Den Constitutionelle from 1836 to 1837. He authored the publications Det norske Storthing i 1833, Repertorium for Oplysninger og Undersøgelser vedkommende viktige Gjenstande for ottende ordentlige Storthings Virksomhed with three volumes in 1835 and 1836 (with Frederik Stang) and Det norske Storthing i 1836.

Most of the members of Intelligenspartiet held some public office (embete); Fougstad worked as a civil servant in the Ministry of Finance from 1831 to 1845. From 1838 to 1845 he was co-author of the Department's Official Journal. From 1845 to 1850 he worked as chief of police in Christiania (now Oslo).

He was a member of Christiania city council from 1842 to 1850, serving as mayor from 1843 to 1845. Fougstad was elected to the Norwegian Parliament in 1848, representing the constituency Christiania og Lillehammer. From 1850 to 1868 he served as burgomaster of Christiania. He was proclaimed Knight of the Order of St. Olav in 1855. He was also held the Russian Order of St. Anna, 2nd class, and was a commander of the Swedish Order of the Polar Star. In 1901, Fougstads gate in the district of St. Hanshaugen in Oslo was named in his honor.

Preceded by Erik Røring Møinichen	Mayor of Christania; 1843–1845	Succeeded by Lars Rasch
