= Paul Hansen Birch =

Norwegian politician (1788–1863)

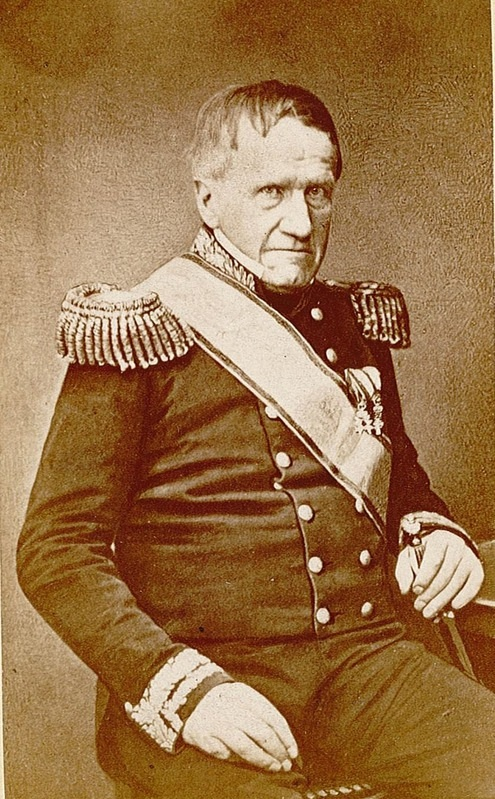
Paul Hansen Birch

Paul Hansen Birch (20 July 1788 – 25 April 1863) was a Norwegian Major General in the Norwegian Army.

He was born in Fåberg in Christians amt (county), Norway to Johan Gottfried Reichenwald and Mari Birch. He was adopted by his uncle General War Commissioner Hans Jorgen Birch. He married Anna Catharina Hoffmand Stenersen (1791–1840), daughter of Bent Christian Stenersen and his wife Margrete Birgitte, née Aarøe. They had two sons. The oldest son Christian Birch-Reichenwald became a notable politician. He married Jacobine Ida Sophie Motzfeldt, niece of Paul Hansen Birch's wife, and their son Peter Birch-Reichenwald became a notable politician.

Birch entered began at the military academy in Christiania (now Oslo) in 1800. Birch served as guard commander for the Norwegian Constituent Assembly at Eidsvoll Manor in 1814. Birch accompanied King Charles III John to his coronation in Trondheim in 1818. He became a Colonel in 1820 and in 1821 Adjutant General. He reaching the rank of General and aide-de-camp for King Charles III John in 1821. He was an acting member of the Council of State Division in Stockholm from July to October 1822. He was General War Commissioner and head of the Trondheim Infantry Brigade from 1823 to 1831.
