= Johan Jørgen Lange Hanssen =

Norwegian politician (1821–1889)

Johan Jørgen Lange Hanssen (18 November 1821 - 23 December 1889) was a Norwegian politician.

== Personal life ==
He was born in 1821 in Christiania as the son of jurist and politician Even Hanssen and his wife Barbara Abigael Lange. He had a younger brother Peter Nicolai Freberg Hansen who became a jurist like his father.

In December 1853 he married Lovise Jacobine Lange. She hailed from Arendal, and was the daughter of government minister Otto Vincent Lange and Anne Nicoline Aall. Anne Nicoline Aall was the daughter of Jacob Aall and niece of Jørgen and Niels Aall. All these people were influential politicians. Furthermore, Otto Vincent Lange was a maternal uncle of Johan Jørgen Lange Hanssen, and as such Johan Jørgen was married to his first cousin. Additionally, the maternal uncles Hans Nicolai and Ulrik Frederik were involved in politics; so was priest Nils Landmark who was married to a Johan Jørgen's maternal aunt Christiane Wilhelmine.

== Career ==
Johan Jørgen Lange Hanssen moved to Arendal and became director of an insurance company, as well as of the local savings bank.

He was elected to the Norwegian Parliament in 1874, representing the urban constituency of Arendal og Grimstad. He served only one term.

In the 1865 census his household were registered as having at least three servants.
