= Homansbyen =

Neighborhood in Oslo, Norway

Coordinates: 59°55′17.15″N 10°43′29.29″E

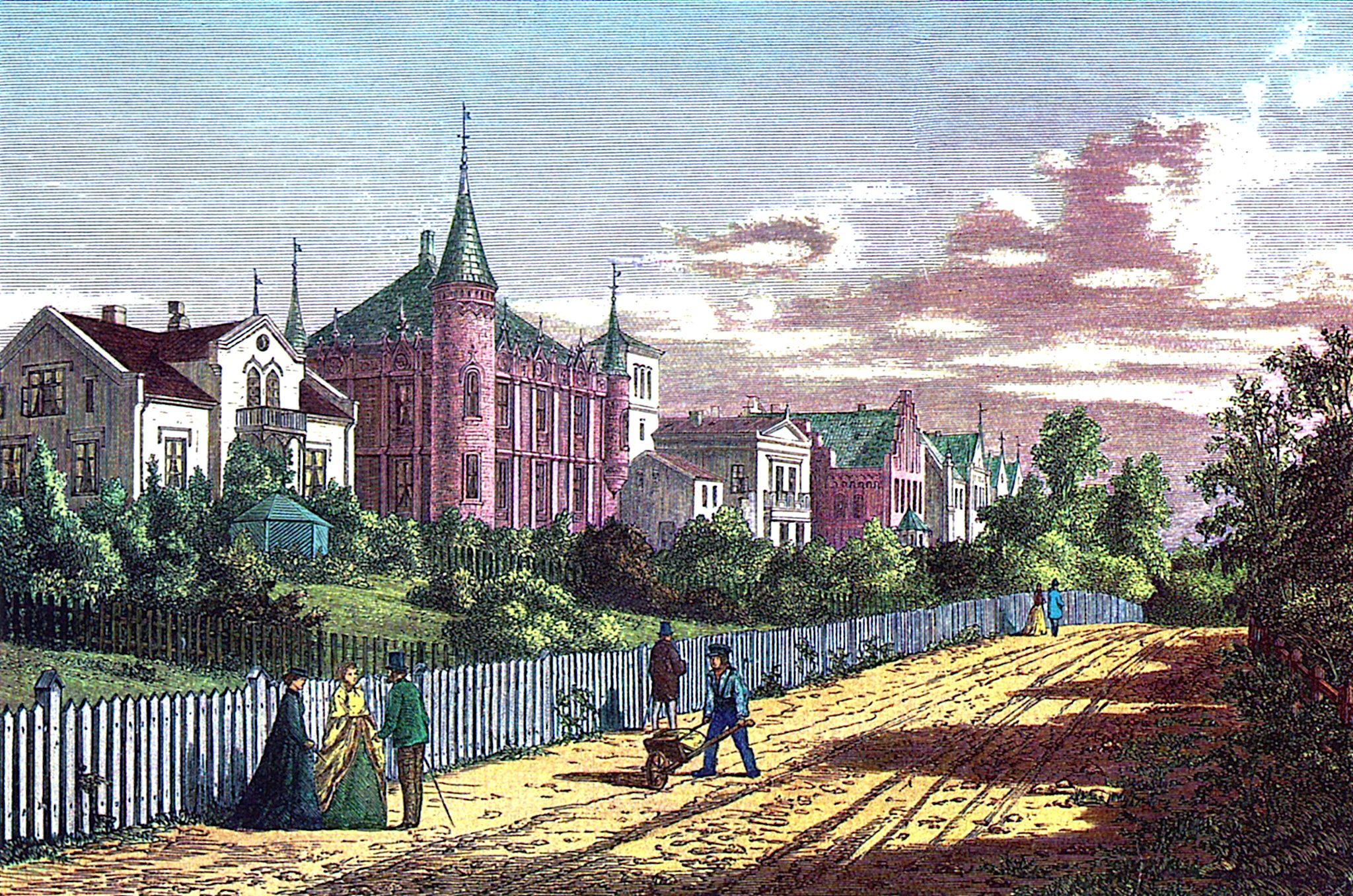
Drawing of Josefinesgate

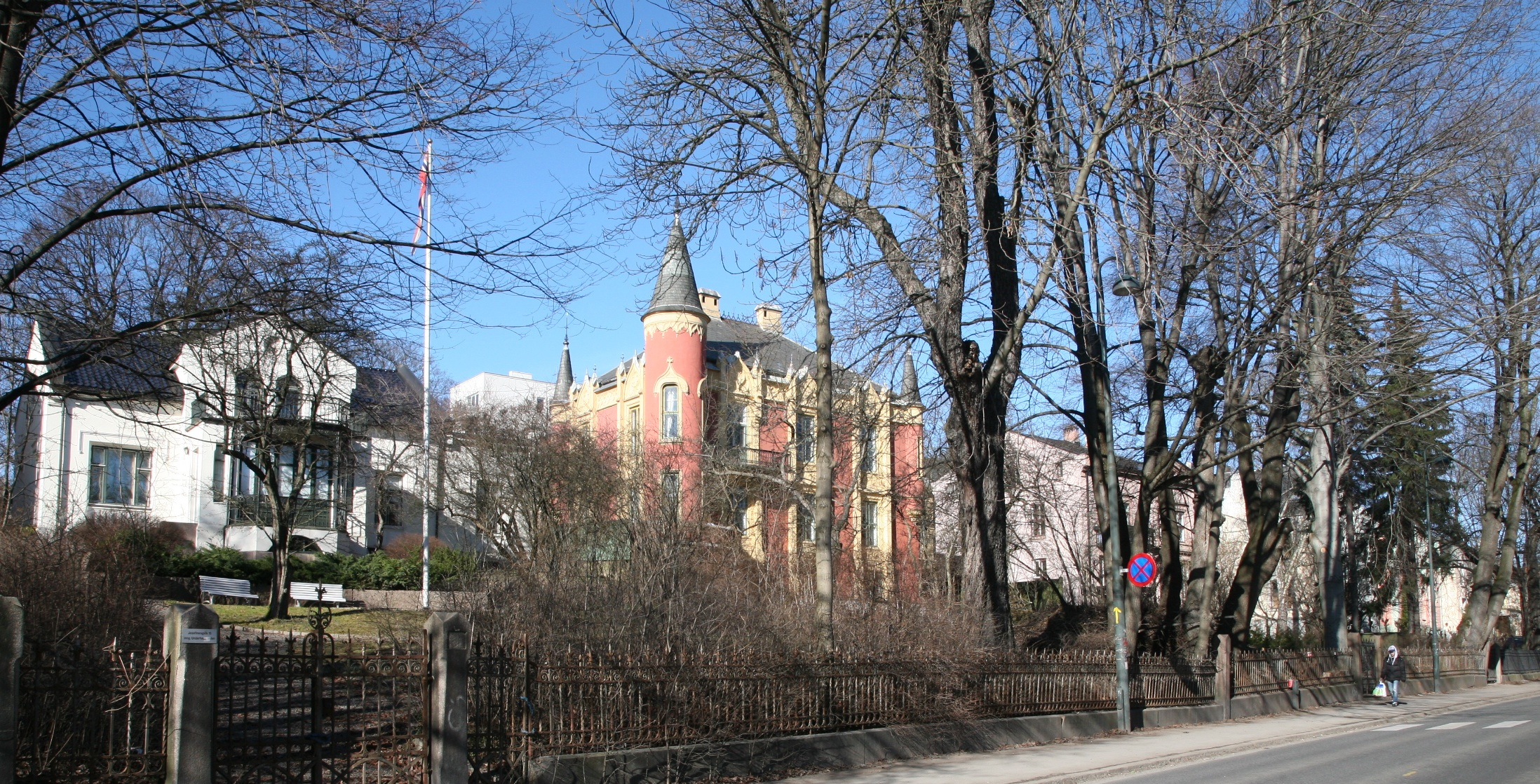
Homansbyen in March 2007

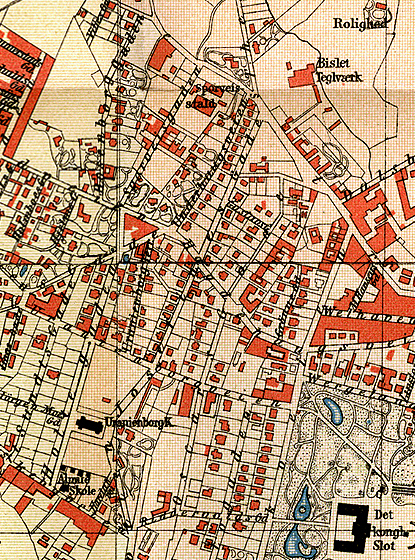
Map of Homansbyen, 1887

Homansbyen is a neighborhood in Frogner borough in Oslo, Norway. The area is named for the lawyer brothers Jacob (1816-1868) and Henrik Homan (1824-1900).

== Area ==
The area is located between the streets of Pilestredet in the east, and Uranienborgveien in the west. It consists of Josefines street or Underhaugsveien in the north, Oscars street in the middle, and Grønnegata to the south.

The boundaries are thus to Bislett in the east, Hegdehaugen in the north, Uranienborg in the west and southwest, behind the Royal Palace in the south.

Hegdehaugsveien goes through the district (north-south), and here is a tram stop which is called Homansbyen.

== History ==
Along with Jacob Homan, Johan Collett bought the land property Frihedssæde in 1853 with the purpose of dividing up and selling as housing lots. A year later Homan and Lars Rasch bought the property Frydendal. At the time the properties were located outside the urban area of Oslo. Few buyer were interested, and in 1857 Collett sold his share to Henrik Homan, and the brothers started in 1858 the construction of finished housing for sale. An area plan was made for the area by Georg Andreas Bull.

A new Oslo T-bane station is planned as Homansbyen.

== Tram depot ==
Homansbyen Depot, officially named Kristiania Sporveisanlæg was a tram depot in Oslo, Norway. It featured an administrative office, a horse stable, a forge, a workshop, a weighing shed and a wagon depot. The installations were constructed by Kristiania Sporveisselskab in 1874. The depot was designed by Henrik Thrap-Meyer, and was located in Sporveisgata 8 near Bislett. It was the first tram depot in Norway, and had places for 28 horse wagons, 16 sleds and 116 horses. The administrative office was built in brick and housed apartments, offices and a laboriatorium for the veterinarian. The depot was reconstructed several times, and taken out of use in 1966. It was demolished three years later, and replaced with residential apartment blocks.
