= August Thomle =

Norwegian judge and politician

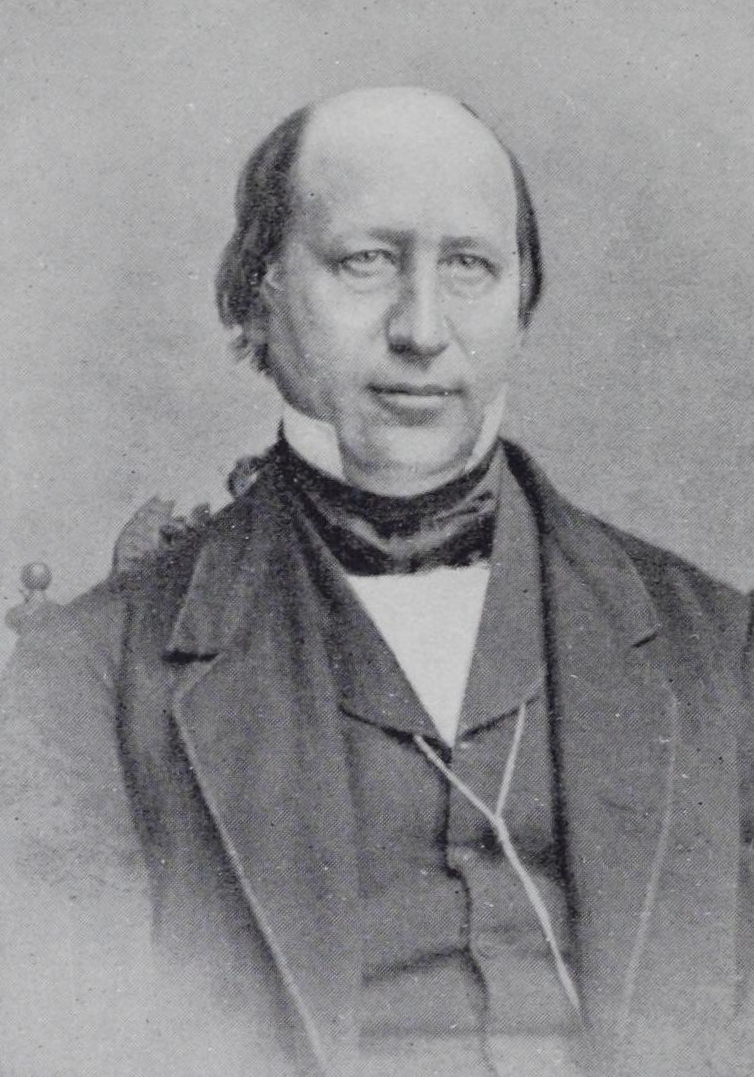
August Thomle portrait

August Thomle (6 June 1816, Arendal – 24 June 1889) was a Norwegian judge and politician.

He was born in Arendal, Norway, as the son of Erich Andreas Thomle and his wife, Mette Maria, née Binneballe. His brother, Iver Steen Thomle, became a jurist and politician. August Thomle married twice: in 1845 and 1860.

In his first marriage, with Helene Marie Fredrikke Binneballe (1820–1851), he had one son: Erik Andreas Thomle, an archivist. In his second marriage, to Cornelia Kraft, he had the sons Carl Sophus Thomle, attorney, and Jens Edvard Thomle, civil servant.

He graduated from the Royal Frederick University in Christiania with the Cand.jur. degree in 1837. He then worked as a clerk for one year, and then attorney in Drammen, Rouen, and Paris. In 1843 he moved back to Christiania. He was mayor of Christiania in 1863. From 1865 to 1881 he worked as Supreme Court Assessor.

He was proclaimed Knight of the Order of St. Olav in 1868. He died in Kristiania.

Political offices
Preceded by Christian Birch-Reichenwald	Mayor of Christania; 1863	Succeeded by Christian Birch-Reichenwald
