= Den Constitutionelle =

19th-century Norwegian newspaper

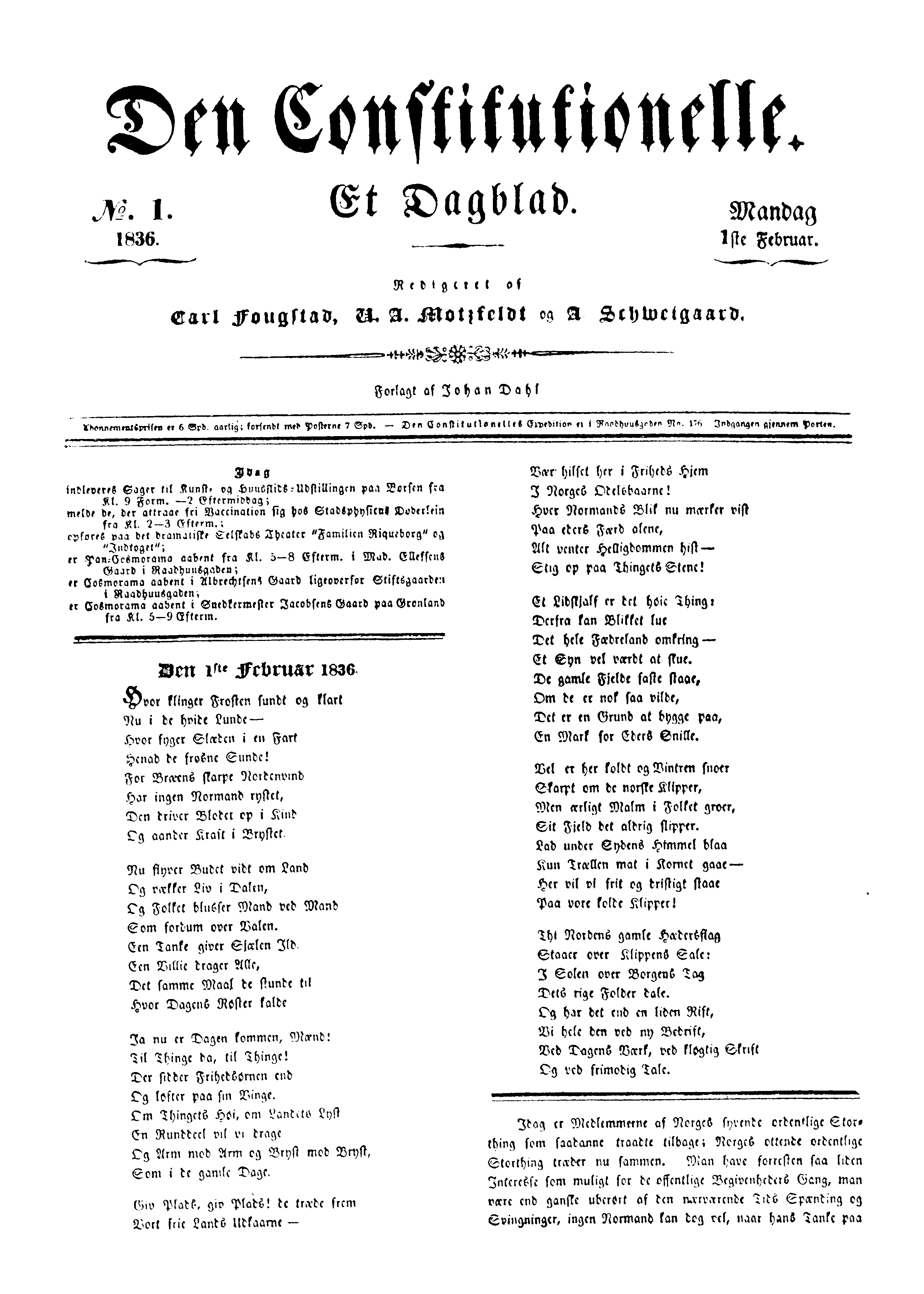
First edition, 1 February 1836

Den Constitutionelle is a former Norwegian daily newspaper, published in Christiania, Norway from 1836 to 1847.

== History and profile ==
Den Constitutionelle was founded in 1836 by bookseller Johan Fjeldsted Dahl, and its first editor was Ulrik Anton Motzfeldt from 1836 to 1840. Andreas Munch edited the newspaper from 1841 to 1846. Den Constitutionelle supported the political and cultural group labelled Intelligenspartiet, and played a significant role in the political discussions of the time.
