= Ulrik Frederik Lange =

Norwegian educator and politician

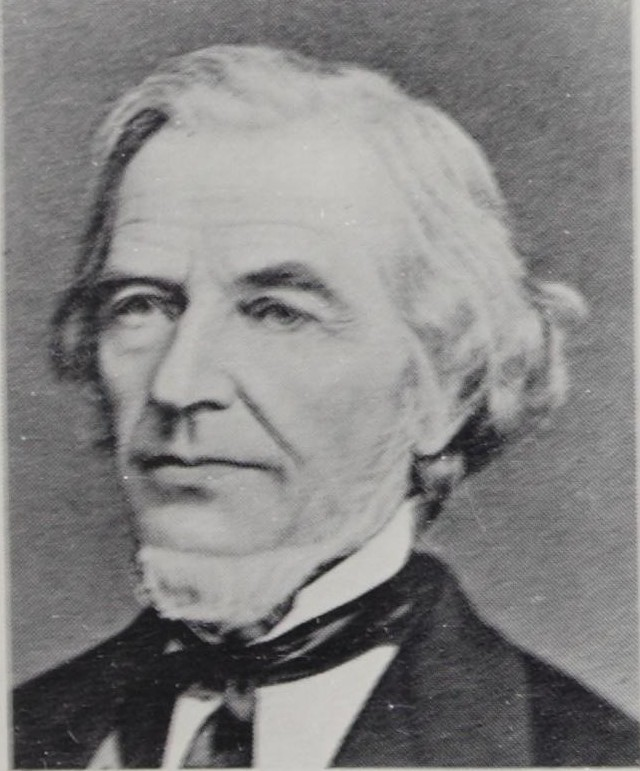
Ulrik Frederik Lange

Ulrik Frederik Lange (28 July 1808 – 8 September 1878) was a Norwegian teacher and politician.

== Background ==
Lange was born at Jevnaker in Oppland, Norway. He was the son of Johan Jørgen Lange (1754–1814) and Dorothea Helena Larsen (1771–1824). He was the younger brother of the politicians Hans Nicolai Lange and Otto Vincent Lange, brother-in-law of Nils Landmark and Even Hanssen and uncle of Johan Jørgen Lange Hanssen. He was a student at Oslo Cathedral School (1826) and graduated with a degree in theology (1832).

== Career ==
Lange was a teacher and school administrator. He worked as a headmaster in Tromsø. From 1849 to 1854, he was the teacher at Lillehammer and principal at the time of his death in 1878. He was elected to the Norwegian Parliament in 1842 and 1845, He was then elected three more times, in 1854, 1857 and 1859, from the Lillehammer og Hamar constituency where he worked as a school principal. Lange sat as mayor in Lillehammer in 1853, 1855 and 1861 to 1863. He was also director of Lillehammer Sparebank (savings bank) from 1855 to 1861.

== Personal life ==
In March 1833, he married Stine Charlotte Cathrine Blix (1808–1890). They had seven children. He died in 1878 in Lillehammer.
