= Papegøien =

Papegøien (English: The Parrot) is a farce from 1835, written by Norwegian writer Henrik Wergeland under the pseudonym "Siful Sifadda".

The farce was published by Johan Dahl's publishing house, and Dahl himself is immortalized through Wergeland's farce, where his course of life forms the basis for a wild parody.

== Synopsis ==
Johan, a spoiled Danish brat, is punished on midsummer eve by his uncle, the "sensible" Tobias Güldenthal (proprietor of the Gyldendal bookstore in Copenhagen). Johan has been naughty, spanking his mother, being rude to people around him, and during his grounding in the garden, he effectively maims and kills a butterfly, a scarab beetle, and ribs the parrot resting nearby. After molesting a bed of flowers, the scent of the flowers drowse him, and he falls asleep. At this point the elves intervene, punishing Johan even more. As they protect nature and all living things, they decide to "borrow" Johan's soul, and put it into the dying parrot. From now on, he will live his life inside the parrot, as the "human condition" is too big for him. The elves wow to come for him if he doesn't better himself. Hence, Johan the parrot is afraid of elves.

After a period of lodging at the house of the poet Promethevs (a parody of the elderly Adam Oehlenschläger), the uncles Tobias and Zacharias decide to send the parrot forth to Norway, to be a book-keeper there, and run the Christiania branch of the Gyldendal bookstore. He is instructed to use covert means of cultural imperialism to subdue Norwegian "patriotism" in any form.

When landing at the quay of Christiania, he is befriended by the poet Polemikkel Poetikkel and his "vehicles", danophiliacs to the extreme. They set up headquarters in Johan's bookstore. Johan, however, writes home to his uncles in "parrot-style", relating his success, and gets bolder. He is "not afraid of elves anymore". He relates also that the Poeticle gang has a sworn enemy, one "Siful", apparently a vulgar fellow he despises. In the bookstore, the gang makes a point of slander all of Siful's poetry (even reciting some of Wergeland's own "high" poems).

At one occasion, Johan is bold enough to enter the botanical gardens at Tøyen, where Siful, allied with the elves, unmask him, and Johan's cover is blown. He sells himself to a troupe of Italian jugglers and returns to Copenhagen.

Poetikkel follows Johan to Denmark, entering the abode of the "sensible" uncle Tobias, to present his lengthy poem on Norwegian topics to him. The poet is thrown out on his ear, with the words "so this is the man who has slandered his mother country, and dares boast of it to the sensible Dane?" At this point, Danish elves return and moves Johan's soul from the parrot over in a new shell, a scarab beetle. Johan finally understands when the rejected Poetikkel ribs him of his legs. Dying, Johan speaks to the poet and begs him to "recognize his errors". To no avail. Poetikkel hangs himself and drops down...

...As the boy Johan wakes from his dream by a falling and rotten pear on his nose. He states that he from now on will be kind to his mother, and "never, ever forget the parrot".

== Themes ==
The biographical themes should be clear: the feud between Wergeland and his contemporary Welhaven. Johan the parrot is in many respects the bookbinder Johan Dahl, himself Danish, who in the end agreed to edit and print this play. Wergeland wrote in spite "the editor is really Johan Dahl" on the title page. In the play, he goes by the name "Johan Papendahl". Contemporary audiences were well aware of the joke. In revenge, Dahl made the first edition as ugly as possible.

The underlying theme is cultural imperialism, mostly on behalf of the Danish-Norwegian cultural conflict. A singing fisherman in the opening parts laments the "cruel waves", who without mercy bring foreigners to Norwegian shores (referring to the Napoleonic Wars and their effect on Norway).

Another theme is the fight between reality and pretence, nature and urbanism, notably in the "elvish" parts, where the "real" poet Siful is on the side of nature and allied with the elves, whereas the urban romantics hardly leave the town at all.

The play is presented as a farce, but is also related to old morality plays, in a combination who is special for Wergeland: the morality farce.
