= Norwegian General Post Directorate =

Norwegian government agency

The Norwegian General Post Directorate (Norwegian: Generalpostdireksjonen) was a Norwegian government agency responsible for postal affairs. It was established in 1857 under the Norwegian Ministry of the Interior, itself non-existent today, and dissolved already in 1860 when its tasks were transferred to the Norwegian Ministry of Postal Affairs.

Its director from 1857 to 1860 was Niels Mathias Rye.
