= Carl Sophus Thomle =

Norwegian attorney

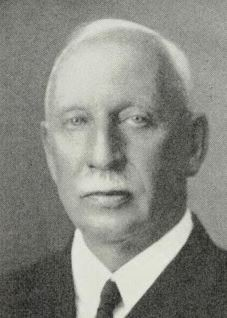
Carl Thomle

Carl Sophus Thomle (18 June 1865 – 1 February 1952) was a Norwegian attorney.

== Personal life ==
He was born in Bygdøy as a son of Supreme Court Justice August Thomle (1816–1889) and Catharine Kraft (1826–1906). He was a brother of civil servant Jens Edvard Thomle and half-brother of archivist Erik Andreas Thomle. In 1900 he married Cecilie Wrensted (1866–1942), daughter of a pharmacist in Kristiansand.

== Career ==
He finished his secondary education in 1883, finished officers' training at the Norwegian Military Academy in 1887 and graduated with the cand.jur. degree from the Royal Frederick University in 1891. He served as a deputy judge in 1892 before being hired in the Ministry of Justice in 1894. After a promotion to secretary in 1899 he changed to the Ministry of Social Affairs in 1913. From 1927 he was an attorney. He also continued in the military for some time, advancing to captain in 1898.

He is best known as a legal writer. He published several influential articles in the journal Tidsskrift for Rettsvitenskap, and twice received the King's Gold Medal for exceptional articles: Gjeldsovertagelse inter vivos efter norsk ret in 1909 and En fremstilling av de hovedregler som i vor rett gjelder om personnavn in 1929. His fields were mainly debt, inheritance and naming law. He published the law collection Almindelig Norsk Lovsamling med Supplementsbind together with Supreme Court Justice Paul Ivar Paulsen and his brother I. E. Thomle. He died in February 1952, and was buried at Vår Frelsers gravlund.
