= Andreas Landmark =

Norwegian politician (1769–1839)

Andreas Landmark (14 April 1769 – 2 December 1839) was a Norwegian politician and civil servant.

== Biography ==
=== Personal life ===
He was born in Christiania to Nils Svensson – a weaver from Värmland, Sweden – and Karen Andersdatter Killerud. His brother was Nils Landmark. Contrary to some sources, he was not born with the name Landmark, but some of the children took the name as adults. Landmark grew up with an uncle in Aurskog.

He married Jacobine Caroline Wind (1733–1833). They had nine children, although at least one died young. Their sons included Jens Landmark, known as a military officer and politician, and Andreas Landmark. His wife, born in Borgund near Aalesund, was a distant relative of the brothers Peter Daniel Baade Wind Kildal and Peter Wessel Wind Kildal.

=== Career ===
Landmark worked as a bailiff (fogd) in Sunnmøre from 1804 to 1829 and was a deputy magistrate in Sunnfjord and Nordfjord. He lived on the Brandal farm in Hareid during his time in office as bailiff. In the center of Brandal, a monument in memory of Landmark was unveiled in the autumn of 1977.

In 1821 he was elected to the Norwegian Parliament, representing the constituency of Romsdals Amt; he served until 1823. His brother Nils Landmark served during the same period.

Landmark was a member of the Sunnmøre Practical Agricultural Society.

Landmark died in 1839 in Ørsta Municipality.
