= Benny Motzfeldt =

Norwegian artist (1909–1995)

- Born: Benny Anette Berg Nilssen; 26 June 1909; Levanger Municipality, Norway
- Died: 24 November 1995 (aged 86)
- Occupations: Visual artist, glass designer and sculptor
- Spouse: Birger Fredrik Motzfeldt (3rd marriage)

Benny Anette Motzfeldt (née Berg Nilssen; 26 June 1909 – 24 November 1995) was a Norwegian visual artist and glass designer and sculptor.

== Biography ==
Benny Anette Berg Motzfeldt was born at Levanger Municipality in Trøndelag, Norway. She was a daughter of physician Andreas Berg Nilssen (1876–1952) and Benny Marie Dahl (1878–1955). She was educated at the Norwegian National Academy of Craft and Art Industry (Statens Håndverks- og Kunstindustriskole) (1931–35) and debuted at the Autumn Exhibition (Høstutstillingen) in Oslo (1936). She engaged as a designer of glass art by Christiania Glasmagasin (1955) and Hadeland Glassverk (1955-67). Later she was an artistic director at Randsfjord Glassworks (1967–70) and then at Glasshytta at PLUS in Fredrikstad Municipality, which she led in the period 1970–79.

Motzfeldt is particularly known for her works with glass. Her works are represented at various museums in Norway, at the National Museum of Art, Architecture and Design in Oslo, at the Victoria and Albert Museum in London, Kunstindustrimuseum in Copenhagen, Nationalmuseum in Stockholm and Frauenau Glass Museum (Donation Wolfgang Kermer) in Germany. She was awarded the Souvenir-prisen (1964), Jakob-prisen (1969) and the Prince Eugen Medal (1985). She was decorated Knight First Class of the Order of St. Olav (1985). In 1992, she was awarded the Anders Jahre Cultural Prize (Anders Jahres kulturpris) jointly with poet Halldis Moren Vesaas (1907–1995).

She was married three times; in her third marriage with Lieutenant General Birger Fredrik Motzfeldt (1898–1987).
