= Birger Fredrik Motzfeldt =

Norwegian military officer (1898–1987)

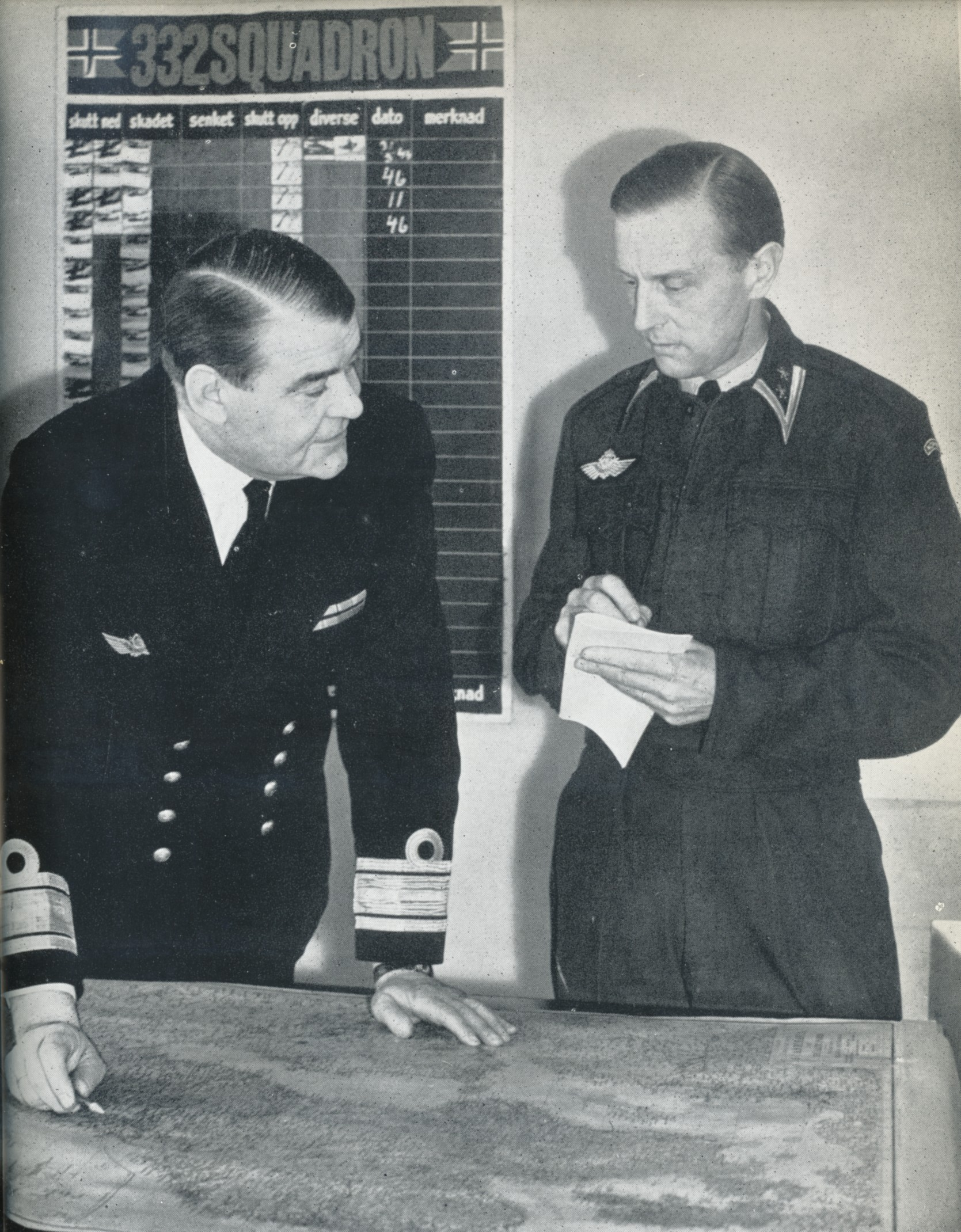
- Hjalmar Riiser-Larsen (left) and Birger F. Motzfeldt
- Born: 22 February 1898; Nesna Municipality, Norway
- Died: 3 September 1987 (aged 89)
- Spouse: Benny Anette Berg-Nilsen
- Military career
- Allegiance: Norway
- Branch: Norwegian Army; Royal Norwegian Air Force
- Service years: 1920–1960
- Rank: Lieutenant general
- Units: His Majesty The King's Guard (1920–1924); Norwegian Army Air Service (1924–1944)
- Commands: Royal Norwegian Air Force (1955–1960)
- Conflicts: World War II
- Awards: Commander with star of the Order of St. Olav; Officer of the Order of the British Empire; Commander of the Royal Victorian Order; Recipient of the Legion of Merit; Recipient of the War Order of Virtuti Militari; Knight of the Order of Orange-Nassau; Knight of the Order of the Sword; Knight of the Order of the Dannebrog

Birger Fredrik Motzfeldt OBE, CVO (22 February 1898 – 3 September 1987) was a Norwegian aviator and military officer.

During World War II he administered the development of the Royal Norwegian Air Force in exile in Great Britain. During the Cold War he contributed to the development of a modernized air force in Norway.

== Personal life ==
Motzfeldt was born in Nesna Municipality, as a son of bailiff Birger Fredrik Motzfeldt and Augusta Marie Andersen. He was married twice, in his second marriage with glass sculptor Benny Anette Berg-Nilsen.

== Career ==
Motzfeldt graduated as a military officer in 1920, and then served with His Majesty The King's Guard and at the Akershus Fortress. He lectured at the Army's pilot training school from 1924 to 1925, and from 1932 to 1935. From 1935 to 1938 he served as aide-de-camp for King Haakon VII.

When the Germans invaded Norway in April 1940, Motzfeldt was in the United States in order to acquire more aircraft for the Norwegian Army Air Service. He was subsequently appointed assistant air attaché in the US. Among his initiatives was the establishing of the pilot training camp Little Norway. He returned to London in 1941, and took part in the development of the Royal Norwegian Air Force in exile in Great Britain. He was also involved in the air route between Stockholm and Scotland during the war. During the Cold War he contributed to the development of a modernized air force in Norway. He was promoted to the rank of major general in 1953, and to lieutenant general in 1955. He was appointed head of the Royal Norwegian Air Force from 1955 to 1960, succeeding fellow World War II veteran Finn Lambrechts. The Royal Norwegian Air Force went through significant development during his leadership.

== Decorations ==
Motzfeldt was decorated Commander with star of the Order of St. Olav in 1956. He was Commander of the British Royal Victorian Order, and Knight of the Swedish Order of the Sword and the Danish Order of the Dannebrog. He was also a recipient of the American Legion of Merit.

Motzfeldt was also decorated Officer of the Order of the British Empire (OBE), with the Polish War Order of Virtuti Militari, and Knight of the Dutch Order of Orange-Nassau.
