= Christian Adolph Diriks =

Norwegian politician (1775–1837)

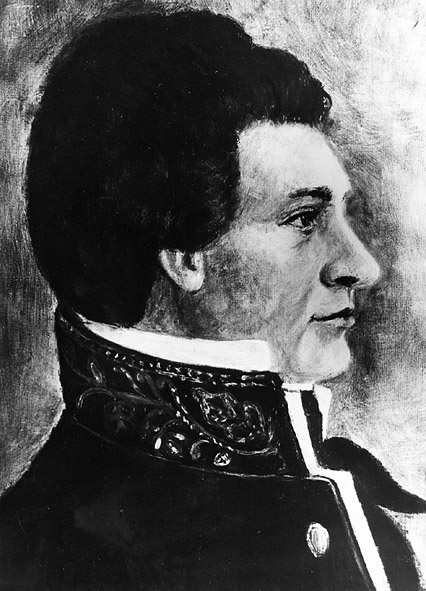

Minister of Education and Church Affairs
- In office 16 September 1825 – 10 November 1836
- Prime Minister: M. Sommerhielm; S. Løvenskiold
- Preceded by: Poul C. Holst
- Succeeded by: Oluf Borch de Schouboe

Minister of Justice
- In office 4 March 1818 – 16 September 1825
- Prime Minister: Peder Anker; M. Sommerhielm
- Preceded by: Christian Krohg
- Succeeded by: Poul C. Holst
- In office 15 May 1817 – 15 October 1817
- Prime Minister: Peder Anker
- Preceded by: M. Sommerhielm
- Succeeded by: Christian Krohg
- In office 15 June 1815 – 15 September 1816
- Prime Minister: Peder Anker
- Preceded by: M. Sommerhielm
- Succeeded by: M. Sommerhielm

Personal details
- Born: 1 November 1775 Copenhagen, Denmark-Norway
- Died: 16 December 1837 (aged 62) Christiania, United Kingdoms of Sweden and Norway
- Spouse: Maren Cathrine Tax
- Children: 9
- Occupation: University of Copenhagen; Assessor in Kristiansand

Christian Adolph Diriks (1 November 1775 – 16 December 1837) was a Norwegian lawyer and statesman. He served as a representative at the Norwegian Constitutional Assembly in 1814.

== Biography ==
Christian Adolph Diriks was born in Copenhagen, Denmark. He was the son of maritime captain Boye Boyesen Dyriks (1744–80) and Marie Elisabeth Stoppel (d. 1797). After studying law at the University of Copenhagen, he earned his cand. jur. in 1795. He worked for some years in the city court of Copenhagen. In 1806, Diriks was appointed Assessor in Kristiansand. In 1812, he was made Director of the Justice Court (Justisråd) for Laurvig (now Larvik). Diriks was Magistrate in Laurvig and Judge from 1812 to 1815.

It was from Laurvig that he was elected to the Constitutional Assembly. As the legal secretary of the Constitutional Committee, he played an important part in shaping the language of the Norwegian Constitution. Diriks was the Assembly's resident expert on foreign constitutions, and emphasized civil liberties. He was responsible for the inclusion of §100, concerning freedom of speech, and §102, guarding against unreasonable searches and seizures. He was later made president of the Assembly, with responsibility for passing the Constitution.

Shortly after the dissolution of the Assembly, Diriks was appointed professor of law at the newly founded Royal Frederick University (today's University of Oslo), but continuing government responsibilities prevented him from taking up the position. Among the positions he held were Minister of the Police and Minister of Justice from 1814 to 1818, and Minister of Education and Church Affairs from 1825 to 1836. He did not enjoy the support of Count Wedel-Jarlsberg, however and when Wedel-Jarlsberg was appointed Governor-general of Norway in 1836, Diriks was forced to retire.

== Personal life ==
Christian Adolph Diriks was married to Maren Cathrine Tax (1772-1848). They were the parents of nine children including Norwegian government minister Christian Ludvig Diriks and Norwegian maritime officer Carl Frederik Diriks. Christian Adolph Diriks was also the grandfather of the artist Edvard Diriks.

== Related Reading ==
- Holme Jørn (2014) De kom fra alle kanter - Eidsvollsmennene og deres hus (Oslo: Cappelen Damm) ISBN 978-82-02-44564-5
- Weidling, Tor (2000) Eneveldets menn i Norge: Sivile sentralorganer og embetsmenn 1660–1814 (Oslo: Riksarkivaren) ISBN 82-548-0065-0

Political offices
Preceded by Georg Sverdrup, Christian Magnus Falsen, Christian A. Diriks, Jens S. Fabricius, Diderik Hegermann, Peder Anker	President of the Storting; 1814	Succeeded by Wilhelm F. K. Christie
