= Peter Motzfeldt =

Norwegian military officer and government minister

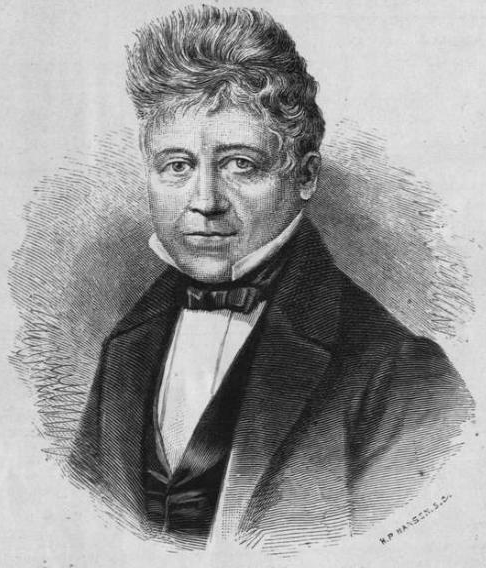
- Born: 3 August 1777; Orkdalen, Søndre Trondhjem, Norway
- Died: 1 April 1854 (aged 76)
- Occupations: Military officer, Government minister
- Spouse: Margrethe Stenersen (m. 1789; died 1848)

Peter Motzfeldt (3 August 1777 – 1 April 1854) was a Norwegian military officer and government minister. He served as a member of the Constitutional Assembly at Eidsvoll Manor in 1814.

== Background ==
Motzfeldt was born in Orkdal in Søndre Trondhjem county, Norway. He was the son of infantry captain Ulrik Anton Motzfeldt (1738–83) and Andrea Birgitte Bull. When his father died in 1783, Motzfeldt lived with his uncle, Major Jacob Motzfeldt. He was a cousin of Frederik Motzfeldt and Carl Frederik Motzfeldt. In 1792, he entered the Artillery Academy in Copenhagen and became a second lieutenant in the artillery, stationed in Fredrikstad in 1796. He was later stationed in the Danish West Indies and was held as a prisoner of war by Great Britain. In 1809, he became commander of an artillery corps in Bergen, Norway.

== Political career ==
In 1814, he was elected as a representative from the Bergen Artillery Corp (Artillerie-Corpset) at the National Assembly in Eidsvoll. He supported the position of the Independence Party (Selvstendighetspartiet) and was a supporter of Crown Prince Christian Frederik and opponent of the union with Sweden. Motzfeldt was a member of the Council of State Division in Stockholm 1814–1816, 1818–1819, 1824–1825, 1828–1829, 1831–1832, and 1834–1835, Minister of the Army 1816–1818 and 1819–1822, and Minister of Auditing 1829–1831, 1832–1834, 1835–1836, and 1836–1837.

== Personal life ==
He was married to Ernesta Birgitte Margrethe Stenersen (1789–1848). They were the parents of jurist Ulrik Anton Motzfeldt and government official Ketil Motzfeldt. Their daughter, Jacobine Ida Sophie Motzfeldt, married politician Christian Birch-Reichenwald. Their grandson was statesman, Ernst Motzfeldt. Peter Motzfeldt died during 1854 and was buried at Vår Frelsers gravlund in Oslo.
