= Carl Frederik Diriks =

Norwegian lighthouse director Illustrator

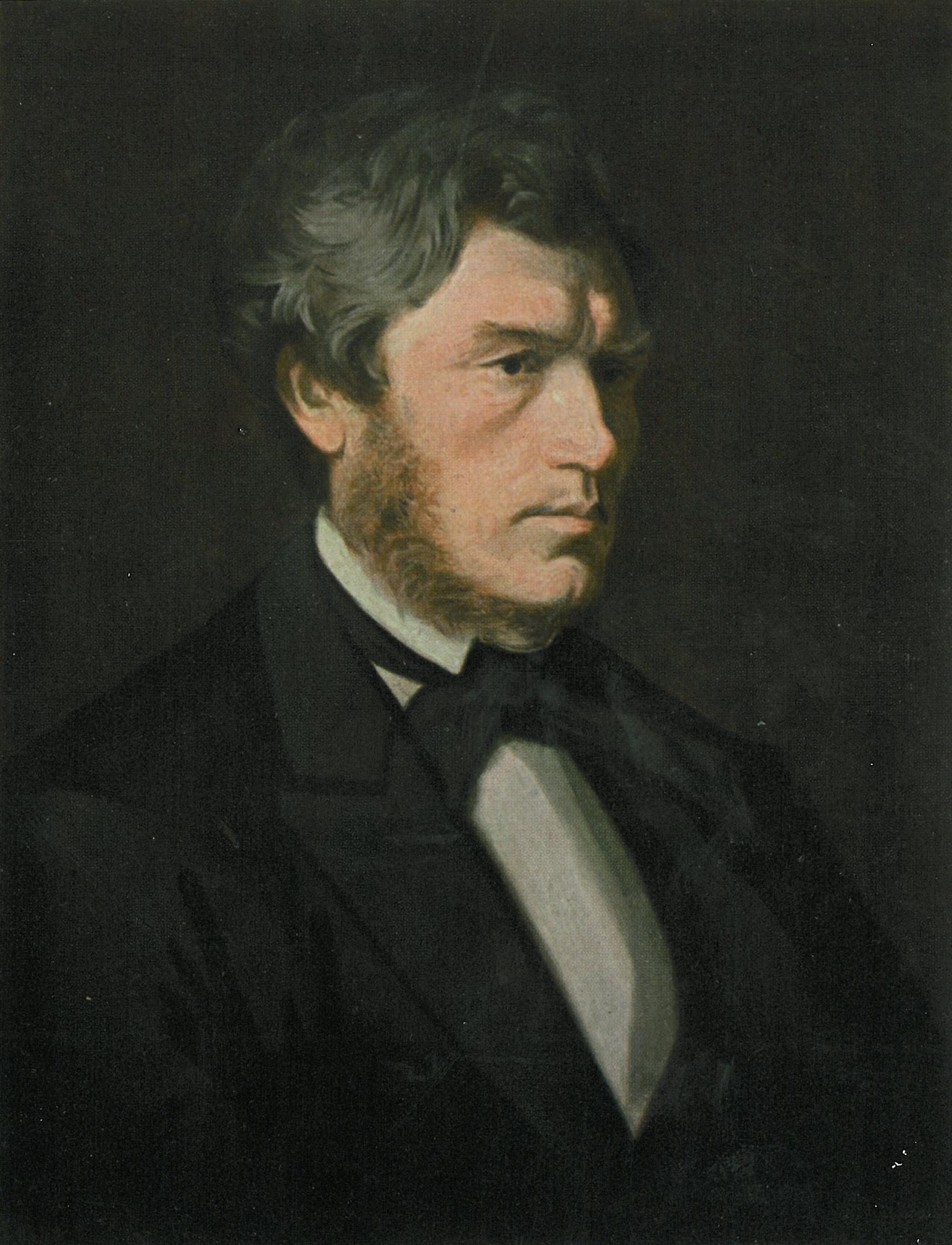
- Born: 26 March 1814; Larvik, Norway
- Died: 3 March 1895 (aged 80); Kristiania, Norway
- Occupations: Lighthouse director Illustrator

Carl Frederik Diriks (26 March 1814 – 3 March 1895) was a Norwegian maritime officer, lighthouse director and illustrator. He was born in Larvik to government minister Christian Adolph Diriks and Maren Cathrine Tax. He was uncle of Edvard Diriks, and father-in-law of county manager and government minister Nikolai Prebensen.

Diriks was appointed director of the Norwegian Lighthouse administration from 1855 to 1881. He is also known for his illustrations. Among his publications are the children's book Lille Anna from 1868 and the illustration series Allehaande (eight volumes, 1869–1882). He was decorated Commander, First Class of the Order of St. Olav in 1880.
