= Edvard Diriks =

Norwegian painter (1855–1930)

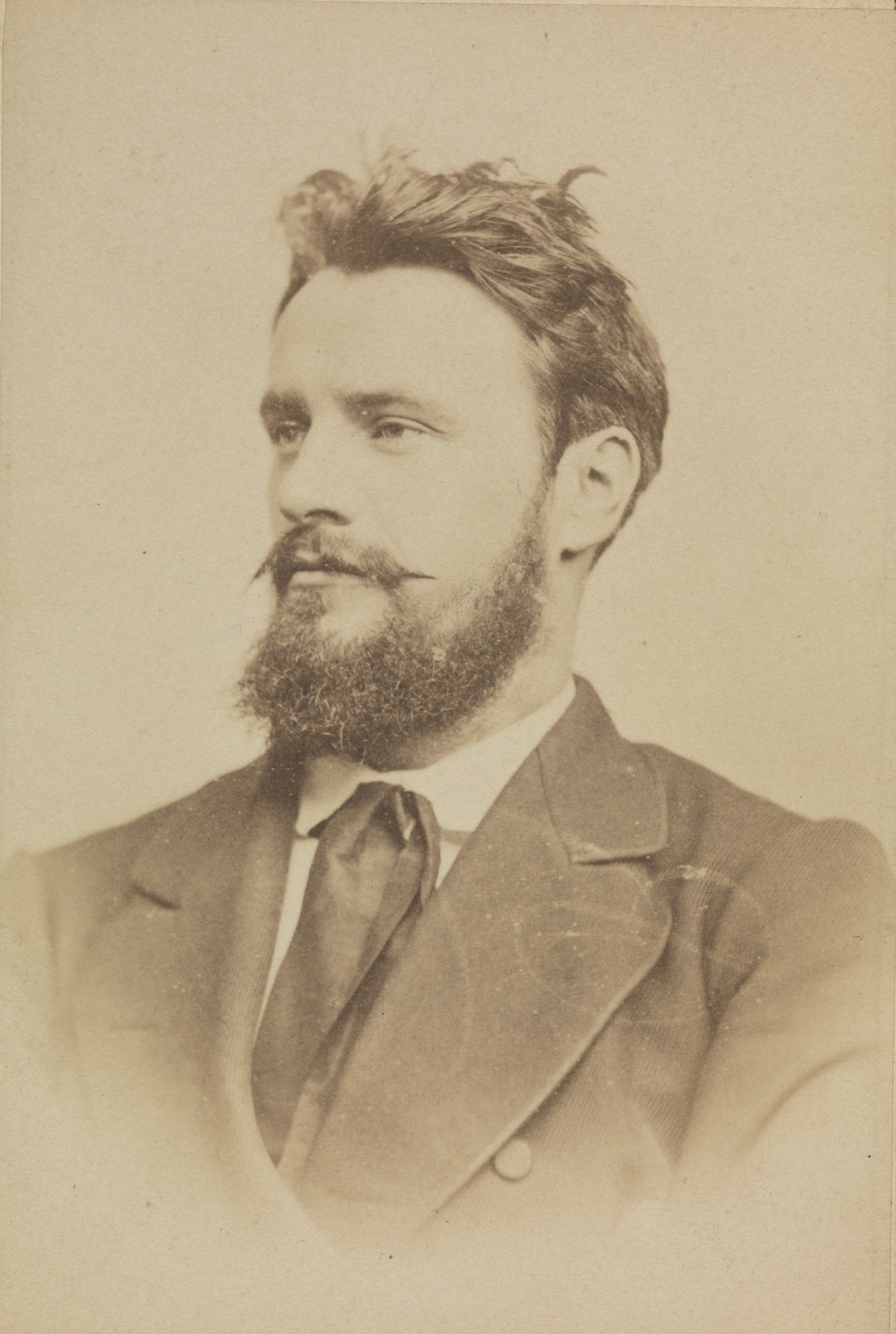
- Born: 9 January 1855; Christiania, Norway
- Died: 17 March 1930 (aged 75); Horten, Norway
- Occupation: Painter
- Awards: Order of St. Olav; Legion of Honour

Karl Edvard Diriks (9 January 1855 – 17 March 1930) was a Norwegian painter.

== Biography ==
He was born in Christiania (now Oslo, Norway) to Christian Ludvig Diriks and Benedicte Henriette Munch. He was a grandson of government minister Christian Adolph Diriks (1775–1837), a nephew of maritime officer and lighthouse director Carl Frederik Diriks (1814–1895)., and a cousin of Edvard Munch.

He began to study in Germany where he became acquainted with Norwegian and German painters Christian Krohg, Hans Gude, Frits Thaulow and Max Klinger. He first studied to become an architect at Karlsruhe from 1874 to 1875. He accompanied Krohg and Klinger to Berlin in the autumn of 1875 as a student at the Bauakademie.

In the autumn of 1879 he settled in Christiania. On his first trip to Paris in 1882–83, he had become acquainted with Impressionism. He married in 1892, to Swedish-born artist and sculptor Anna Diriks (1870-1932) and settled in Drøbak. They resided in France between 1899 and 1921. They settled in 1922 at Drøbak.

He is known for his naturalist outdoor paintings of clouds, rain squalls, snow flurry, storms and rough seas. He is represented with thirteen works in the National Gallery of Norway, in a number of other Norwegian galleries, and in galleries in France and Germany. He was decorated Knight, First Class of the Order of St. Olav, and Officer of the French Legion of Honour in 1920.

== Gallery ==
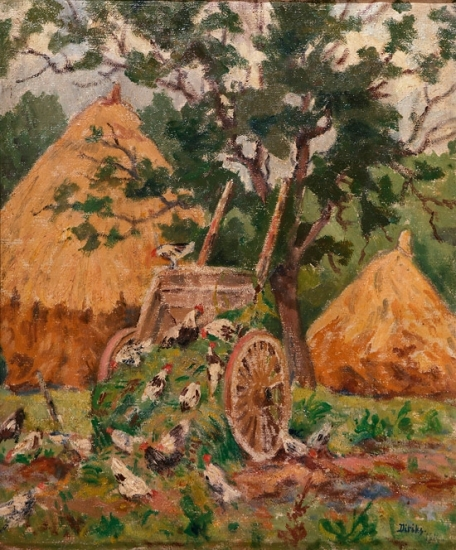
Chickens, France (1914)

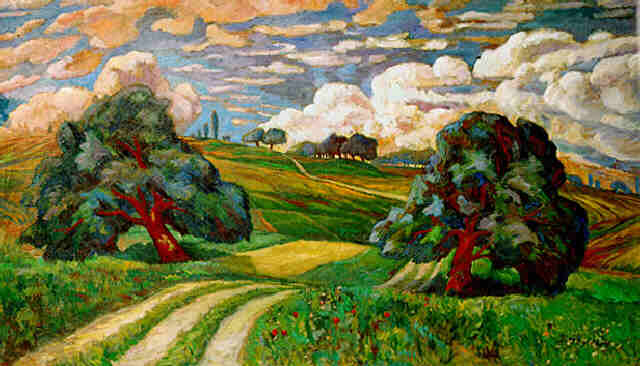
After the Storm (1904)

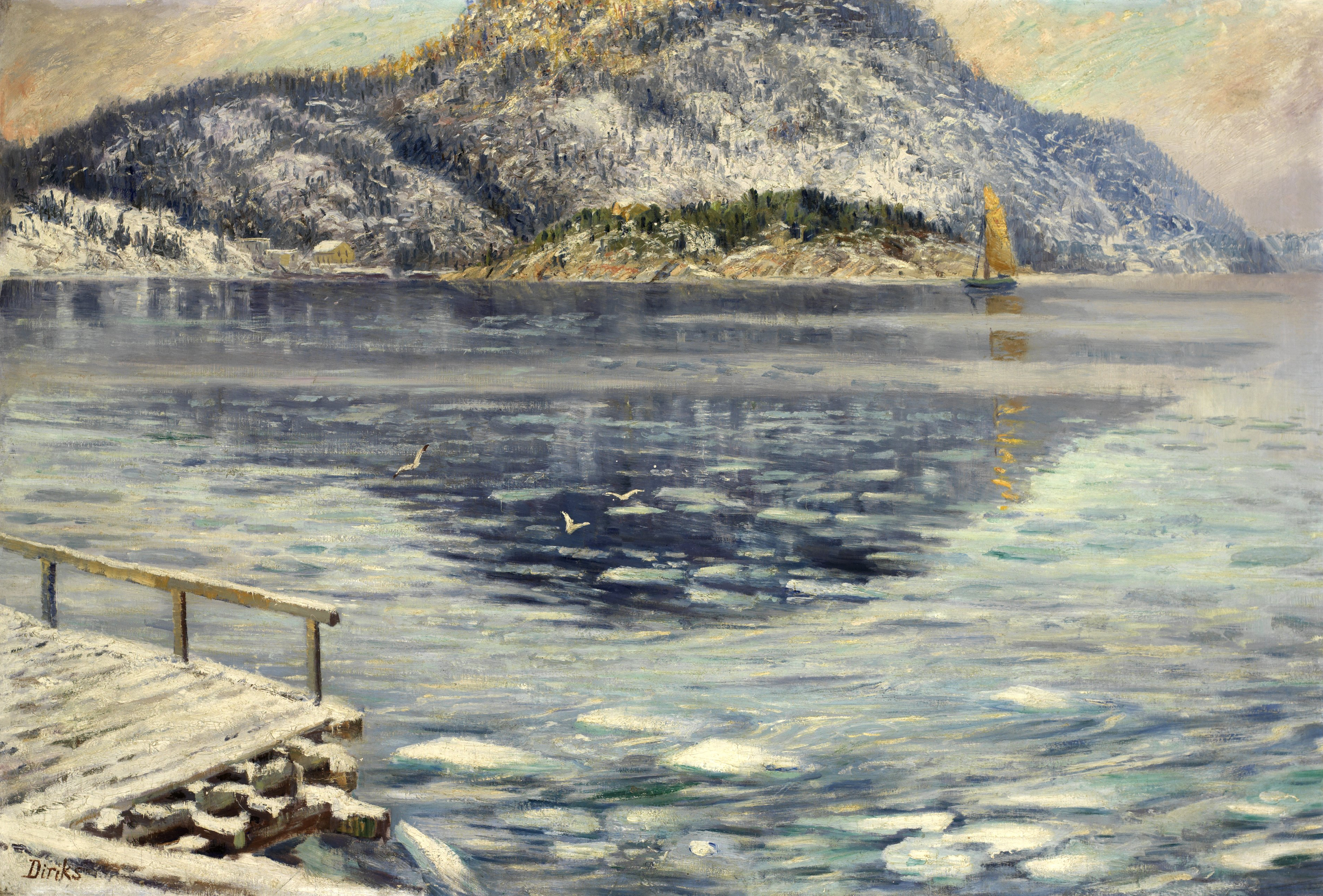
Thawing Ice

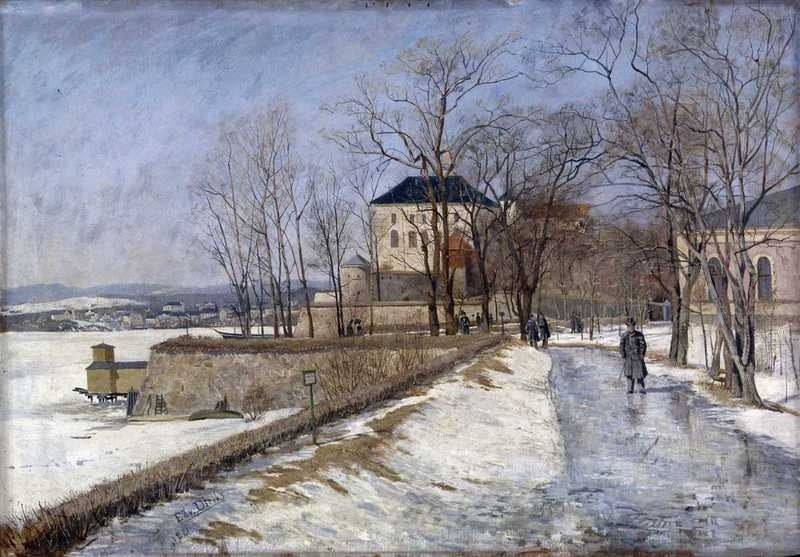
From Akershus (1881)

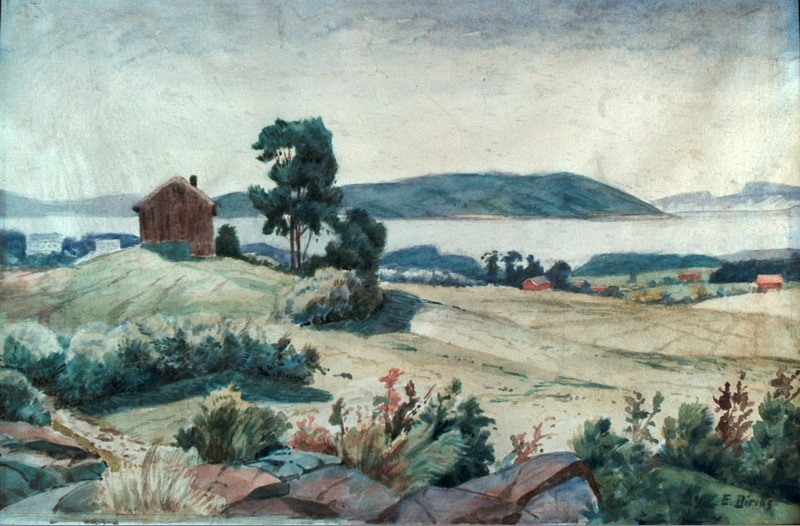
From Frøensjordene (1880)
