= Frederik Motzfeldt =

Norwegian politician

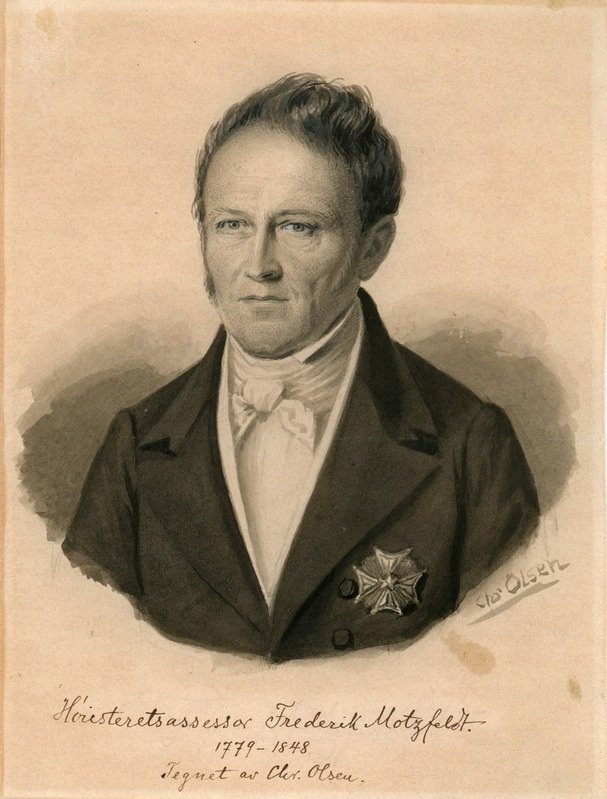
Frederik Motzfeldt

Frederik Motzfeldt (2 November 1779 – 2 January 1848) was a Norwegian politician. He was a member of the Norwegian Constituent Assembly at Eidsvoll Manor in 1814.

Motzfeldt was born at Skaun in Søndre Trondhjem county, Norway. He was raised in Trondhjem. He was the son of Major Jacob Motzfeldt (1744–1816) and Sophia Cathrine Mühlenphort (1751–1789). He was a cousin of Peter Motzfeldt and Carl Frederik Motzfeldt. He graduated as cand.jur. in 1801.

He worked as both stipendiary magistrate (byfoged) and district stipendiary magistrate (sorenskriver) at Molde in Romsdal, Norway. He was a member of the Norwegian Constituent Assembly in 1814, representing Molde. He generally supported the position of the Independence Party (Selvstendighetspartiet).

He left Molde later in 1814 to work as a Supreme Court assessor. In 1821 he was appointed Auditor General of Norway, a post he held until 1827. He continued to work at the Office of the Auditor General of Norway until 1845. He was elected to the Norwegian Parliament in 1830, representing the constituency of Christiania. He had been a deputy representative in 1827.

Government offices
Preceded by Marcus S. Lyng	Auditor General of Norway; 1821–1827	Succeeded by Lauritz Nicolai Kraft
