= Otto Vincent Lange =

Norwegian politician (1797–1870)

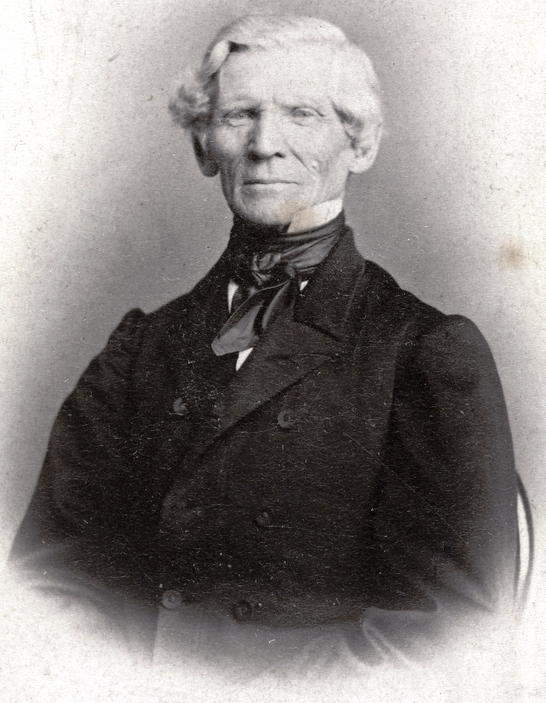
- Otto Vincent Lange

Member of Parliament
- In office 1833–1856

Minister of Church and Education (Norway)
- In office 7 October 1854 – 31 August 1855

Minister of Finance and Customs (Norway)
- In office 1 September 1855 – 31 May 1856
- In office 1 August 1857 – 14 August 1858
- In office 1 October 1859 – 11 August 1861
- In office 1 September 1862 – 21 June 1863

Member of the Council of State Division in Stockholm
- In office 1 June 1856 – 31 July 1857
- In office 1 September 1858 – 30 September 1859
- In office 1 September 1861 – 31 August 1862

Personal details
- Born: 30 November 1797 Jevnaker
- Died: 4 November 1870 (aged 72) Kristiania
- Party: Independent
- Spouse: Anne Nicoline Aall (1800–1886)
- Relations: Ulrik Frederik Lange (brother); Jacob Aall (father-in-law); Niels Aall (brother-in-law); Jørgen Aall (brother-in-law)
- Occupation: School teacher Surveyor of customs and excise

Otto Vincent Lange (30 November 1797 – 4 November 1870) was a Norwegian politician.

Lange was born in Jevnaker, but moved to Arendal. He worked as a school teacher, and helped found the local library and museum in 1832. In 1833 he was elected to the Norwegian Parliament for the first time. He then changed his civil job to that of surveyor of customs and excise. He was elected to the Norwegian Parliament in 1836, 1839, 1842, 1845, 1848, 1851 and 1854, representing the constituency of Arendal og Grimstad.

In October 1854 he was appointed Minister of Church and Education, succeeding Jørgen Herman Vogt. In September 1855 he left that succeeded Vogt again, this time as Minister of Finance and Customs. He held this position periodically until June 1863, interrupted by spells as member of the Council of State Division in Stockholm from 1 June 1856 to 31 July 1857, 1 September 1858 to 30 September 1859 and 1 September 1861 to 31 August 1862.

Otto Vincent Lange was married to Anne Nicoline Aall (1800–1886), daughter of businessperson, politician and historian Jacob Aall. The Aall family was a notable one; Anne Nicoline Aall's grandfather was businessman Nicolai Benjamin Aall (died 1798) and her uncles were politicians Niels and Jørgen Aall. Also, Otto Vincent Lange had a brother Ulrik Frederik Lange who was an educator and five-term member of Parliament. Otto Vincent's sister Barbara Abigael married Even Hanssen, whose son Johan Jørgen Lange Hanssen married Otto Vincent's daughter Lovise Jacobine.

Otto Vincent Lange was proclaimed Knight of the Order of St. Olav 1847, promoted to Commander in 1857, and in 1863 was awarded the Grand Cross in 1863. He was awarded two Swedish orders: the Grand Cross of the Order of the Polar Star and Knight of the Order of Vasa. Lange also held the first class (equivalent to Grand Cross) of the Ottoman Mecidi Order.

He died in 1870 in Kristiania and was buried at Vår Frelsers gravlund.

Political offices
Preceded by Jørgen Herman Vogt	Minister of Church and Education; 1854–1855	Succeeded by Hans Riddervold
Preceded by Jørgen Herman Vogt	Minister of Finance and Customs; 1855–1856	Succeeded by Erik Røring Møinichen
Preceded by Erik Røring Møinichen	Minister of Finance and Customs; 1857–1858	Succeeded by Erik Røring Møinichen
Preceded by Erik Røring Møinichen	Minister of Finance and Customs; 1859–1861	Succeeded by Erik Røring Møinichen
Preceded by Erik Røring Møinichen	Minister of Finance and Customs; 1862–1863	Succeeded by Henrik Laurentius Helliesen
