= Ketil Motzfeldt =

Norwegian Naval Officer and Government Official

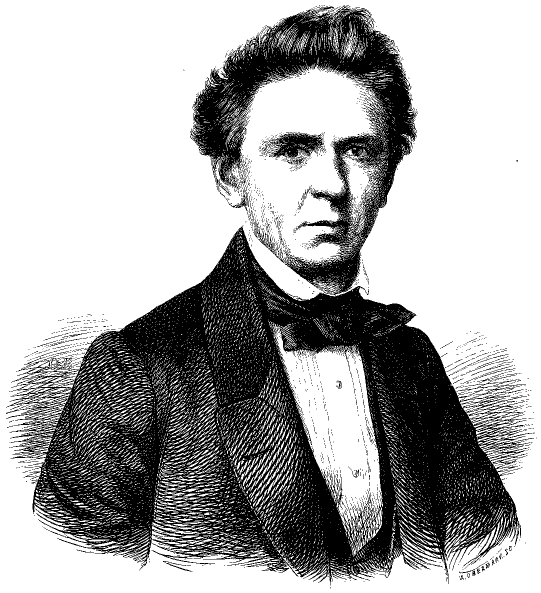
Ketil Melsted Johnsen Motzfeldt

Ketil Melsted Johnsen Motzfeldt (10 August 1814 – 17 November 1889) was a Norwegian naval officer and government official.

== Background ==
Motzfeldt was born in Bergen, Norway. His parents were government minister Peter Motzfeldt (1777-1854) and Ernesta Birgitte Margrethe Stenersen (1789-1848). He was the brother of Ulrik Anton Motzfeldt and brother-in-law of Christian Birch-Reichenwald. He was a nephew of both Frederik Motzfeldt and Carl Frederik Motzfeldt.

== Career ==
Motzfeldt was naval cadet at Fredriksvern Norwegian naval base in 1826. He was a second lieutenant by 1841, then First Lieutenant in 1852. He entered the Norwegian Parliament in 1857. He was Minister of the Navy and Minister of Postal Affairs in 1860, member of the Council of State Division in Stockholm 1860–1861, and Minister of the Navy in 1861. From 1870 to 1885, he was elected as a member of Parliament from Jarlsberg og Laurvigs Amt (now Vestfold).

== Personal life ==
He was married to Hedvig Susanne Amalie Rosenvinge (1840-1903), the daughter of Eiler Schøller Rosenvinge (1813-1849), a member of the aristocratic Rosenvinge family.
