= Christian Ludvig Diriks =

Norwegian government minister and general auditor

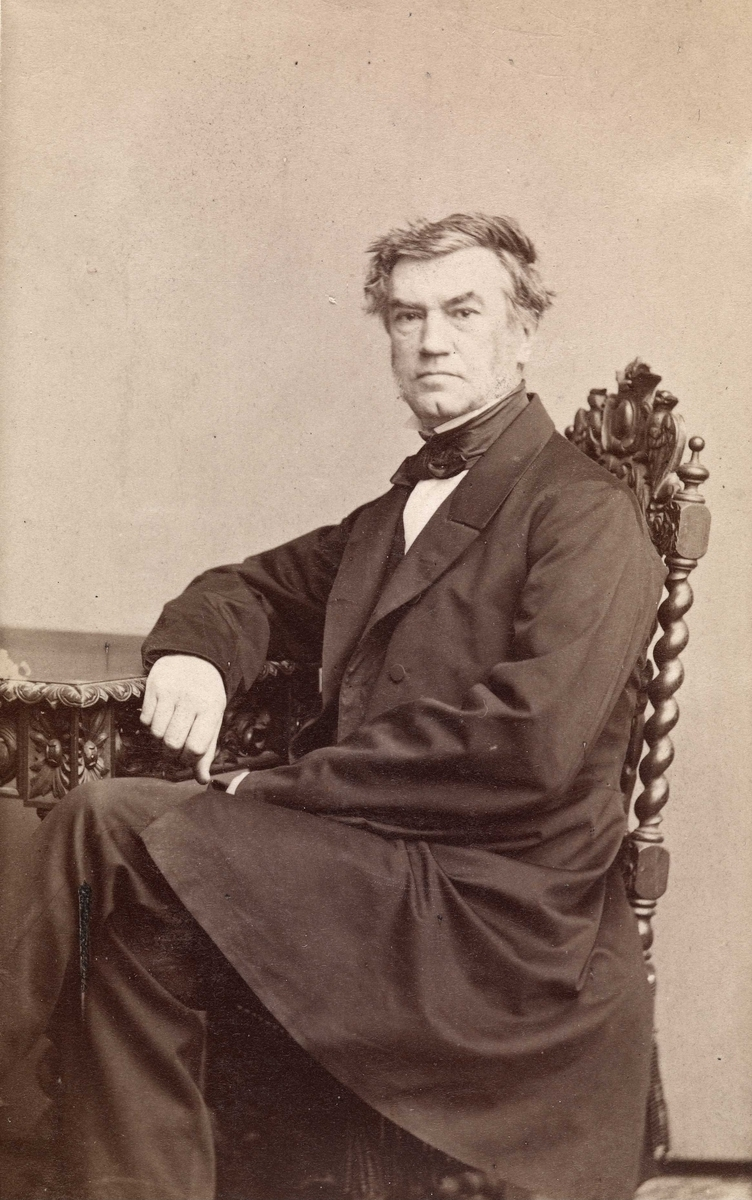
Christian Ludvig Diriks

Christian Ludvig Diriks (16 October 1802 – 9 July 1873) was a Norwegian government minister and general auditor.

Diriks was born in Copenhagen, Denmark. He was the son of Norwegian statesman Christian Adolph Diriks. He grew up in Laurvig, Norway where his father was Magistrate and Judge. He was cand. jur. in 1830 and an auditor in 1833. In 1840 he became a member of the Military Law Commission. He served as Minister of Auditing for two brief periods in 1856 and 1857, and later as temporary Minister of Postal Affairs in 1861.

He was married to Henriette Benedicte Munch (1823-1912) and was father of painter Edvard Diriks.
