= Ulrik Anton Motzfeldt =

Norwegian politician

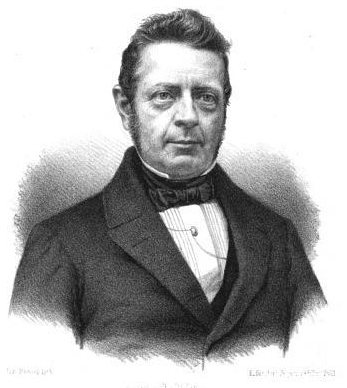
Ulrik Anton Motzfeldt

Ulrik Anton Motzfeldt (27 January 1807 – 10 July 1865) was a Norwegian jurist and politician. He served five terms in the Norwegian Parliament, including two years as President. He was also a professor at the University of Christiania and an Assessor of the Supreme Court.

== Personal life ==
Ulrik Anton Motzfeldt was born on the island St. Thomas, then part of the Danish West Indies. His father, Peter Motzfeldt (1777–1854) was a noted military officer and father of the Norwegian Constitution who was stationed on St. Thomas from 1802 to 1809, Ulrik's mother, Ernesta Birgitte Margrethe Stenersen (1789–1848), was the daughter of the B. C. Stenersen, stipendiary magistrate of St. Thomas. Ulrik's younger brother Ketil was also a noted statesman. In addition, their paternal great-grandmother Birgitte Andrea Bull was a first cousin of Johan Lausen Bull and Norway's first Supreme Court Justice Johan Randulf Bull.

Ulrik Anton Motzfeldt married twice. The marriage with his first wife produced two daughters. Their daughter Marie Sophie Erneste married jurist and politician Ulrik Fredrik Christian Arneberg. Motzfeldt later married Anna Pauline Jørgine Birch, and the couple had two sons and one daughter. Their oldest son Ernst became a government minister.

== Career ==
Ulrik Anton Motzfeldt enrolled as a law student in 1823, and graduated with the cand.jur. degree in 1826. In 1829 he was hired as a lector at the Royal Frederick University (now University of Oslo). He was promoted in 1834, to professor of jurisprudence. His most important publications include Den norske Kirkeret (1844) and Lovgivningen om Odelsretten og Aasædesretten (1846). From 1842 Ulrik Anton Motzfeldt also served as a Supreme Court Assessor.

Motzfeldt was elected to the Norwegian Parliament in 1851, representing the constituency of Smaalenenes Amt (now Østfold). He was re-elected in 1854, but this time representing the city of Christiania (now Oslo). He was then re-elected in 1857, 1859 and finally in 1862. He served as President of the Storting from 1857 to 1858, and President of the Lagting from 1859 to 1860. He also served as mayor of Kristiania from 1853 to 1860.

Political offices
Preceded by Lars Rasch	Mayor of Oslo; 1853–1860	Succeeded by Frederik Stang
Preceded by Hans J. C. Aall; Georg Prahl Harbitz	President of the Storting; 1857–1858	Succeeded by Hans J. C. Aall; Georg Prahl Harbitz
