= Hansteen (surname) =

Hamnes is a Norwegian surname. Notable people with the surname include:

- Aasta Hansteen (1824–1908), Norwegian painter, writer, and early feminist
- Agathon Bartholomæus Hansteen (1812–1895), Norwegian priest and politician
- Christopher Hansteen (1784–1873), Norwegian astronomer and physicist
- Christopher Hansteen (1822–1912), Norwegian judge
- Conradine Birgitte Hansteen (1780–1866), Norwegian socialite and writer
- Geir Hansteen Jörgensen, Swedish Film-director
- Kirsten Hansteen (1903–1974), Norwegian editor and librarian
- Nils Hansteen (1855–1912), Norwegian painter
- Viggo Hansteen (1900–1941), Norwegian lawyer
  - Viggo Hansteen (ship)
- Wilhelm von Tangen Hansteen (1896–1980), Norwegian military officer
- Waldemar Hansteen (1857–1921), Norwegian architect
