= Schjøtt =

People with the surname Schjøtt

- Aase Schiøtt Jacobsen
- Hagbarth Schjøtt, Jr.
- Hagbarth Schjøtt, Sr.
- Halfdan Schjøtt
- Ivar Schjøtt
- Karl Eirik Schjøtt-Pedersen
- Mathilde Schjøtt
- Mie Schjøtt-Kristensen
- Ole Hersted Schjøtt
- Peter Olrog Schjøtt
- Sofie Schjøtt
- Steinar Schjøtt
- Trygve Schjøtt
