= Hansteen =

Hansteen may refer to:

- Hansteen (surname), Norwegian surname
- Hansteen (crater), a lunar crater named after Christopher Hansteen
- Hansteen Holdings, UK listed company
