= Bernhard Dunker =

Norwegian jurist, barrister and Attorney General of Norway

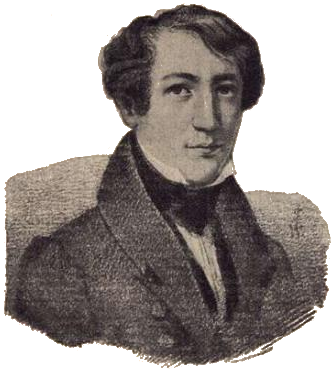
- Born: 22 May 1809; Duchy of Schleswig in Southern Jutland
- Died: 28 July 1870 (aged 61); Christiania
- Occupations: Jurist; Writer
- Known for: Attorney General of Norway 1859–1870
- Children: Mathilde Schjøtt (daughter)
- Parent: Conradine Birgitte Dunker (mother)
- Relatives: Vilhelmine Ullmann (sister); Christopher Hansteen (uncle); Ragna Nielsen (niece); Viggo Ullmann (nephew); Jens Gram Dunker (grandson); Peter Olrog Schjøtt (son-in-law); Sofie Schjøtt (granddaughter)

Bernhard Dunker (22 May 1809 – 28 July 1870) was a Norwegian jurist, barrister and Attorney General of Norway.

== Personal life ==
Dunker was born in the Duchy of Schleswig in Southern Jutland to Conradine Birgitte Hansteen and Johan Friedrich Wilhelm Dunker, and came to Norway when he was one year old. He was a brother of Vilhelmine Ullmann, and nephew of astronomer Christopher Hansteen. He married Edle Jasine Theodore Grundt in 1839, and among their children was writer and feminist Mathilde Schjøtt. He was uncle of politician and feminist Ragna Nielsen and educator and politician Viggo Ullmann, grandfather of architect Jens Gram Dunker, and father-in-law of philologist and politician Peter Olrog Schjøtt.

== Career ==
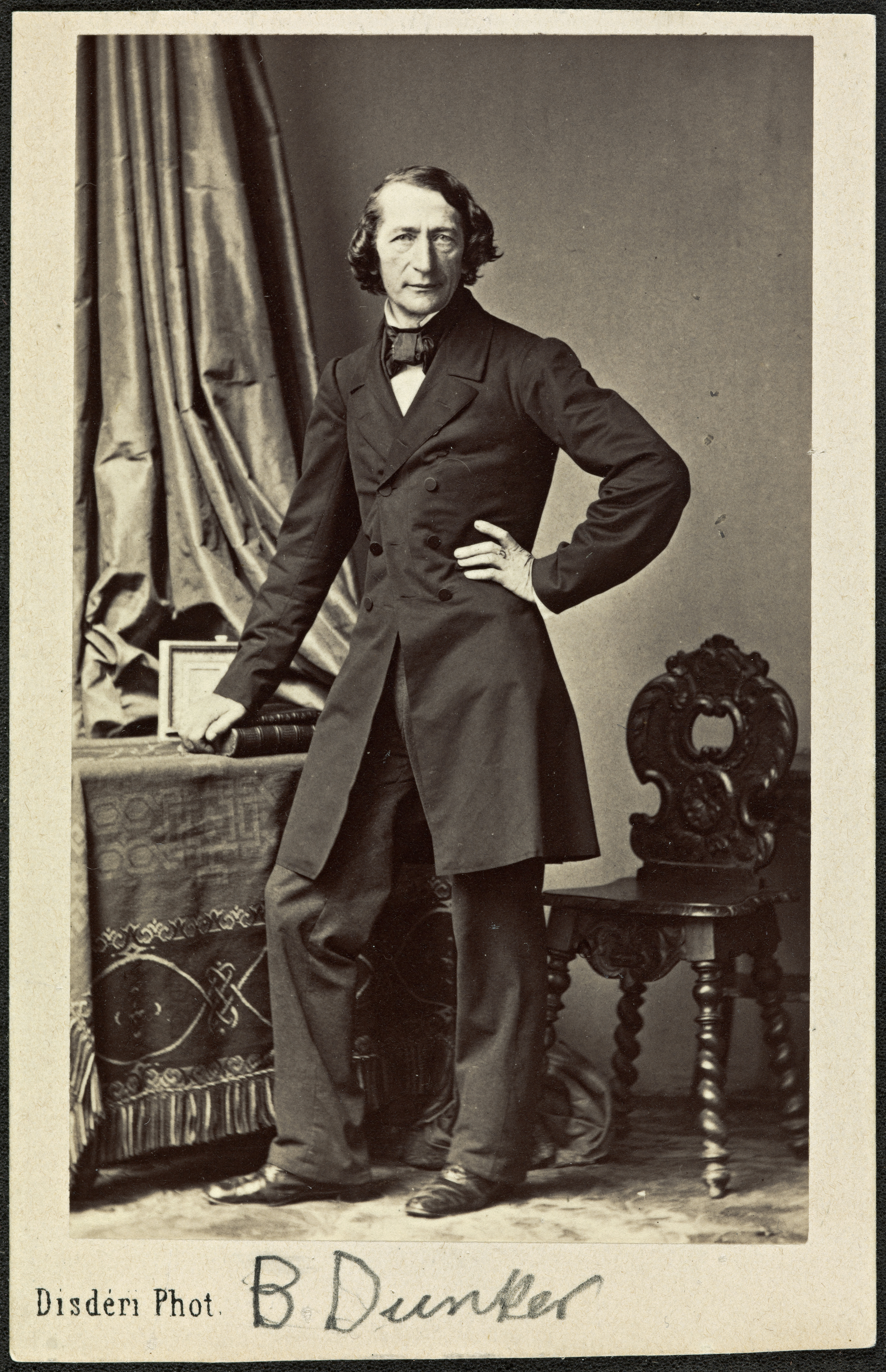
Dunker captured by André-Adolphe-Eugène Disdéri

Dunker was barrister with access to work with the Supreme Court from 1841. Among his more than 800 court cases, the trial against Marcus Thrane and his supporters is probably best known, when Bunker defended their demands for right to vote and political rights. He served as Attorney General of Norway from 1859 to 1870. His written works include Om den norske Constitution (1845), Om Revision af Foreningsakten mellem Sverige og Norge and Reise til Tellemarken og til Arendal sommeren 1852. He chaired the board of Christiania Theatre from 1860 to 1863, and again from 1865 to 1866.

He was decorated Knight of the Order of St. Olav in 1860, and was Knight of the Order of the Polar Star.

== In literature ==
The barrister "Berent" in Bjørnstjerne Bjørnson's play En Fallit is modelled after Dunker, and Bjørnson also wrote the poem "Til Regjeringsadvokat Dunker" dedicated to him.

Legal offices
Preceded by Jacob Worm Skjelderup	Attorney General of Norway; 1859–1870	Succeeded by Hans Christian Harboe Grønn
