= Vilhelmine Ullmann =

Norwegian pedagogue, publicist, literary critic and proponent for women's rights

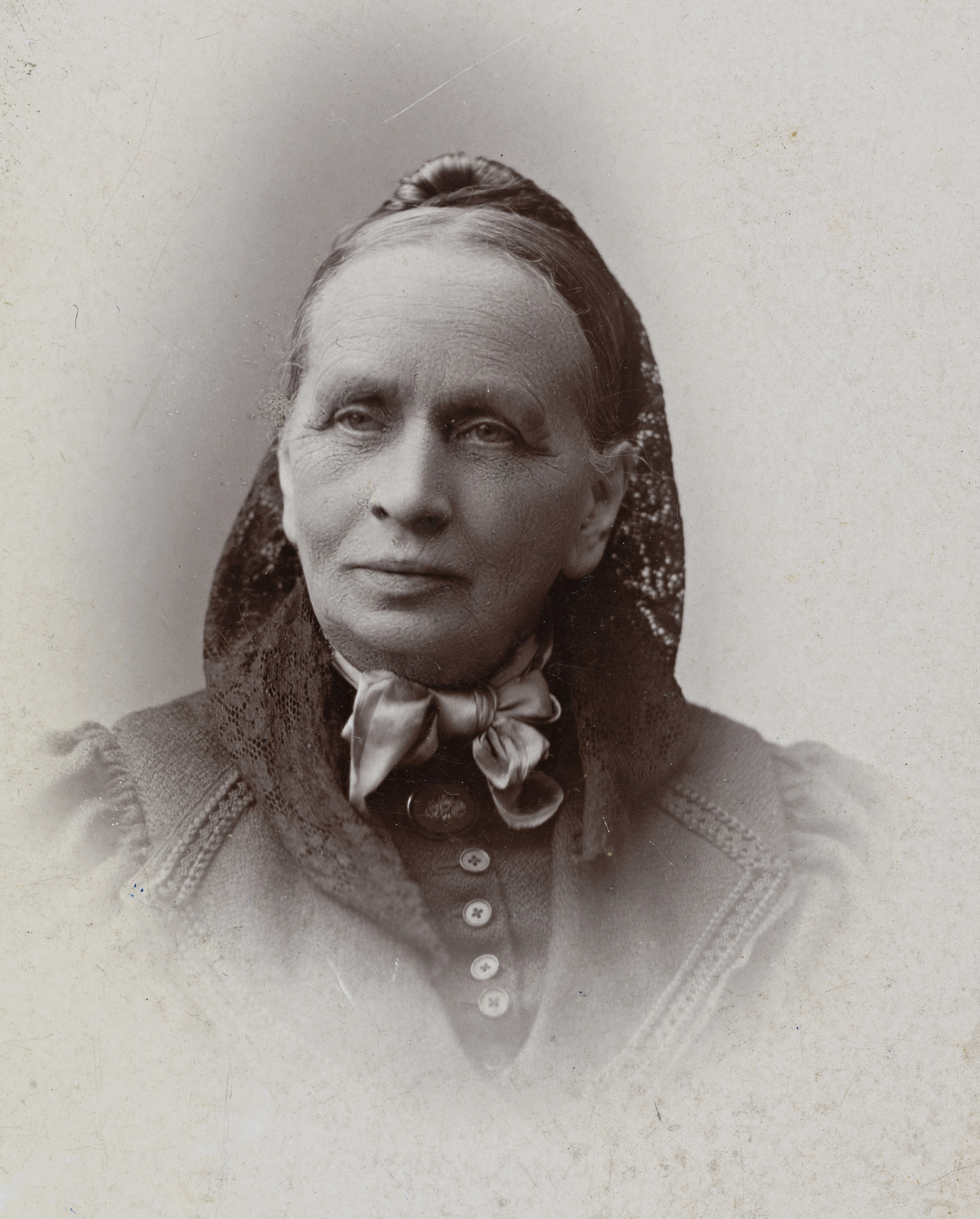
- Born: Cathrine Johanne Fredrikke Vilhelmine Dunker; 16 March 1816; Christiania, Norway
- Died: 28 April 1915 (aged 99); Kristiania
- Occupations: Pedagogue; Publicist; Literary critic
- Known for: Proponent for women's rights
- Children: Ragna Nielsen; Viggo Ullmann
- Parent: Conradine Birgitte Dunker
- Relatives: Bernhard Dunker (brother); Christopher Hansteen (uncle); Aasta Hansteen (cousin); Mathilde Schjøtt (niece)

Vilhelmine Ullmann (née Dunker; 16 March 1816 – 28 April 1915) was a Norwegian pedagogue, publicist, literary critic and proponent for women's rights.

== Early and personal life ==
Ullmann was born in Christiania (now Oslo), Norway. She was the daughter of socialite Conradine Birgitte Hansteen and Johan Friedrich Wilhelm Dunker. She was the sister of Bernhard Dunker, who served as Attorney General of Norway.

Growing up in a home where her mother was running a private school for girls, Vilhelmine learned French and German language as a child. She was also a child actress, performing in Det Dramatiske Selskab in Christiania from the age of nine. She married Jørgen Nicolai Axel Ullmann in 1839. They had six children (five of them surviving), and separated in 1854. She was the mother of pedagogue and feminist Ragna Nielsen and educator and politician Viggo Ullmann.

== Career ==
From 1862 to 1894 Ullmann was running the children's institution Vaterland Børneasyl. She also translated children's stories from German into Norwegian language, and published poems and short stories in the magazine Nordisk illustreret Børneblad. She was a member of the Norwegian Association for Women's Rights from its foundation in 1884, and contributed to the feminist magazine Nylænde, where she wrote literary critics under the signature "M.D." She also wrote articles about women's conditions in the society. Her autobiography Fra Tyveaarene og lidt mere was published in 1903.
