= Romsås Church =

- Romsås kirke
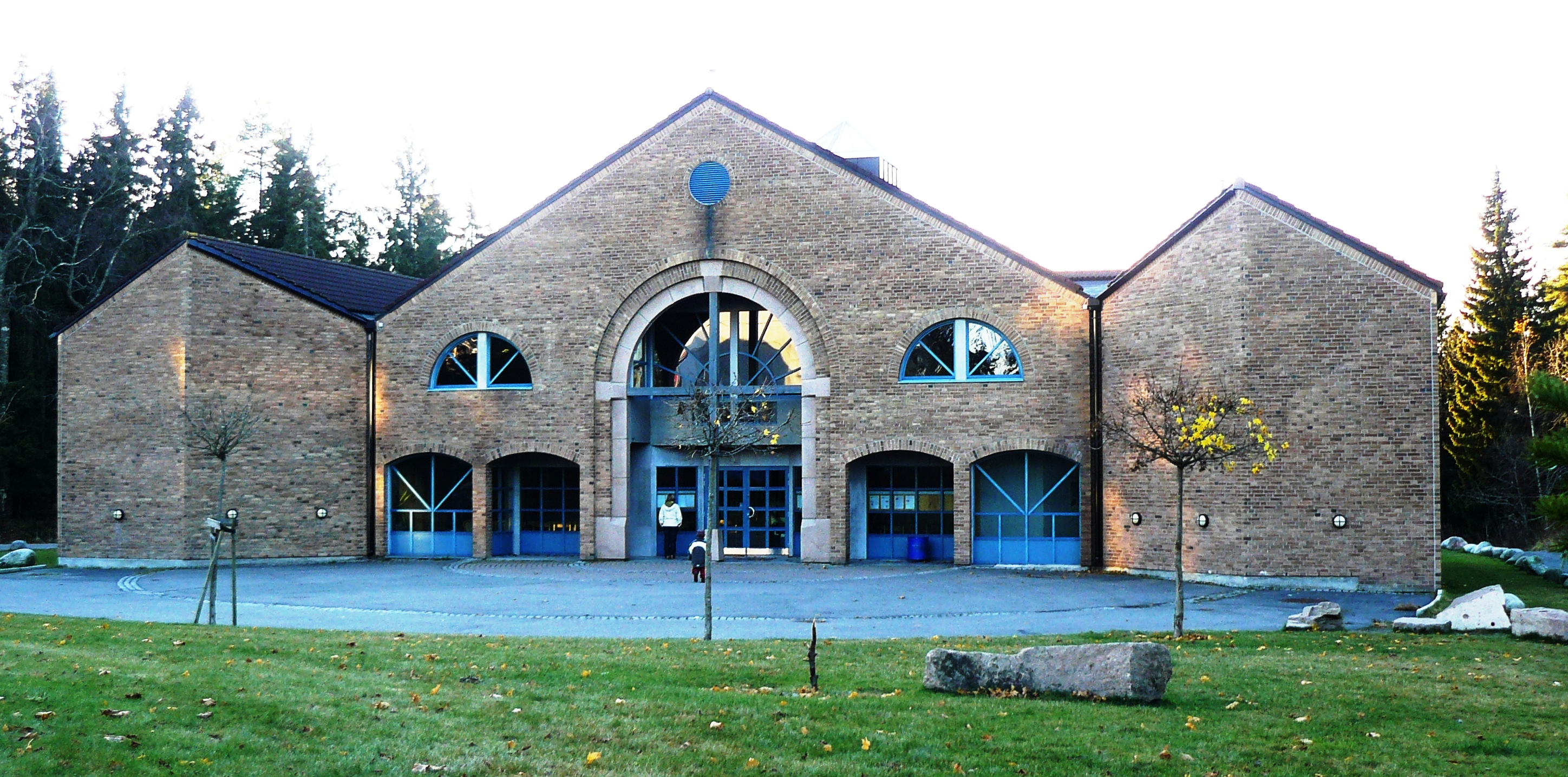
- Romsås Church
- 59°58′9″N 10°53′24″E
- Location: Ravnkollbakken 76; Romsås; Oslo,
- Country: Norway
- Denomination: Church of Norway
- Churchmanship: Evangelical Lutheran

History
- Status: Parish church
- Consecrated: 1995

Architecture
- Functional status: Active
- Style: Postmodernism

Specifications
- Capacity: 300
- Materials: Brick

Administration
- Diocese: Diocese of Oslo
- Deanery: Østre Aker
- Parish: Grorud

Romsås Church is a church in Oslo, Norway. The church is built of granite and yellow brick in a postmodern style and was consecrated in 1995. The former wooden church that stood on the same site burned to the ground in 1986.

The entrance is shaped like a large arch with a large wooden cross inside. The church room is fan-shaped. The altar in the church is shaped like a podium, raised a few steps above the rest of the church room. On each side of is a simple, modern pulpit. Both the baptismal font and altar are, presumably, made of local granite. On the altar itself is a crucifix, behind the altar is a large wooden cross. Other items in the church include a dove created by Nina Sundbye, and a large blanket made by local school children hangs over the entrance hall inside the church. The blanket shows the red thread over a thousand years from the ancient Moster Church to the new church at Romsås.

The church organ has 13 voices and was delivered by organ builder Ryde & Berg in Fredrikstad in the year 2000.

The separate bell tower with church bells is in brick.

Moving ground under the church has caused the walls to slip out, the floor has begun to sink and there are cracks between the floor and the walls.

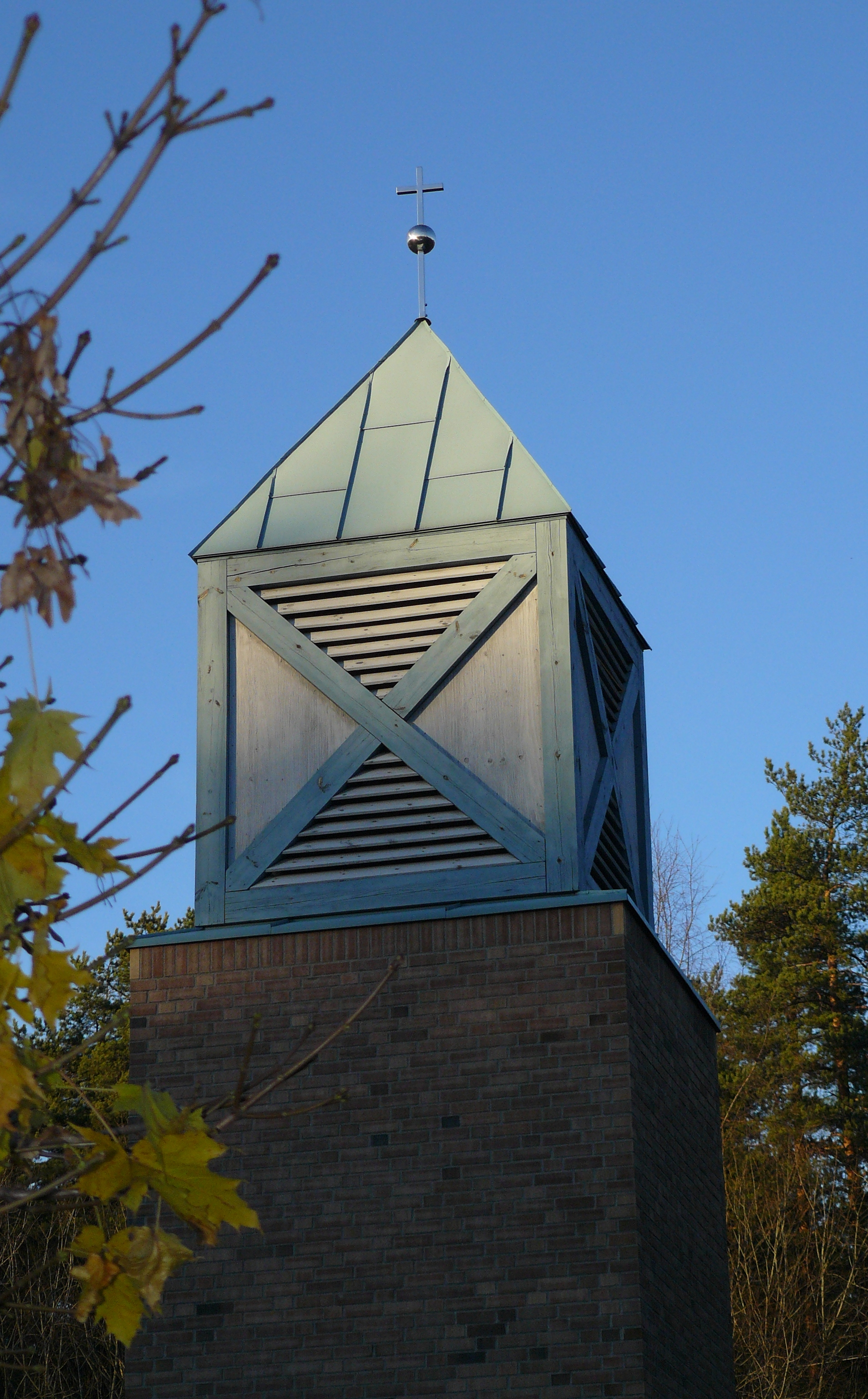
The bell tower
