= Steinar Schjøtt =

Norwegian educator, philologist and lexicographer

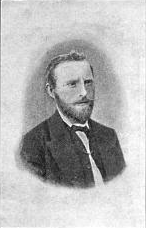
Steinar Schjøtt, 1872.

Steinar Schjøtt (13 November 1844 – 11 January 1920) was a Norwegian educator, philologist and lexicographer.

== Personal life ==
Steinar Schjøtt was born to priest and politician Ole Hersted Schjøtt (1805-1848) and his wife Anna Jacobine, née Olrog, in Porsgrund where his father was stationed as vicar. He was named Stener Johannes Stenersen Schjøtt after professor of theology Stener Johannes Stenersen. In 1845 the family moved to Skien. His older brother Peter Olrog Schjøtt became a politician and philology professor. From that marriage Steinar was brother-in-law of writer Mathilde Schjøtt and uncle of jurist Sofie Schjøtt.

== Career ==
Steinar Schjøtt enrolled at the University of Christiania (now University of Oslo) in 1862 and graduated as cand.mag. in 1870. He used eight languages in academics: Old Norse, Danish, German, English, French, Latin, Greek and of course Norwegian. Within the Norwegian language, he preferred the Landsmål form, hence he Norwegianized his name from the Dano-Norwegian Stener to Steinar.

He was not appointed to a university position, but worked as an upper secondary school teacher. He was a teacher at Heltberg Latin School (Heltbergs Studentfabrikk) which was operated by Henrik Heltberg (1806-1873) in Christiania (now Oslo). He then taught in Levanger and Kristiansand. From 1874-1893 he was a teacher in Fredrikshald, then in Skien (town).

He helped translating the Heimskringla to Landsmål, and published books in Norwegian and global history. He then published two large dictionaries in 1908 and 1914.
