= Christopher Hansteen (jurist) =

Norwegian politician

Christopher Hansteen (26 September 1822 – 10 March 1912) was a Norwegian judge. He served as an Associate Justice in the Supreme Court of Norway from 1867 to 1905, an unusually long period, and also spent a few years in politics.

== Personal life ==
He was born in Moss as the son of customs surveyor Nils Lynge Hansteen (1782–1861) and his wife Petronelle Severine Clementin (1787–1829). His brother Agathon Bartholomæus Hansteen was a priest and member of Parliament. In addition, he was a distant relative of Christopher Hansteen, the astronomer and more famous bearer of the name. In November 1853 he married Lagertha Cecilia Wulfsberg (1820–1897), a daughter of politician Gregers Winther Wulfsberg. Their son Albert Waldemar Hansteen became an architect, as did their grandson Valdemar Scheel Hansteen.

== Career ==
Hansteen grew up in Moss, Christiania and Drammen. He enrolled as a student in 1838, and graduated with the cand.jur. degree in 1843. He started a career as a civil servant, working as a clerk in the Ministry of Finance and Customs, the Ministry of the Interior and the Ministry of Justice and the Police. In 1854 he was promoted to subdirector, and from 1857 to 1866 he was a judge and acting stipendiary magistrate in Christiania.

Hansteen was also active in politics. He was a member of Christiania city council from 1867 to 1876, and following the 1868 election he was a deputy representative to the Norwegian Parliament, but without actually meeting in parliament. Political parties did not exist at the time, but Hansteen was known as a political conservative. He frequently used newspapers as an arena for promoting his views.

In 1867 he had been appointed as an Assessor in the Supreme Court of Norway. As such he took part in the Impeachment trial, where members of the Supreme Court as well as politicians from the Lagting ultimately impeached Conservative Prime Minister Christian Selmer and his cabinet. Hansteen largely let his professionalism subdue his political leanings in this case, which could not be taken for granted in the political climate of the time.

In 1886, when Iver Steen Thomle stepped down as Chief Justice of the Supreme Court of Norway, Hansteen had expressed a strong interest in the position. However, the Liberal cabinet led by Johan Sverdrup chose not to appoint him, probably due to Hansteen's political color. Later, when the Liberals had lost their majority, Hansteen was asked by King Oscar II of Sweden and Norway to become Prime Minister and form a cabinet of his own in 1892; contrary to popular belief, parliamentarism was not fully implemented in Norway yet. This time, Hansteen himself declined due to his relatively old age. He continued as a judge until his retirement in 1905. His 38 years in Supreme Court was a record at the time. He lived almost to the age of ninety, dying in March 1912 in Kristiania.

Hansteen was decorated as a Knight of the Order of St. Olav in 1868. He became a Commander, First Class of the same order in 1882, and in 1895 he received the Grand Cross.
