= Sofie Schjøtt =

Norwegian jurist

- Born: 11 August 1871; Aker, Norway
- Died: 20 January 1950 (aged 78); Oslo
- Occupation: Jurist
- Parent(s): Peter Olrog Schjøtt; Mathilde Schjøtt
- Relatives: Bernhard Dunker (grandfather); Conradine Birgitte Dunker (great-grandmother); Steinar Schjøtt (uncle); Ole Hersted Schjøtt (grandfather)

Sofie Schjøtt (11 August 1871 – 20 January 1950) was a Norwegian jurist.

== Early life ==
She was born in Aker to Peter Olrog Schjøtt and Mathilde Dunker. She was a granddaughter of Bernhard Dunker, and a great-granddaughter of Conradine Birgitte Dunker.

== Career ==
Schjøtt was among the first female jurists in Norway. She had a long career in the Ministry of Defence, and was later a judge in Oslo.
