= Christopher Hansteen =

Norwegian geomagnetist

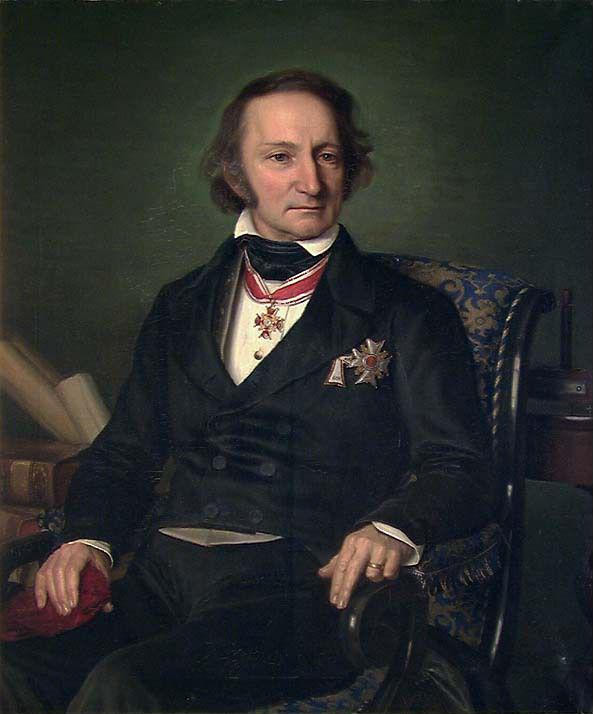
- Portrait by Aasta Hansteen
- Born: 26 November 1784; Christiania (Oslo)
- Died: 11 April 1873 (aged 88); Kristiania (Oslo)
- Education: University of Copenhagen
- Scientific career
- Fields: astronomy, mathematics, magnetism, mechanics
- Workplaces: Royal Frederick University (1814–1861)

Christopher Hansteen (26 September 1784 – 11 April 1873) was a Norwegian geophysicist, astronomer and physicist, best known for his mapping of Earth's magnetic field.

== Early life and career ==
Hansteen was born in Christiania as the son of Johannes Mathias Hansteen (1744–1792) and his wife Anne Cathrine Treschow (1754–1829). He was the younger brother of the writer Conradine Birgitte Dunker, and through her the uncle of Bernhard Dunker and Vilhelmine Ullmann, and granduncle of Mathilde Schjøtt, Ragna Nielsen and Viggo Ullmann. His mother was a first cousin of Niels Treschow.

The intention was for Hansteen to become a naval officer, but since his father died when Hansteen was young, this plan did not materialize. Instead, he attended Oslo Cathedral School from the age of nine. Niels Treschow was the principal of this school. Hansteen took the examen artium in 1802, and in 1803 he enrolled at the University of Copenhagen, where he originally studied law. He later took more interest in mathematics, estranged by the lack of universal validity of a country's laws compared to the mathematical laws. He had also been inspired by the lectures of Hans Christian Ørsted. He was hired as the tutor of a young noble, Niels Rosenkrantz von Holstein, who lived at Sorø. Here, he also met his future wife Johanne Cathrine Andrea Borch, a daughter of professor Caspar Abraham Borch. In 1806 he was hired as a mathematics teacher in the gymnasium of Frederiksborg.

== Academic career ==
In 1807 Hansteen began the inquiries in terrestrial magnetism with which his name is especially associated. His first scientific publication was printed in Journal de Physique, following a contest on magnetic axes created in 1811 by the Royal Danish Academy of Sciences and Letters. In 1813 he was given a research scholarship by the recently established (in 1811) Royal Frederick University in Christiania, with a promise of a future academic position. After marrying Johanne Cathrine Andrea Borch in May 1814, they left for Norway in the summer. Due to the Swedish campaign against Norway in 1814, they opted to travel by sea, and were threatened by a Swedish privateer as well as seized by a British frigate en route. Reaching Norway after five days, they settled in the street Pilestredet.

Working as a lecturer from 1814, in 1816 Hansteen was promoted to professor of astronomy and applied mathematics. He was the editor of the official Norwegian almanac from 1815, manager of the city astronomical observatory from the same year and co-director of the Norwegian Mapping Authority (then known as Norges Geografiske Oppmåling) from 1817. In 1819 he published a volume of researches on terrestrial magnetism, which was translated into German under the title of Untersuchungen über den Magnetismus der Erde, with a supplement containing Beobachtungen der Abweichung und Neigung der Magnetnadel and an atlas. By the rules there framed for the observation of magnetical phenomena Hansteen hoped to accumulate analyses for determining the number and position of the magnetic poles of the Earth. In 1822 he co-founded Norway's first journal on natural sciences, Magazin for Naturvidenskaberne. He sat as editor-in-chief for eight years.

In the course of his research he travelled over Finland and the greater part of his own country; and from 1828 to 1830 he undertook, in company with Georg Adolf Erman and with the co-operation of Russia, a government-funded mission to Western Siberia. A narrative of the expedition soon appeared (Reise-Erinnerungen aus Siberien, 1854; Souvenirs d'un voyage en Sibérie, 1857); but the chief work was not issued until 1863 (Resultate magnetischer Beobachtungen). He did not resolve the issue at hand, but his work was later completed by Carl Friedrich Gauss. Shortly after the return of the mission, in 1833 Hansteen moved with his family into the observatory, which was created from drawings by the architect Christian Heinrich Grosch. A magnetic observatory was added in 1839.

From 1835 to 1838 he published textbooks on geometry and mechanics, largely a reaction to his former research assistant Bernt Michael Holmboe's textbooks. Compared to Holmboe's method of teaching, Hansteen's books were more practically oriented. After Holmboe wrote a review of the first textbook for the newspaper Morgenbladet, in which he advised schools not to use it, a public debate followed, with contributions from other mathematicians. It has been claimed that this was the first debate on the subject of school textbooks in Norway. Holmboe's textbooks proved more lasting, with Hansteen's textbook not being reprinted. In 1842 Hansteen wrote his Disquisitiones de mutationibus, quas patitur momentum acus magneticae. He also contributed various papers to different scientific journals, especially Magazin for Naturvidenskaberne.

Hansteen was a member of the Royal Norwegian Society of Sciences and Letters from 1818 and of the Norwegian Academy of Science and Letters from 1857, as well as several learned societies in other countries, including the Royal Swedish Academy of Sciences (1822) and a Foreign Honorary Member of the American Academy of Arts and Sciences (1863). He was a member of the board of the Royal Norwegian Society for Development for many years, and also chaired the board of the Norwegian National Academy of Craft and Art Industry.

== Later life ==
For health reasons, Hansteen stopped holding lectures in 1856. In 1861 he retired from active work, but still pursued his studies, his Observations de l'inclination magnetique and Sur les variations séculaires du magnetisme appearing in 1865. He left the position as observatory manager in 1861 as well, but continued as editor of the Norwegian almanac until 1863 and as director of the Norwegian Mapping Authority until 1872.

His wife died in 1840. Their daughter Aasta Hansteen became a notable women's rights campaigner. He was the paternal great-grandfather of Kristofer Hansteen and Edvard Heiberg Hansteen; trade unionist Viggo Hansteen was a later descendant. Christopher Hansteen died in April 1873 in Christiania, and is buried at Gamle Aker kirkegård. The funeral took place at the university.

== Awards and legacy ==
Hansteen was appointed a Commander of the Royal Norwegian Order of St. Olav in 1847, and received the Grand Cross in 1855. He was also appointed a Grand Cross of the Order of the Dannebrog and a Commander Grand Cross of the Order of the Polar Star, as well as other foreign orders of knighthood. A bust of Hansteen was raised at his observatory in the 1850s.

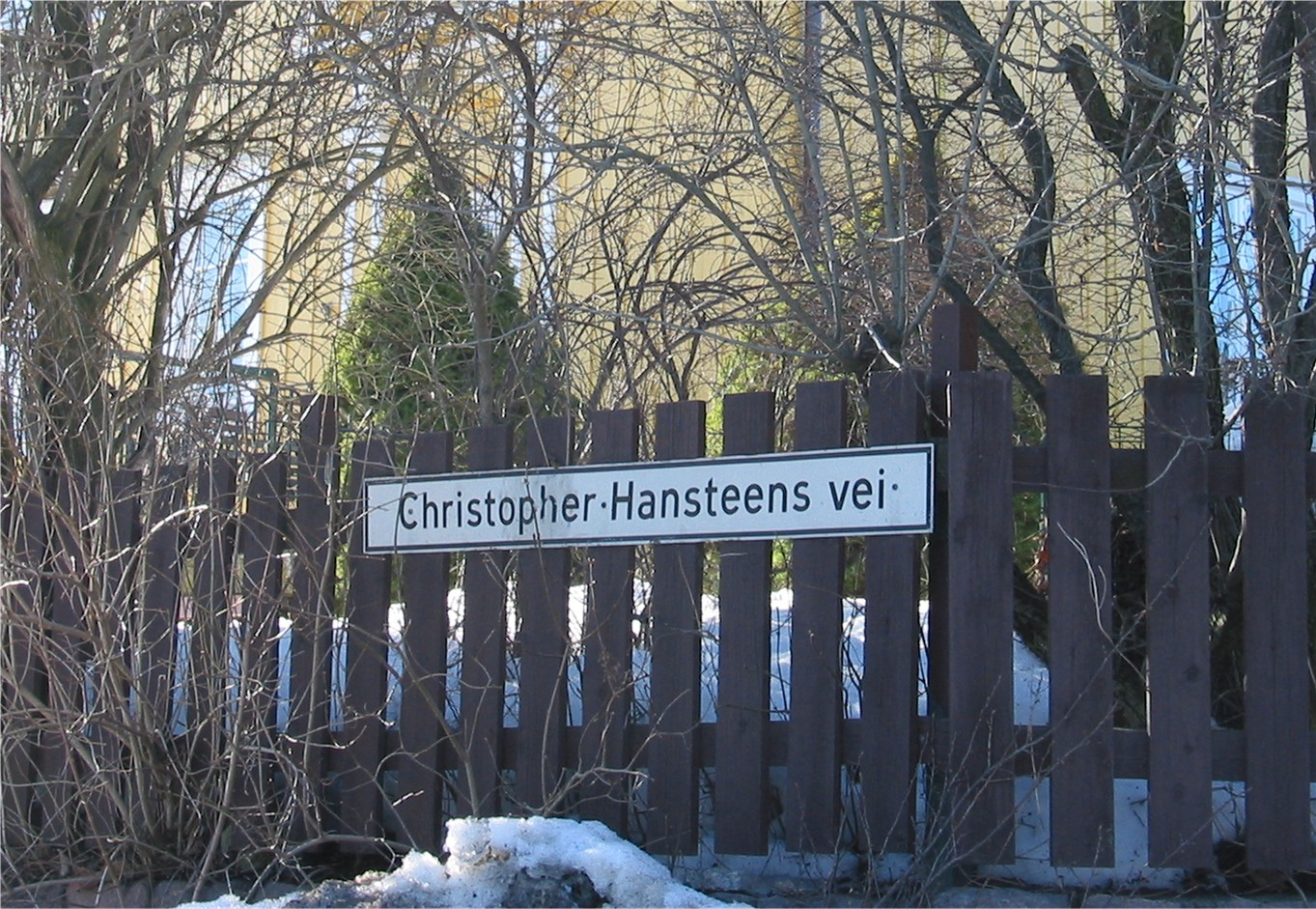
Christopher Hansteens vei.

The crater Hansteen and the mountain Mons Hansteen on the Moon are named after him. In Oslo, the road Christopher Hansteens vei at Blindern has been named after Hansteen. In addition, a street at Majorstuen was named Hansteens gate, but in 1879 it was renamed Holmboes gate in honour of Bernt Michael Holmboe. In the Møhlenpris neighbourhood in Bergen, the street Professor Hansteens gate was named after Hansteen in 1881.

== See also ==
- Scandinavian Scientist Conference
