= Stovner Church =

- Stovner kirke
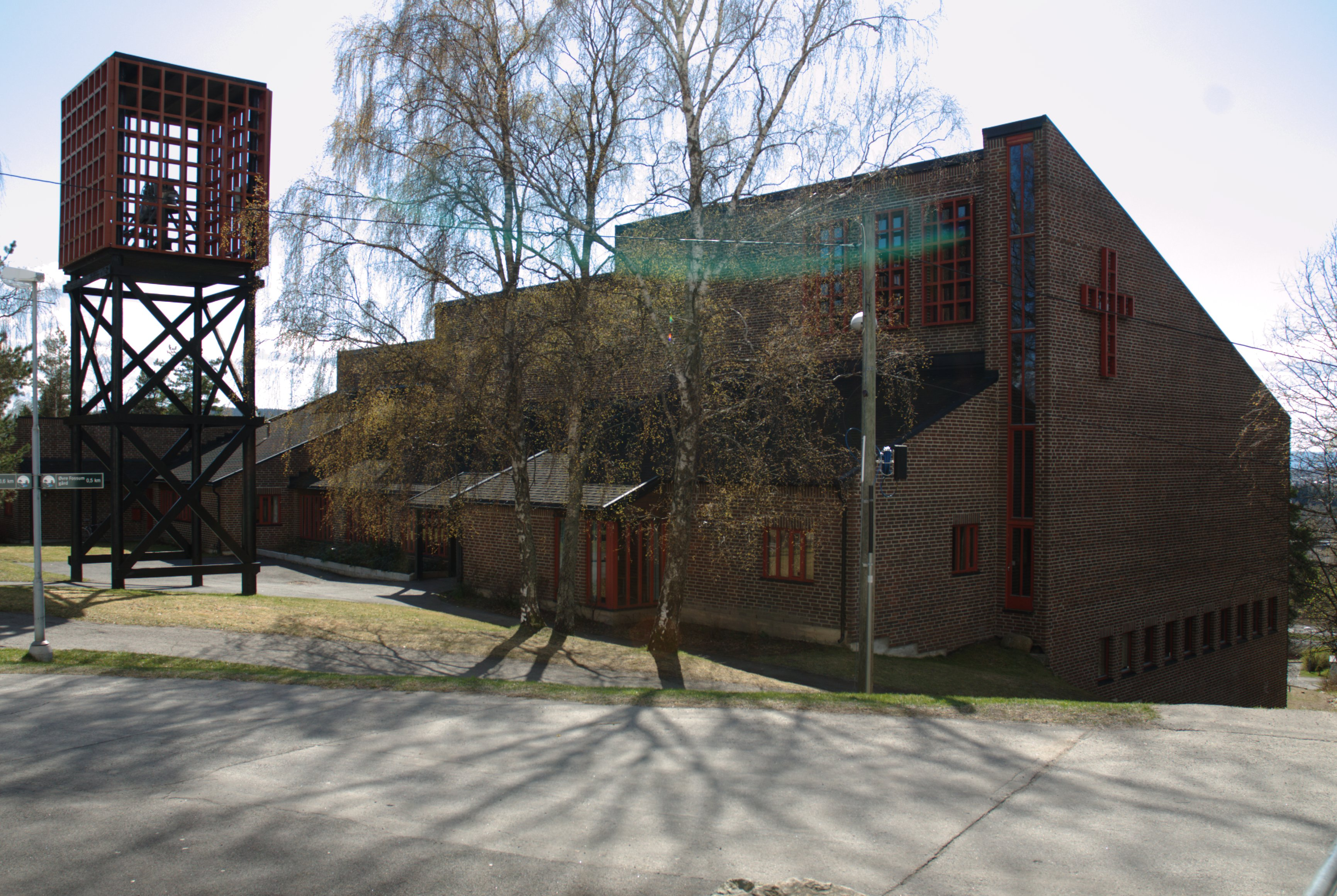
- Stovner Church
- 59°57′20.232″N 10°55′34.158″E
- Location: Stovnerfaret 25, Stovner, Oslo,
- Country: Norway
- Denomination: Church of Norway
- Churchmanship: Evangelical Lutheran
- Website: https://kirken.no

History
- Status: Parish church
- Consecrated: 1979

Architecture
- Functional status: Active
- Architect: Harald Hille

Specifications
- Capacity: 600
- Materials: Brick

Administration
- Diocese: Diocese of Oslo
- Deanery: Østre Aker
- Parish: Høybråten, Fossum og Stovner

Stovner Church is a church center in Oslo, Norway.

The church was consecrated in 1979. It has 210 seats in the church room and 250 in the congregation hall, as well as a church hall and a baptismal room furnished respectively for 40 and 60 people. Sliding doors allow these rooms to be joined together. There is also a vestibule for socializing.

The altarpiece in the church room is a bronze relief depicting the Ascension of Christ, created by Nina Sundbye in 1979. It is located a piece up on the foundation wall behind the altar. The pulpit and the baptismal font are both designed by the architect. Three tapestries by Rigmor Bové are from 1993. The church organ is from 1981 and was built by Jehmlich Orgelbau in Dresden, Germany.

The two church bells are cast by Olsen Nauen Bell Foundry and hang in a separate bell tower.

Stovner Church is listed by the Norwegian Directorate for Cultural Heritage.
