= Mons Hansteen =

Mountain on the Moon

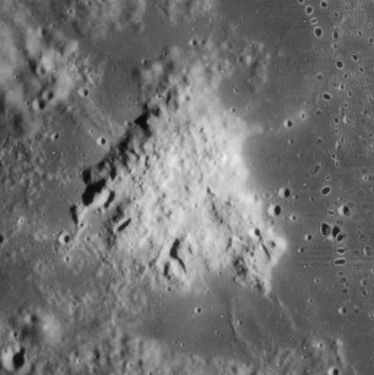
- The triangular arrow-like shape of Mons Hansteen is noticeable in this Lunar Orbiter 4 image.

Highest point
- Listing: Lunar mountains
- Coordinates: 12.1°S 50.0°W

Naming
- English translation: Hansteen mountain
- Language of name: Latin

Geography
- Location: Near side of the Moon

Geology
- Mountain type: Lunar dome

Mons Hansteen is a mountain on the Moon, also known as Hansteen Alpha (α), named after Christopher Hansteen, and the Arrow. It is roughly triangular in shape and occupies an area about 30 km across on the western margin of Oceanus Procellarum, southeast of the crater Hansteen and north of the dark-floored crater Billy. It is thought to be an extrusion of volcanic material that is younger than the crater Hansteen, with most of surface volcanic ash been deposited 3.5-3.74 billion years ago.

The Mons Hansteen belongs to rare class of non-mare moon volcanoes.

== Composition ==
The extruded material is significantly enriched in silica, and strongly depleted in iron and titanium oxides compared to surrounding mare terrain. Initially, it was believed its lavas are not as evolved as in Compton–Belkovich Thorium Anomaly, but by 2004 the low thorium enrichment signal was attributed to small size of volcanic complex, making it composition compatible with highly processed silicic lavas. By 2013, a patchy deposits of magnesium spinel were detected in the central and western parts of the volcanic dome. The spinel-rich areas are associated with boulder fields, and fringed by areas showing a sign of hydration, with 4-8% of mineral by weight been hydroxylated.

The average bulk density of material in Mons Hansteen is extremely low, been equal only to 1500–2000 kg/m^{3}.

== Albedo contrast - Mons Hansteen and Billy ==
Observers of the full moon and last quarter moon know the albedo contrast of Mons Hansteen and crater Billy immediately south of it. The brightness of Mons Hansteen and the darkness of Billy are also noticeable on the photographic versions of charts LAC 74 (page 148) and LAC 75 (page 150) in The Clementine Atlas of the Moon (Ben Bussey / Paul D. Spudis).

== See also ==
- Volcanism on the Moon
