= Billy (crater) =

Crater on the Moon

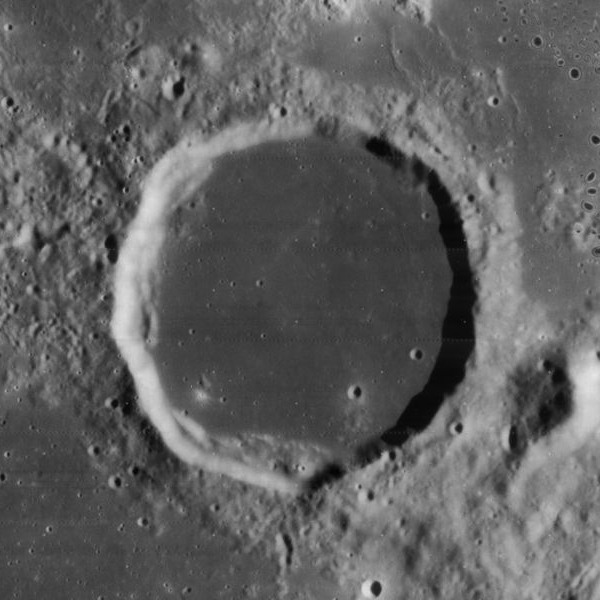
- Lunar Orbiter 4 image (spots at upper right are blemishes on original)
- Coordinates: 13.8°S 50.1°W
- Diameter: 45.57 km (28.32 mi)
- Depth: 1.2 km (0.75 mi)
- Colongitude: 50° at sunrise
- Formation: Nectarian or Early Imbrian
- Eponym: Jacques de Billy

Billy is a lunar impact crater that is located at the southern fringes of the Oceanus Procellarum, in the western hemisphere of the Moon. It lies to the southeast of the similar-sized crater Hansteen, and west-southwest of the similar-sized flooded Letronne.

The interior floor of Billy has been flooded by basaltic lava, leaving a dark surface due to the low albedo. This feature makes it easier to identify under high illumination. The portion of the rim remaining above the surface is narrow and low, with a thin inner wall that is somewhat polygonal in outline. Only a few tiny craterlets mark the interior, with a pair in the southern half showing gray ejecta collars.

This formation dates to 3.88 ga, placing it in the Nectarian or Early Imbrian epoch of the lunar geologic timescale, with the resurfacing event occurring at 3.86 ga. The ejecta blanket surrounding Billy is relatively rich in FeO and TiO_{2}. To the north of the crater is a triangular mountainous formation named Mons Hansteen, after the nearby crater. Southeast of Billy is a rille, designated Rima Billy, that runs 70 kilometers to the south.

This crater was named after French mathematician Jacques de Billy (1602–1679). The name was incorporated into lunar nomenclature by Italian astronomer Giovanni Riccioli in 1651. Its designation was formally adopted by the International Astronomical Union in 1935.

== Albedo contrast - Billy and Mons Hansteen ==
Observers of the full moon and last quarter moon know the albedo contrast of crater Billy and Mons Hansteen immediately north of it. The darkness of Billy and the brightness of Mons Hansteen are also noticeable on the photographic versions of charts LAC 74 (page 148) and LAC 75 (page 150) in The Clementine Atlas of the Moon (Ben Bussey / Paul D. Spudis).

== Satellite craters ==
By convention these features are identified on lunar maps by placing the letter on the side of the crater midpoint that is closest to Billy.

Billy	Latitude	Longitude	Diameter
A	14.3° S	46.3° W	7 km
B	12.2° S	47.6° W	25 km
C	16.1° S	49.0° W	6 km
D	14.9° S	48.3° W	11 km
E	15.0° S	49.6° W	2 km
H	15.6° S	49.6° W	3 km
K	12.9° S	48.7° W	4 km
