= Agathon Bartholomæus Hansteen =

Norwegian politician

Agathon Bartholomæus Hansteen (23 September 1812 – 30 April 1895) was a Norwegian priest and politician.

He was born in Moss as a son of merchant Nils Lynge Hansteen (1782–1861) and Severine Petronelle née Clementin. His brother Christopher Hansteen became a Supreme Court justice.

After finishing his secondary education in 1830, he graduated from university with the cand.theol. degree in 1835. Following a period as a teacher at Trondhjem Cathedral School, he became vicar in Mo in 1843. From 1852 he doubled as vicar as well as dean of Nordre Helgeland. He was elected a representative to the Parliament of Norway from Nordlands amt in 1850 and 1853, and was also elected as a deputy representative in 1859.

From 1861 to his retirement in 1886 he was the vicar of Selbu. Here, he also served in the municipal council, including a stint as mayor in 1872–1873. He was married twice. He was the father of Nils Severin Lynge Hansteen, a painter, and an uncle of the architect Albert Waldemar Hansteen. Agathon Bartholomæus died in Trondhjem, aged 82.
