= Aasta Hansteen spar =

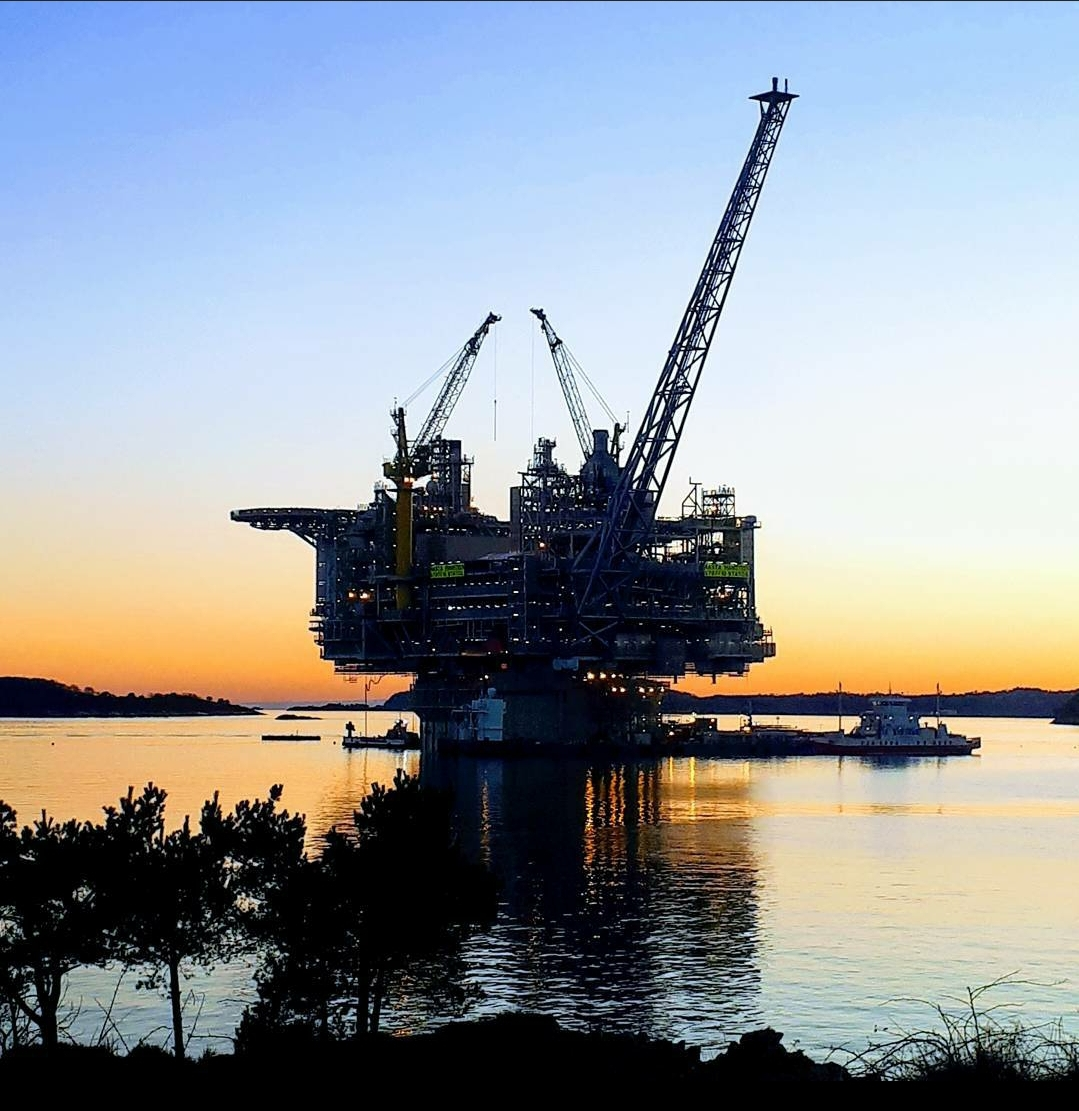
Aasta Hansteen in Digernessundet outside Stord during the inshore hook-up phase in 2018.

The Aasta Hansteen spar is a floating production storage and offloading (FPSO) unit for natural gas operated by Equinor located 186 miles offshore in the Norwegian Sea. It is the first spar platform to be located on the Norwegian continental shelf (NCS). The Aasta Hansteen spar is named after Norwegian painter, writer and early feminist Aasta Hansteen.

== Design ==
The Aasta Hansteen platform is a truss spar type allowing condensate to be stored in the hull below sea level and offloaded to a shuttle tanker. The produced gas is exported to the shore with steel catenary risers (SCR). The production risers are also SCRs, with these being the first time SCRs have been used in the Norwegian Sea.

The spar hull was designed by Technip, with the topsides being designed by CB&I, with both being fabricated by Hyundai Heavy Industries in South Korea before being transported to Norway for installation. Once on site it was partially submerged by filling ballast tanks to 177 m and anchored to the seabed, leaving only the top 21 m above the surface. The seabed moorings are primarily made of cut resistant polyester and steel chain.

At a height of 198 m (of which 177 m will be submerged) and a diameter of 50 m it is the biggest spar platform hull ever built in terms of diameter and displacement. The total height of the platform including the topsides is 339 m, exceeding the height of the Eiffel Tower.

The Aasta Hansteen spar exports the natural gas from the field through the Polarled pipeline to the Nyhamna processing plant on the Norwegian coast. The project cost approximately 37.5 billion NOK.

== Transport and installation ==
The Aasta Hansteen spar was built on its side in the dry dock on barges. Once built it was floated off the barges and then floated onto the heavy transport ship Dockwise Vanguard and shipped to a fjord near Stord Municipality in Western Norway. The spar was upended in the fjord, after which the topsides were installed using the floatover technique. It was then towed vertically to the Aasta Hansteen gas field 300 kilometres (190 mi) off Bodø at the northwest coast of Norway. The spar is moored north of the Arctic Circle using polyester moorings to the seabed 1,200 metres (3,900 ft) below.

The Aasta Hansteen began producing on 16 December 2018.

== Aasta Hansteen gas field ==
Originally called the Luva gas field and later renamed after Aasta Hansteen, it was discovered in 1997, approximately 300 km off the coast of Norway. The production from the surrounding Luva, Haklang and Snefrid Sør and Nord gas fields are tied in to the platform, as will future fields already discovered, including Irpa (formerly Asterix). Future expansion of additional risers and topsides facility are built-in in the design of the platform. The field is located north of the Arctic Circle, and is subject to short daylight and freezing temperatures in the winter months.
