= Ole Hersted Schjøtt =

Norwegian clergyman and politician

Ole Hersted Schjøtt (1805-1848) was a Norwegian clergyman and politician.

== Personal life ==
Ole Hersted Schjøtt was born in 1805 to shipmaster Niels M. Schjøtt and his wife Anne Hersted. The family moved from their native Jutland to Christiania in 1808.

In 1828 he married Anna Jacobine Olrog, daughter of Peter Olrog and his wife Margarete, née Gluckstadt. Their most prominent children were Peter Olrog Schjøtt, who became professor in Greek language, and philologist Steinar Schjøtt. He was born Stener Johannes Stenersen Schjøtt, named after professor of theology Stener Johannes Stenersen, but later adhered to Landsmål and Norwegianized his name.

== Career ==
Schjøtt enrolled at the University of Christiania in 1822 and graduated as cand.theol. in 1827. He was appointed vicar in Hegeborstad parish in 1829. He later became vicar in Dybvaag in 1832, Porsgrund in 1839 and Skien in 1845. He stayed in this position until his death in 1848.

As a politician, Ole Hersted Schjøtt was elected mayor of Porsgrunn Municipality for the year 1842. He held the position of vice mayor in 1841, 1843 and 1844. He was among the founders of the first temperance society in Porsgrund, named the Porsgrunds Forening mod Brændevins-Drik, founded in December 1845 with Schjøtt as chairman.
