= Peter Olrog Schjøtt =

Norwegian philologist and politician (1833–1926)

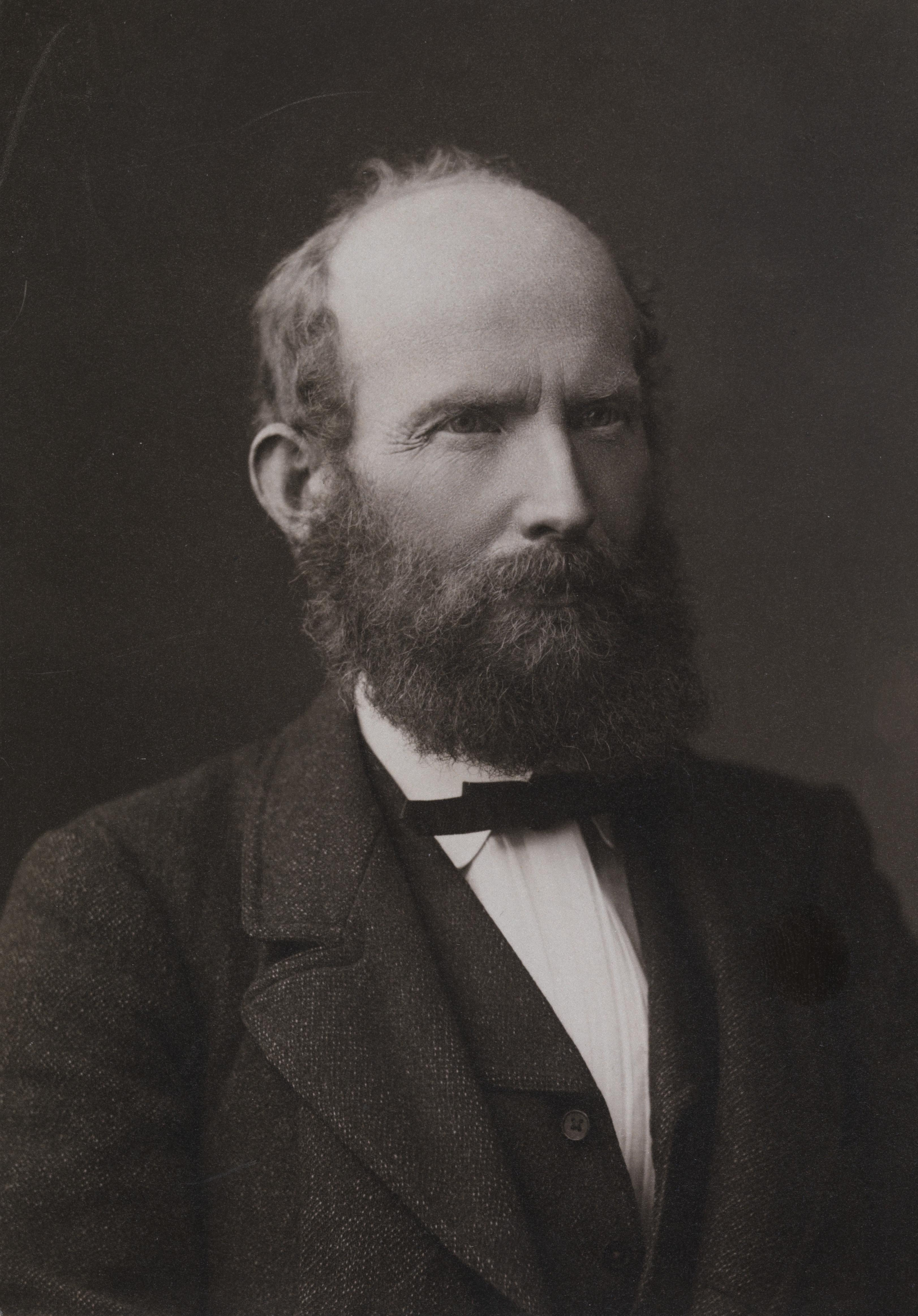

56th Minister of Auditing
- In office February 1889 – Summer 1889
- Monarch: Oscar II
- Prime Minister: Johan Sverdrup
- Preceded by: Lars Knutson Liestøl
- Succeeded by: Emil Stang

41st Minister of Finance
- In office 1 May 1889 – 8 July 1889
- Monarch: Oscar II
- Prime Minister: Johan Sverdrup
- Preceded by: Olaj Olsen
- Succeeded by: Olaj Olsen

Personal details
- Born: 29 July 1833 Dybvaag, Norway
- Died: 7 January 1926 (aged 92) Oslo, Norway
- Party: Liberal Party
- Spouse: Mathilde Dunker (m. 1867)
- Children: 1 (Sofie)
- Parent: Ole Hersted Schjøtt (father)
- Relatives: Steinar Schjøtt (brother)

Peter Olrog Schjøtt (29 July 1833 – 7 January 1926) was a Norwegian classical philologist and politician.

== Personal life ==
Peter Olrog Schjøtt was born in 1833 to priest and politician Ole Hersted Schjøtt (1805–1848) and his wife Anna Jacobine, née Olrog, in Dybvaag where his father was stationed as vicar. He was named after his maternal grandfather Peter Olrog. He was the brother of philologist Steinar Schjøtt, who was born Stener Johannes Stenersen Schjøtt, named after professor of theology Stener Johannes Stenersen, but later adhered to Landsmål and Norwegianized his name.

Peter Olrog Schjøtt married Mathilde (1844–1926) from Christiania, philologist and daughter of noted jurist Bernhard Dunker. Their most prominent child was jurist Sofie Schjøtt.

== Career ==
An academic, Schjøtt was appointed acting lector in Greek philology at the University of Christiania in May 1865. In January 1866 he was given a permanent position as lector, and in June the same year he was promoted to professor. He left in March 1888.

He then embarked on a political career, representing the Liberal Party. He was a member of the Council of State Division in Stockholm from 13 March 1888 to 1 August 1888, Minister of the Interior from 1 August 1888 to 28 August 1888, member of the Council of State Division again from 30 August 1888 to 1 February 1889, and then Minister of Auditing from 23 February 1889 to 13 July 1889. Within the last period he was also Minister of Finance and Customs from 1 May 1889 to 6 June 1889.

In July 1889 he returned to his professorship, this time expanded to the field of classical philology, at the University of Kristiania. He retired in April 1918. He died in that city on 7 January 1926.

Preceded by Walter Scott Dahl	Minister of the Interior; 1 August 1888–28 August 1888	Succeeded by Oscar Jacobsen
Preceded by Lars Knutson Liestøl	Minister of Auditing; February 1889–July 1889	Succeeded by Emil Stang
Preceded by Olaj Olsen	Minister of Finance and Customs; May 1889–June 1889	Succeeded by Edvard Hagerup Bull (acting)
