= Dypvåg Church =

Church in Agder, Norway

- Dypvåg kirke
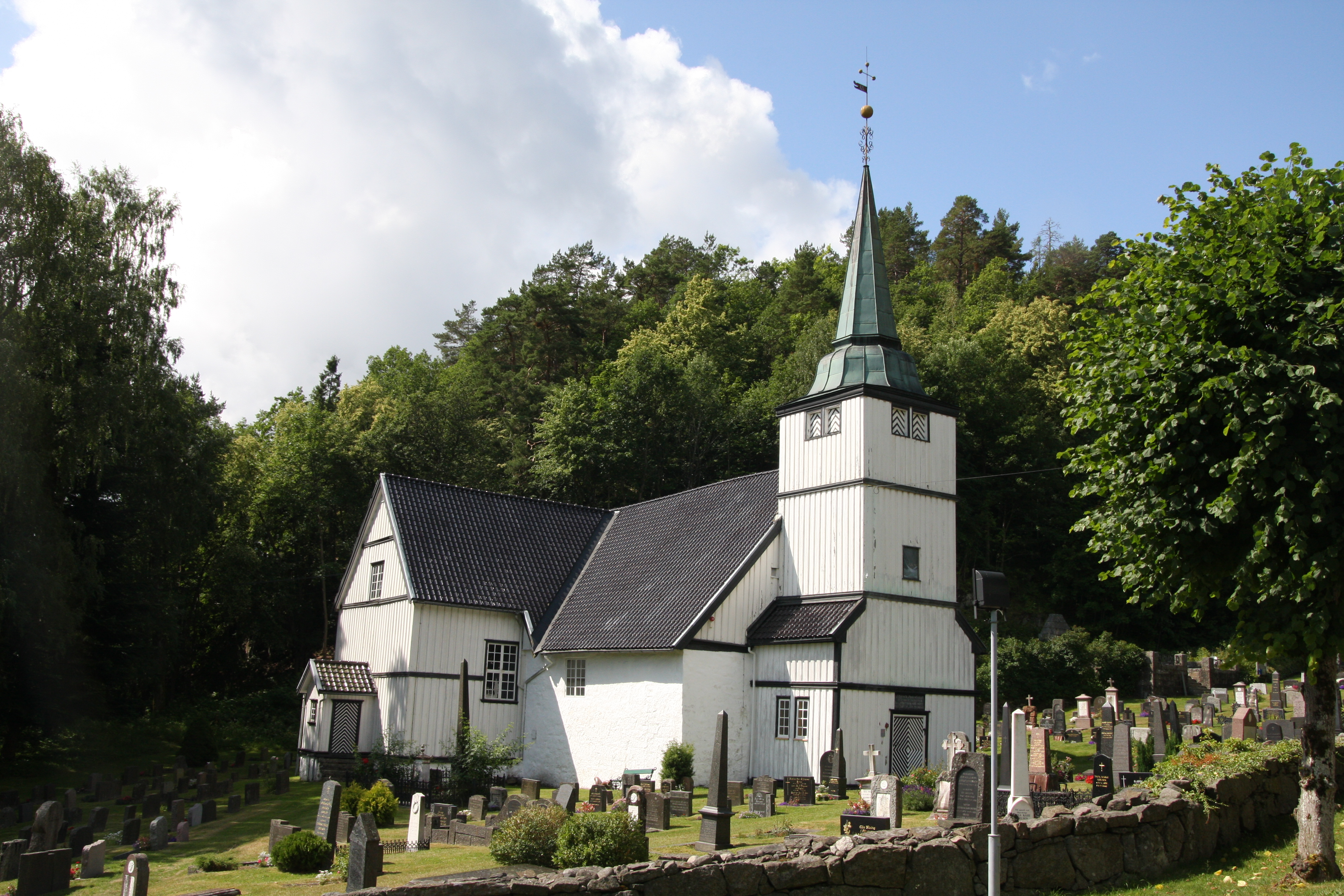
- View of the church
- Dypvåg Church
- 58.62631°N 09.05211°E
- Location: Tvedestrand Municipality, Agder
- Country: Norway
- Denomination: Church of Norway
- Previous denomination: Catholic Church
- Churchmanship: Evangelical Lutheran

History
- Former name: Dybvaag kirke
- Status: Parish church
- Founded: c. 1200
- Consecrated: c. 1200

Architecture
- Functional status: Active
- Architectural type: Cruciform
- Completed: c. 1200 (826 years ago)

Specifications
- Capacity: 500
- Materials: Stone

Administration
- Diocese: Agder og Telemark
- Deanery: Aust-Nedenes prosti
- Parish: Dypvåg
- Norwegian Cultural Heritage Site
- Type: Church
- Status: Automatically protected
- ID: 84042

Dypvåg Church (Norwegian: Dypvåg kirke) is a parish church of the Church of Norway in Tvedestrand Municipality in Agder county, Norway. It is located in the village of Dypvåg. It is the church for the Dypvåg parish which is part of the Aust-Nedenes prosti (deanery) in the Diocese of Agder og Telemark. The white, stone church was originally built in a long church design around the year 1200 using plans drawn up by an unknown architect (later it was converted into a cruciform design). The church seats about 500 people.

== History ==
The earliest existing historical records of the church date back to the year 1489, but the church was likely built around the year 1200. The original building had a rectangular nave with a narrower choir that had a lower roof line. The large stone walls of the building measure about 1.5 metres (4 ft 11 in) thick. The Romanesque building stood for a long time and then in 1759, the old choir was torn down and new timber-framed transverse wings were built along with a new choir to give the church a cruciform design. A new entryway was built on the north end of the building with a tower above the entrance. This big renovation was led by the architect Lars Albretsen Øvernes who had also renovated the nearby Holt Church a few years earlier.

In 1814, this church served as an election church (Norwegian: valgkirke). Together with more than 300 other parish churches across Norway, it was a polling station for elections to the 1814 Norwegian Constituent Assembly which wrote the Constitution of Norway. This was Norway's first national elections. Each church parish was a constituency that elected people called "electors" who later met together in each county to elect the representatives for the assembly that was to meet at Eidsvoll Manor later that year.

== Media gallery ==
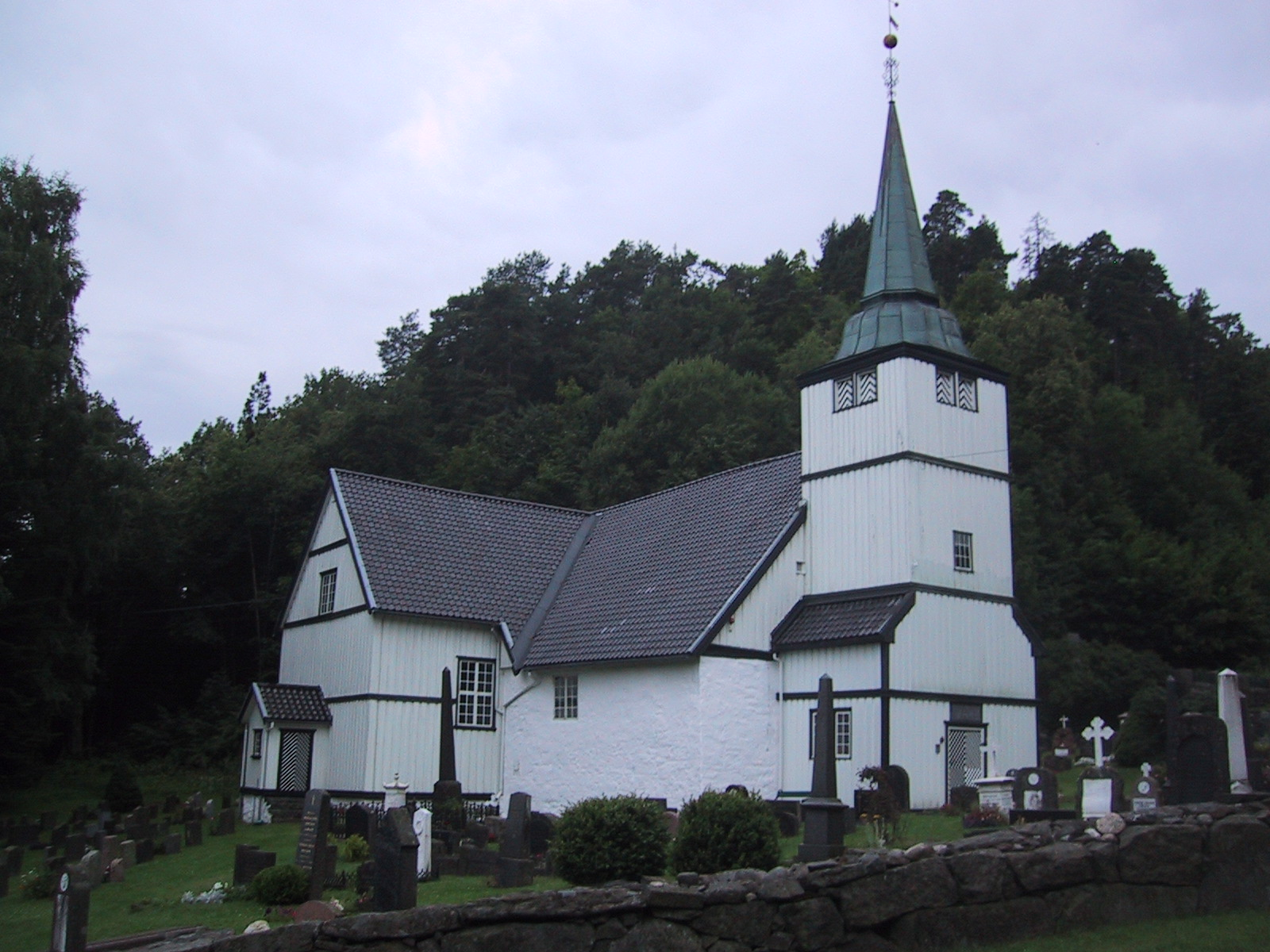

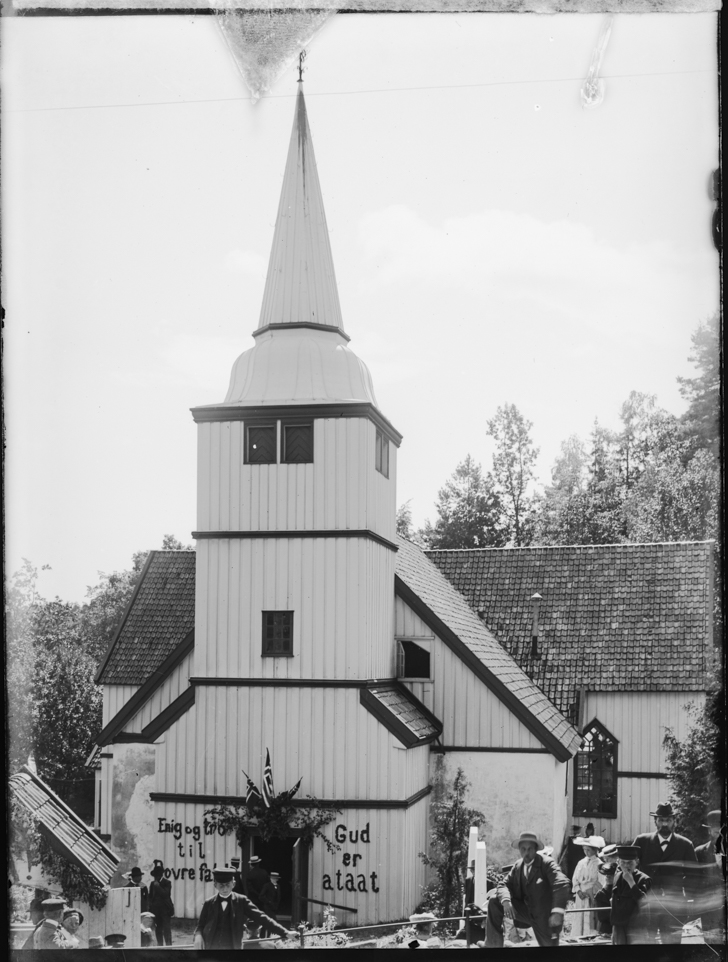

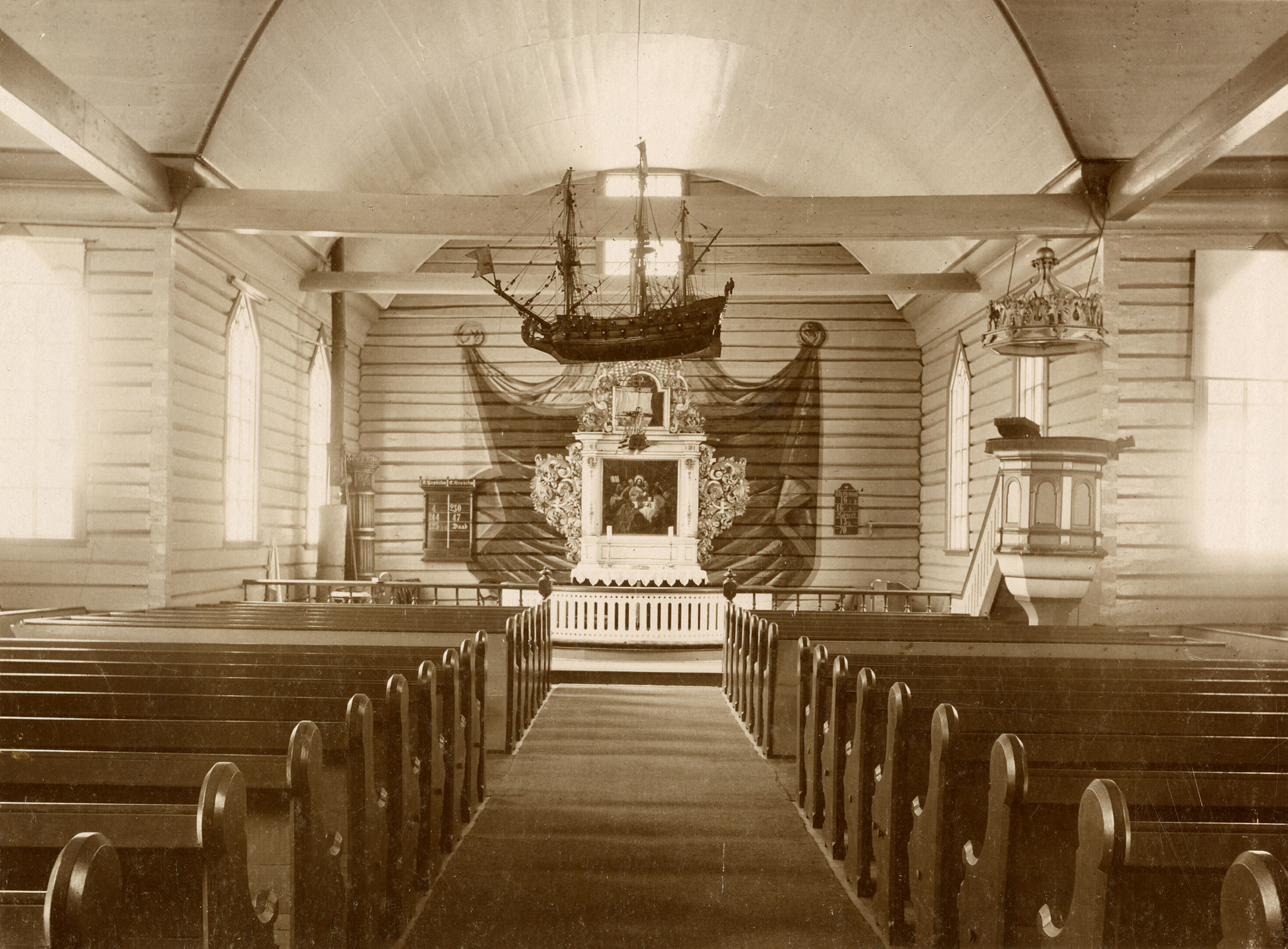

== See also ==
- List of churches in Agder og Telemark
