= Hansteen (crater) =

Crater on the Moon

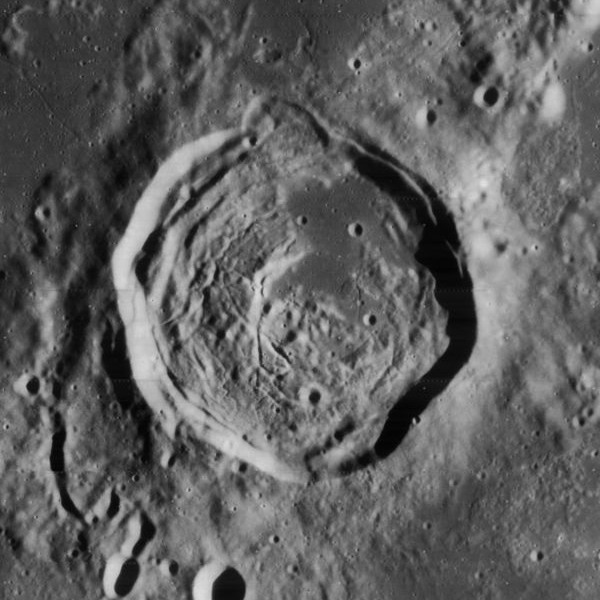
- Lunar Orbiter 4 image
- Coordinates: 11.5°S 52.0°W
- Diameter: 45 km
- Depth: 1.3 km
- Colongitude: 52° at sunrise
- Eponym: Christopher Hansteen

Hansteen is a lunar impact crater that lies near the southwest edge of the Oceanus Procellarum. To the southeast is the flooded crater Billy.

This formation dates to 3.87 ga, placing it in the Early Imbrian epoch of the lunar geologic timescale. The rim of Hansteen is somewhat polygonal in form, especially along the eastern side. There are a few terraces along the northwestern inner wall. The inner floor contains several ridges, hills, and some grooves, many of which parallel the outer rim. There is a flat patch of lower-albedo material in the northeast part of the interior.

Paralleling the southwest outer wall is the brief rille designated Rima Hansteen, a formation with a length of about 25 kilometers. To the southeast of the crater rises Mons Hansteen, or Hansteen Alpha (α). This is roughly triangular in shape and occupies an area about 30 km across on the mare. This feature is younger than Hansteen crater and is thought to be an extrusion of volcanic material.

== Satellite craters ==
By convention these features are identified on lunar maps by placing the letter on the side of the crater midpoint that is closest to Hansteen.

Hansteen	Latitude	Longitude	Diameter
A	12.7° S	52.2° W	6 km
B	12.7° S	52.4° W	6 km
E	10.5° S	50.5° W	28 km
K	13.9° S	53.2° W	3 km
L	13.5° S	52.9° W	3 km
