= Nina Sundbye =

Norwegian sculptor (born 1944)

- Born: 4 August 1944 (age 81); Oslo, Norway
- Occupation: Sculptor
- Awards: Order of St. Olav (2007)

Nina Sundbye (born 4 August 1944) is a Norwegian sculptor, born in Oslo. Her debut was a bust of illustrator Finn Graff from 1967. Among her other works is a bronze statue of Aasta Hansteen placed at Aker Brygge, and busts of resistance fighter Gregers Gram and comedians Leif Juster and Per Aabel, all located in Oslo. Sundbye is represented at the Norwegian Museum of Contemporary Art with the sculptures Operapar from 1971 and Klovn from 1978.

She was decorated Knight, First Class of the Order of St. Olav in 2007.
