= Mathilde Schjøtt =

Norwegian writer, literary critic, biographer and feminist

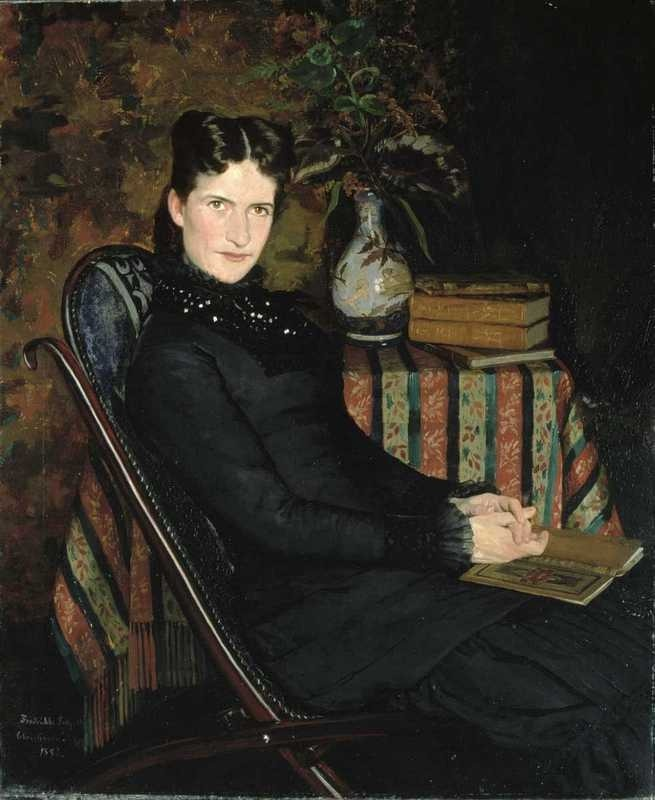
- Mathilde Schjøtt
- Born: Mathilde Dunker; 19 February 1844; Christiania, Norway
- Died: 13 January 1926 (aged 81); Oslo
- Occupations: Writer; Playwright; Literary critic
- Spouse: Peter Olrog Schjøtt
- Children: Sofie Schjøtt
- Parent(s): Bernhard Dunker; Edle Jasine Theodore Grundt
- Relatives: Conradine Birgitte Dunker (grandmother); Vilhelmine Ullmann (aunt)

Mathilde Schjøtt (née Dunker) (19 February 1844 – 13 January 1926) was a Norwegian writer, literary critic, biographer and feminist. She made her literary debut with the anonymous Venindernes samtale om Kvindens Underkuelse in 1871. She was a literary critic for the magazine Nyt Tidsskrift, and her play Rosen was published anonymously in this periodical in 1882. She was a co-founder of the Norwegian Association for Women's Rights in 1884, and a member its first board. She wrote a biography on Alexander L. Kielland in 1904.

== Personal life ==
Schjøtt was born in Christiania on 19 February 1944, a daughter of Bernhard Dunker and Edle Jasine Theodore Grundt. She married the philologist and politician Peter Olrog Schjøtt in 1867, and they were the parents of Sofie Schjøtt.
