= Viggo Ullmann =

Norwegian politician

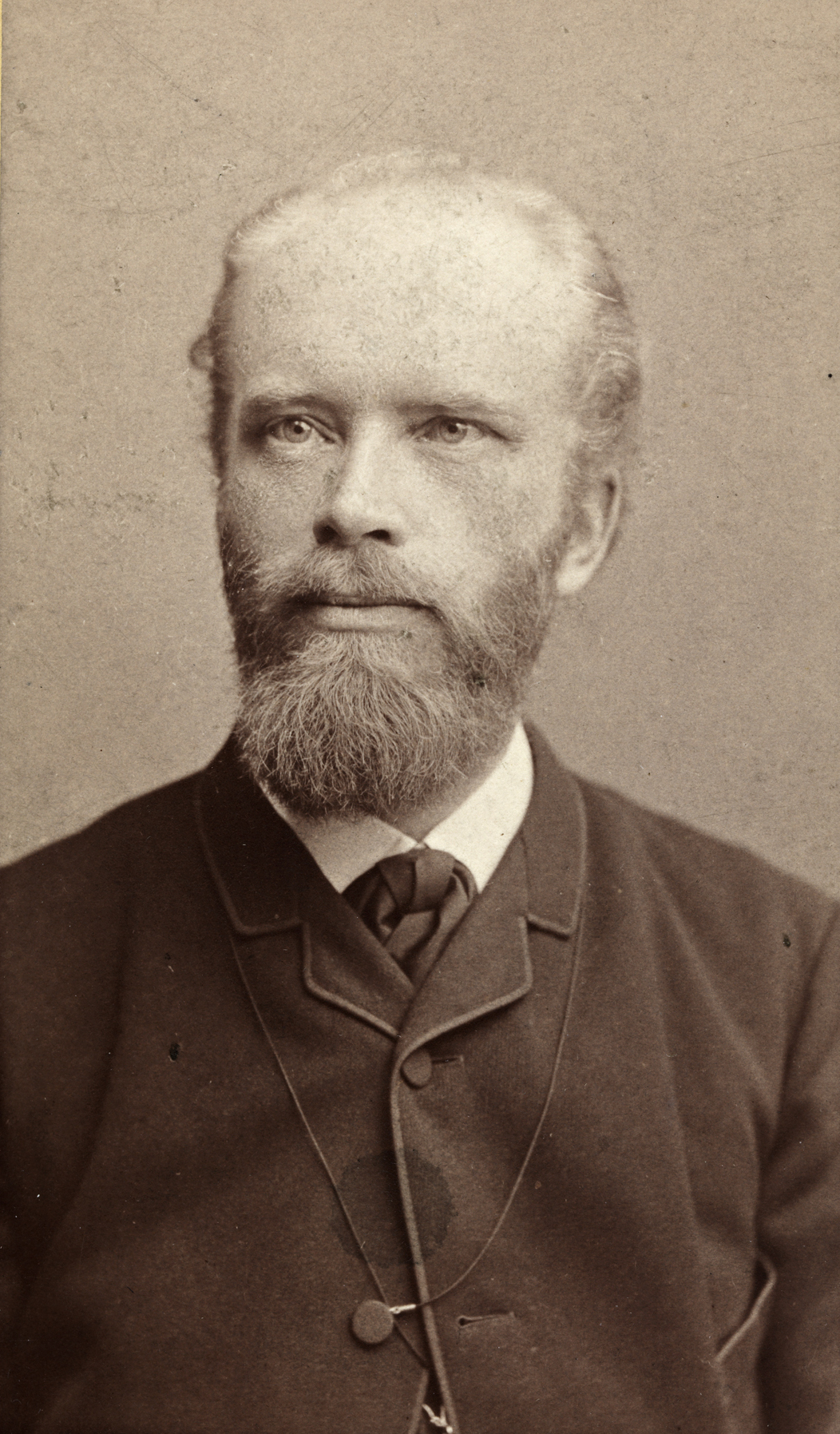

Member of the Norwegian Parliament
- In office 1886–1900
- Constituency: Bratsberg amt

Personal details
- Born: Johan Christian Viggo Ullmann; 21 December 1848
- Died: 30 August 1910 (aged 61)
- Education: University of Christiania
- Occupation: Educator and politician

Johan Christian Viggo Ullmann (21 December 1848 – 30 August 1910) was a Norwegian educator and politician with Venstre, the Norwegian Liberal party. He was the son of the author Vilhelmine Ullmann, brother of the feminist Ragna Nielsen and the great-grandfather of actress Liv Ullmann. Norway's first social doctor was his grandchild, also named Viggo Ullmann (Lillehammer, 1920–). Viggo translated Progress and Poverty to Norwegian in 1886.

== Career as a teacher ==
From 1870 he studied philology at the University of Christiania and was cand.philol. 1872. He received his Bachelor of Arts in 1875, after which he worked as a teacher at the Folk High Schools Skulestad, Østre Moland, Landvik, Bratsberg, Drangedal, Gjerpen and Vinje. At the liberal Folk High School in Seljord (Seljord Folkehøgskule), he worked for a more vocational approach to the study. In this period, he was also chairman of the publisher Det Norske Samlaget, as well as editor for the newspaper Varden. His pedagogy was influenced by the ideas of N. F. S. Grundtvig, where theology and learning was seen as a voluntary act, and obligatory exams were replaced by voluntary self-evaluation. He was also a spokesman of the theorems of American economist Henry George.

== Political career ==
He was the leader of the party Venstre (1893–1894 and 1898–1900), Member of Parliament for Bratsberg 1898–1900, Venstre's parliamentary leader 1893–1894 and President of the Storting 1892–94, 1897 and 1898–1900. In 1884 he was a co-founder of the Norwegian Association for Women's Rights. He helped The Association for Women's Suffrage (led by his sister, Ragna Nielsen) to write a suggestion for a change of the constitution, something which brought him into conflict with certain religious societies. Together with Prime Minister Wollert Konow, he was central in Norwegian Peace Association and was later (in 1890) behind the establishment of The Parliament's Peace Association and The Peace Letter to King Oscar II of Sweden. Ullman was First Deputy Member of the Nobel Committee (7 August 1897 – 5 June 1900). From 1902 until he died, he was county governor of Bratsberg amt (now Telemark).

== Selected works ==
Ullman also published several books:

- Plutarks levnetsbeskrivelser (Plutarch's Lives), 2 volumes, 1876–1877, translation
- Ammianus Marcellinus’s 25 aar av Roms historie (Ammianus Marcellinus’ 25 years of Roman history), 3 volumes, 1877–1881, translation
- Haandbok i verdenshistorien (Handbook to world history), 4 volumes, 1899–1905.

== Other sources ==
- Kløvstad, Jan (2000). Ild, begeistring og varme. Ivar Fløistad, Viggo Ullmann og folkehøgskolen i Austr Moland 1873-1875 (in Norwegian). Tvedestrand.
- Østvedt, Einar (1968). "Viggo Ullmann". Årbok for Telemark (in Norwegian).

Government offices
Preceded by Thomas von Westen Engelhart	County Governor of Bratsberg amt 1902–1910	Succeeded by Guthorm Hallager
Political offices
Preceded by Thomas Cathinco Bang; Sivert A. Nielsen; Olaus Olsen Eskeland; Emil Stang	President of the Storting; 1892–1900	Succeeded by Edvard Appoloniussen Liljedahl; Carl C. Berner
Party political offices
Preceded by Ole Anton Qvam	Leader of Venstre; 1898–1900	Succeeded by Lars Holst
Preceded by Johannes Steen	Leader of Venstre; 1893–1894	Succeeded by Ole Anton Qvam
