= Conradine Birgitte Dunker =

Norwegian socialite and writer

- Born: Hansteen; 25 August 1780
- Died: 11 September 1866

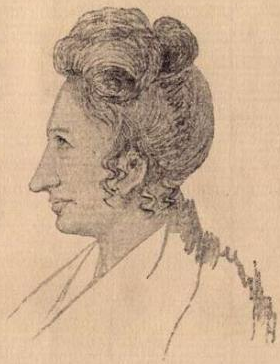
Conradine Birgitte Dunker.

Conradine Birgitte Dunker (née Hansteen) (25 August 1780 – 11 September 1866) was a Norwegian socialite and writer.

== Biography ==
Conradine Birgitte Hansteen was born in Christiania, 25 August 1780. Her parents were the custom official Johannes Mathias Hansteen (1744–1792) and Anne Cathrine Treschow (1754–1829). In 1796, she married captain Ulrik Anton Nicolai Blix Aamodt (1758-1806), and in 1807, she married the businessman Johan Friedrich Wilhelm Dunker (1775–1844). She was the mother of Bernhard Dunker and Vilhelmine Ullmann. Her younger brother was astronomer Christopher Hansteen; as such she was the aunt of feminist and painter Aasta Hansteen.

She held a "prominent spot in the social life of the capital city", according to one encyclopedia. She was involved in the Dramatic Society in 1796-1831, both as a translator and as an actress, and described as a talented actress, particularly in the Magdelone-parts in the Holberg plays.

Between 1814 and 1831, she managed a fashionable girls' school in her home: it was a conventional finishing school which focused on accomplishments and was one of the leading girls' schools for the rich in Christiania at that point.

In 1831, the family moved to Trondheim. She was widowed in 1844 and worked as a teacher in a girls' school managed by her daughter Jacobine from 1849 until the death of her daughter in 1857, after which she moved back to Christiania.

Her memoirs Gamle Dage : Erindringer og Tidsbilleder were published posthumously in 1871 and are seen as valuable sources on the 19th century cultural life. It has been re-published several times, and Conradine Birgitte Dunker was also biographed in 1996.
