= Ragna Nielsen =

Norwegian educator and feminist (1845–1924)

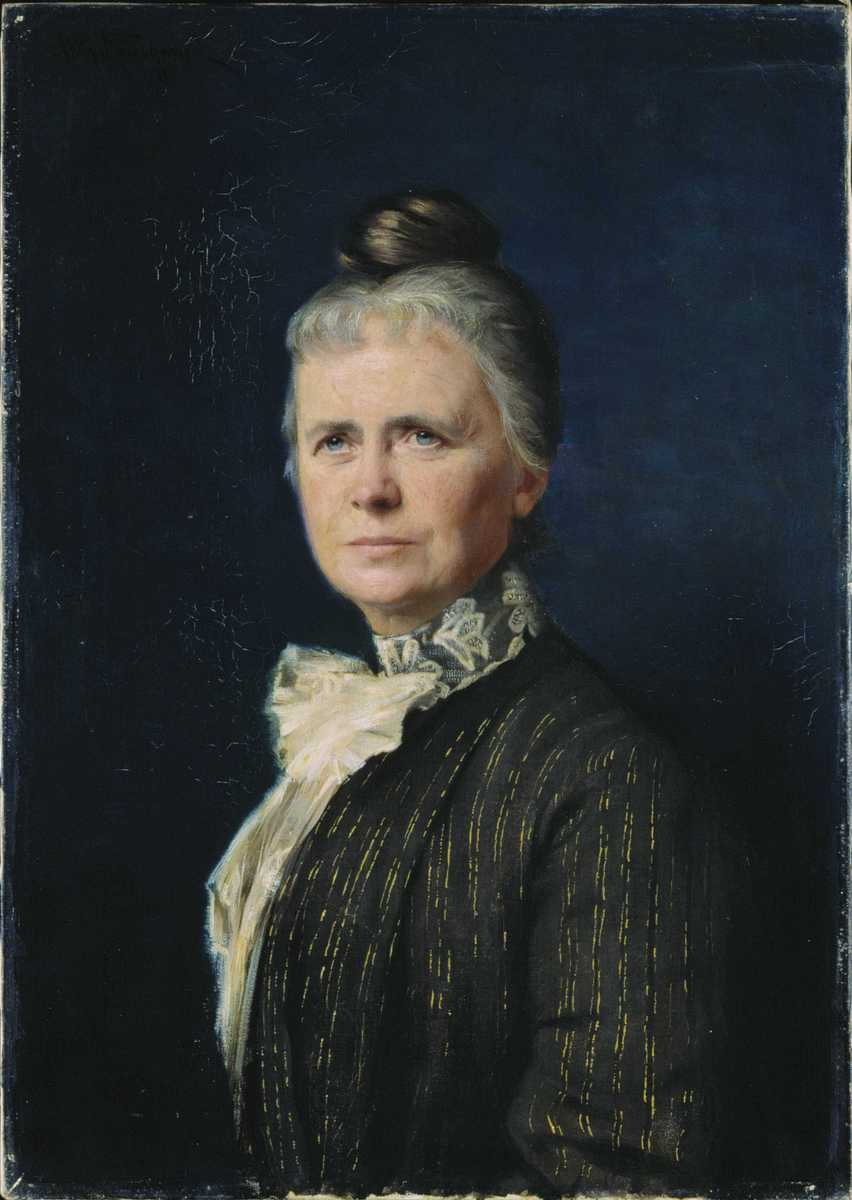
- Portrait by Asta Nørregaard

President of the Norwegian Association for Women's Rights
- In office 1886–1888
- Preceded by: Anna Stang
- Succeeded by: Anna Bugge
- In office 1889–1895
- Preceded by: Anna Bugge
- Succeeded by: Randi Blehr

2nd President of the Riksmål Society
- In office 1910–1911
- Preceded by: Bjørnstjerne Bjørnson
- Succeeded by: Alfred Eriksen

Personal details
- Born: Ragna Vilhelmine Ullmann; 17 July 1845
- Died: 29 September 1924 (aged 79)
- Parent: Vilhelmine Ullmann (mother)
- Relatives: Viggo Ullmann (brother)

Ragna Vilhelmine Nielsen (née Ullmann) (17 July 1845 – 29 September 1924) was a Norwegian pedagogue, school headmistress, publicist, organizer, politician and feminist.

== Personal life ==
Ragna Nielsen was born in Christiania (now Oslo) to Jørgen Axel Nicolai Ullmann and his wife, pedagogist, publicist, literary critic and feminist Cathrine Johanne Fredrikke Vilhelmine Dunker. She married Ludvig Nielsen in 1879, and settled with her husband in Tromsø. The couple was separated in 1884, when she moved back to Kristiania. She was the sister of politician Viggo Ullmann.

== Career ==
As a child, Ragna attended her mother's school for girls, and then attended Hartvig Nissen's private school for girls until 1860. From 1862, she received an assignment at Nissen's school, where she taught until 1879. She was a teacher in Tromsø until 1884. She established the school Fru Nielsens Latin- og Realskole in Kristiania in 1885. It was started as a girls' school, but soon became a common school for both girls and boys. She was the first headmistress of a secondary school (Norwegian: gymnas) in Norway. She chaired the Norwegian Association for Women's Rights twice, from 1886 to 1888, and again from 1889 to 1895. She founded or co-founded a number of organizations, including Kvindestemmeretsforeningen in 1885, Norske kvindelige Handelsstands Forening in 1890, Norsk Fredsforening in 1891, and Hjemmenes Vel in 1898. She was elected to the Kristiania City Council from 1901 to 1904. She co-founded the language organization Riksmålsforeningen in 1907, and chaired the organization from 1909 to 1910. She was engaged in the spiritualism movement and a co-founder of Norsk Selskap for Psykisk Forskning in 1917.

She co-founded the women's magazine Norske Kvinder in 1921. Among her books are Norske kvinder i det 19de aarhundrede from 1904, Fra de smaa følelsers tid from 1907 (published anonymously), and Sisyphos og de politiske partier from 1922.
