= Waldemar Hansteen =

Norwegian architect (1857–1921)

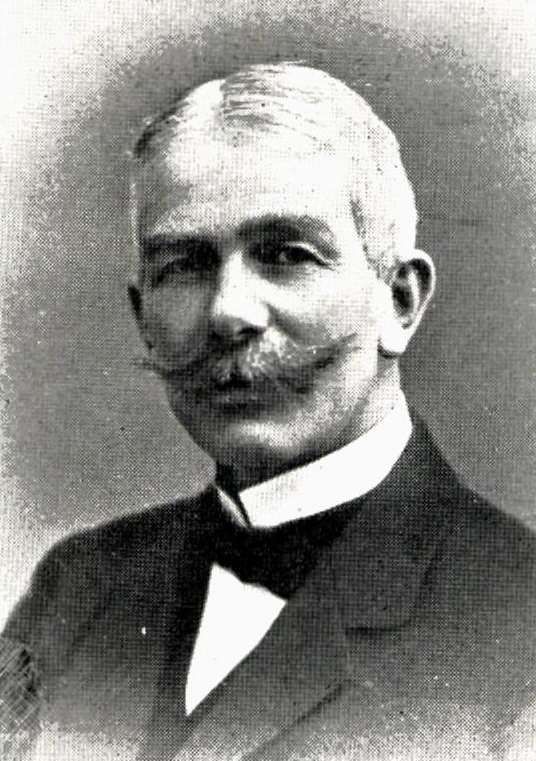
Waldemar Hansteen

Albert Waldemar Hansteen (25 May 1857 - 4 May 1921) was a Norwegian architect.

== Biography ==
Hansteen was born in Christiania (now Oslo), Norway. He was the son of Supreme Court Attorney Christopher Hansteen (1822–1912) and Lagertha Cecilie Wulfsberg (1820–1897). He was a student at Hartvig Nissens skole. He worked at the office of architect Wilhelm von Hanno (1877–1879). Together with Torolf Prytz, Hansteen studied at the Technische Hochschule Hannover (now Leibniz University Hannover) where he was a student of Conrad Wilhelm Hase (1879–1881). He conducted study trips to Austria, Germany and Antwerp in 1885.

From 1890 to 1918, he was an instructor in building construction at Christiania Technical School (Christiania tekniske skole), while working as an independent architect in Christiania. He worked mainly in his hometown and Skien. He shared responsibility for the Norwegian contribution to the 1893 World's Columbian Exposition in Chicago.

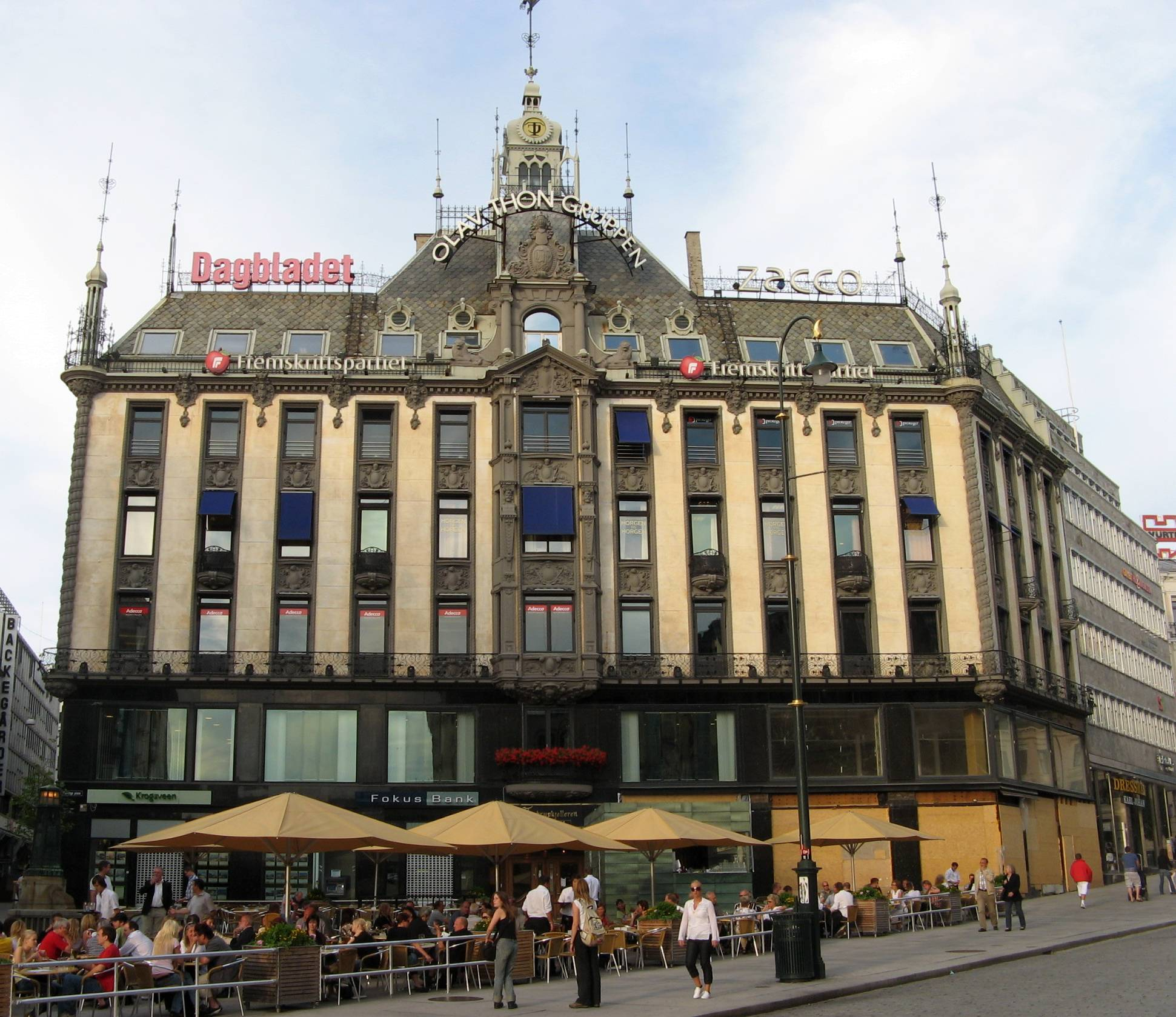
Tostrupgården in Oslo

He is most associated with his work on Tostrup Yard (Tostrupgården), a business premises on Karl Johans Gate in Oslo. The structure was designed by architects Christian Fürst, Torolf Prytz, and Waldemar Hansteen and built between 1896 and 1898. The five-story building was one of the oldest in Norway with load-bearing structures in steel. It was also among the first to have an elevator and use electric lighting.

He also oversaw the erection of Gol stave church at Bygdøy, today a part of the Norwegian Museum of Cultural History. His work included the main office of the former Central Bank of Norway (1912–1922, with Henrik Bull), as well as the headquarters of the former Fellesbanken and Sparebanken NOR.

His son Valdemar Scheel Hansteen (1897–1980) also became an architect.

== Gallery ==
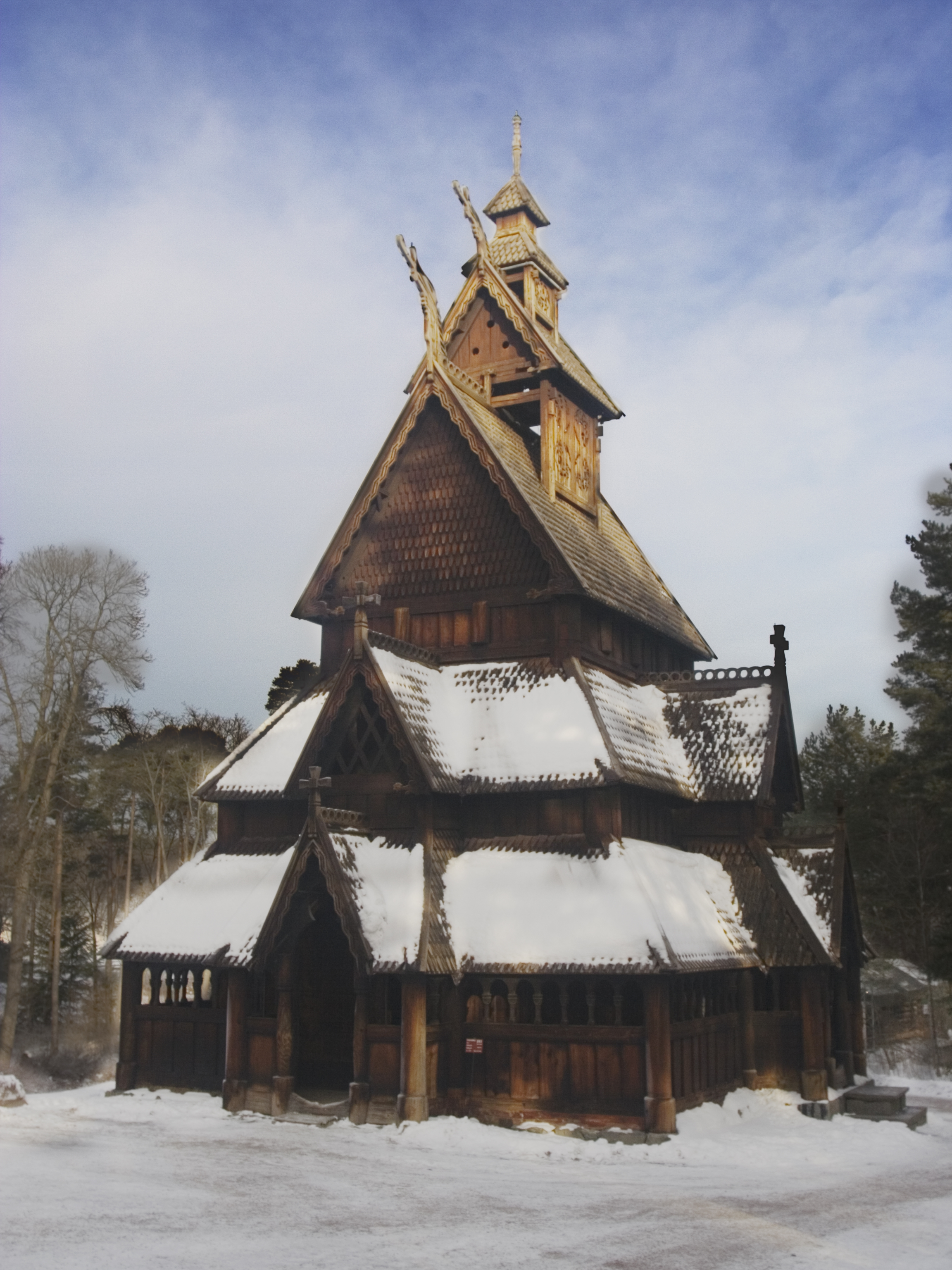
Gol stave church at Bygdøy (1883–84)

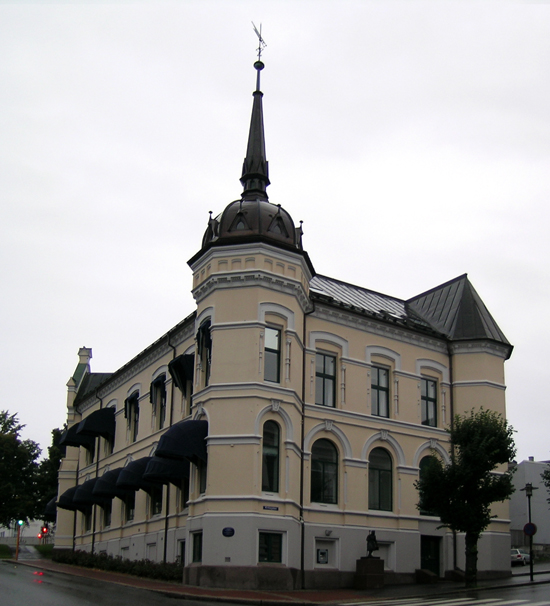
Skiens Sparebank (1887–91)

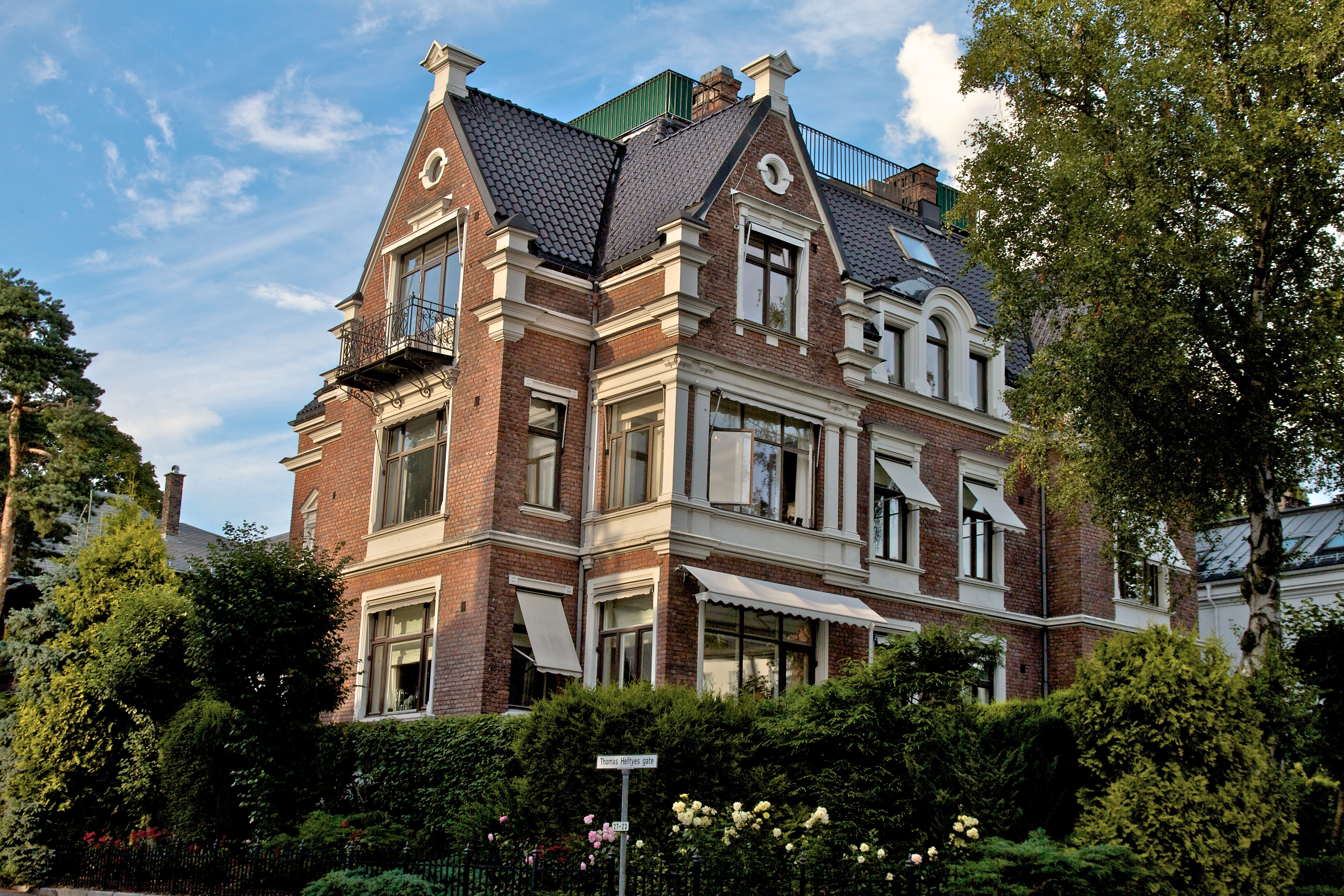
Thomas Heftyes gate in Oslo (1895)

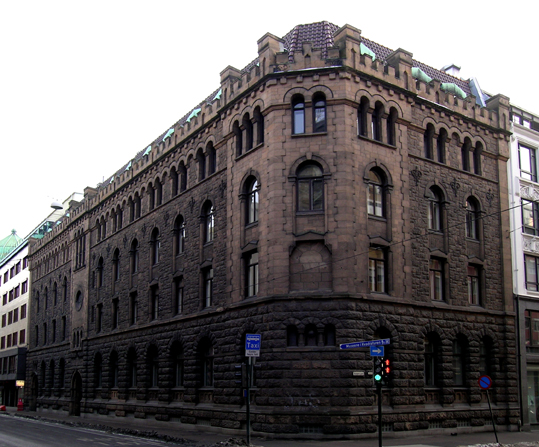
Tollbugata 20 in Oslo (1905)
