= Stener Johannes Stenersen =

Norwegian veterinarian (1835–1904)

Stener Johannes Stenersen (15 July 1835 – 7 July 1904) was a Norwegian veterinarian.

Stenersen was born in Elverum in Hedmark, Norway. He was the son of priest Gabriel Hofgaard Stenersen and Anne Birgitte Irgens. He was a nephew of theologian Stener Johannes Stenersen (1789-1835). After graduating from Christiania Cathedral School, he attended the Royal Veterinary College of Copenhagen from 1853 to 1857. He then became county veterinarian in Hedmark, working in Østerdalen from 1857 to 1860 and Hedmarken from 1860 to 1863. In July 1862 in Ringsaker he married Helga Hermana Heltberg (1842–1921). They had a son, Gudmund Stenersen, a painter.

In May 1883 he was hired as state agronomist in Western Norway, with special responsibility for stockbreeding. He was stationed in Voss for one year, then in Stavanger. He became a national expert on breeding, especially horse breeding. In 1888, Stenersen wrote Vestlandshesten (Fjordhesten), the first monograph on the Fjord horse native to the west coast of Norway. Other notable publications include the paper Alderen for Hestens Kastration (1876), which earned him the Royal Veterinary College Gold Medal. He died in 1904 in Stavanger.
