= Aasta Hansteen =

Norwegian artist, activist (1824–1908)

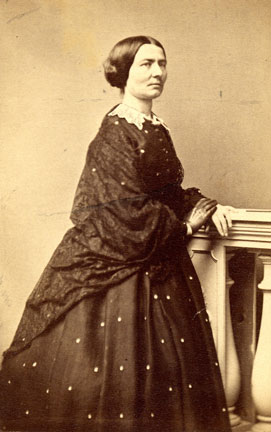
Aasta Hansteen in 1863

Aasta Hansteen, also known as Hasta Hanseen (born December 10, 1824 – April 13, 1908), was a Norwegian painter, writer, and early feminist.

== Life and career ==
Aasta Hansteen was born in Christiania, modern day Oslo, the daughter of Christopher Hansteen, a noted professor of astronomy, geophysics and applied mathematics at the University of Oslo. She started her art education in Copenhagen (1840 - 1841) where she learned to draw. She continued her training for three years at the Kunstakademie Düsseldorf where she studied fine brush alignment. She is associated with the Düsseldorf school of painting. She exhibited her work at the 1855 World's Fair in Paris.

She returned to Norway and settled in Christiania where she, for several years, was in demand as the city's only portrait artist. Her most famous painting is possibly the portrait of her father, which is on permanent exhibit at the National Gallery of Norway.

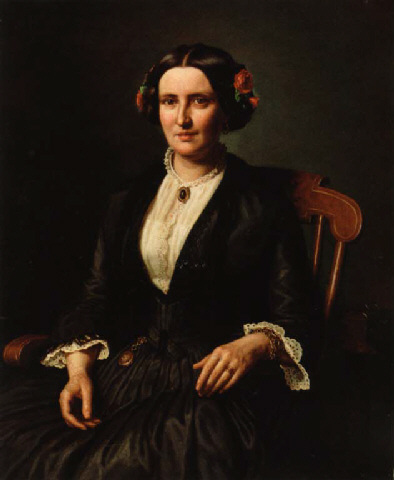
Woman with rose in her hair painted by Aasta Hansteen (1853)

Overwhelmed by the interest in her portraits, she resigned from her craft for several years and moved to Telemark, where she developed an interest in Norwegian dialects. When she moved back to Christiania, she studied with the linguist Ivar Aasen. In 1862 she published anonymously a small book written in Nynorsk and had the distinction of being the first woman to publish in this language.

Together with her foster daughter Theodora Nielsen, she sailed from Christiania on April 9, 1880. She lived in the United States for nine years (1880-1889). She spent six and a half years in the Boston area and two and a half years in the Midwest, primarily Chicago. Aasta Hansteen met or observed such leading reformers on the time as Lucy Stone, Julia Ward Howe, Mary Livermore, and Wendell Phillips. Her initial income came from writing for the Christiania-based newspaper Verdens Gang, which she supplemented by painting portraits on commission. Among others, Norwegian reformer and editor Marcus Thrane sat for his portrait. In 1889, she returned to Norway with a renewed interest in the women's movement. She joined the Norwegian Association for Women's Rights (Norsk Kvinnesaksforening) and became an active contributor in the press on women's rights.

Hansteen died in Kristiania, modern-day Oslo.

Hansteen was a vocal critic of the Judeo-Christian and Pauline perception of women, which she felt was denigrating of women's spiritual worth. She was a strong and controversial personality, who frequented cafes and markets on her own, and became one of the more colorful fixtures in Oslo.

== Legacy ==
Henrik Ibsen is said to have used her as a model for the character Lona Hessel in his play The Pillars of Society. Additionally she was believed to have served as the inspiration for the title role in Gunnar Heiberg's Aunt Ulrikke. Norwegian pianist and composer Agathe Backer Grøndahl dedicated compositions to her. Her grave in Vår Frelsers gravlund in Oslo is marked with a bust made by Gustav Vigeland. Aasta Hansteens vei (road) in the Stovner borough of the city of Oslo and Aasta Hansteens vei in Trondheim are both named for Aasta Hansteen. A statue of her by Norwegian sculptor, Nina Sundbye, is located in the Aker Brygge area of Oslo.

The Aasta Hansteen gas field came on stream 16 December 2018. The Aasta Hansteen field is located in 1 300 meters of water in the Vøring area in the Norwegian Sea, 300 kilometers west of Sandnessjøen. Its floating platform is taller than the Eiffel tower.

== Selected works ==
- Skrift og Umskrift i Landsmaalet, 1862
- Kvindens stilling i Verden, i Nordisk Maanedsskrift for folkelig og kristelig Oplysning, 1871
- Kvinden skabt i Guds Billede, 1878
- Kristi kirke i det nittende aarhundrede, 1897
- Dikt i (Ivar Aasens) landsmaal. 1862–67, 1908
