= St. Anne's School, Aurora =

Canadian independent day school

St. Anne's School

Location
- 306 St. John's Sideroad; Aurora, Ontario; Canada; 44.005958°N 79.285451°W

Information
- School type: Independent day school
- Established: 2022; 4 years ago
- Brother school: St. Andrew's College
- Grades: 5 to 12
- Gender: Girls
- Enrolment: 156
- Colours: Red and white
- Mascot: Swan
- Team name: Cygnets
- Website: www.stannes.ca

St. Anne's School (SAS), founded in 2022, is an independent day school located in Aurora, Ontario, Canada. Closely associated with St. Andrew's College, St. Anne's is a university-preparatory school for girls in grades 5 to 12, with students currently enrolled in grades 5–11, and a new grade level will be added each year until 12 is reached. It is the first all-girls private school in the Regional Municipality of York.

The school has 186 enrolled students, with 18 to 20 students per classroom. Tuition ranges from $41,440 to 44,845 CAD.

== History ==
St. Andrew's College, an independent boarding and day school for boys, was founded in 1899. Almost 110 years later, SAC's Head of School Kevin McHenry joked with a local mansion's owner (Andrew Dunin) that "his stately manor would be an ideal setting for a school for girls," which began ideation for beginning St. Anne's School under the same guidance and direction as St. Andrew's College. The plans were officially announced in October 2020.

Although the St. Anne's School mansion officially opened for the 2023 school year, the school's first cohort of students in grade 9 began within the St. Andrew's Cygnet Centre for the duration of the 2022–2023 academic year. The St. Anne's School mansion is located at 306 St. John's Sideroad, north of the St. Andrew's College campus. It commenced operations with 156 students for the 2023–2024 academic year.

== Athletics and co-curricular activities ==
Similarly with St. Andrew's College, sports are an important part of school life and culture. During the school's first year of operations in 2022, students partook in multiple athletic activities, including their first Terry Fox run, first athletic teams and partnered co-curricular activities with SAC students.
