= Theatre Aurora =

Theatre Aurora is an entirely volunteer-run community theatre in Aurora, Ontario, that opened in 1958. The company puts on at least five theatrical productions annually, including one musical, and also rents space to other events, including concerts and performances. The theatre is located on Henderson Drive in Aurora.

== History ==
Theatre Aurora opened in 1958 as the Aurora Drama Workshop. They performed their first show, Tovarich, at the Aurora High School.

In 1973, through an amalgamation with the Aurora Musical Theatre Society, Theatre Aurora was born. In 1974 Theatre Aurora took up residence at its Henderson Drive location through a lease with the Town of Aurora of a former cement factory. Through extensive renovations, members and patrons slowly began to transform the building over the years into the theatre that exists today.
