= Lloyd Chadburn =

Canadian WWII fighter pilot (1919–1944)

Lloyd Vernon Chadburn DSO & bar, DFC
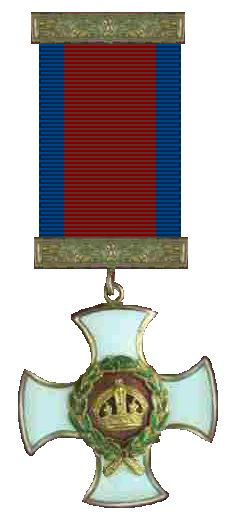
- Distinguished Service Order
- Born: August 21, 1919; Montreal, Quebec
- Died: 13 June 1944 (aged 24) †; Normandy, France
- Military career
- Allegiance: Canada
- Branch: Royal Canadian Air Force
- Service years: 1940 – 1944
- Rank: Wing Commander
- Nickname: "Chad"
- Conflicts: World War II
- Awards: Distinguished Service Order & Bar; Distinguished Flying Cross; Croix de Guerre (France)

Lloyd Vernon "Chad" Chadburn DSO & Bar, DFC (21 August 1919 – 13 June 1944) was a Canadian World War II fighter pilot.

== Biography ==
=== Early life ===
Lloyd Chadburn was born in Montreal, Quebec, on 21 August 1919, later moving with his parents to Oshawa, Ontario, as an infant. He grew up there and in Aurora. He attended Aurora Public School and Aurora High School and completed his secondary education at Northern secondary school. He worked as a bank clerk at the Bank of Toronto and as a salesman for the Red Rose Tea Company.

=== Career ===
Chadburn applied to enlist in both the Army and Navy in 1939, but was turned down both times. After a spell working for General Motors and with the Bank of Toronto, he was accepted by the Royal Canadian Air Force (RCAF) as an Air Gunner in April 1940, but re-mastered as a Pilot. He graduated from the Number 2 Flight Training School in Ottawa on 9 October 1940 as a Pilot Officer.

In December 1940 Chadburn was posted to Number 112 (Army Cooperation) Squadron flying Hawker Hurricanes and made his first operational flight in March 1941. He was posted to the United Kingdom in 1941, and joined 412 Squadron (RCAF) in June 1941, moving to 19 Squadron (RAF) in September.

In February 1942 Chadburn was posted to Number 416 (RCAF) Squadron in Peterhead, Scotland as a Flight Lieutenant. Days later he took over command of the squadron, becoming the first graduate of the British Commonwealth Air Training Plan to lead a Fighter Command squadron. He was also the youngest Squadron Leader in the RCAF at the age of 21.

“When we were flying with the City of Oshawa Squadron, there wasn’t a guy who ever asked Chad where we were going. When he told us we were off for a scramble we jumped to get going. We didn’t care where. If he was leading us we just naturally tag along" - Flight Lieutenant John Arthur “Jackie” Rae, CM, DFC.

Promoted to squadron leader, Chadburn and 416 Squadron flew defensive missions over Dieppe on 19 August 1942, covering the Canadian and Allied raid and claiming his first air victories. He was then awarded the Distinguished Flying Cross. After a period of leave in Canada, he was posted to No. 402 Squadron and then No. 403 Squadron, prior to his promotion to wing commander for the RAF Digby Wing in June 1943. He led the Wing in flying escort to American bombers and the RAF medium bombers of No. 2 Group. He was supposedly dubbed The Angel for his escort would assure the bomber crews a safe passage to and from the target. On 3 November 1943 the Wing claimed seven Bf 109's of II./JG 3 (five were actually lost), with Chadburn claiming two personally.

By the time Chadburn left the Digby Wing in December he had received the Distinguished Service Order twice, the first RCAF officer to be so decorated and was one of only four in history. In early 1944, he was appointed wing commander, Fighter Operations at RCAF Group Headquarters Overseas. He was sent back to Canada for a war bond drive in the spring and upon his return was made wing commander of Number 127 Wing RCAF, comprising 403, 421 and 416 Squadrons.

=== Death ===
On 13 June 1944, Chadburn was killed in a mid-air collision with another Spitfire pilot while taking off from a landing strip in Normandy. He was 24 years of age.

=== Honours ===
Chadburn's record includes five enemy airplanes destroyed (three shared), five aircraft probably destroyed (one shared), seven aircraft damaged (two shared), two E-boats destroyed, and another two damaged, as well as a destroyer damaged.

Chadburn was made a Chevalier (knight) in the French Légion d'honneur and awarded the Croix de Guerre avec Palme. Only three RCAF officers received the Légion d'honneur, and Chadburn was the only one to receive the Croix de Guerre.

His name is listed on memorials in both Aurora High School and Northern Secondary school in Toronto Ontario which he attended.

Chadburn also has an air cadet Squadron in Oshawa named after him, the 151 Chadburn air cadets.

Chadburn is featured in True Aviation Comics No. 10.

== Sources ==
Gone is the Angel - Biography of Lloyd Chadburn
