= Gord MacFarlane =

Canadian ice hockey player

- Born: January 1, 1956 (age 69); Aurora, Ontario, Canada
- Height: 6 ft 0 in (183 cm)
- Weight: 182 lb (83 kg; 13 st 0 lb)
- Position: Centre
- Shot: Right
- Played for: Grand Rapids Owls; Toledo Goaldiggers
- Playing career: 1979–1983

Gord MacFarlane (born January 1, 1956) is a Canadian retired ice hockey player.

== Amateur career ==
MacFarlane attended St. Andrew's College, Aurora and the University of Vermont.

== Professional career ==
MacFarlane was a prospect of the Philadelphia Flyers.

MacFarlane began his career with the Grand Rapids Owls and finished his career with the Toledo Goaldiggers. In total, MacFarlane played 226 regular season games in the International Hockey League (1945–2001).
