= St. Andrew's College, Aurora =

St. Andrew's College

Location
- 15800 Yonge Street; Aurora, Ontario, L4G 3H7; Canada; 44°00′40″N 79°28′38″W

Information
- School type: Independent boarding and day
- Motto: ΑΝΔΡΙΖΕΣΘΕ ΚΡΑΤΑΙΟΥΣΘΕ (Quit ye like men, be strong)
- Religious affiliation: Non-denominational Christianity
- Established: September 1899; 127 years ago
- Founder: The Rev. Dr. George Bruce
- Sister school: St. Anne's School, Aurora
- CEEB code: 826019
- Head of school: Kevin McHenry
- Faculty: 77
- Grades: 5 to 12
- Gender: Boys
- Enrolment: 659
- Campus size: 126 acres
- Colours: Red and white
- Mascot: Andy
- Team name: Saints
- Publication: The Andrean
- Yearbook: The Review
- Website: sac.on.ca

St. Andrew's College (SAC) is an independent boarding and day school founded in 1899 and located in Aurora, Ontario, Canada. It is a university-preparatory school for boys in grades 5 to 12, with a focus on academic achievement, athletics, and leadership development. It is accredited by the Canadian Educational Standards Institute and is affiliated with other associations, including CAIS, CASE, NAIS and the International Boys' Schools Coalition (IBSC). The school's coat of arms was registered with the Canadian Heraldic Authority on August 15, 2006.

== History ==
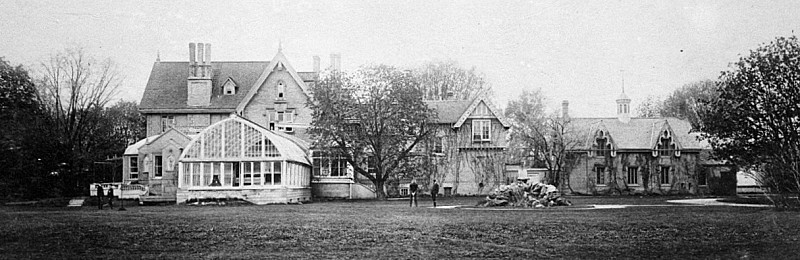
Chestnut Park, which served as the SAC campus from 1899 to 1905

St. Andrew's College was originally located at the northeast corner of Yonge Street and Roxborough Avenue in the Rosedale neighbourhood of Toronto, in a mansion named Chestnut Park that was previously owned by Sir David Macpherson. The school opened on September 10, 1899, under the direction of Headmaster the Rev. Dr. George Bruce. The first student to enroll was Douglas W. Fraser ('06). By the end of the first school year, there were 56 students, including 13 boarders.

The Rev. Dr. George Bruce was succeeded as Headmaster in 1900 by the Rev. Dr. Bruce Macdonald, and in 1901, the school published its first yearbook – The Review. The Old Boys Association, still active presently, was founded in 1903.

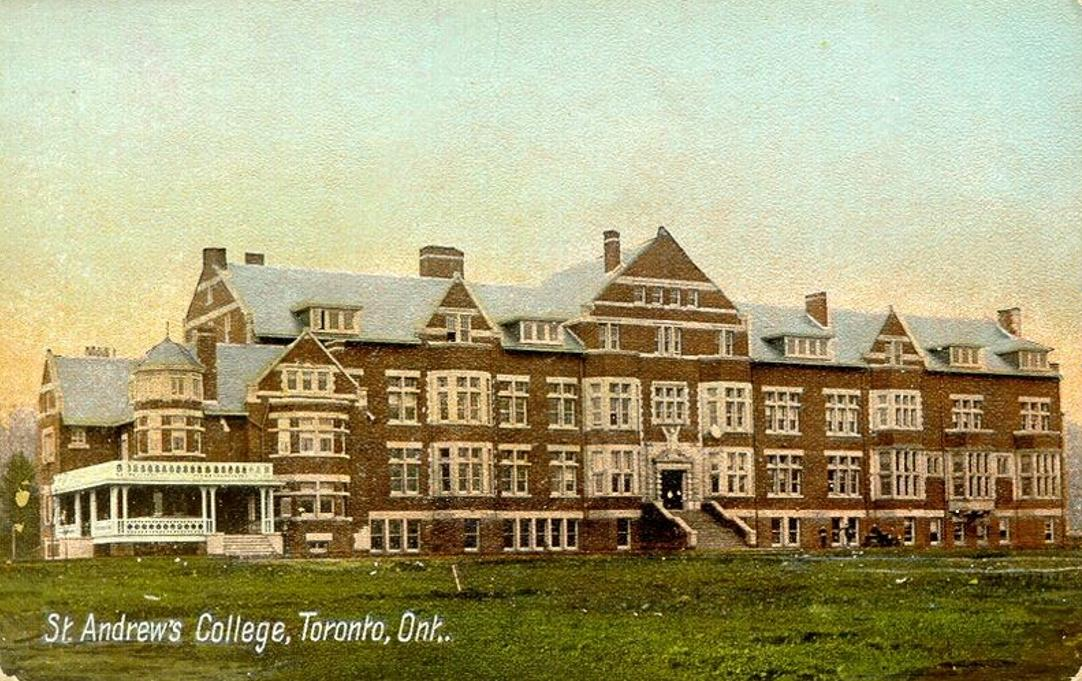
The second location in Rosedale, which was the school's home from 1905 to 1926

In 1905, due to the increasing size of the student body, the school moved to a new campus within Rosedale, west of MacLennan Avenue, from Summerhill Avenue to Douglas Drive just north of Rosedale Field, in a large Collegiate Gothic structure. The Rosedale Campus was designed to serve 150 boarders, 300 day boys, and 9 masters.

By 1909, the school had students from Canada, Jamaica, the United States, Mexico, Costa Rica, Panama, China, and Bermuda. In 1911, the school became a corporation under the control of a Board of Governors.

Over 600 Old Boys fought in the First World War, and 104 lost their lives, along with 2 masters. From 1918 to 1920, the school temporarily moved to Knox College, since the Rosedale Campus was serving as a military hospital for soldiers who were wounded during the war.

The school made its final move in 1926 to Aurora, where the current campus occupies a 126-acre (0.51 km^{2}) site in a suburban environment. Its Georgian Revival architecture is built around the traditional quadrangle form. The Memorial Gateway entrance was completed in 1928.

Over 600 Old Boys served during the Second World War, and 45 lost their lives. Plaques listing the names of those who lost their lives are displayed in the Memorial Chapel.

In 1956, the school magazine The Andrean was created, and it has been published ever since.

There are four boarding houses on campus, which is home to approximately half of the 651 boys. Many members of the faculty also live on campus.

The Aurora campus was featured in the filming of Cadet Kelly, and in the fifth episode of the Netflix mini-series The Queen's Gambit.

=== Cadet Corps ===
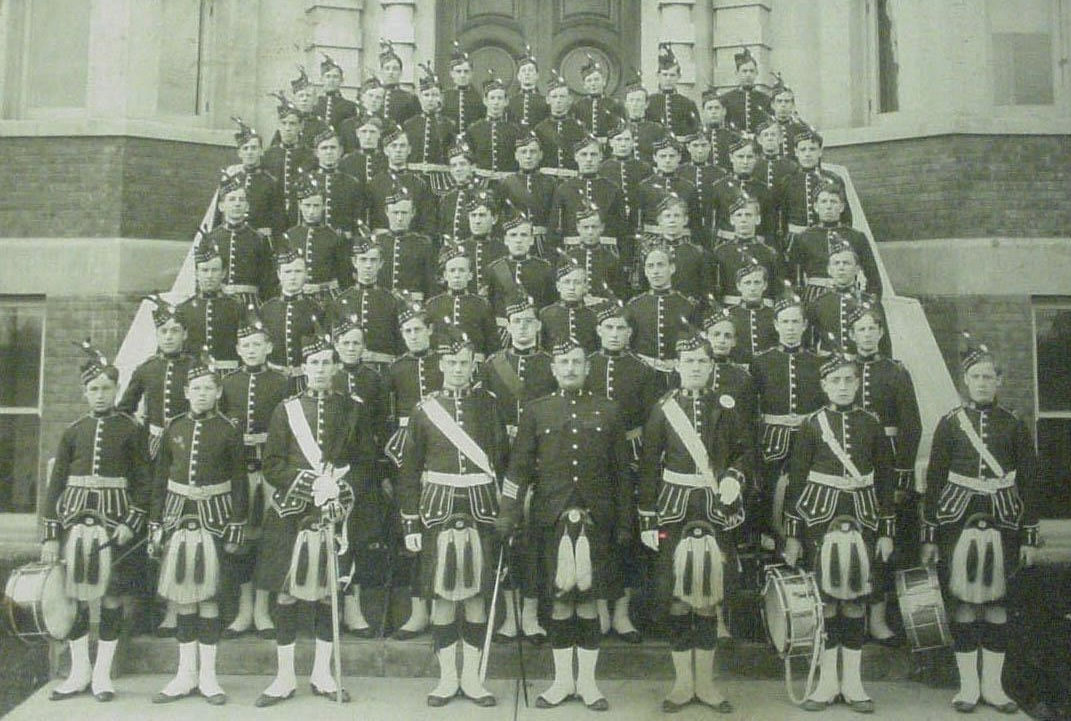
The first cadet corps in 1905–06, with Vincent Massey in the front row, 3rd from left

St. Andrew's is home to Canada's second-largest Royal Canadian Army Cadets Corps. Established in 1905, the #142 St. Andrew's College Highland Cadet Corps is now a multi-year leadership program, but it still culminates in an annual inspection and parade in April.

The cadet corps was raised in the fall of 1905, following the model of military training offered at Upper Canada College and Trinity College School. The corps was under the direction of schoolteacher and militiaman Capt. Grant Cooper and Drill Instructor Sgt. Alfred R. Hatt, who had fought with the Gordon Highlanders at Chitral and in South Africa. The first Cadet Inspection was held at the Rosedale Campus on May 14, 1906, under the Command of Captain Cooper, and the first student cadet commander was First Lieutenant Vincent Massey. On April 24, 1906, the corps made its first public appearance at Queen's Park, where it was reviewed by the Duke of Connaught, and on May 18, it participated in training drills with the 48th Highlanders. The cadet corps provided a guard of honour during the Royal Tour of 1939.

The school's cadet corps was affiliated with the 48th Highlanders of Canada from its inception, as the commanding officer of the regiment was Col. William C. Macdonald, cousin to headmaster Bruce Macdonald. The corps retains the same motto ("Dileas Gu Brath" – "Faithful Forever"), as well as uniform (scarlet tunic and Modern Gordon tartan). In 2005, the centennial year, the corps was granted the Freedom of the City of Aurora.

=== Pipes and Drums ===
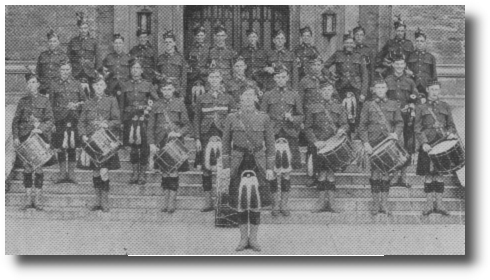
The Pipes and Drums band in 1919

The Pipes and Drums band is an integral part of the cadet corps and one of its best-known elements. The Pipes and Drums were established in 1915 under the tutelage of Pipe Major James Fraser of the 48th Highlanders, formerly of the Gordon Highlanders, who had fought at Dargai and in South Africa. In 1941, a jaguar skin that had been shot by Theodore Roosevelt was donated to the college to be worn by the bass drummer.

The primary responsibility of the Pipes and Drums band is to provide music for the Battalion when it is on the march. In this role, the band is front and centre during the Annual Church Parade, the Head of School's Parade, and the Annual Cadet Inspection in April.

Internationally renowned as "North America's piping heartland" for its Piping and Drumming program, St. Andrew's College attracts hundreds of potential pipers each year to its summer "Ontario School of Piping and Drumming at St. Andrew's College" camp. In June 2019, the decision was made to field a competitive band in grade 2 alongside the existing band, which competed in grade 5.

=== Headmasters ===
- The Rev. Dr. George Bruce (1899–1900)
- The Rev. Dr. Bruce Macdonald (1900–1935)
- Dr. Kenneth Ketchum (1935–1942, 1945–1958)
- J.C. Garret – Acting Head (1942–1945)
- Joseph Robert Coulter (1958–1974)
- Dr. Thomas Hockin (1974–1981)
- Robert Bédard (1981–1997)
- E.G. "Ted" Staunton (1997–2009)
- Kevin McHenry (2009–2027)
- Colby Dockerty (2027-)

Kevin McHenry is set to retire after the 2026-2027 school year

== Academics ==
The school's mission statement is Dedicating ourselves to the development of the complete man, the well-rounded citizen. Every classroom and common area at St. Andrew's College is covered by a wireless network. The faculty is divided into 12 departments, those being Business, Computer Science and Engineering, Drama, English, Guidance and Career Education, Health and Physical Education, Mathematics, Modern Languages, Music, Science, Visual Arts, and World Studies.

The students have a broad selection of courses available to them from the fine arts, to the humanities, social sciences, science, and engineering. Many AP courses are also offered, for example AP Chemistry, AP Capstone, AP Calculus, AP Statistics, AP Economics, AP Biology, and AP Computer science, among others. SAC has a 100% university acceptance rate and graduates move on to post-secondary education around the world, including Canadian, American and British universities.

== Athletics ==
Sports are considered an essential part of school life and culture; 72 teams across 22 sports are offered by the school. St. Andrew's College is one of the original members of Ontario's "Little Big Four" (the others being Ridley College, Trinity College School, and Upper Canada College). The photographs of each year's representative teams line the walls along the first and second floors of the Bedard Athletic Centre. Sports are mandatory — all Upper School boys must participate in two out of three sports terms during the year, while Middle School students must participate in all three terms.

St. Andrew's has a tradition of sporting, as shown by its participation in both private and public school leagues and associations:

Private schools competition

- Little Big Four (L.B.F.) 1899–1968
- Independent School League (I.S.L.) 1968–1982
- Independent Schools Athletic Association (I.S.A.A.) 1982–1993
- Conference of Independent Schools Athletic Association (C.I.S.A.A.)1993–present
- Canadian Association of Independent Schools (C.A.I.S.) 1981–present

Public schools competition

- York Region Secondary Schools Athletic Association (Y.R.S.S.A.A.) 1971–1995
- Georgian Bay Secondary Schools Athletic Association (G.B.S.S.A.A.) 1973–1986
- Durham-York Secondary Schools Athletic Association (D.Y.S.S.A.A.) 1986–1995
- York Region Athletic Association (Y.R.A.A.) 1995–2004
- Ontario Federation of School Athletic Associations (O.F.S.A.A.) 1948–present

St. Andrew's College has representative teams for the following sports, in addition to the Craze Sports intramural program:

=== Fall ===
- Football
- Cross country
- Soccer
- Volleyball

=== Winter ===
- Alpine skiing
- Basketball
- Biathlon
- Curling
- Fencing
- Hockey
- Nordic skiing
- Squash
- Swimming

=== Spring ===
- Badminton
- Baseball
- Cricket
- Golf
- Lacrosse
- Rugby
- Tennis
- Track and field
- Triathlon
- Ultimate Frisbee

== School events ==
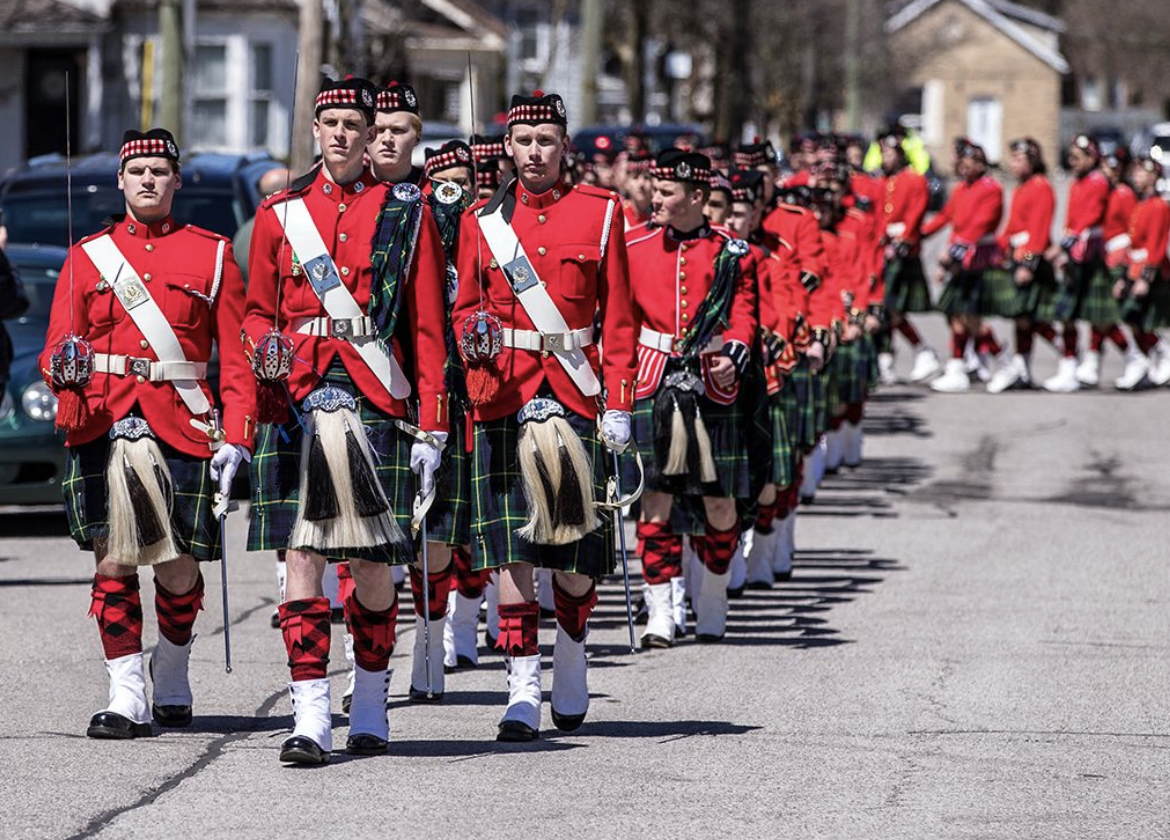
SAC cadets marching in the annual Church Parade in 2019

Each year, St. Andrew's hosts events that are unique to the School. Some of these activities and events involve the entire student body, while others are directed towards alumni and their friends and families. These events serve different purposes, some of which are integral to the School's identity while others are used for fundraising causes.

- Annual Cadet Inspection – the annual Cadet Inspection is mandatory for the entire student body at St. Andrew's. The Inspection is usually held in April and invites prominent representatives from all across Canada to inspect the School's Cadet Corps. A tradition that finds its root since 1906, the annual inspection is integral to the School's identity and preserving both the School's Scottish background, and the history of the Cadet Corps.
- An Andrean Christmas – The annual Andrean Christmas is held at Roy Thompson Hall in December and showcases the School's musicians and singers. Like the annual Cadet Inspection, An Andrean Christmas is a mandatory event for all students, and traditionally, Old Boys will return to attend the performance and join in the singing of Amazing Grace and the Dorset Carol. It replaces the tradition of an annual Carol Service in the holiday season.
- Focus Festival of the Arts – This program is a three-day festival of plays, a film festival, visual arts, music, and social events for students, parents, and guests. Boys who have never been involved in drama or on the stage before are encouraged to participate by writing their own plays, directing, producing or acting in performances large and small while musicians give concerts throughout the festival.
- Annual Fall Play – An annual Broadway-level play or musical put on for parents, students, and staff during the month of November in the Wirth Theatre.
- Celtic Concert – This musical offering showcases the School's Pipes and Drums and often features the other school bands, soloists, percussionists and dancers. It highlights traditional Celtic music, military band music, and some show tunes.
- Homecoming – an annual gathering of all St. Andrew's alumni in September. Held in conjunction with the 5, 10, 15, 20, 25, 30, 35, 40, 45 reunion dinners, this annual gathering is for the entire Andrean community. The Homecoming celebration includes games for the children in the Quad and in the Great Hall, and various sports competitions, culminating in the annual 1st Football match against rivals UCC on the Yuill Turf Field.
- MacPherson Tournament – an annual hockey event where the St. Andrew's varsity hockey team competes with hockey teams from other top schools for the MacPherson Cup. The cup is named after three Andreans: Lloyd MacPherson, Jim Hamilton and Bob Meagher, all of whom loved hockey with passion and contributed greatly to the St. Andrew's hockey team. The tournament has a North American flavour, hosting schools from Saskatchewan, New Brunswick, New Hampshire, Massachusetts, Quebec, Indiana, Pennsylvania, Ohio, Florida, New York, Nova Scotia and Michigan as well as a variety of regions in Ontario.
- Prize Day – Prize Day is the culmination of the School's academic year, and features a grand assortment of awards and prizes earned by the School's students, in addition to celebrating the graduates. There are two ceremonies, one for the Middle School and one for the Upper School.
- St. Andrew's Day Dinner/Luncheon – every November, a traditional St. Andrew's Day meal is held, complete with Haggis. All students attend, wearing their kilts for the occasion. Like the annual Cadet Inspection, St. Andrew's Day celebrations has taken place since the inception of the School and is integral to the preservation of the School's Scottish traditions.
- Spring Smash – every May, the senior business classes organize a carnival of sorts, where both Middle School and Upper School students are provided a variety of fun activities such as water slides, bouncy castles, a dunk tank for dunking teachers in, and much more. There are also mandatory sports tournaments for house points, and students are given a choice between ball hockey, basketball, soccer, among others. Upper School participates in sports prior to an outdoor BBQ and then the carnival, whereas the Middle School participates in the carnival before their outdoor BBQ and sports.

== Students ==
St. Andrew's College is divided into the Middle School (grades 5–8), and the Upper School (grades 9–12). More than half of the student population live in boarding. Upper School day boys from York Region are a part of the four day houses: Ramsey, Laidlaw, Smith or Perrier. Macdonald House is the home to all grade 5–9 boarders, and some select grade 11's who are designated house captains and act as 'big brothers'. Macdonald House is named after the MacDonald family (J. K. MacDonald and J. K. MacDonald II both served as Board Chair and Bruce MacDonald was Headmaster).

The remaining Upper School boarders live in the remaining 3 boarding houses:

- Memorial House — named after the soldiers who died during World War I and World War II.
- Flavelle House — named after Sir Joseph Flavelle.
- Sifton House — named after the School's prolific alumni and donors, the Sifton family, descended from Sir Clifford Sifton.

Upper School Clans:

- MacPherson Clan, Flavelle House
- Buchanan Clan, Memorial House
- Chattan Clan, Smith House
- Ramsay Clan, Ramsey House
- Robertson Clan, Laidlaw House
- Stewart Clan, Sifton House
- Craig Clan, Perrier House
- MacDonald Clan, MacDonald House

The programs for Middle School students are generally independent of those for Upper School. Each Middle School student is also part of a clan, where they participate in various activities to earn Clan Points. The clans are Douglas, Montrose, Wallace, and Bruce.

In addition, St. Andrew's students hail from an array of different backgrounds. Nearly 50% of the boarding community is international, coming from such countries and regions as Bermuda, Korea, Bahamas, Mexico, Hong Kong, Japan, Taiwan, the Philippines, Germany, Indonesia, Spain, Bermuda, China, Nepal and the United States to name a few. The remaining half are from various provinces across Canada.

== Facilities ==
=== Early 2000's expansion ===
In 1999 the architectural firm KPMB headed a project which consisted of planning for a new middle school and parking lot on the established campus. From 2000 to 2003, the same architectural firm had an additional project which included the addition of a middle school wing onto an existing building, a parking lot and outdoor spaces and alterations to the existing college, originally constructed in 1926.

=== McLaughlin Hall renovation ===
In late 2019, The Dalton Company executed a project which saw the complete internal-reconstruction of all 3 floors within the McLaughlin Hall science building. Covering a total area around 26,000 sq ft of space. The original facility was constructed in 1970, also by The Dalton Company and they were invited back 50 years later to renovate the building. In the CAD $10 million project, the entire interior of the building was reduced back to the core structure, and reconstructed with state of the art facilities for science and technology. Included are university-level chemistry and biology labs, as well as a two-story maker-space and robotics/computer science classrooms. The newly renovated McLaughlin Hall also houses a Foucault Pendulum on display which spans vertically through all 3 stories of the building. The pendulum was originally added in 1971 as it was donated following the death of a young student and was re-fitted to the new building.

=== La Brier Family Arena ===
The La Brier Family Arena is a multi-purpose hockey arena which also houses fitness facilities located on the St. Andrews College campus. It began construction in 2013 after a CAD $5 million donation from the La Brier Family of which it is named after. It was completed in 2014 and was officially opened on September 20, 2014, and serves as the home base for the school's hockey team, the Saints.

=== Academic facilities ===
Coulter Hall – A three-floor classroom building opened in 1962—the second and third floor is designated for use by the Math and English departments, respectively. The first floor (or basement) houses the office for the mathematics faculty, while also serving as a link between the north end of the Staunton Gallery, and the basements of Dunlap Hall and the CLIP building.

McLaughlin Hall – A three-story wing connecting the Bedard Athletic Centre, Coulter Hall, and Rogers Hall, originally opened in 1971, it underwent a massive renovation between 2019 and 2021 and serves as the science building with facilities for chemistry, physics, biology, and is fitted with a 2 story maker space and computer science classrooms.

Rogers Hall – A classroom wing built in 2003, all Middle School classes take place here, save for music and art. It is named after lead donor Dem Rogers '59.

The Center for Leadership, Innovation, and Performance (CLIP) – A fairly new 3-level addition to the campus (2015), which is home to the Business, Geography, Theatre, and Music departments. Music classes and rehearsals occur in CLIP, while the Wirth Theatre (modelled after Stratford's Festival Theatre) is home to the Theatre department. The Wirth Theatre is supported by the Reininger Rehearsal space under it and is also connected to the main auditorium which seats over 400 people for school assemblies and ceremonies.

Towers Library – Named after Graham Towers, the first governor of the Bank of Canada, and an Old Boy.

=== Student and school facilities ===
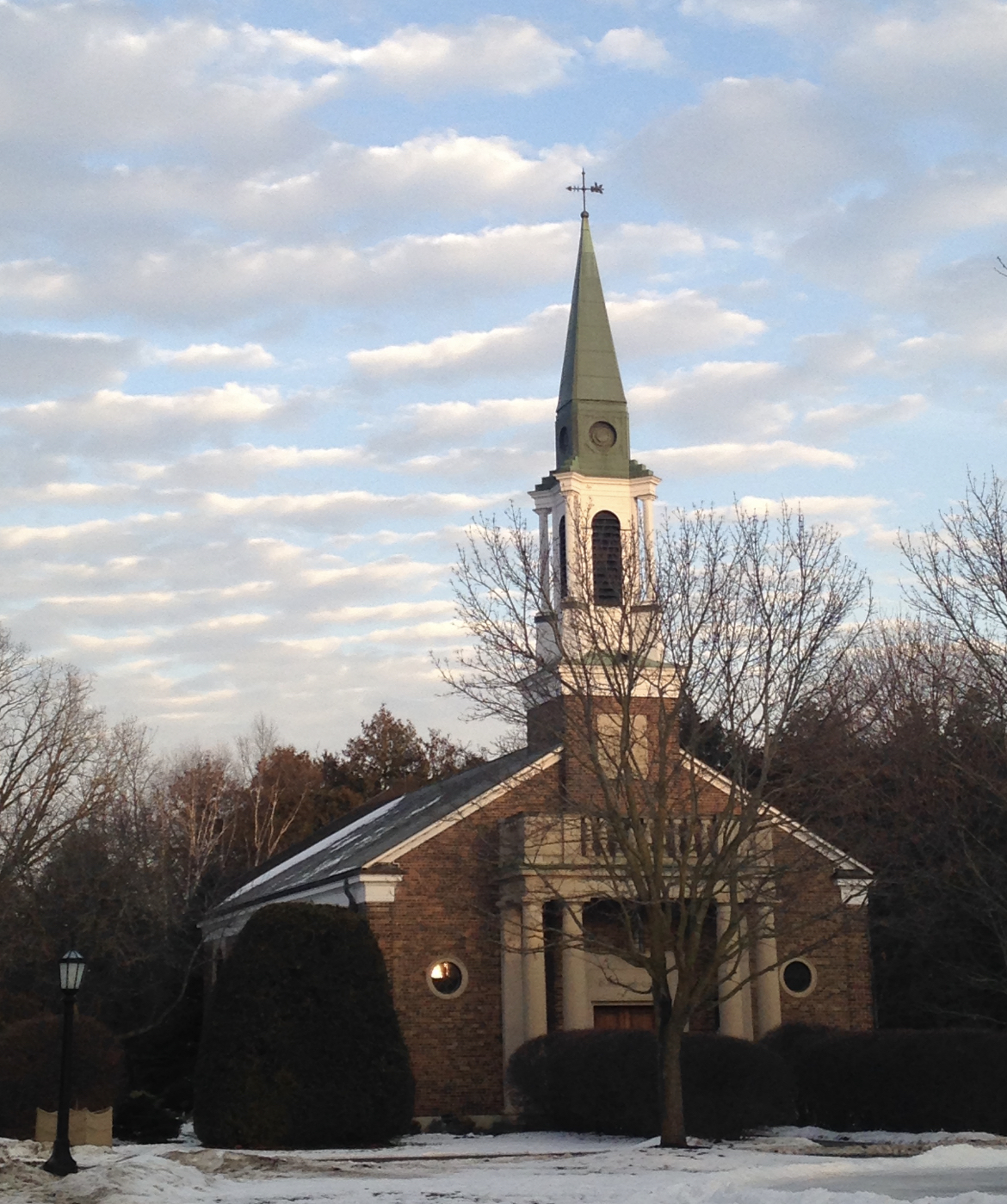
St. Andrew's College Memorial Chapel

Cole Hall – The dining hall where breakfast, lunch, and dinner are served daily. It is also the site for formal meals and ceremonies. The Cadet offices are located in the basement of Cole Hall.

Memorial Chapel – Built in 1931, it is the School's Chapel, and is dedicated to the Andreans who fought and died during World War I and World War II. The donation was made by Sir Joseph Flavelle, who also donated funds to establish Flavelle House. Morning services and special services such as the Remembrance Day Service are held in the Memorial Chapel.

Dunlap Hall – This is one of the original four buildings on campus. Today it houses the School's administration. The first floor includes Head of School's office, admission office, administration office, and university counselling. It is also connects to the library. The second floor houses the alumni and advancement office and the business office. In the basement are the day boy lockers as well as the multi-faith prayer room.

Staunton Gallery – A now-converted outdoor courtyard, it is a popular place for students to congregate, and was dedicated to departing Headmaster Ted Staunton. It connects to the Wirth Art Gallery, Dunlap Hall, Ketchum Auditorium, Coulter Hall, CLIP, McLaughlin Hall, and Rogers Hall.

Bedard Athletic Centre – This building, opened in 1979 (with an addition in 1990) and named after the School's sixth Headmaster, Robert Bedard, is home to many of SAC's athletic needs. It houses one of the two gymnasiums on campus, as well as 6 international squash courts, a 25-metre six lane indoor swimming pool, a fitness and weight training facility, 10 locker rooms, and a fully staffed sports injury/athletic therapist clinic. The Modern Languages Department teaches French and Spanish in the second-floor classrooms of the building, with Health and Physical Education classes taking place in the gymnasium. Since September 2022, it also houses a donated golf simulator.

Yuill Family Gymnasium – The main athletic facility, attached to Roger Hall, for the Middle School and after-school Upper School sports practices. It is also home to a rock wall. Upper School June exams are held here. It was named after Old Boy Bill Yuill '57.

Yuill Family Athletic Complex – A collection of sports fields for the school, the highlight being the synthetic football and soccer turf field, complete with seating for 800, press box, and scoreboard. Surrounding the field is a 6-lane regulation track. The complex also includes a regulation-size baseball diamond, batting cages, warm-up mounds, and multipurpose athletic courts (including tennis and basketball). The complex was completed in Spring of 2012 and is named for its lead donor, Old Boy Bill Yuill '57.

== Notable faculty ==
- Robert Bédard (tennis), the sixth Headmaster, was Canada's top-ranked tennis player from 1955 to 1965 (also the last Canadian to have won the Canadian Open (men's singles), now Roger's Cup)
- Thomas Cossitt, a former member of the House of Commons of Canada
- Thomas Hockin, the fifth Headmaster, was a professor in political science and a renowned politician under the Progressive Conservative government. He went on to be the chief executive officer at the Investment Funds Institute of Canada, and in 2009 became the Executive Director of the International Monetary Fund
- Frank Miller, former Premier of Ontario (Progressive Conservative, February–June 1985)
- James Macdonnell, teacher at the school from 1904–1914. Later a member of parliament from 1945–1962.
- Colonel Albert Gooderham, Board of Governors
- Colonel Henry Cockshutt, Board of Governors
- Major Frederick A. Tilston VC, cadet instructor

== Notable alumni ==
St. Andrew's notable alumni, known colloquially at the school as 'Old Boys', include:

=== Arts ===
- Stephen Amell (2000) – Canadian actor
- Timothy Findley, OC (1950) – author
- Lawren Harris, CC (1903) – Group of Seven Painter
- George Nozuka (2005) – Canadian/American Pop and R&B singer/songwriter
- Justin Nozuka (2007) – Canadian/American Folk singer/songwriter
- Kiefer Sutherland (1984) – Canadian actor

=== Business ===
- Anthony S. Fell (1958) – Businessman, Order of Canada
- John A. McDougald (1927?) – Businessman, Argus Corporation
- Rob McEwen, CC (1968) – Prolific entrepreneur
- Graham Towers, CC (1913) – Former Governor of the Bank of Canada
- Austin Cotterell Taylor OBE (1907?) – Mining Executive
- James Goldsmith – French-British business man and politician

=== Media ===
- Jack McClelland, OC (1940) – Publisher
- Alastair Sweeny PhD (1965?) – Historian, publisher

=== Military ===
- MGen. Charles S.L. Hertzberg (1901) – Chief Engineer of the First Canadian Army, and commander of the Canadian Engineering Corps during the Second World War. Prominent engineer with many works.
- MGen. Halfdan Hertzberg (1904) – Commandant of Royal Military College (1940–1944)
- Brigadier Andrew Eastman Duncanson (1907) - WW1 veteran, commanded the Royal Grenadiers 1930-34, Assistant Adjutant & Quartermaster General of the 8th Canadian Division 1942-43, commandant of the Ordnance Corps Training Centre 1943-45
- Colonel Robert James Gill (1907) - Cadet Commanding Officer 1907, WW1 veteran, Commanding Officer of the Brockville Rifles
- Capt. James Creswell Auld (1912) - 16th Canadian Field Artillery, one of only 16 Canadians to be awarded the Military Cross and two bars
- S/Lt Langley Smith (1912) - First World War flying ace, awarded the Distinguished Flying Cross
- Lt. Maurice E. (Mike) Malone (1913) – 15th (48th Highlanders) Battalion, CEF who was killed in action at the Battle of Mont Sorrel on June 3, 1916. The Malone playing field at the college is named after him.
- Brigadier Ronald E. A. Morton (1916) - grandson of William Dillon Otter, commanding officer of the Fort Garry Horse during the Normandy Landings, commanded the Canadian Military Mission in Japan during the Korean War
- Brigadier General James Edwin Ganong (1920) - commanded the 4th Infantry Brigade during the Normandy Campaign, commanding officer of the 48th Highlanders from 1945–46
- Lt-Colonel William Clement Dick (1930) - wounded at Dieppe, commanded the Lanark and Renfrew Scottish in Italy 1943-44, Canadian military attaché in Washington 1946, director of the Canadian Army Staff College 1947-50
- Brigadier Arthur Gerald Chubb (1931) - commanded the 28th Armoured Regiment 1944-45, commanded Strathcona’s Horse 1949-51, Canadian advisor to the International Control Commission in Vietnam 1966-67
- Col. Frank McEachren (1936?) – Honorary Colonel of the 48th Highlanders and aide-de-camp to six Lieutenant Governors of Ontario
- T/Lt. Jack Draper Perrin Jr. (1934) – served in the Royal Navy during the Italian Campaign, met with Pope Pius XII during the liberation of Rome.
- LCdr Joseph J. Macbrien (1942) - only Royal Canadian Naval Aviator to fly combat missions during the Korean War, awarded the US Distinguished Flying Cross
- Col. John M. Lowndes (1944) – Commanding Officer of the 48th Highlanders (1964–67), Honorary ADC to the Governor General (1967–76), Commander of the Toronto Militia District (1974–76), Honorary Colonel of the 48th Highlanders (1988–92)
- Major General Gary Rapmund (1945) - US Army Medical Corps, assistant Surgeon General for Army Research and Development
- Brigadier General James A. Cotter (1951) - commanded the Canadian U.N. Mission in Cyprus in 1980
- Colonel Ian A. Purdie CD (1955) - Aide-de-camp to the Lieutenant Governor of Ontario (1992-2003), commanding officer of the Lincoln & Welland Regiment (1974-78 & 1986-88), director of the Royal Canadian Military Institute, Canadian Airborne Forces Association, Canadian Infantry Association, and Royal Niagara Military Institute.

=== Politics ===
- Clarence Wallace (1913) - 18th Lieutenant Governor of British Columbia (1950-55)
- Thomas Cossitt (1945?) – A member of the House of Commons of Canada.
- John Crosbie PC, OC, QC (1949) – Politician, and the 12th Lieutenant-Governor of Newfoundland and Labrador (2008–2013).
- Alan Milliken Heisey Sr. (1946) – North York Alderman and publisher.
- Peter Hyndman (1959) – Member of the Legislative Assembly of British Columbia (1979–1983)
- Vincent Massey, PC, CH, CC (1905) – philanthropist and 18th Governor General of Canada (first Canadian born; 1952–59).
- J.A.D. McCurdy (1903) – Member of the Aerial Experiment Association, inventor of the aileron, and the 19th Lieutenant Governor of Nova Scotia (1947–1952).
- Roy McMurtry (1950) – Politician and Chief Justice of Ontario (1996–2007).
- Frank Moores (1951) – Former Premier of Newfoundland and Labrador (1971–1979).
- Edward Roberts CM, QC (1958) – The 11th Lieutenant-Governor of Newfoundland and Labrador (2002–2008).
- Alvin Yeung (1999) – Former Hong Kong pro-democracy legislator and leader of the pro-democracy Civic Party, remanded under the Hong Kong national security law for participating in the 2020 Hong Kong pro-democracy primaries

=== Science ===
- Gilbert de B. Robinson (1924) – Mathematician

=== Sports ===
- Morgan Barron (2017) – hockey player for the Winnipeg Jets
- Tyler Black – professional baseball player for the Milwaukee Brewers
- Thaine Carter (2005) – former linebacker with the Winnipeg Blue Bombers
- Jaxon Cover (2025) – hockey player for the London Knights
- Michael Del Zotto (2007) – former professional hockey player
- Warren Foegele (2014) – hockey player currently playing for the Los Angeles Kings
- Steve Gainey (1995) – former hockey player for the Phoenix Coyotes
- Peter Godber (2013) – football player, currently playing for the Saskatchewan Roughriders
- Greg Hotham (1976) – former hockey player for the Pittsburgh Penguins and Toronto Maple Leafs
- Gord MacFarlane (1975) – retired hockey player
- Gregor MacKellar (2017) – professional football player for the Toronto Argonauts
- Karl McCartney (2005) – former football player
- Alex Newhook (2019) – hockey player for the Montreal Canadiens
- Tyler Sikura (2010) – hockey player
- Dylan Sikura (2014) – hockey player, drafted by the Chicago Blackhawks
- Brad Smith (2010) – football player, played for the Edmonton Eskimos and the Montreal Alouettes
- Fraser Sopik (2015) – professional football player for the Toronto Argonauts
- Robert Thomas (2017) – hockey player for the St. Louis Blues
- Gabe Wallace – professional football player for the Winnipeg Blue Bombers
- Harry Watson – Olympic gold medalist and Hockey Hall of Fame inductee
