= Regency Acres Public School =

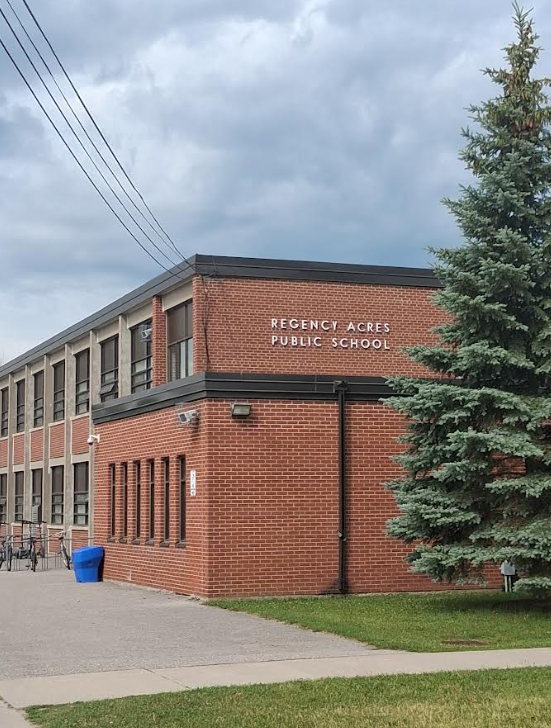

Location
- 123 Murray Drive; Canada, Ontario

Information
- Motto: Truth, Courage and Loyalty
- Established: 1960
- School district: York Region District School Board
- Principal: Karen Mell
- Mascot: Griffin

Regency Acres Public School is a school managed by the York Region District School Board and located in Aurora, Ontario, Canada. It is situated near Confederation Park, a local playground.

== History ==
Regency Acres was opened in 1960 and at the time had seven rooms.

In 1965 the school expanded due to population in Aurora increasing, later in 1975, 1981, and 1999 it went through major additions.

In 2016 the school was one of many of the schools to participate in the 2016 Farm to School Grants.

In 2018 students wanted part of Highland gate to go to a dog park which it is unknown whether it was ever created. The same year it held its first ever planting party which was to educate children about various things such as healthy food, how to grow vegetables and fruits, and to develop teamwork skills.

In 2020 Karen Mell was assigned the role of Principal in the school after serving as vice president for four years.
