= Niels Hertzberg =

Norwegian politician (1759–1841)

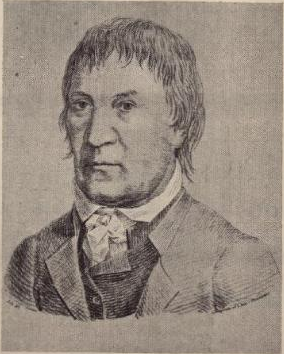
Niels Hertzberg

Niels Hertzberg (13 August 1759 – 21 October 1841) was a Norwegian priest and politician.

He was born at Finnaas in Hordaland, Norway. He was the eldest son of vicar Peder Harboe Hertzberg (1728–1802) and Christiane Winding (1737–1801). He was first married, from November 1786, to Maria Elisabeth Weinwich (1759–1818). After her death, he married Anne Christine Egede Thomsen (1789–1860). His son, Nils Christian Egede Hertzberg (1827–1911) was a theologian, educator and politician. His daughter Maja Elisabeth Weinwich Hertzberg (1824–1881) was the wife of author Claus Pavels Riis (1826–1886). He was also a great-grandfather of Canadian Major Generals Charles Hertzberg (1886–1944) and Halfdan Hertzberg.

He attended Bergen Cathedral School from 1776 to 1778, and graduated from the University of Copenhagen with a cand.theol. degree in 1783. He pursued an ecclesiastic career as priest at Kvinnherad Church from 1786 and then as vicar of Kinsarvik Church and Ullensvang Church from 1804 to his death. From 1810 to 1832 he also doubled as dean of Hardanger og Voss deanery. He was elected to the very first Parliament of Norway in 1814 as a representative of Søndre Bergenhus Amt (now part of Vestland).

He was also a topographic writer. He was a fellow of the Royal Norwegian Society of Sciences and Letters from 1806, and was decorated as a Knight of the Order of the Dannebrog in 1811. He died in October 1841 in Ullensvang.
