= Madras War Cemetery =

Cemetery in India

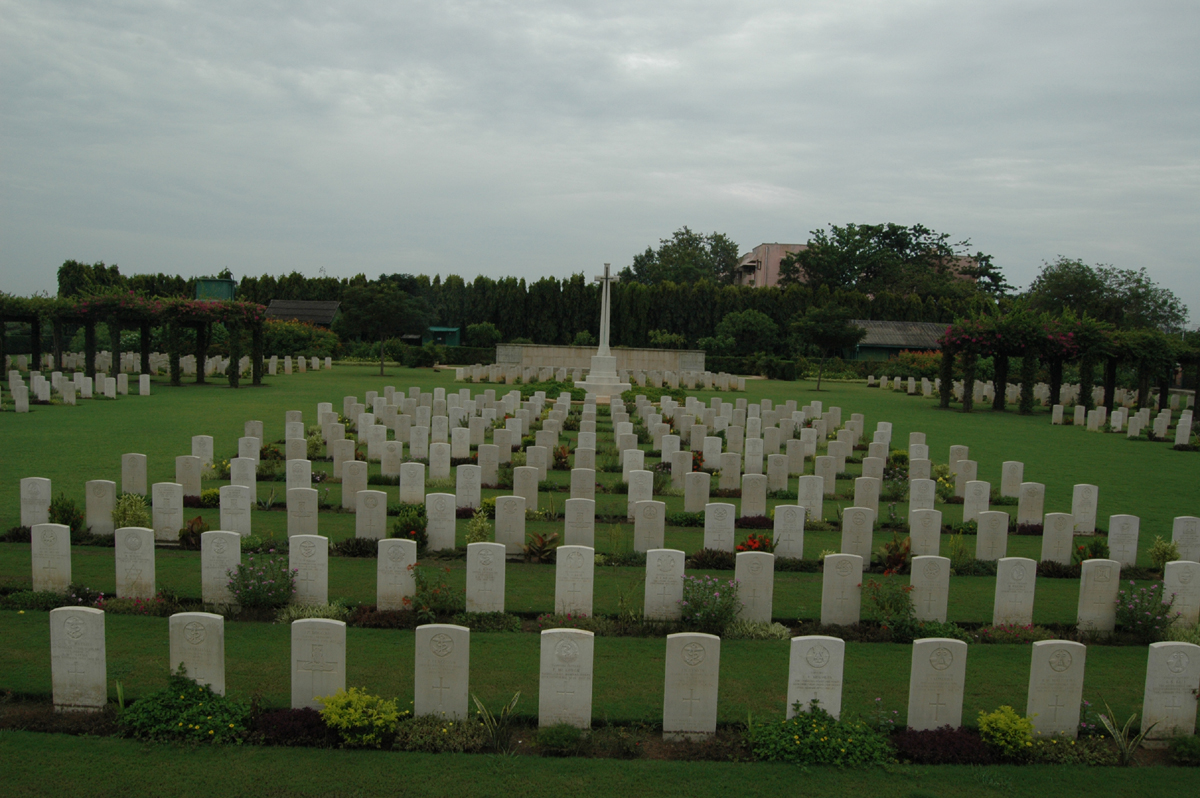
- Madras War Cemetery
- Interactive map of Madras War Cemetery

Details
- Established: 1952; 74 years ago
- Location: Nandambakkam, Chennai
- Country: India
- Coordinates: 13.0143°N 80.1944°E
- Owned by: Commonwealth War Graves Commission; Government of India
- No. of graves: 856

Madras War Cemetery is located in Nandambakkam, Madras (Chennai), Tamil Nadu, India. It was created to receive Second World War graves from civil and cantonment cemeteries in the south and east of India where their permanent maintenance could not be assured.

== Description ==
Madras War Cemetery is located on Mount-Poonamallee Road, Nandambakkam, about 5 km (3.1 miles) from the airport and 1 km (0.62 miles) from St. Thomas Mount. The cemetery is open to the public.

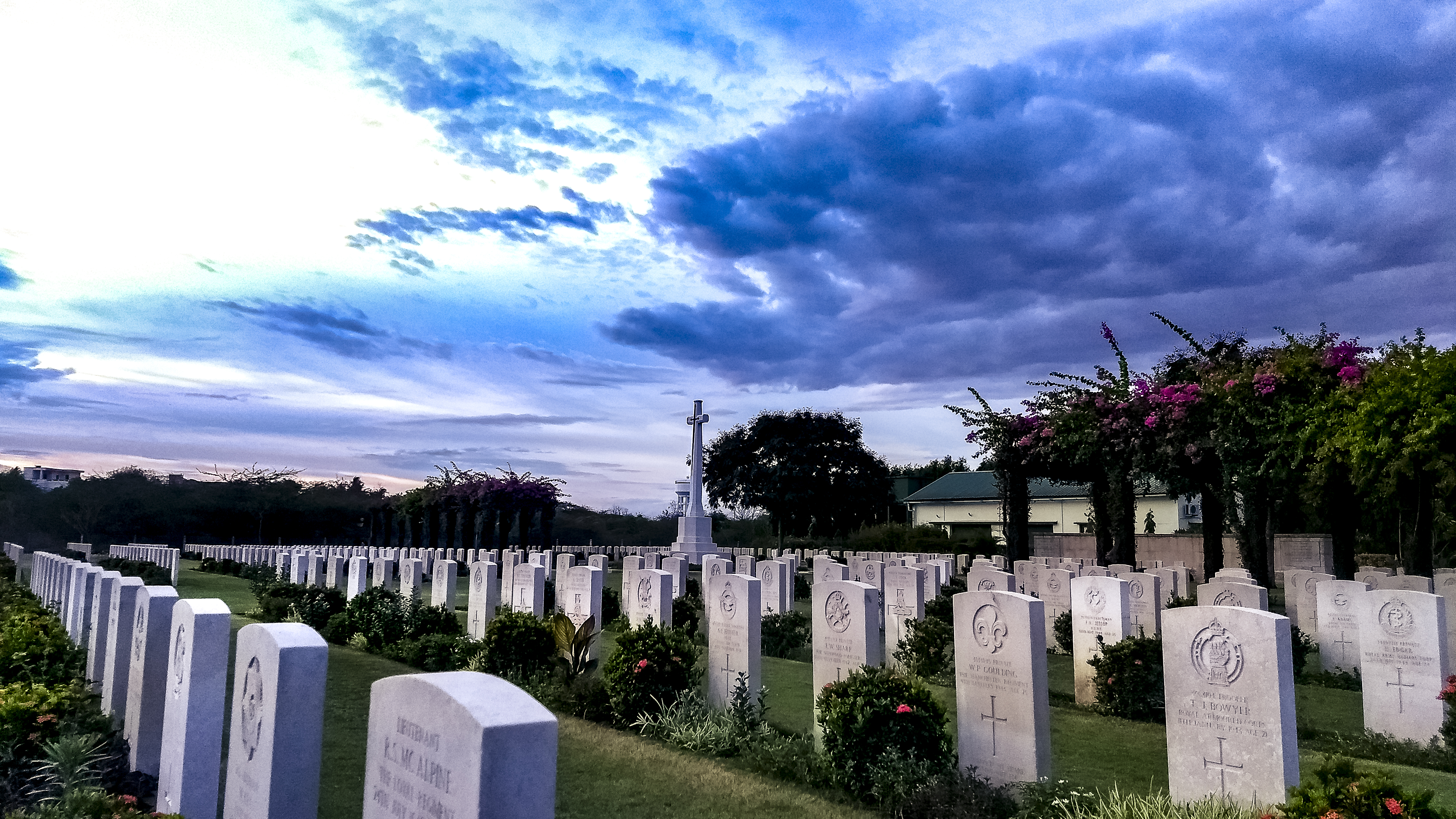
Inside view of the cemetery

The cemetery occupies 2.75 acres (1.11 hectares) and contains the graves of 856 Commonwealth service people who died in the Second World War. It was established in 1952 by the Imperial War Graves Commission, which is now known as the Commonwealth War Graves Commission (CWGC), to pay tribute to the people of the Commonwealth nations who died in military service. The cemetery is maintained by the CWGC in partnership with Government of India. The cemetery is given to the CWGC under perpetual lease by the Defence Ministry.

The cemetery also includes Madras 1914–1918 War Memorial, which is situated at the rear of the site and is styled on the lines of a lawn cemetery. The memorial, which does not contain any bodies, bears plaques with the names of British and Commonwealth soldiers who died in both World Wars and the inscription; "Their name liveth for evermore". It bears the names of more than 1,039 servicemen who died during the First World War and whose remains lie in many civil and cantonment cemeteries across India, where it is not possible to maintain their graves in perpetuity. Commonwealth nationals whose remains were buried include 14 Australians and 5 New Zealanders.

== See also ==
- Victory War Memorial
- Delhi War Cemetery
- Victory Tunnel
