= Charles Hertzberg =

Canadian military engineer and general (1886–1944)

Charles S. L. Hertzberg
- Born: Charles Sumner Lund Hertzberg; 12 June 1886; Toronto, Ontario, Canada
- Died: 10 January 1944 (aged 57); New Delhi, India
- Burial place: Delhi War Cemetery, India
- Relatives: Major General Halfdan Hertzberg (brother)
- Military career
- Allegiance: Canada
- Branch: Canadian Army
- Service years: 1903–1944
- Rank: Major General
- Commands: Chief Engineer First Canadian Army; Chief Engineer I Canadian Corps; Chief Engineer 7 Corps
- Conflicts: First World War; Battle of Vimy Ridge (WIA); Russian Civil War; Second World War
- Awards: Companion of the Order of the Bath; Military Cross; Volunteer Officers Decoration

Major General Charles Sumner Lund Hertzberg CB, MC, VD (12 June 1886 – 10 January 1944) was a prominent engineer and senior commander in the Canadian Army during the Second World War. Hertzberg commanded the Royal Canadian Engineering Corps as chief engineer, First Canadian Army. He was appointed Companion of the Order of the Bath, and died at age 57 after contracting smallpox on a special assignment in India.

== Early life and family ==
Charles Hertzberg was born in Toronto, Ontario, Canada on 12 June 1886, to Anton Lund Hertzberg and Helen Eliza Hertzberg. He had two brothers - Major General H.F.H. Hertzberg, CB, CMG, DSO, MC of the Canadian Engineers and Lieutenant O. P. Hertzberg, MC of the C.R.T. He was descended from a distinguished military family in Norway, and was the great-grandson of Niels Hertzberg. Hertzberg was educated at St. Andrew's College in Aurora, Ontario, between 1899 and 1901 before earning an engineering degree at University of Toronto in 1905. He joined 2nd Field Company Canadian Engineers (CE) in 1903, and was commissioned in 1904. Before heading overseas to fight in the First World War, Hertzberg worked as a consulting engineer a career he continued post-war.

His brother, H.F.H. Hertzberg, also reached the rank of Major General. The Hertzbergs were the only brother-duo to hold the rank of general at the same time in the Canadian army.

He married Jessie Alexander Hertzberg, of Toronto. His sons (Major, Canadian Army) Peter Alexander and (Commander, RCN) John Sumner were born in 1921 and 1924 respectively.

== First World War and Siberian Expedition ==
Hertzberg went overseas in 1916 and saw action in France as a Captain of the 7th Field Company of the Royal Canadian Engineers. He suffered a severe chest wounded at Vimy Ridge in 1917 and was awarded the Military Cross in January of that year. The citation for the medal reads:

For conspicuous gallantry in action. He displayed great courage and determination on three separate occasions when digging advanced trenches under heavy fire. On another occasion he established a strong point on an exposed flank.

Deemed permanently unfit for any service, he was sent home in June 1917. He then served as Adjutant of the Spadina Military Hospital in Toronto.

He managed to make his way back into action in October 1918 at Vladivostok, where he fought with the Canadian Siberian Expeditionary Force as a major, with the title of Senior Engineering Officer. Here he fought the Bolsheviks and was awarded the Slovak Republic's Croix de Guerre for his services in Siberia. He served until the Force demobilized in June 1919.

== Military involvement in the interwar years ==
In the interwar years Hertzberg remained active in the volunteer militia, (he was never a career soldier).He commanded the Second Field Company and later the No. 2 District Engineers in Toronto. He also served as Aide-de-Camp to Herbert Alexander Bruce, 15th Lieutenant-Governor of Ontario.

== Civilian life and private practice ==
Between the wars Hertzberg built a large structural engineering practice and helped build a number of landmark structures in Toronto, including the original Canadian Bank of Commerce head office, which was at the time (and for three decades) the tallest building in the Commonwealth. Hertzberg co-founded the civil engineering consulting firm James, Loudon and Hertzberg. He then broke away from that firm to form a firm specialising in structural engineering: Harkness, Loudon and Hertzberg, which later became Harkness and Hertzberg, a large and prominent Toronto practice.

Hertzberg's buildings include:

- The East Wing of the Ontario Legislative Building
- Canada Life Building
- Sun Life Building
- Commerce Court
- Fort York Armory
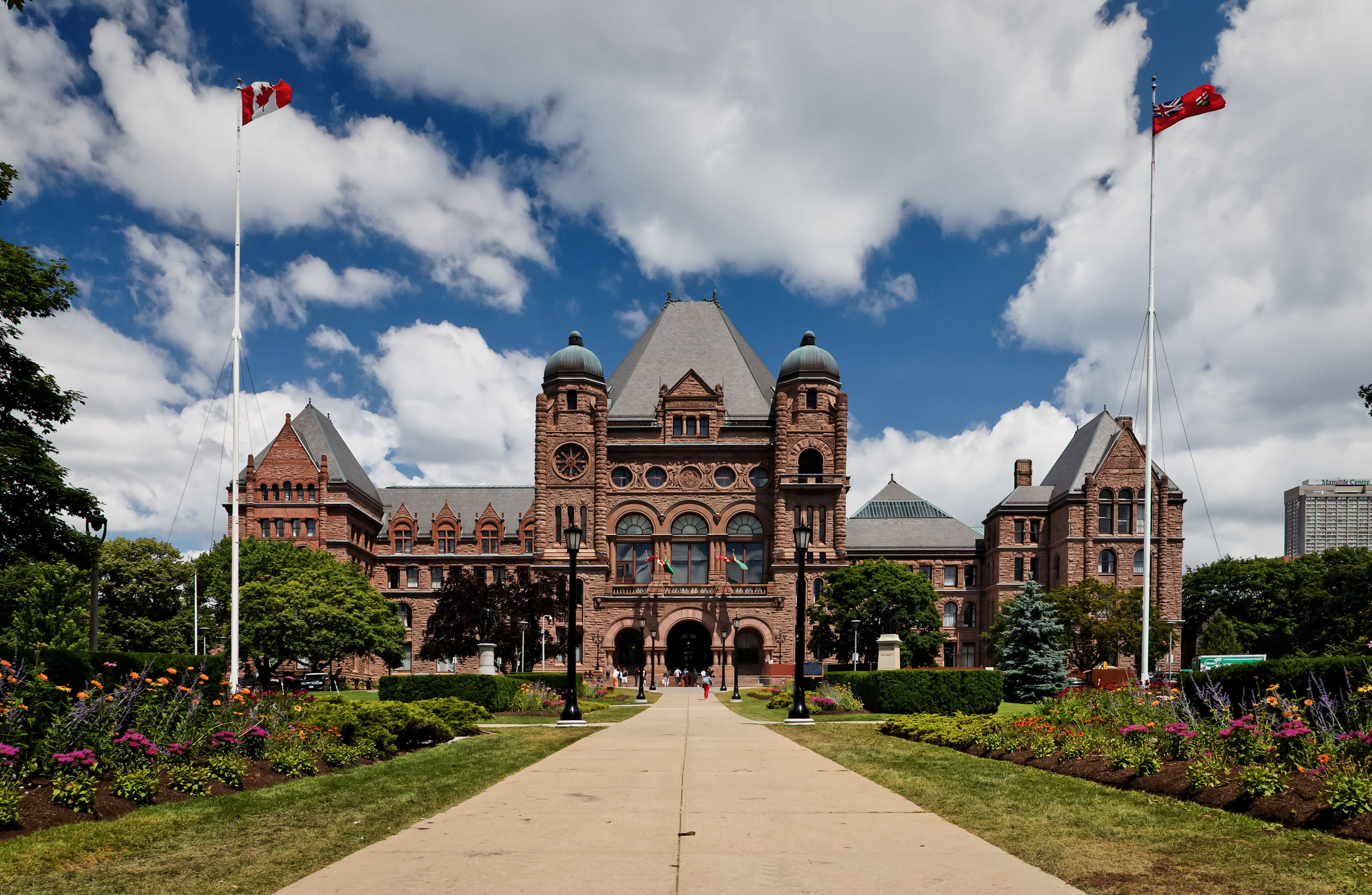
The Ontario Legislative Building

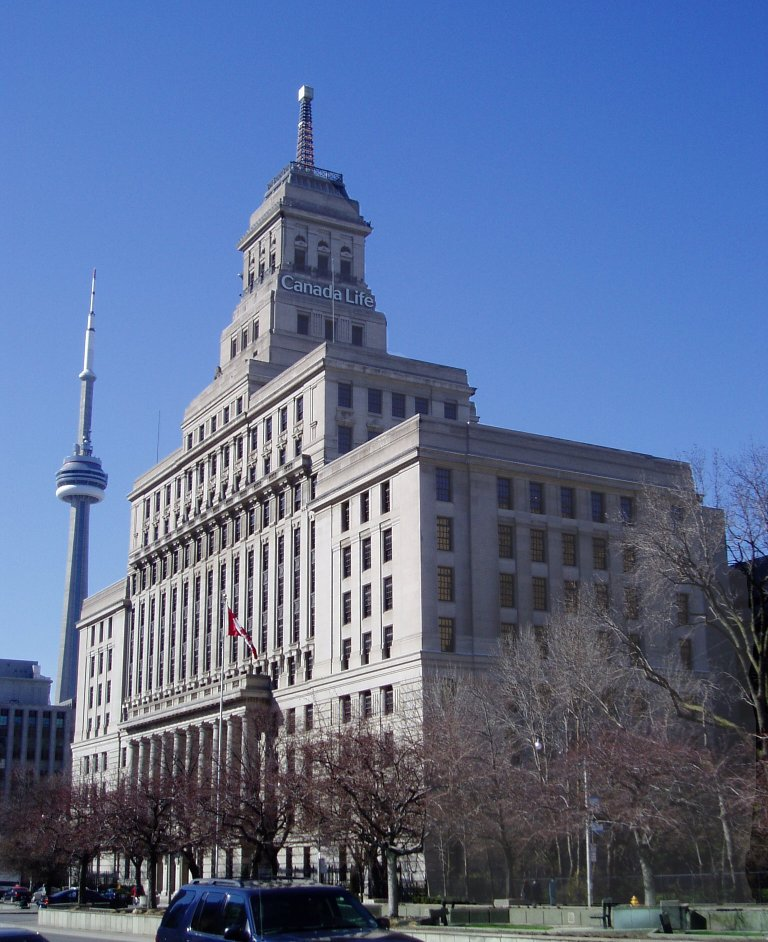
Canada Life Building in Toronto

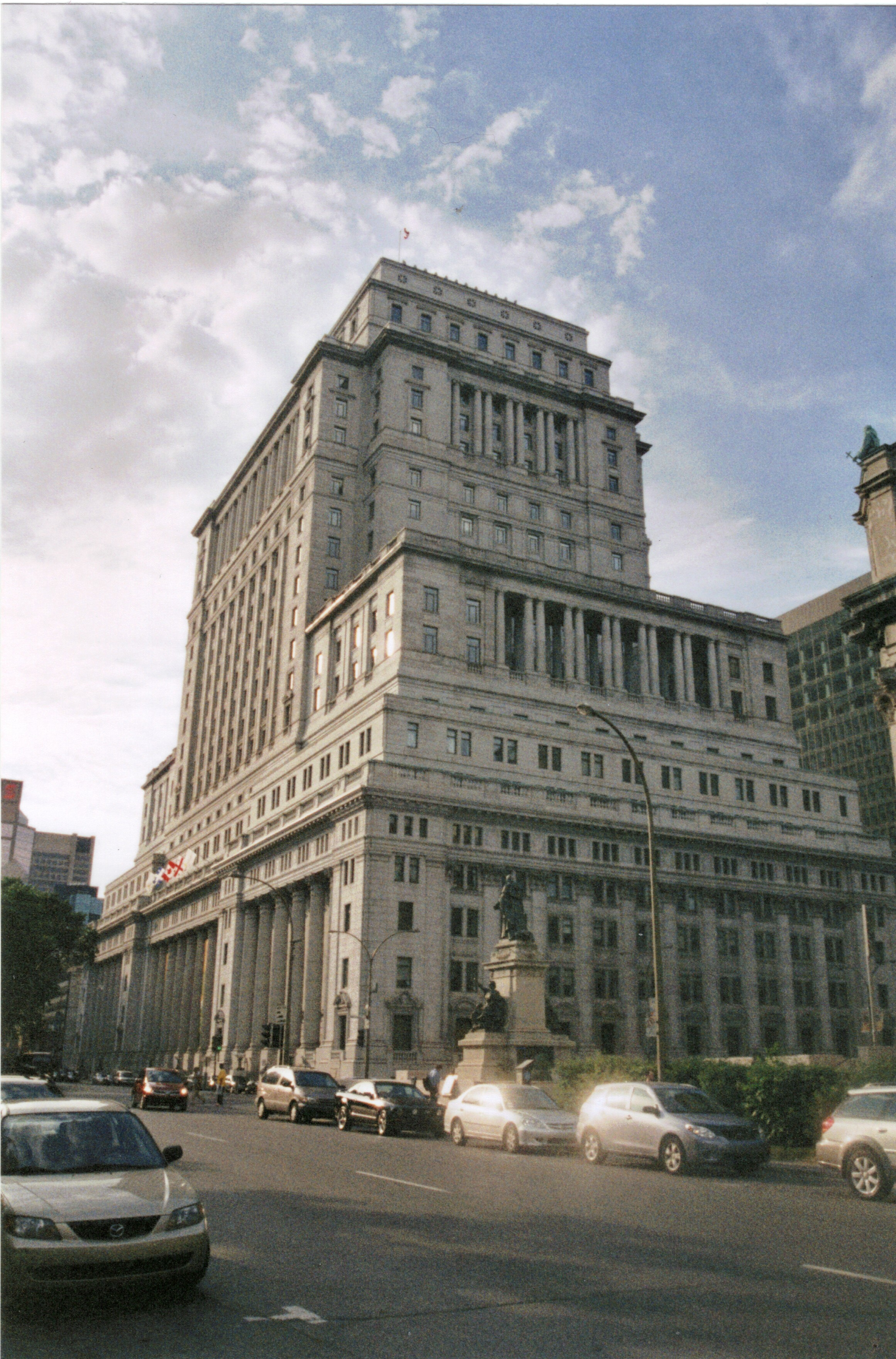
Sun Life Building in Montreal

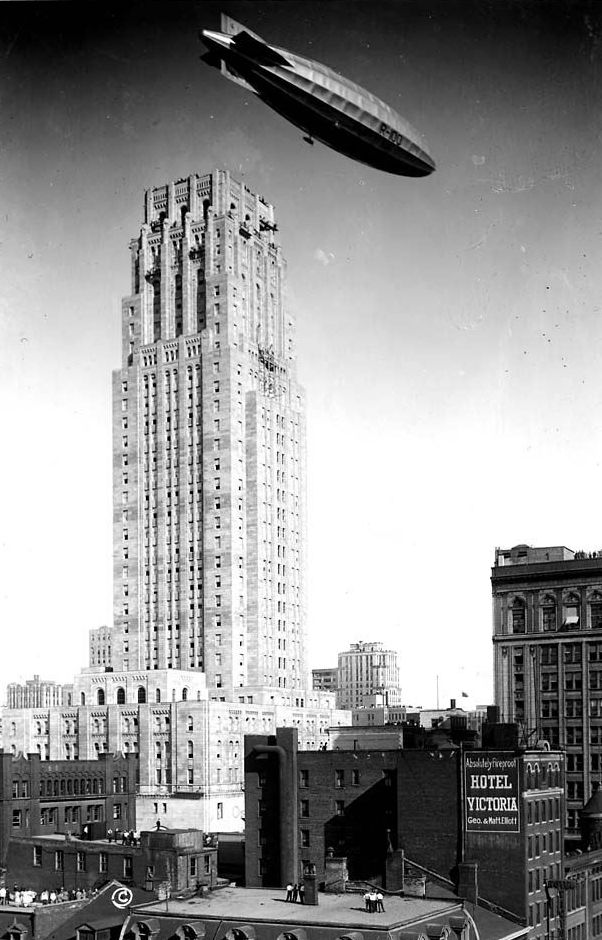
The original Canadian Bank of Commerce building, (still standing), Toronto. For three decades it was the tallest building in the British Commonwealth.

The Fort York Armoury

Hertzberg was also an amateur artist. Many of his drawings are featured in the Canadian War Museum.

== Second World War ==
From 1939 to 1943 Hertzberg was the senior engineering officer for the Canadian Army overseas, forced into relinquishing his command by mandatory age limits. He was the first Canadian to hold the position of Chief Engineer in the Canadian Army.

Hertzberg went overseas in December 1939 as Lieutenant-Colonel of the 1st Canadian Infantry Division, tasked with commanding the engineers. He quickly rose to Chief Engineer of the division, and then of the Army, with the rank of Major General. During his command he and the Canadian engineers developed technologies that proved invaluable to the war effort.

Hertzberg was favored by General Andrew McNaughton and when he reached the age-limit for his rank, McNaughton asked the Minister to grant Hertzberg a special extension because there was "no other suitable officer" who could replace him. Hertzberg was finally forced into retirement in June 1943. McNaughton wrote at the time:

Hertzberg has rendered exceptional service and his work is deserving of the highest commendation. He will be a definite loss to the Canadian Army Overseas but I feel that the policy re retirement age limits must be followed.

Upon retirement Hertzberg was appointed Companion of the Order of the Bath:

On mobilization this officer was appointed C.R.E. 1 Canadian Division and proceeded overseas with his unit in the fall of 1939. He was appointed Chief Engineer 7 Corps on formation, subsequently became Chief Engineer I Canadian Corps and, in April 1942, Chief Engineer First Canadian Army, which post he at present holds. Throughout he has been the Senior Engineer Officer in the United Kingdom and personally responsible for the organization, administration and development of the Royal Canadian Engineers overseas. In the performance of his duties he has displayed initiative, organizing ability and leadership of a high order and the satisfactory state of organization, training and discipline of the Corps of Royal Canadian Engineers overseas is primarily due to this officer's energy, skill and efficiency. His work is deserving of the highest commendation and his zeal and devotion to duty have proved an inspiration and example to those serving under him. ---Awarded as per Canada Gazette and CARO/3494, both dated 2 June 1943.

Hertzberg died in January 1944 of smallpox at the age of 58 while in India. He was on a special assignment developing an innovative form of portable air landing strip. He was buried in the Delhi War Cemetery.

The Canadian Military Engineers award an annual trophy in Hertzberg's name. It is presented annually to the Reserve Engineer unit that successfully completes a stand-alone project of significant training and/or civilian or military community relations value.

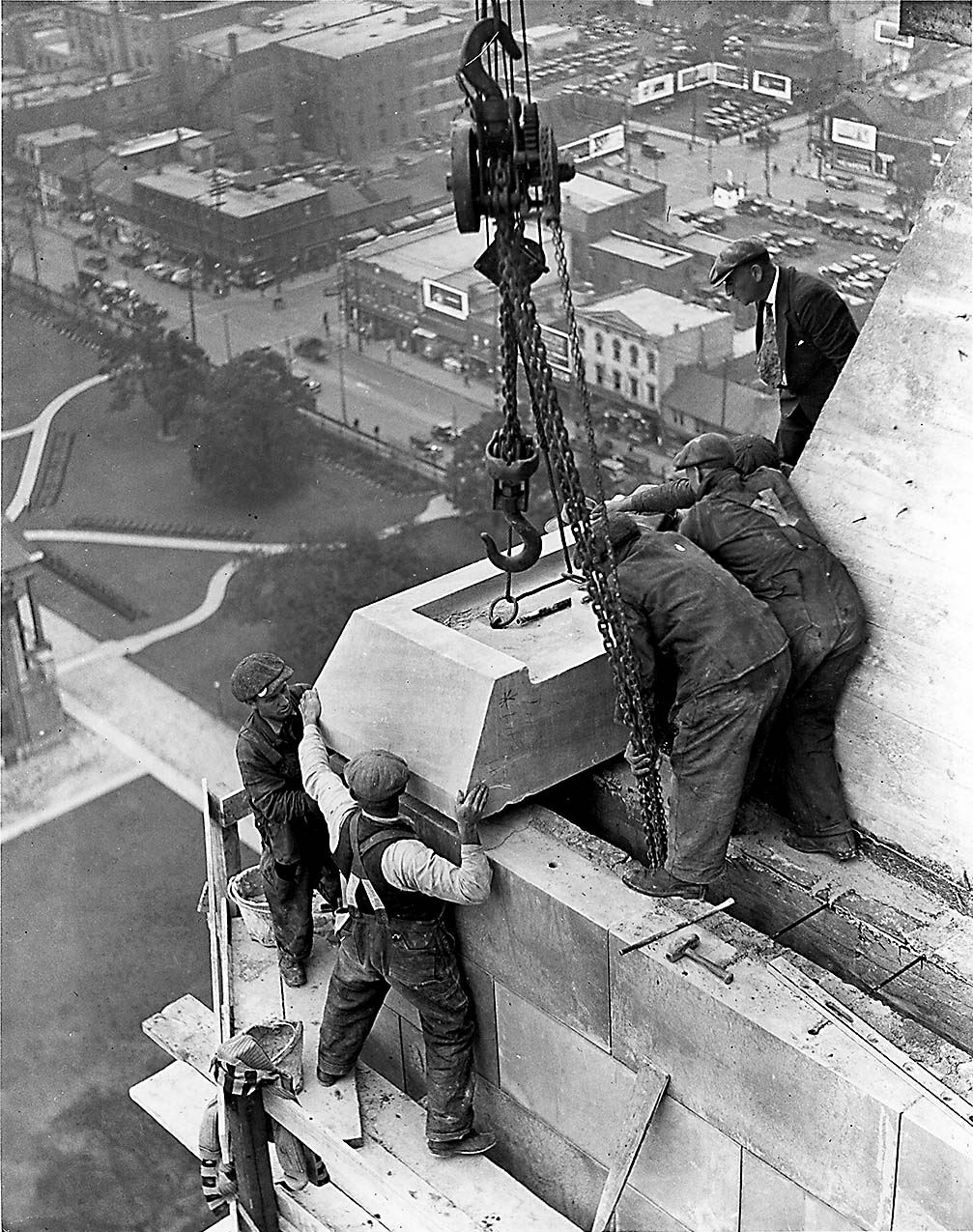
Hertzberg's projects included the Canada Life Building in Toronto, under construction here in 1930.
