= Kirkee War Cemetery =

CWGC cemetery in Maharashtra, India

Coordinates: 18.5519°N 73.8567°E

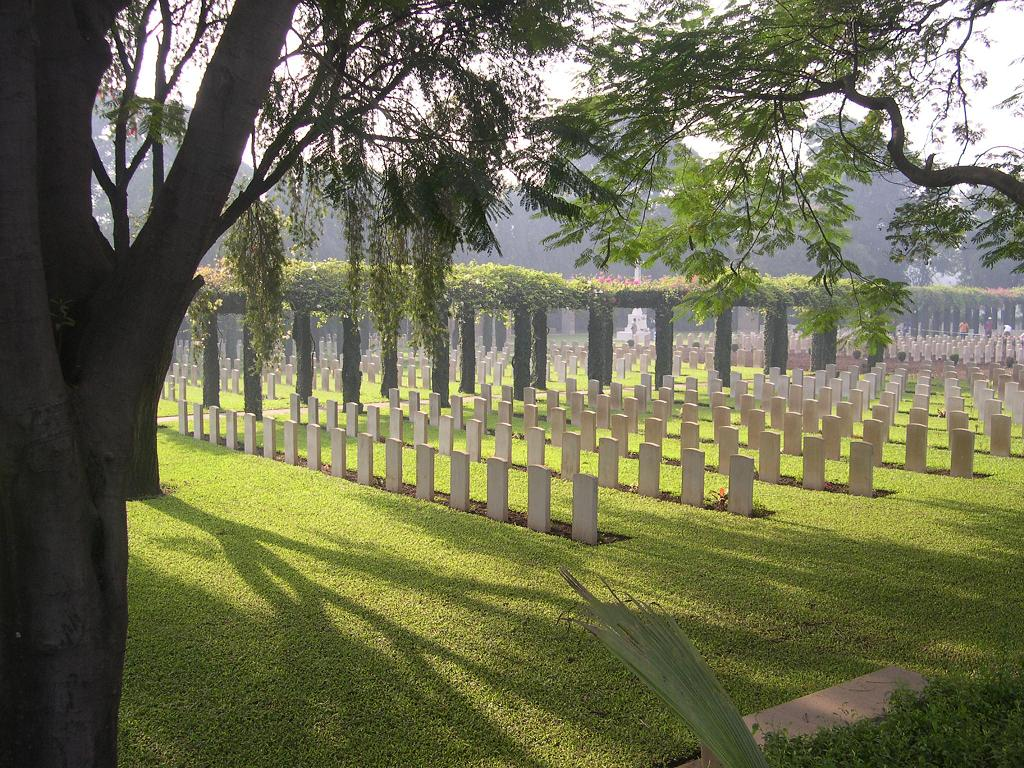
- Kirkee War Cemetery, c. 2005
- Interactive map of Kirkee War Cemetery

Details
- Location: Kirkee, Maharashtra, India
- Type: war cemetery
- No. of graves: 2297
- Find a Grave: Kirkee War Cemetery

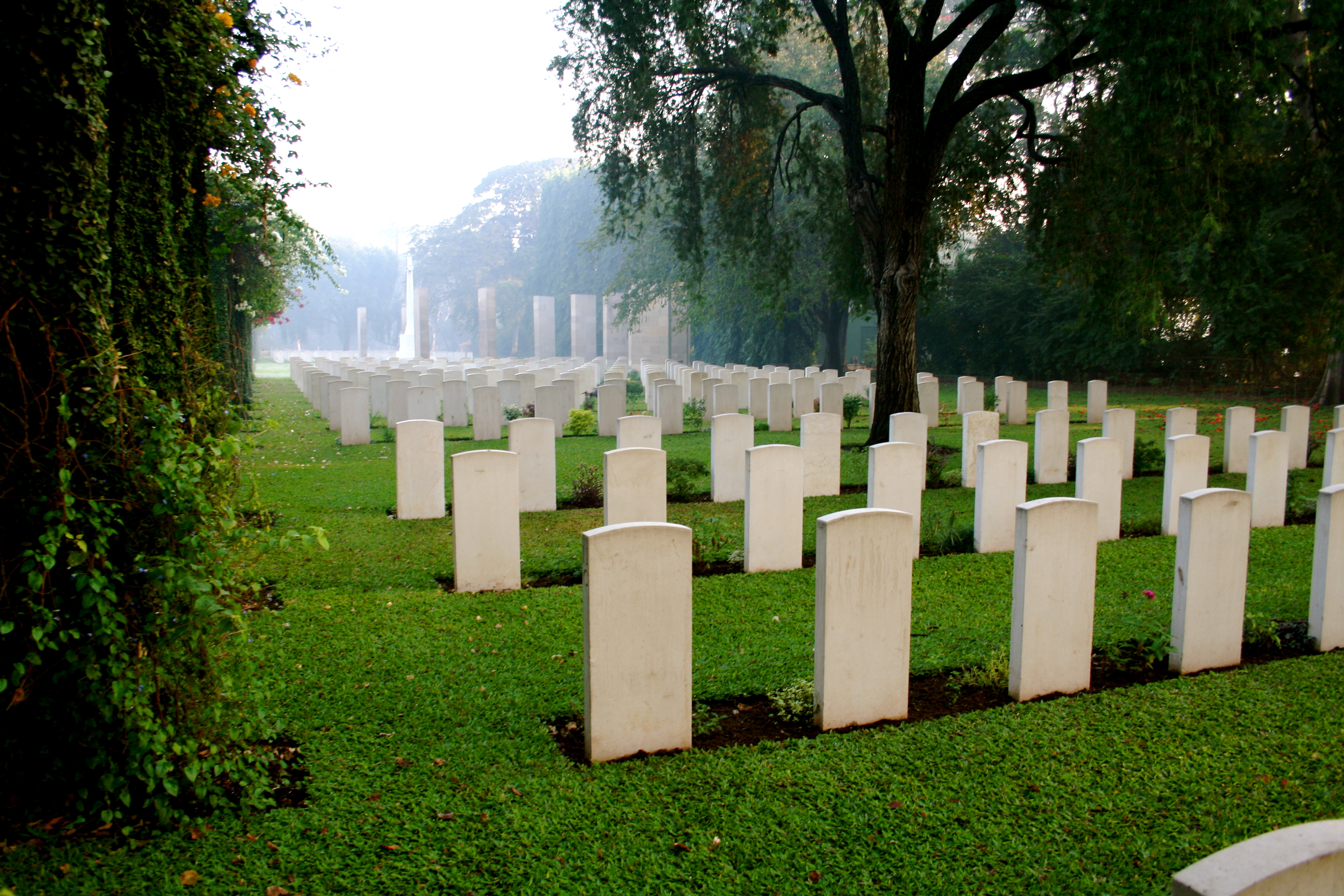
Kirkee War Cemetery

The Kirkee War Cemetery is a cemetery in Khadki (formerly named Kirkee), a cantonment in Pune (formerly Poona) in Maharashtra, India. The cemetery was created to provide graves for the fallen from central and western India in the Second World War, where there could not be certainty about their graves elsewhere being permanently maintained.

The cemetery holds the graves of 1,668 Commonwealth service personnel from World War II, and 629 from World War I who were reburied here from Bombay's Sewri Christian Cemetery in 1962. The graves from Sewri are unmarked and their names are listed on the Kirkee (1914–18) Memorial.

The Kirkee (1914–1918) Memorial is dedicated to 735 Commonwealth service personnel who died in India in World War I and whose graves were in various locations where they could not be maintained, to the 629 whose remains were reburied within the cemetery in 1962 from Sewri Christian Cemetery, and to about 193 soldiers of East and West African origin who died from 1939 to 1945 in various non-operational areas around the country. There is also the Kirkee (1939–1945) Memorial to 197 Commonwealth service personnel (excepting East and West African) who died in World War II and whose graves in other parts of India and in Pakistan are unmaintainable.

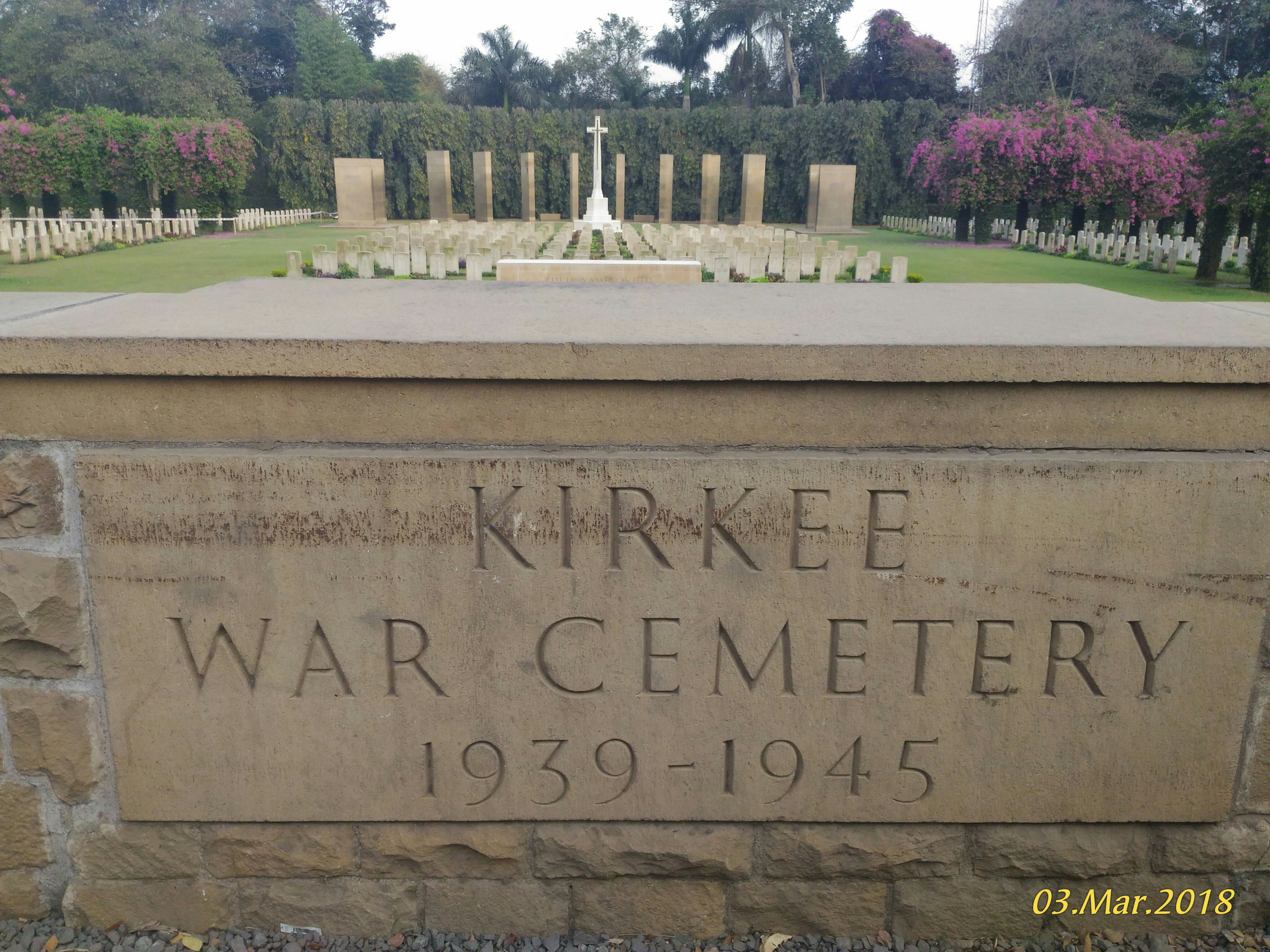

The Cross of Sacrifice stands at the end of the cemetery. There are two special memorials erected by the Commonwealth War Graves Commission.

== See also ==
- Delhi War Cemetery
- Victory Tunnel
