= Victory War Memorial =

Memorial in Chennai, India

- India
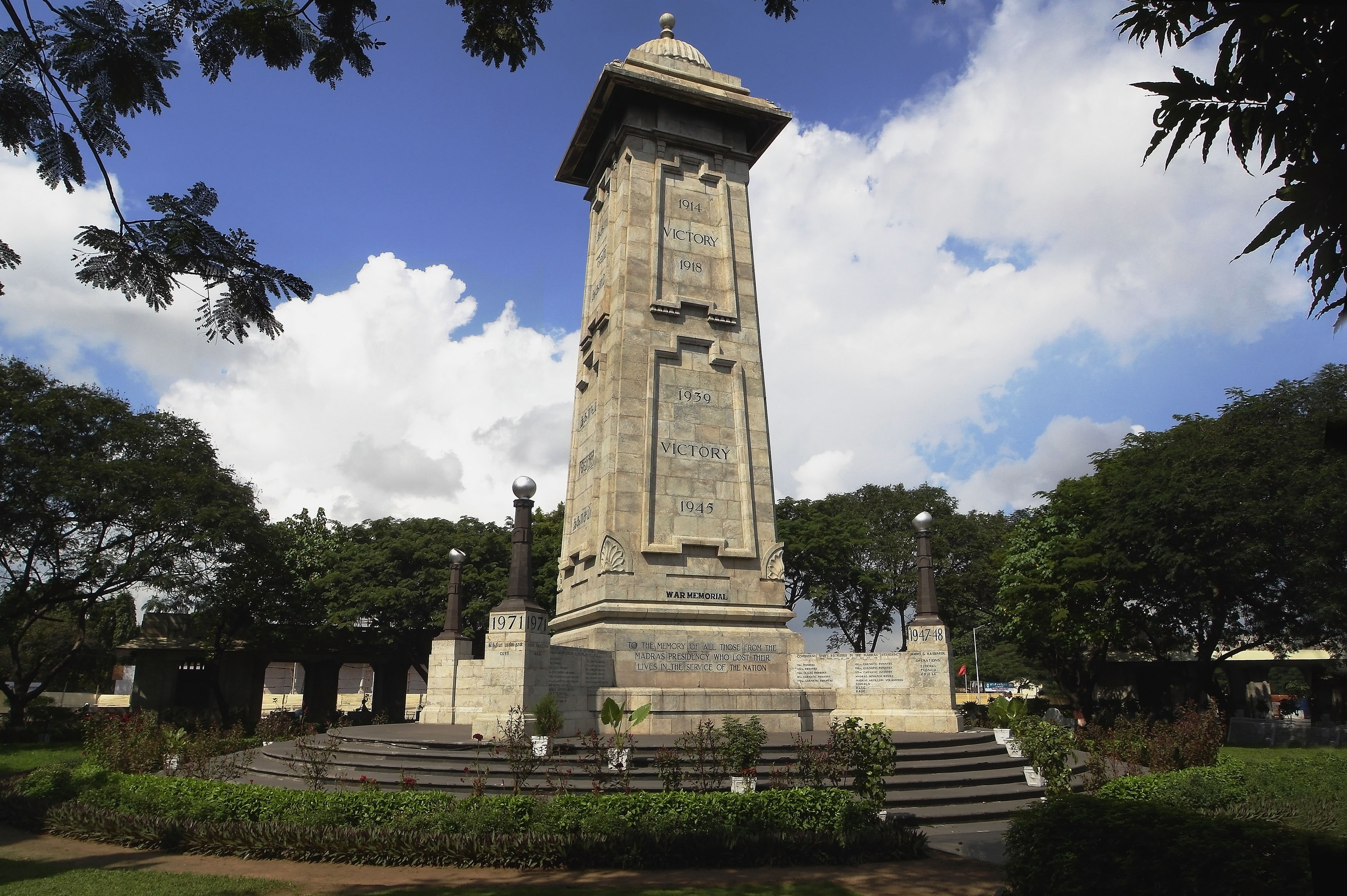
- For those who lost their lives in the service of the nation and post independence martyrs
- Location: 13°4′24″N 80°17′8″E; Chennai
- 1914 Victory 1918 1939 Victory 1945 To the memory of all those from the Madras Presidency who lost their lives in the service of the nation and post independence martyrs

Victory War Memorial, formerly called the Cupid's bow, is an obelisk memorial in Chennai, India, originally constructed to commemorate the victory of the Allied Armies during World War I (1914–1918) and later became the victory war memorial for World War II (1939–1945), erected in the memory of those from the Madras presidency who died in the wars. Later additions include inscriptions for the Indo-Pakistani war of 1947–1948 and the Sino-Indian War.

== Description ==
=== Location ===
The Victory War Memorial is located in a roundabout to the south of Fort St. George and marks the beginning of the Marina beach.

=== Obelisk ===
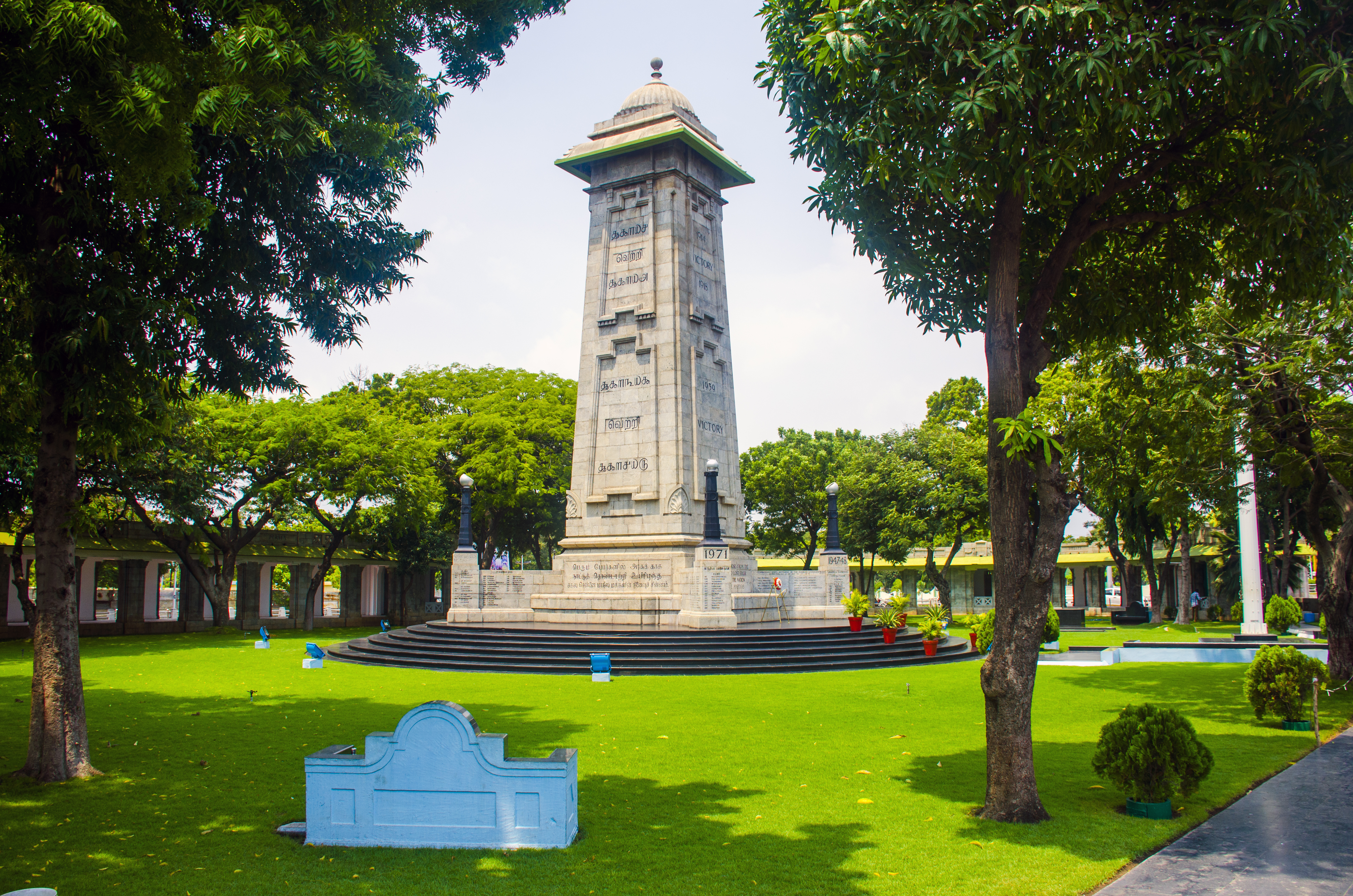
Victory War Memorial

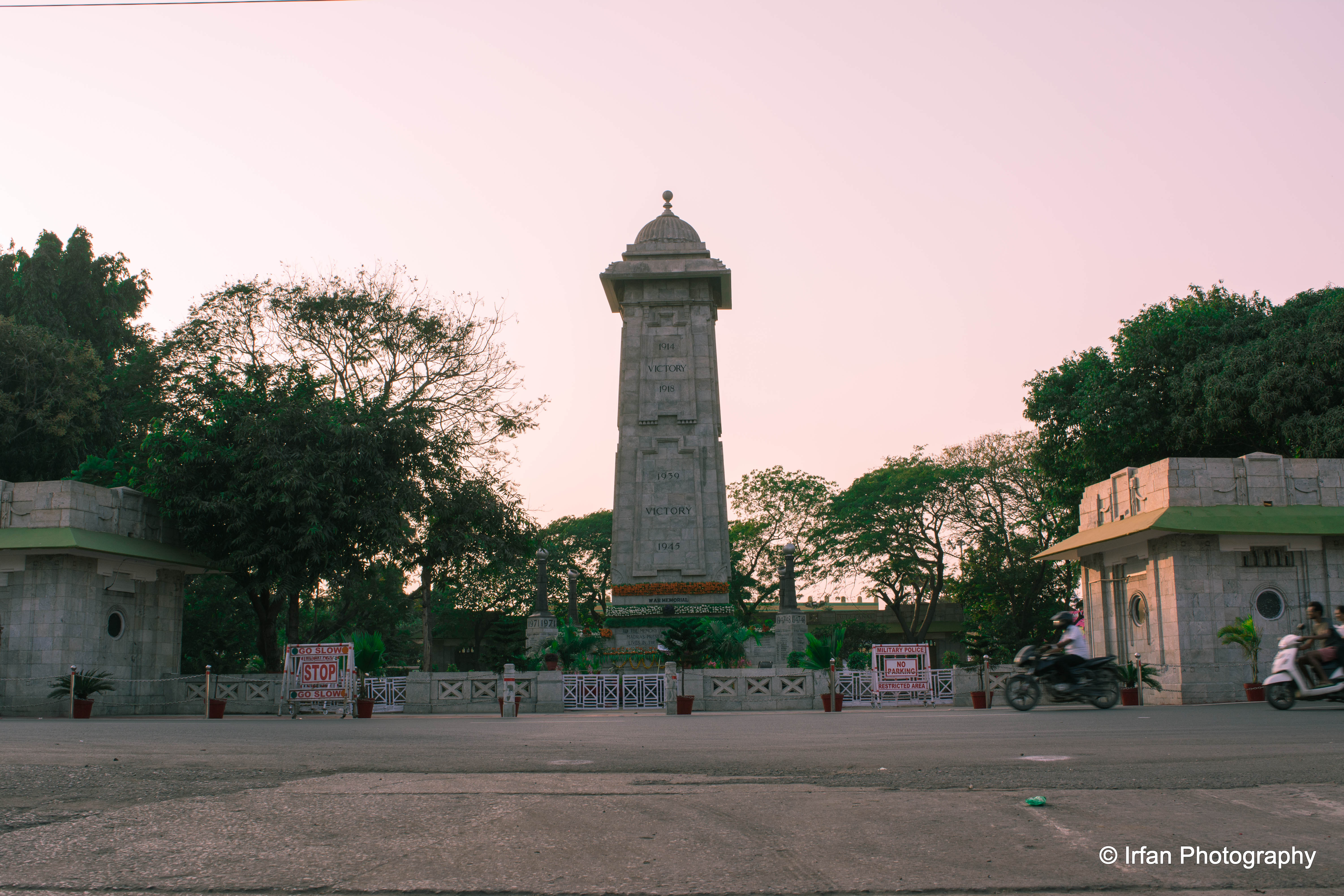
The memorial

The main structure is made of marble and consists of a small circular platform with an obelisk placed at the center. The obelisk has inscriptions in four languages, each side in a different language, Telugu is on the north side, English is on the east side, Hindi is on the west side, and Tamil is on the south side. The main inscriptions are:

- "1914 Victory 1918
- 1939 Victory 1945
- To the memory of all those from the Madras Presidency who lost their lives in the service of the nation and post independence martyrs"

From each corner of the obelisk extends a wall where names of units that fought during the Madras Presidency are inscribed. At the end of each wall is a small pillar, which has names of those who died after Indian independence.

== See also ==
- Madras War Cemetery
- Victory Tunnel
