= Nils Christian Egede Hertzberg =

Norwegian theologian, educator and politician

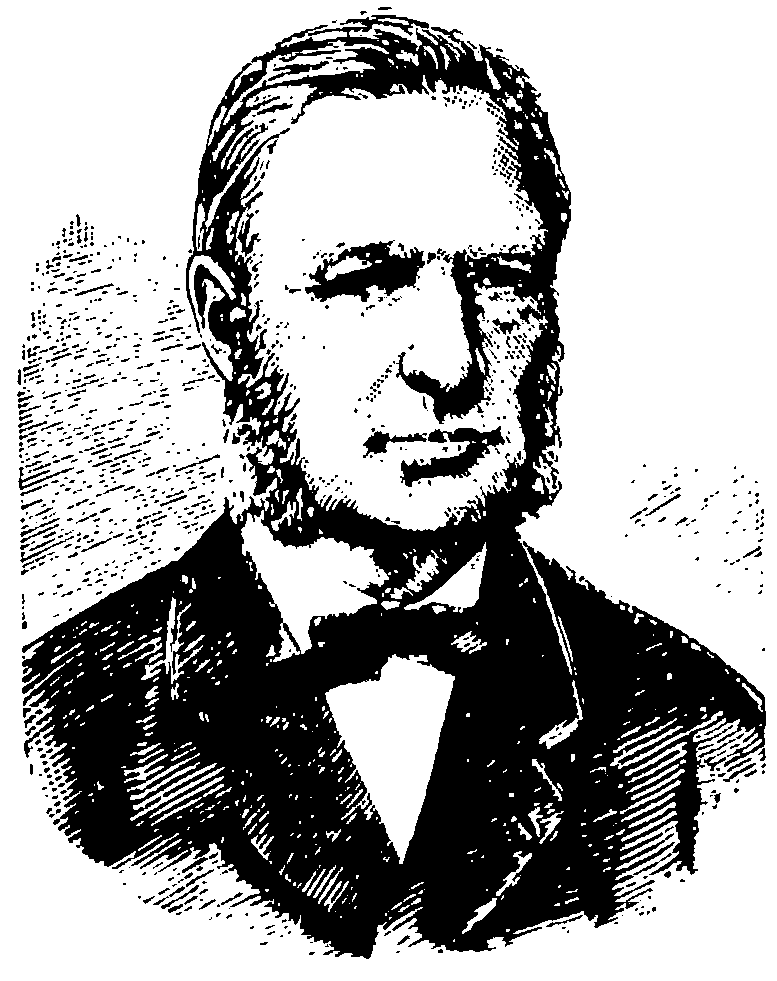

Minister of Education and Church Affairs
- In office 3 April 1884 – 26 June 1884
- Prime Minister: Christian Schweigaard
- Preceded by: Henrik L. Helliesen
- Succeeded by: Elias Blix
- In office 30 January 1882 – 21 March 1884
- Prime Minister: Christian A. Selmer
- Preceded by: Rasmus T. Nissen
- Succeeded by: Henrik L. Helliesen

Personal details
- Born: 26 October 1827 Ullensvang, Hordaland, United Kingdoms of Sweden and Norway
- Died: 8 July 1911 (aged 83) Christiania, Norway
- Party: Conservative
- Spouse: Martha Cathrina Marie Clauson
- Children: Arthur Johan; Nils Hertzberg jr. Johan; Jens

Nils Christian Egede Hertzberg (26 October 1827 – 8 July 1911) was a Norwegian theologian, educator and politician.

== Background ==
He was born in Ullensvang in Hordaland, Norway. He was a son of vicar and politician Niels Hertzberg (1759–1841) and Anna Christine Egede Thomsen (1789–1860). His sister Maja Elisabeth Weinwich Hertzberg (1824–1881) was the wife of author Claus Pavels Riis (1826–86).

The family moved to Bergen when he was nine. He enrolled in Bergen Cathedral School in 1841 and took the examen artium here in 1846. He later graduated from the Royal Frederick University with the cand.theol. degree in 1851.

== Career ==
He was a teacher at the Norwegian Military Academy from 1853, and Asker Seminary from 1860. He was an avid outdoorsman, and took further education in 1865 when he attended the Central Gymnastic School. After that he took over the physical education for the future teachers at Asker Seminary, and organized both gymnastics, shooting and hikes. He also helped start teachers' courses in Centralforeningen for Udbredelse af Legemsøvelser og Vaabenbrug. Physical education was officially included in the teacher seminary curricula in 1867.

In 1867 Hertzberg took over as headmaster of Hamar Teachers' College. In Hamar, he was an opposing force of the Grundtvigianism proposed by Olaus Arvesen and Herman Anker who founded Norway's first folk high school in the city. Hertzberg propagated his views in the periodical Norsk Skoletidende, started by him in 1869 and edited by him until 1873.

In 1873 he was appointed as deputy under-secretary of state in the Ministry of Church Affairs. In 1882 he was chosen as Minister in the same ministry, as a part of the cabinet of Prime Minister Christian August Selmer. On 1 March 1884 he changed to being a member of the Council of State Division in Stockholm. In April 1884 the cabinet was dissolved as it was impeached. He became Minister of Church Affairs and Education in the successor Schweigaard's Cabinet, but in June 1884 it fell because parliamentarism was implemented in Norway for the first time. In the 1885 Norwegian parliamentary election he was elected to the Parliament of Norway from the constituency Kristiania, Hønefoss og Kongsvinger. He was re-elected in 1888, and served two terms.

== Personal life ==
In December 1864 he married Martha Catharina Marie Clauson (1844–1928). They had the sons: author Nils Christian Egede Hertzberg (1866-1941), missionary priest Arthur Johan Hertzberg (1870-1940), rector Johan Hertzberg (1872-1954) clergyman Mikael Skjelderup Hertzberg (1874-1927) and colonel Jens Skjelderup Hertzberg (1877-1940).

Hertzberg wrote several books, mostly after retiring as a government minister. His memoirs were published in two volumes in 1909 and 1910; Fra min Barndoms og Ungdoms Tid 1827–1856 and Minder fra min Skolemestertid 1844–1873.

Hertzberg was a fellow of the Royal Norwegian Society of Sciences and Letters from 1883, and an honorary member of Centralforeningen and Animal Protection Norway. He was decorated as a Knight, First Class of the Order of St. Olav in 1877 and promoted to Commander in 1893. He died in July 1911 in Kristiania.
