= Delhi War Cemetery =

CWGC cemetery in New Delhi, India

- Commonwealth War Graves Commission; Government of India
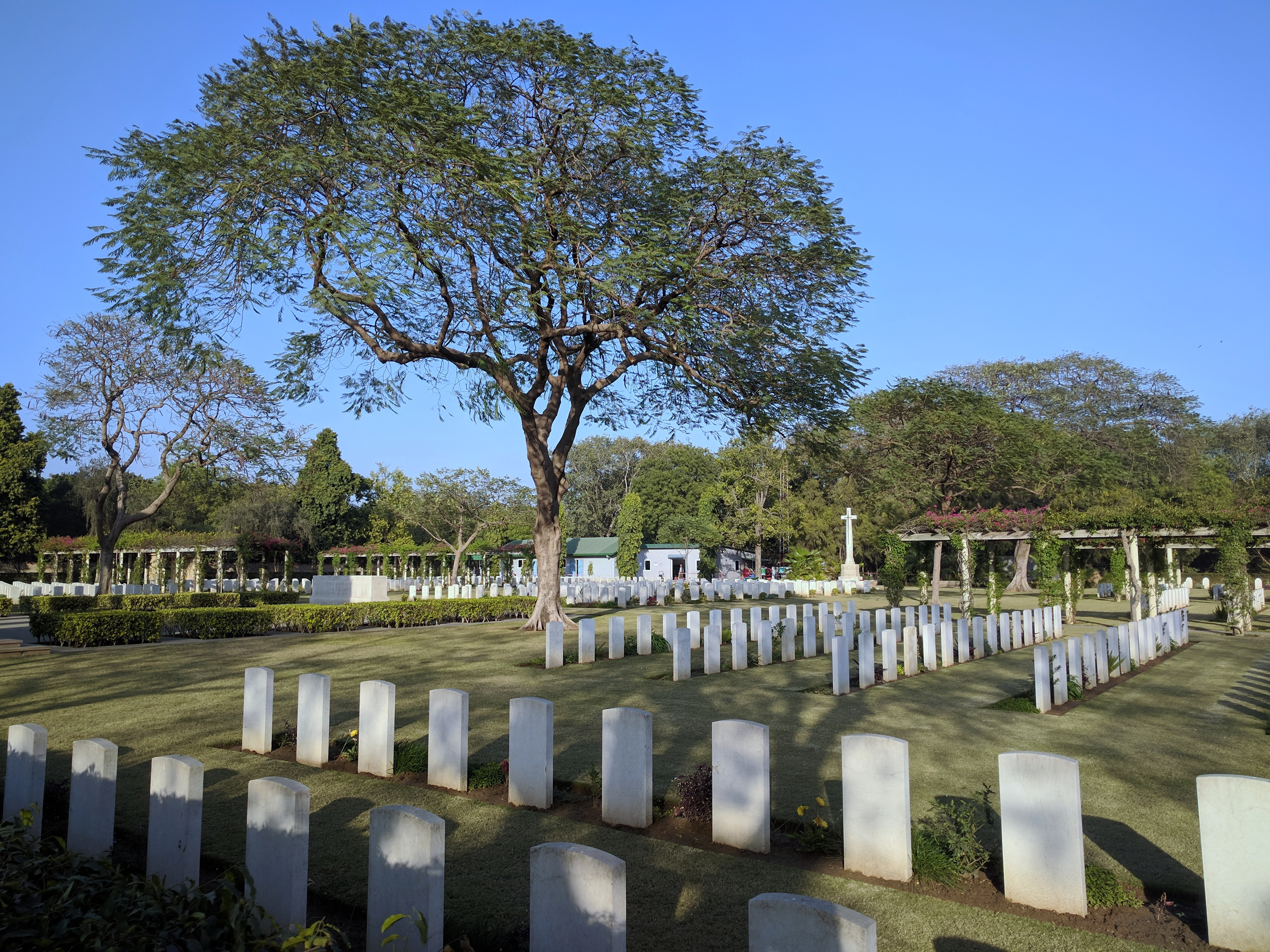
- For service personnel who fought for the British Empire during the First and Second World Wars
- Established: 1951; 75 years ago
- Location: 28.61624°N 77.14542°E near New Delhi, India
- Designed by: H. J. Brown (associate member of the Royal Institute of British Architects)
- Total burials: 1154

Burials by nation
- United Kingdom: 941; Indian: 152; Dutch: 30; Canadian: 15; Australian: 10; New Zealand: 5 Polish: 1

Burials by war
- World War I: 101; World War II: 1053

The Delhi War Cemetery, in the Delhi Cantonment, Delhi, India, is the site of the graves of 1,154 service personnel who served the British Empire during the First and Second World Wars. The cemetery was established in 1951 to ensure the permanent preservation of the remains of soldiers across various cemeteries in northern India.

At the entrance to the cemetery is the Delhi 1939–1945 War Memorial honouring the efforts of Indian forces during both world wars. The Delhi 1914–18 Memorial, commemorating 153 individuals buried in the Meerut Cantonment, where graves could no longer be cared for, is also on the site. The cemetery was commissioned by the Commonwealth War Graves Commission and is now jointly maintained with the Government of India and its Ministry of Defence.

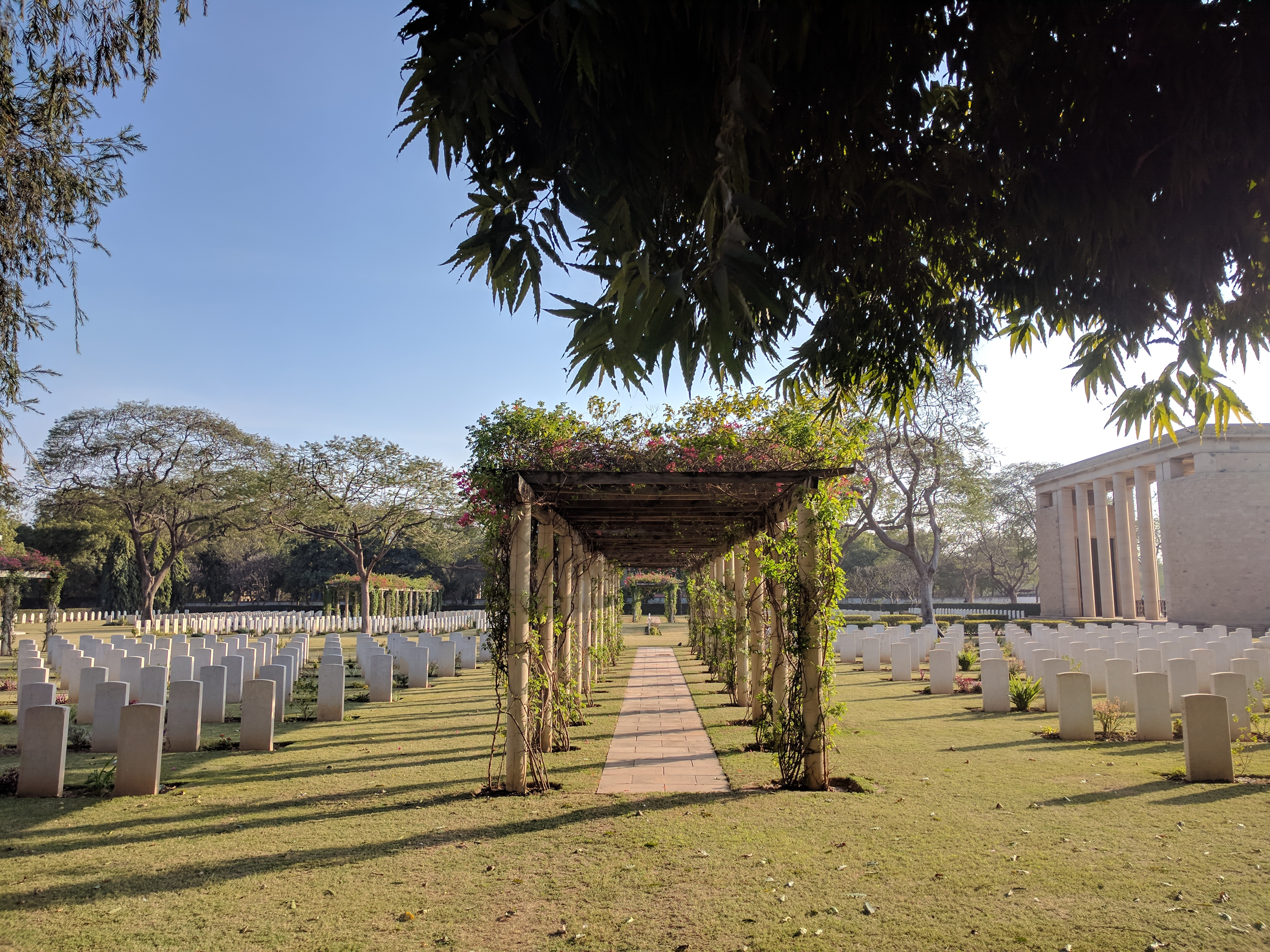
Visible on the right side of the image is the Delhi 1939–1945 War Memorial.

== Cemetery ==
The Commonwealth War Graves Commission records 1,154 burials in the Delhi War Cemetery. The graves contain the remains of citizens of the United Kingdom, India, Netherlands, Canada, Australia, New Zealand and Poland from World War I and World War II. 821 graves contain individuals from the army and 296 from the air force. The rest contain personnel from the navy and merchant navy as well as a nurse and a civilian. Some of the war graves belong to those from regiments such as: the King's Own Yorkshire Light Infantry, the 3rd Queen Alexandra's Own Gurkha Rifles, the Royal Northumberland Fusiliers, the Royal Engineers, the Gloucestershire Regiment, the Royal Artillery and the Burma Rifles.

There are also special memorials for thirty-two service personnel whose remains could not be traced, including Maureen Grundy, a leading aircraftwoman in the Women's Auxiliary Air Force. Her Grave Registration Report by the Commonwealth War Graves Commission shows that while her ashes were deposited at St Martin's Church, Delhi, they could not be found later by Church authorities. Accordingly a special memorial in the form of a gravestone with her full service particulars was erected in commemoration. The youngest burials are four service personnel aged eighteen, while the oldest burial is Major Reginald Hamilton Richmond of the 5th Royal Gurkha Rifles (Frontier Force).

Three major generals are also buried at the memorial, Charles Sumner Lund Hertzberg of the Canadian Army, George Grant Tabuteau of the Royal Army Medical Corps and Thomas George Gordon Heywood. Hertzberg was commander of the Royal Canadian Engineering Corps as chief engineer and died at age fifty-seven after contracting smallpox on a special assignment in India, Tabuteau died while commandeering the position of the director of medical services at General Headquarters India, and Heywood died when the Royal Air Force transport plane he was in crashed at Allahabad in 1943.

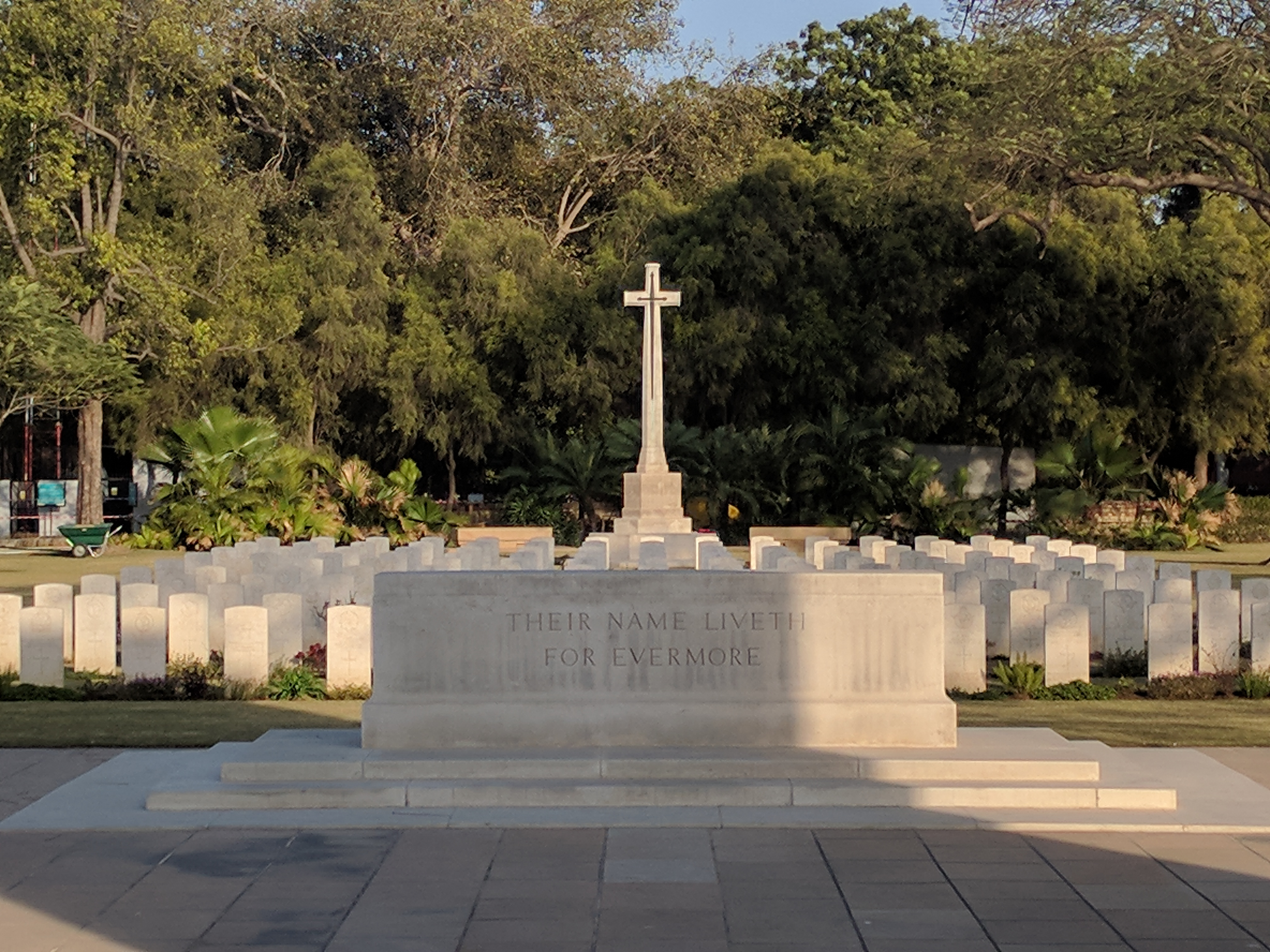
The Stone of Remembrance visible in the foreground as well as the Cross of Sacrifice in the background.

A Stone of Remembrance, engraved with the words 'their name liveth for evermore' is also present at the cemetery, as well as a Cross of Sacrifice. The Stone of Remembrance, designed by British architect Edwin Lutyens, and the Cross of Sacrifice, designed by Reginald Blomfield, are two standard architectural features of Commonwealth War Graves Commission cemeteries and memorials. The cemetery covers approximately 10,000 square metres (12,000 square yards) and was designed by H. J. Brown, an associate member of the Royal Institute of British Architects.

On the second Saturday of November, Remembrance Day, the British High Commission and others visit the memorial and place wreaths in memory of the dead. On 11 November 2018, Tom Tugendhat, a British member of parliament, paid his respects at the Delhi War Cemetery where he laid wreaths of poppies made from red Khadi which The Royal British Legion chose in 2018 to acknowledge India's role in the war.

== Delhi 1939–1945 War Memorial ==
The Delhi 1939–1945 War Memorial forms the front entrance to the Delhi War Cemetery. It is identical to the memorial at the Karachi War Cemetery. There are no names engraved on the memorial, but a Roll of Honour in Hindi and Urdu can be found at the site which has names of the 25,000 service personnel of the forces of undivided India who died during World War II. Since the last rites and disposal or keep of remains varies by religion and country, the memorial is a commemoration for those who are not buried.

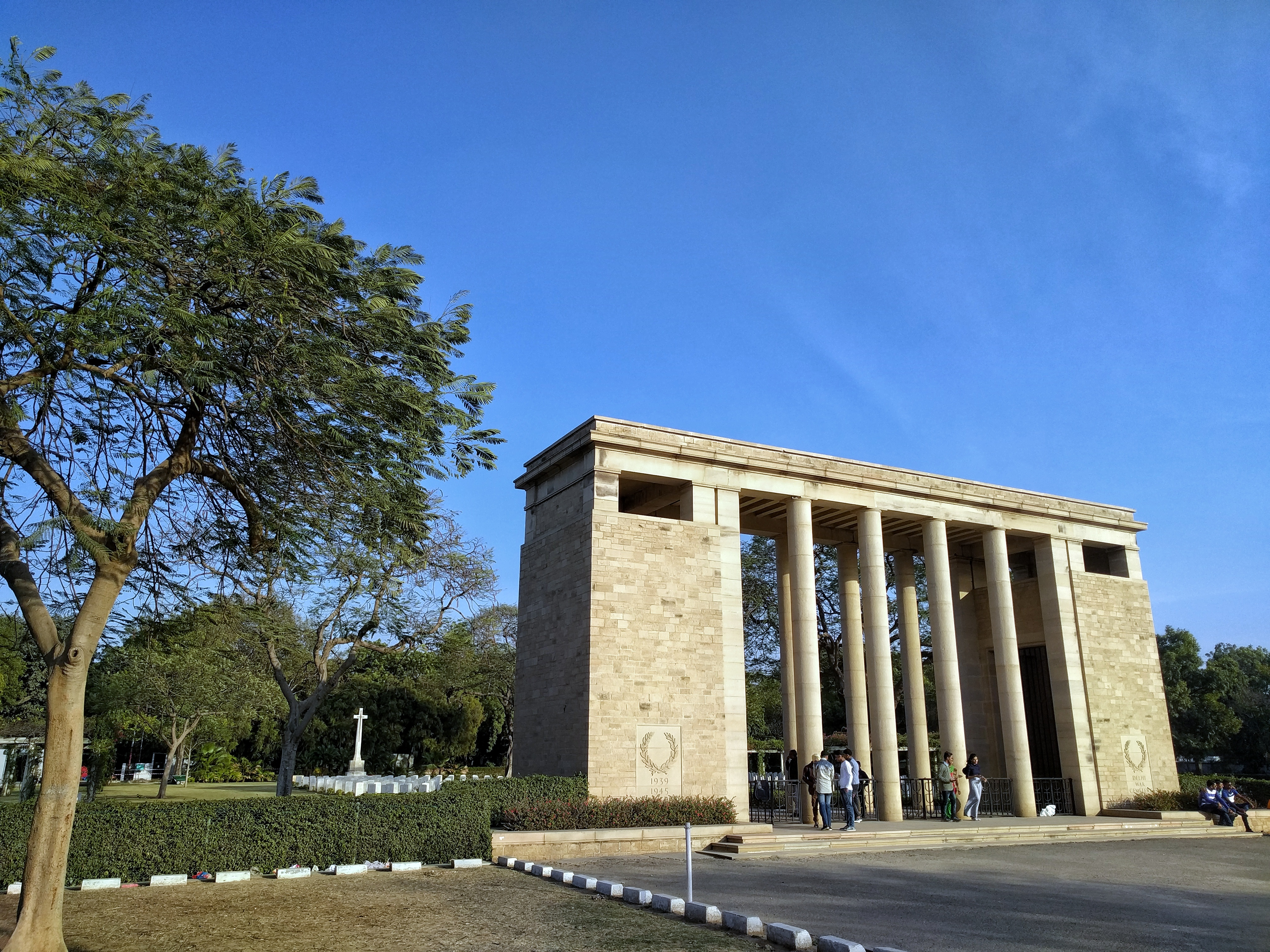
Delhi 1939–1945 War Memorial. The Cemetery is visible in the background.

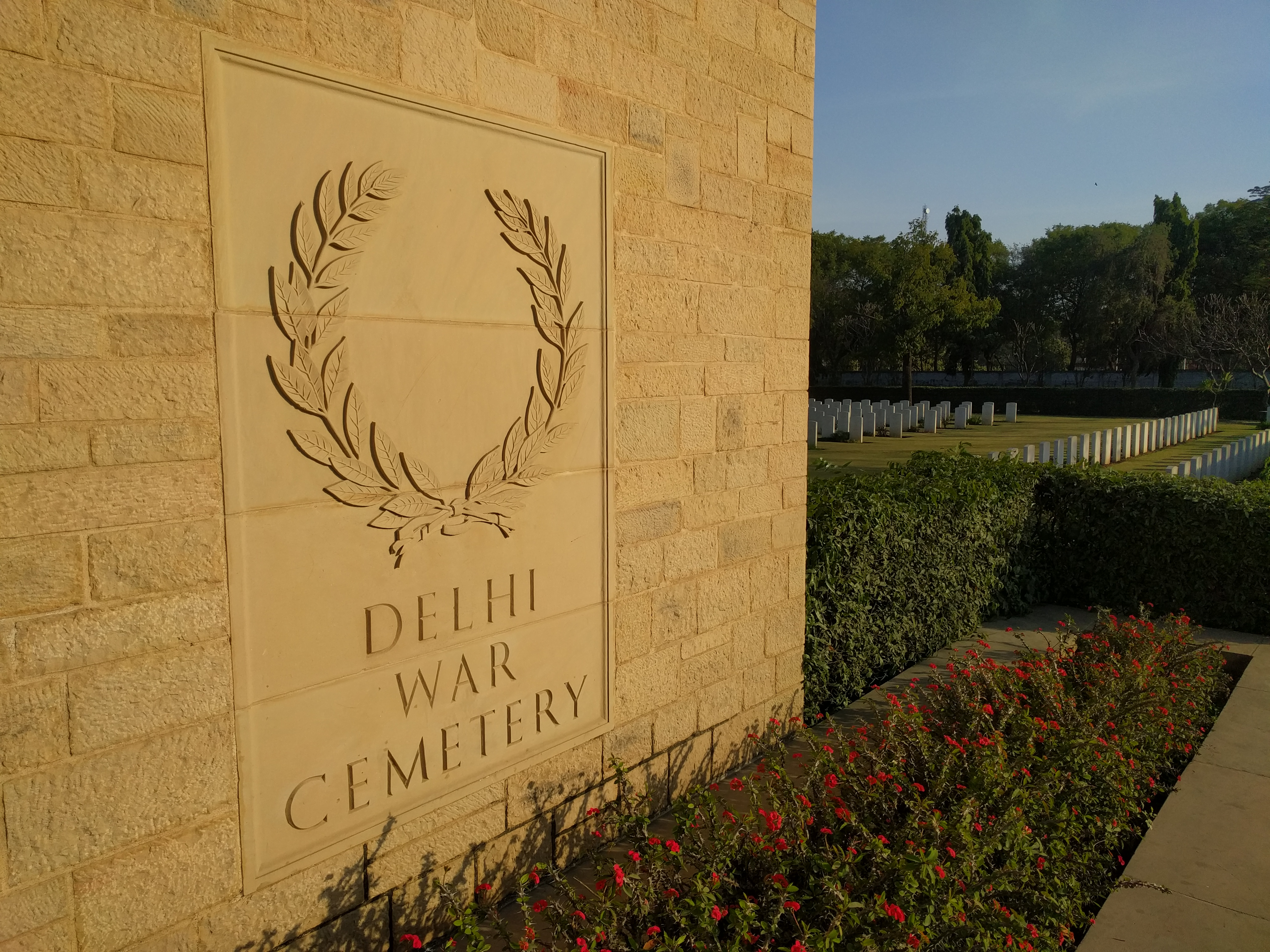
A closeup of one of the engravings on the Delhi 1939–1945 War Memorial.

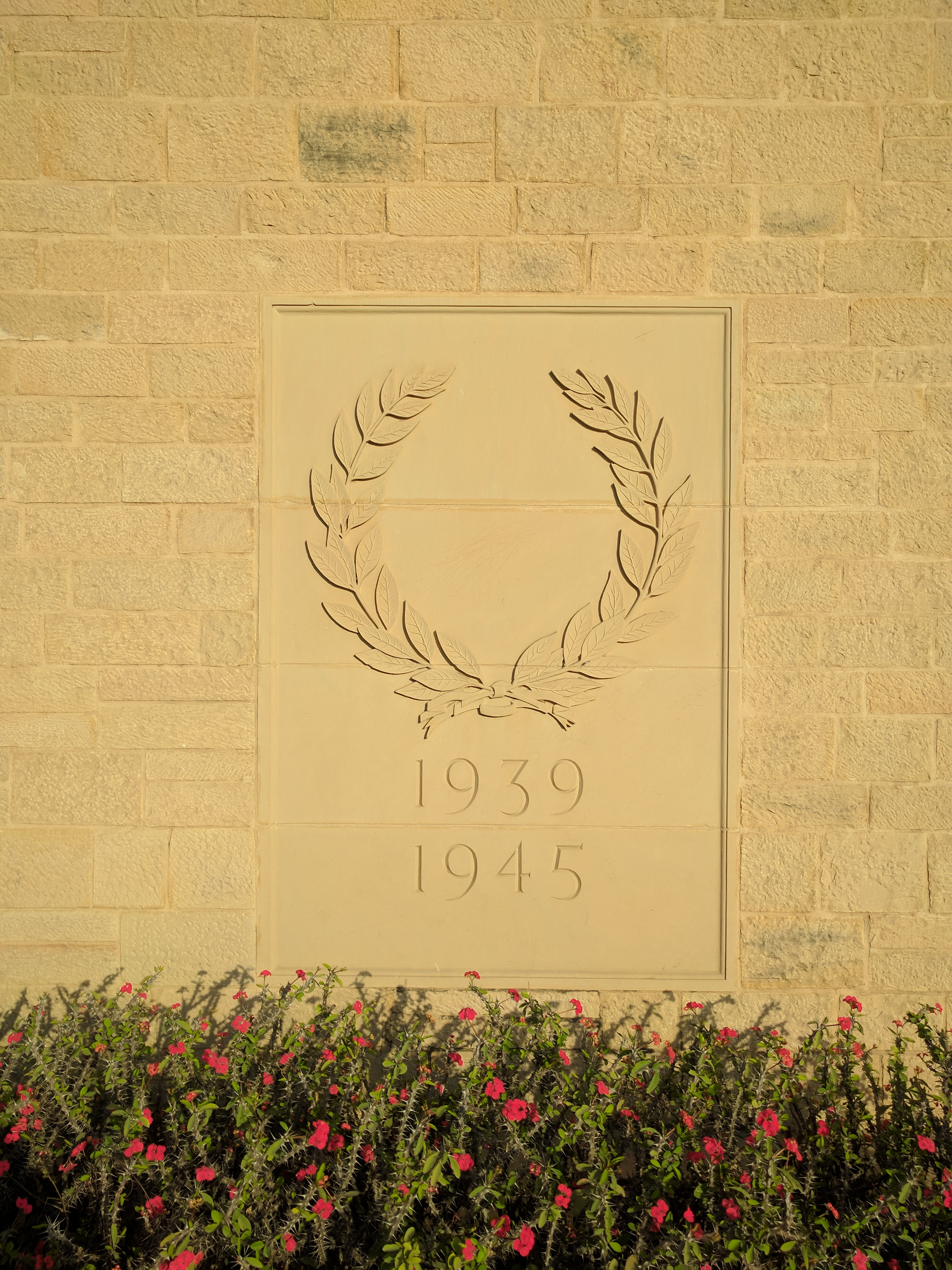
A closeup of another one of the engravings on the Memorial.

== See also ==
- Madras War Cemetery, India
- Kirkee War Cemetery, Pune, India
- Kohima War Cemetery, Nagaland, India
- Nicholson Cemetery, New Delhi
- Lothian Cemetery, India
- Victory Tunnel, Shimla

== Bibliography ==
- Gilbert, Martin (2014). The Routledge Atlas of the Second World War. Routledge, Taylor and Francis Group. ISBN 9780415397094
- T. A. Edwin Gibson, G. Kingsley Ward (1989). Courage remembered: the story behind the construction and maintenance of the Commonwealth's military cemeteries and memorials of the wars of 1914–1918 and 1939–1945. Her Majesty's Stationery Office (HMSO). ISBN 9780117726086
- Great Britain, Imperial War Graves Commission. (1957) The war dead of the British Commonwealth and Empire, 1939–1945 : the Delhi and Karachi 1939–1945 war memorials. Imperial War Graves Commission.
