= Halfdan Hertzberg =

Canadian general (1884–1959)

H.F.H. Hertzberg
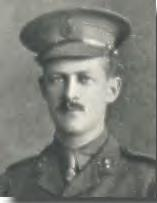
- Major General H.F.H. Hertzberg.
- Born: Halfdan Fenton Harboe Hertzberg; 3 September 1884; Toronto, Ontario, Canada
- Died: 21 December 1959 (aged 75)
- Relatives: Charles Hertzberg (brother)
- Military career
- Allegiance: Canada
- Branch: Canadian Army
- Service years: 1903–1944
- Rank: Major General
- Nicknames: "Hertz" "H. F. H."
- Unit: Royal Canadian Engineers
- Commands: Royal Military College of Canada
- Conflicts: First World War; Second World War
- Awards: Companion of the Order of the Bath; Companion of the Order of St Michael and St George; Distinguished Service Order; Military Cross; Mentioned in Despatches (4)

Major General Halfdan Fenton Harboe Hertzberg CB, CMG, DSO, MC, ADC (3 September 1884 – 21 December 1959) was a Canadian general and Commandant of the Royal Military College of Canada during the Second World War. He also served as Quartermaster General and Adjutant-General for the Canadian Army, narrowly missing the position of Chief of General Staff (CGS).

== Military career ==
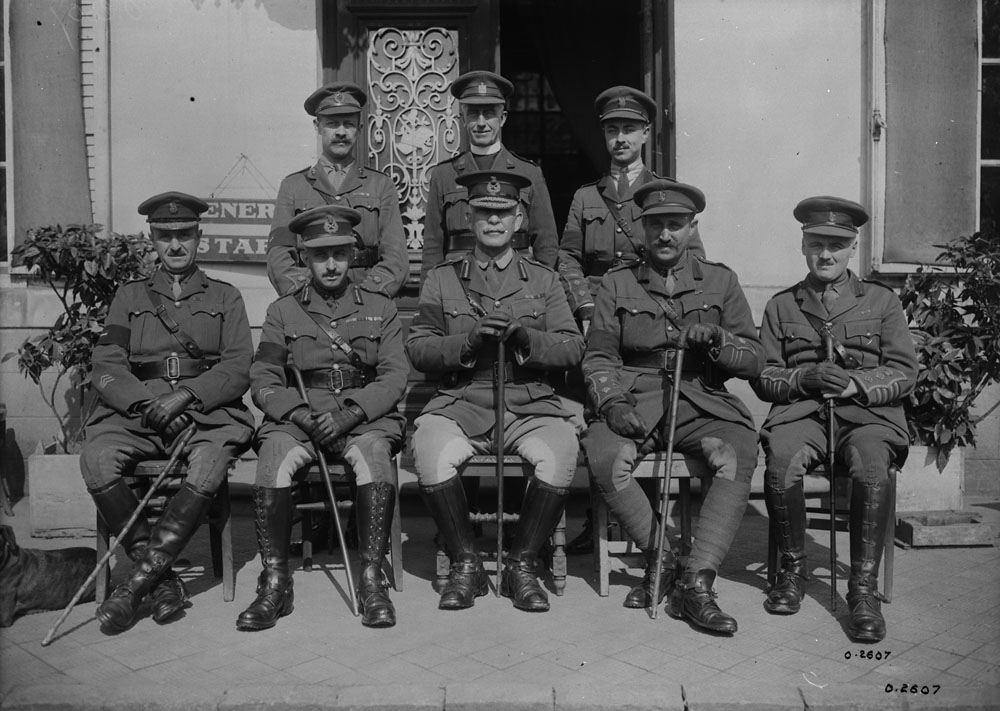
Major-General A. C. MacDonell and staff officers, 1st Canadian Division, sometime in 1918. (Front row, from left to right): Lieutenant-Colonel J. L. R. Parsons, Brigadier-General H. C. Thacker, Major-General A. C. Macdonnell, Lieutenant-Colonel J. Sutherland Brown, Colonel H. P. Wright. (Back row, from left to right): Lieutenant-Colonel H. F. H. Hertzberg, Hon. Lieutenant-Colonel F. G. Scott, Lieutenant J. M. Macdonnell.

Hertzberg was a descendant of a well-known military family from Norway. He was educated at Upper Canada College and St. Andrew's College, before getting an engineering degree at University of Toronto.

He served with the Canadian Expeditionary Force (CEF) on the Western Front during World War I, earning himself both the Military Cross (MC) and the Distinguished Service Order (DSO), as well as the rank of colonel.

After the war, he was appointed a Companion of the Order of St Michael and St George. He remained in the army, and attended the British Army's Staff College.

== Family ==
Hertzberg's brother, Charles Hertzberg, was also a major general. They were the only two brothers to reach general officer rank at the same time in the Canadian Army.

Military offices
Preceded by Kenneth Stuart	Commandant of the Royal Military College of Canada; 1940–1944	Succeeded by Douglas Gordon Cunningham
