= 1773 in Denmark =

- Decades: 1750s; 1760s; 1770s; 1780s; 1790s
- See also: Other events of 1773; List of years in Denmark

Events from the year 1773 in Denmark.

== Incumbents ==
- Monarch – Christian VII
- Prime minister – Ove Høegh-Guldberg

== Events ==
- 1 June – The Treaty of Tsarskoye Selo is signed by Denmark and Russia.

== Births ==
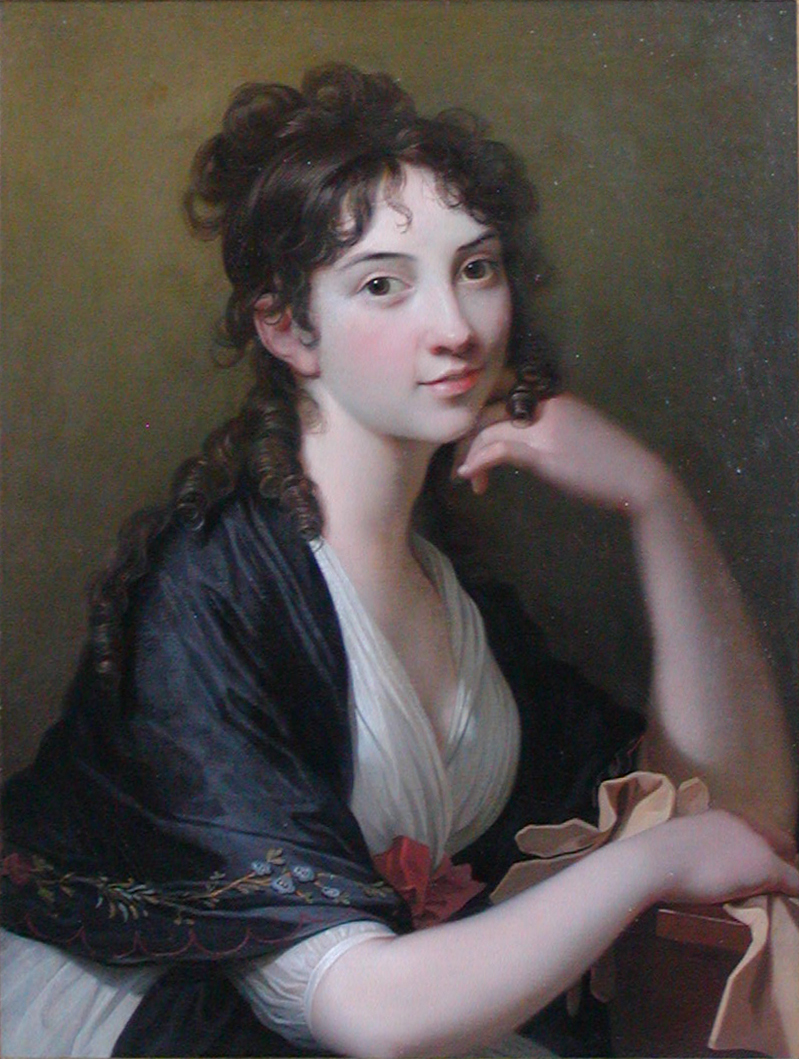
Thomasine Gyllembourg-

  - 14 May – Hans Bøchmann Melchior, naturalist (died 1831)
- 9 January – Carl Emil Moltke, diplomat and landowner (died 1858)
- 9 November – Thomasine Christine Gyllembourg-Ehrensvärd, author (d. 1856)

== Deaths ==
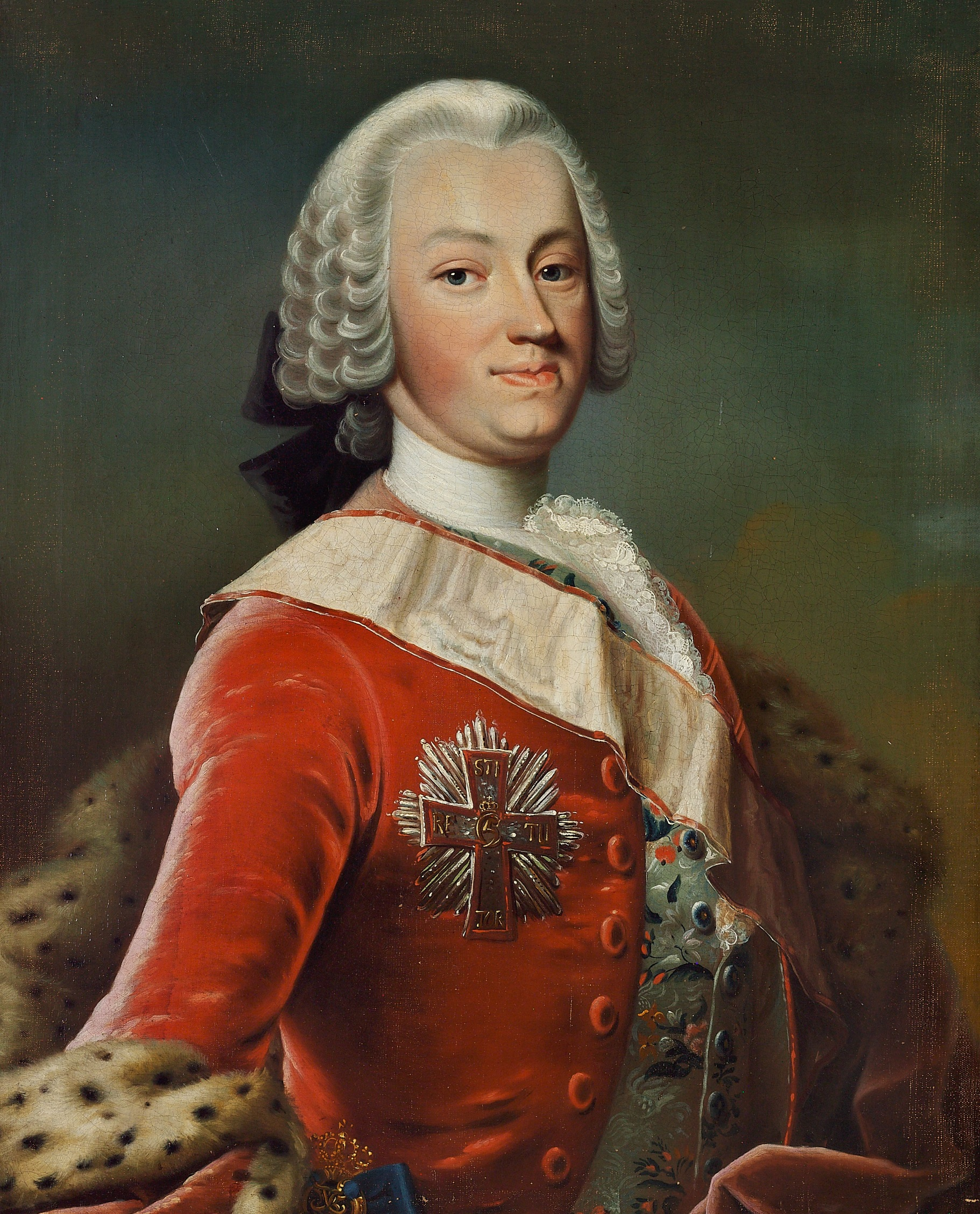
Frederik Christian von Møsting-

- 17 February – Frederik Christian von Møsting, government official (born 1717)
- 26 February – Christian Frederik Raben, county governor and landowner (born 1693)
- 20 April – Jens Nielsen Kragh, colonial administrator and plantation owner (born c. 1729)
- 21 April – Jens Høysgaard, philologist (born 1698)

Full date missing

- Catarina Gustmeyer, businessperson
