= List of county governors of Aust-Agder =

The county governor of Aust-Agder county in Norway represented the central government administration in the county. The office of county governor is a government agency of the Kingdom of Norway; the title was Amtmann (before 1919) and then Fylkesmann (after 1919). On 1 January 2016, the office was merged with the county governor of Vest-Agder into the county governor of Aust- og Vest-Agder in preparation for the merger of the two counties on 1 January 2020.

The diocesan county called Stavanger stiftamt was established in 1669 by the king, and it had several subordinate counties (amt) including Agdesiden amt. In 1671, Agdesiden amt was divided into Lister og Mandals amt (later called Vest-Agder) and Nedenæs amt (later called Aust-Agder). In 1682, the Stavanger stiftamt headquarters was moved to the town of Christianssand and renamed Christianssand stiftamt. The seat of Nedenæs amt was in the town of Arendal. In 1919, the county was renamed Aust-Agder. In 2020, Aust-Agder and Vest-Agder counties were merged into Agder county.

The county governor is the government's representative in the county. The governor carries out the resolutions and guidelines of the Storting and government. This is done first by the county governor performing administrative tasks on behalf of the ministries. Secondly, the county governor also monitors the activities of the municipalities and is the appeal body for many types of municipal decisions.

== Names ==
The word for county (amt or fylke) has changed over time as has the name of the county. From 1671 until 1918, the title was Amtmann i Nedenæs amt. From 1919 until 2016, the title was Fylkesmann i Aust-Agder fylke.

== List of county governors ==
Aust-Agder county has had the following governors:

County governors of Nedenæs amt
| Start | End | Name |
|---|---|---|
| 1671 | 1679 | Ove Juul (1615–1688); Served concurrently as Stiftamtmann for Christianssand stiftamt. |
| 1680 | 1681 | Jens Toller Rosenheim (1636–1690) |
| 1681 | 1691 | Jørgen Müller (1648–1695) |
| 1691 | 1694 | Christian Stockfleth (1639–1704); Served concurrently as Amtmann for Lister og Mandals amt (1691–1692). Served concurrently as Stiftamtmann for Christianssand stiftamt (1691–1692). |
| 1691 | 1692 | Claus Røyem (1638–1692) (Acting for Stockfleth while he served as envoy to Sweden.); Served concurrently as Amtmann for Lister og Mandals amt (1691–1692). Served concurrently as Stiftamtmann for Christianssand stiftamt (1691–1692). |
| 1694 | 1700 | Mats de Tonsberg (1640–1705); Served concurrently as Stiftamtmann for Christianssand stiftamt. |
| 1700 | 1711 | Christian Frederik Powisch (c. 1650–1711); Served concurrently as Stiftamtmann for Christianssand stiftamt. |
| 1711 | 1718 | Henrik Adeler (1660–1718); Served concurrently as Stiftamtmann for Christianssand stiftamt. |
| 1718 | 1728 | Johan Sigismund Hassius Lillienpalm (1664–1729); Served concurrently as Stiftamtmann for Christianssand stiftamt. |
| 1728 | 1730 | Alexander Frederik Møsting (1680–1737); Served concurrently as Stiftamtmann for Christianssand stiftamt. |
| 1730 | 1738 | Johan Albrecht With (1683–1754); Served concurrently as Stiftamtmann for Christianssand stiftamt. |
| 1738 | 1742 | Carl Juel (1706–1767); Served concurrently as Stiftamtmann for Christianssand stiftamt. |
| 1742 | 1746 | Heinrich von Reuss (1707–1783); Served concurrently as Stiftamtmann for Christianssand stiftamt. |
| 1746 | 1751 | Joachim Hartvig Johan von Barner (1699–1768); Served concurrently as Stiftamtmann for Christianssand stiftamt. |
| 1751 | 1766 | Frederik Adeler (1700–1766); Served concurrently as Stiftamtmann for Christianssand stiftamt. |
| 1767 | 1767 | Gustav Frederik Holck-Winterfeldt (1733–1776); Served concurrently as Stiftamtmann for Christianssand stiftamt. |
| 1767 | 1781 | Hans Hagerup Gyldenpalm (1717–1781); Served concurrently as Stiftamtmann for Christianssand stiftamt. |
| 1781 | 1788 | Frederik Georg Adeler (1736–1810); Served concurrently as Stiftamtmann for Christianssand stiftamt. |
| 1788 | 1789 | Frederik Moltke (1754–1836); Served concurrently as Stiftamtmann for Christianssand stiftamt. |
| 1789 | 1800 | Hans Christoph Diderik Victor von Levetzow (1754–1829); Served concurrently as Stiftamtmann for Christianssand stiftamt. |
| 1800 | 1804 | Otto Joachim Moltke (1770–1853); Served concurrently as Stiftamtmann for Christianssand stiftamt. |
| 1804 | 1810 | Nicolai Emanuel de Thygeson (1772–1860); Served concurrently as Stiftamtmann for Christianssand stiftamt. |
| 1810 | 1812 | Hans Vilhelm Cederfeld de Simonsen (1777–1836); Served concurrently as Stiftamtmann for Christianssand stiftamt. |
| 1812 | 1815 | Oluf Borch de Schouboe (1777–1844); Served concurrently as Stiftamtmann for Christianssand stiftamt. |
| 1815 | 1837 | Ulrik Frederik Anton de Schouboe (1782–1863) |
| 1837 | 1848 | Henrik Harboe (1785–1848) |
| 1849 | 1860 | Iver Steen Thomle (1812–1889) |
| 1860 | 1863 | Henrik Laurentius Helliesen (1824–1900) |
| 1863 | 1868 | Niels Wisløff Rogstad (1814–1880) |
| 1868 | 1895 | Niels Cornelius Bonnevie (1827–1899) |
| 1896 | 1906 | Nicolai C.G. Prebensen (1850–1938) |
| 1906 | 1908 | Sigurd Lambrechts (1863–1941) |
| 1908 | 1916 | Sven Aarrestad (1850–1942) |
| 1917 | 1919 | Hans Thomas Knudtzon (1857–1921) |
County governors of Aust-Agder fylke
| 1919 | 1921 | Hans Thomas Knudtzon (1857–1921) |
| 1921 | 24 Jan 1942 | Jonas Pedersen (1871–1953) |
| 29 Jan 1942 | 7 May 1945 | Hans Henrik Petersen (1886–1969) (WWII Occupied government) |
| 8 May 1945 | 1 Dec 1945 | Eilif Løvrak Holmesland (1896–1959) (Acting governor after the occupation ended.) |
| 1945 | 1961 | Nils Hjelmtveit (1892–1985) |
| 1961 | 1974 | Henrik Svensen (1904–2007) |
| 1974 | 1983 | Ebba Lodden (1913–1997) |
| 1983 | 1994 | Signe Marie Stray Ryssdal (1924–2019) |
| 10 Jan 1995 | 31 Dec 2007 | Hjalmar Inge Sunde (born 1937) |
| 1 Jan 2008 | 30 Sep 2009 | Svein Åril (born 1946) (Acting for Djupedal while he finished his term in Parliament.) |
| 1 Oct 2009 | 31 Dec 2015 | Øystein Djupedal (born 1960) |
Office abolished on 1 January 2016, see List of county governors of Agder
