= Union of Norwegian Cities =

Norwegian employers' organisation

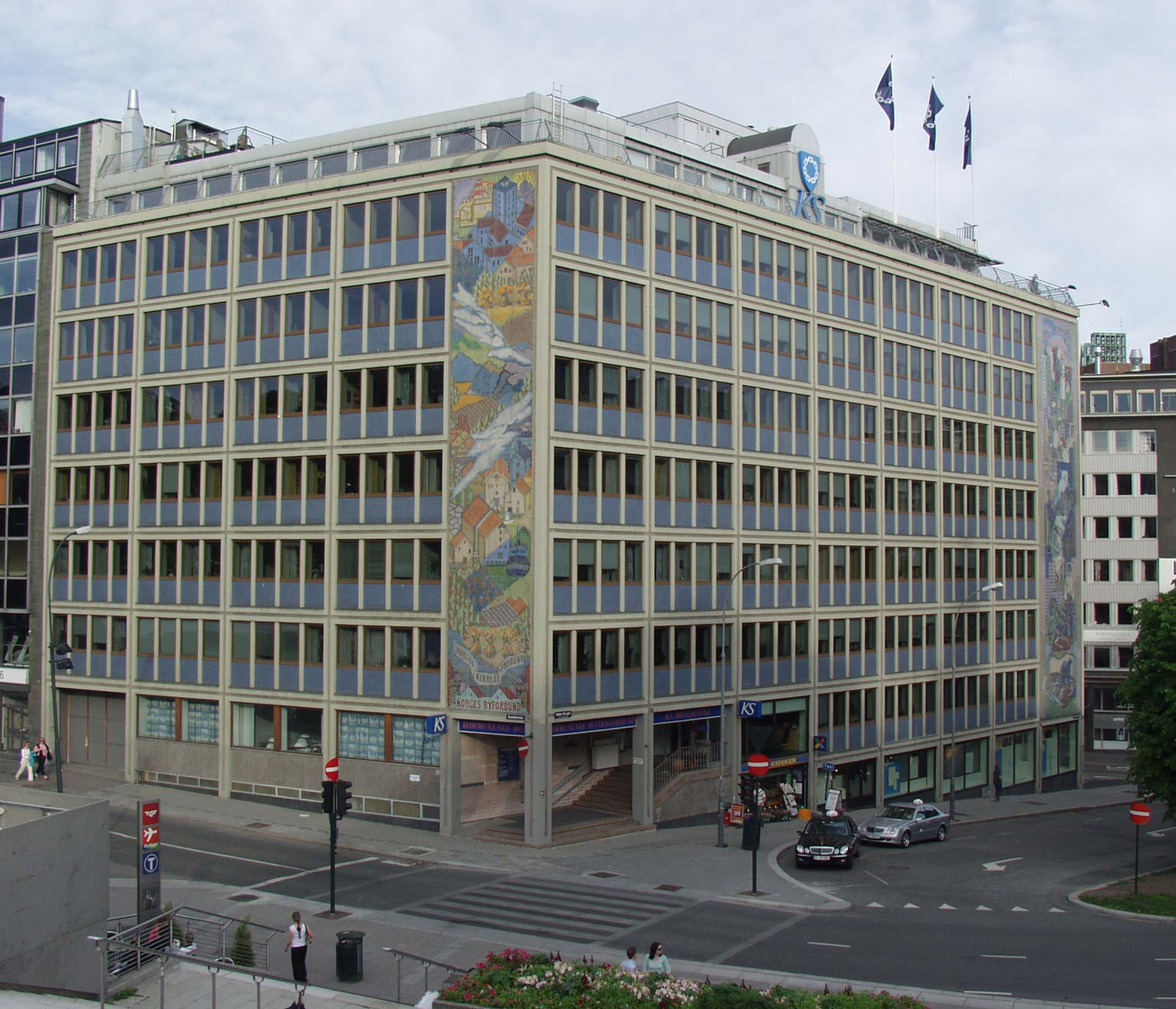
Kommunenes Hus.

The Union of Norwegian Cities (Norwegian: Norges Byforbund) was an employers' organisation in Norway.

It was founded in 1903. Hans Thomas Knudtzon has been credited with taking the initiative. Its headquarters were in the street Arbiens gate, later in the building Kommunenes Hus in Haakon VIIs gate. It was a member body of the International Union of Local Authorities.

In 1972 it was merged with the Norwegian Association of Rural Municipalities (Norges Herredsforbund, founded in 1923) to form the Norwegian Association of Local and Regional Authorities. The two entities were also merged between 1942 and 1945, during the German occupation of Norway.
