= Hans Hagerup Gyldenpalm =

Danish-born Norwegian jurist and civil servant

Hans Hagerup de Gyldenpalm
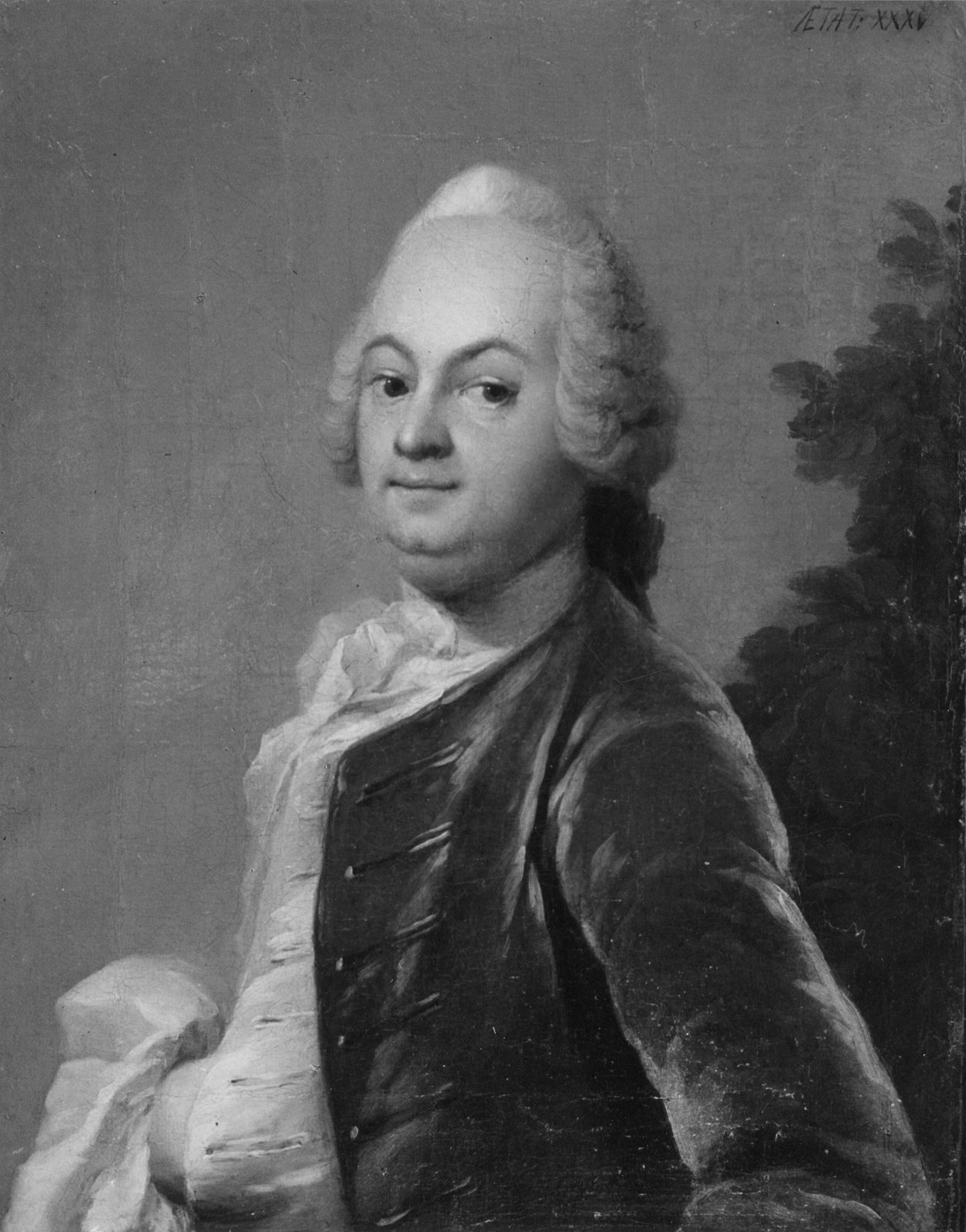

Governor of Nordland
- In office 1751–1767
- Preceded by: Ove Sørensen Schjelderup
- Succeeded by: Peter Holm

Personal details
- Born: 27 October 1717 Kalundborg, Denmark
- Died: 19 February 1781 (aged 63) Christianssand, Norway
- Citizenship: Norway
- Parent: Eiler Hansen Hagerup (father)
- Education: University of Copenhagen
- Profession: Politician

Hans Hagerup or posthumously Hans Hagerup Gyldenpalm (27 October 1717 – 19 February 1781) was a Danish-born, Norwegian jurist and civil servant. Upon his death, the King granted him a title of nobility, thus changing his surname and that of his descendants to Gyldenpalm.

== Biography ==
Hans Hagerup was born at Kalundborg on the island of Zealand in Denmark. He was a son of Eiler Hagerup (1685–1743). He belonged to an old family from Trondheim, but was born in Denmark, where his father was then a priest. During the 1720s, he followed the family to Trondheim when his father was appointed successor to Thomas von Westen as chief of the Christian mission among the Sami people.

After studies at home, he was in 1731 sent to the University of Copenhagen by his father, who during the same year was appointed the Bishop of the Diocese of Nidaros. In 1734, his father arranged for him to be hired as a teacher at the Trondheim Cathedral School. Hagerup later traveled to Copenhagen, where he earned his law degree during 1736. He served as County governor of Nordlands amt starting in 1751. He was appointed General War Commissioner (Norwegian: generalkrigskommissær) of Nordlands amt in 1762. He left those jobs during 1767 when he was appointed Diocesan Governor (Norwegian: stiftsamtmann) of Christianssands stiftamt as well as the County governor of Nedenes amt.

== Personal life ==
Hagerup was married twice. In 1740, he married Anne Cathrine Sommer (1707-1745), the widow of Bailiff and postmaster Jens Hannibalsen Hammer (1674-1738). In 1748, he married Anne Margrethe Høyer (1701-1764), the widow of another county governor named Christian Soelgaard (1687-1742). He was the grandfather of Hans Hagerup Falbe. He died in 1781 and was granted a title of nobility and after his death his family surname was changed to Gyldenpalm or de Gyldenpalm.

== See also ==
- Gyldenpalm (noble family)

Government offices
Preceded by Ove Sørensen Schjelderup	County Governor of Nordlands amt 1751–1767	Succeeded by Peter Holm
Preceded by Gustav Frederik Holck-Winterfeldt	Diocesan Governor of Christianssands stiftamt 1767–1781	Succeeded by Frederik Georg Adeler
Preceded by Gustav Frederik Holck-Winterfeldt	County Governor of Nedenes amt 1767–1781	Succeeded by Frederik Georg Adeler
