= Alexander Frederik Møsting =

Dano-Norwegian royal court official

Diocesan Governor of Christianssand stiftamt
- In office 1728–1730

Personal details
- Born: 20 November 1680 Denmark-Norway
- Died: 6 March 1737 (aged 56) Denmark-Norway
- Citizenship: Denmark-Norway
- Profession: Government official

Alexander Frederik Møsting (20 November 1680 - 6 March 1737) was a Dano-Norwegian royal court official.

== Early and personal life ==
Møsting was born in 1680 to army major Nicolai Abraham von Møsting, til Rønnovsholm and Kirsten Lauridsdatter Lunov. In 1414, he was married to Christine Elisabeth Juel /née Knuth, 1675–1738). She was the widow of Knud Juel with whom she had 10 children (including Carl Juel). She was the daughter of Joachim Frederik Knuth til Leizen (1642–84) and Christine v. Wancken (died 1689). His wife wife bore him two children. The son Frederik Christian von Møsting would later serve as county governor of Møn County. His sister Catharina Maria von Schulin wasmarried to foreign minister Johan Sigismund Schulin.

== Career ==
Møsting served as the Diocesan Governor of Christianssand stiftamt from 1728 to 1730. After leaving this position, he was appointed to the position of Hofmeister for King Christian VI's sister, Princess Charlotte Amalie of Denmark.

Government offices
Preceded by Johan Sigismund Hassius Lillienpalm	Diocesan Governor of Christianssand stiftamt 1728–1730	Succeeded by Johan Albrecht With
Preceded by Johan Sigismund Hassius Lillienpalm	County Governor of Nedenæs amt 1728–1730	Succeeded by Johan Albrecht With
