= Frederik Adeler =

Danish government official and landowner (1700–1766)

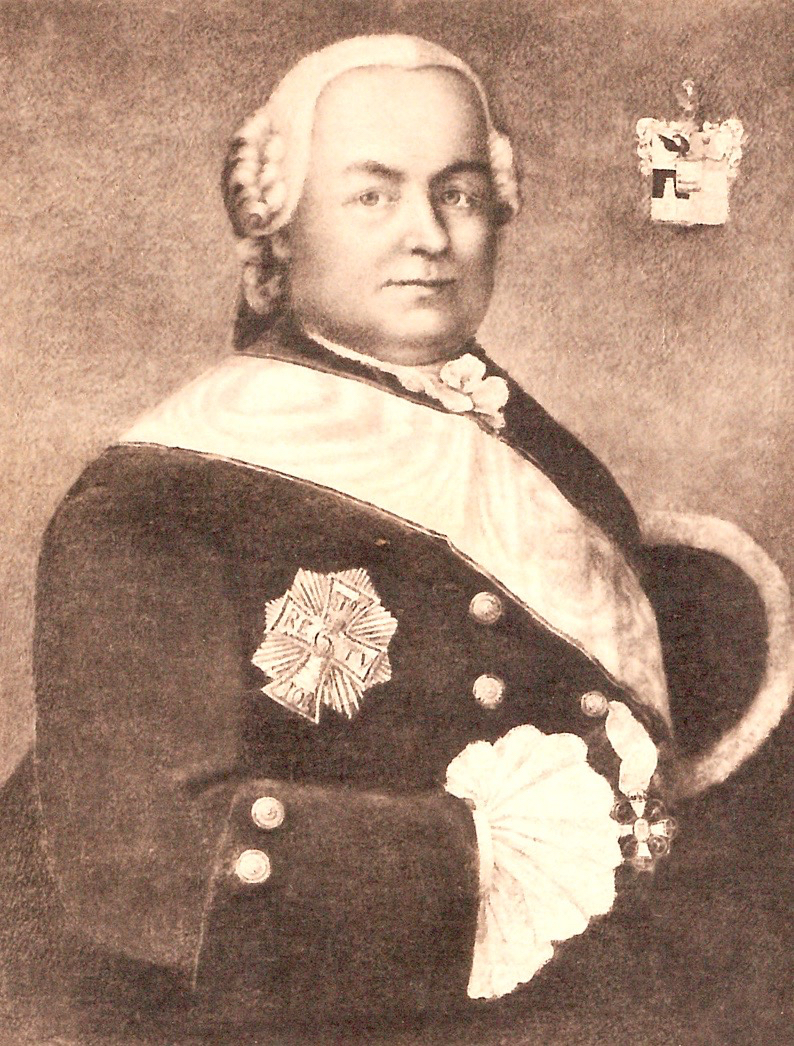

Diocesan Governor of Christianssand stiftamt
- In office 1751–1766

Personal details
- Born: 3 May 1700 Christianshavn, Denmark
- Died: 28 December 1766 (aged 66) Christianssand, Norway
- Citizenship: Denmark-Norway
- Spouse: Anne Beate Rosenkrantz
- Children: Conrad Wilhelm Adeler; Frederik Georg Adeler; Theodor Adeler
- Parent: Frederick Christian von Adeler (father)
- Profession: Government official

Frederik Adeler (1700–1766) was a Danish government official and landowner. He served as a County Governor and County Governor of several counties in Denmark and Norway (Denmark-Norway) from 1727 until his death in 1766.

== Early life and education ==
Adeler was born in Christianshavn as the youngest child of Privy Councilor Frederick Christian Adeler (died 1726). His paternal grandfather was Cort Adeler. He traveled abroad in 1722 with two of his brothers, visiting Germany and the Netherlands, England, France and Italy in 4 years.

== Career ==
Shortly after his return to Copenhagen, in 1726, he became chamberlain to Queen Anna Sophie. At the same time as his marriage in 1727, he became a state councilor and county governor of Kalundborg, Sæbygård, Dragsholm and Holbæk counties in Denmark. In 1749, he was made a Knight of the Order of the Dannebrog. In 1751, he exchanged jobs with his brother-in-law Joachim Hartwig Johann von Barner and he became the Diocesan Governor of Christianssand as well as the County Governor of Nedenæs amt. He died in Christiansand on 28 December 1766 and was buried with great solemnity at the Christianssand Cathedral on 20 January 1767.

== Property ==
In Denmark, Adeler owned Egemarke (from 1728) and Gundetved (from 1729) on Zealand. In 1735, he incorporated the manor of Algestrup. In Norway, he owned the manor located at the old Gimsøy Abbey in Skien in Bratsberg county.

== Personal life ==
On 25 April 1727, he married Anne Beate Rosenkrantz at Frederiksborg Castle in Denmark. She was a daughter of Jørgen Rosenkrantz. Together, they had several children including Frederik Georg Adeler. After her husband's death, she lived as a widow at Gimsøy Abbey and was praised as a wise and excellent lady, while it is said of her husband, notwithstanding several good qualities, that he was "known for his narrow-mindedness".

Government offices
Preceded by Johan Christopher Schønbach	County Governor of Kalundborg amt 1727–1751	Succeeded by Joachim Hartwig Johann von Barner
Preceded by Johan Christopher Schønbach	County Governor of Sæbygård amt 1727–1751	Succeeded by Joachim Hartwig Johann von Barner
Preceded by Johan Christopher Schønbach	County Governor of Dragsholm amt 1727–1751	Succeeded by Joachim Hartwig Johann von Barner
Preceded by Johan Christopher Schønbach	County Governor of Holbæk amt 1727–1751	Succeeded by Joachim Hartwig Johann von Barner
Preceded by Joachim Hartvig Johan von Barner	Diocesan Governor of Christianssand stiftamt 1751–1766	Succeeded by Gustav Frederik Holck-Winterfeldt
Preceded by Joachim Hartvig Johan von Barner	County Governor of Nedenæs amt 1751–1766	Succeeded by Gustav Frederik Holck-Winterfeldt
