= Gustav Frederik Holck-Winterfeldt =

Danish noble and government official

Count Gustav Frederik Holck-Winterfeldt
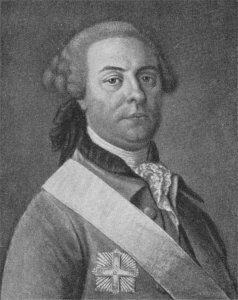

Governor of Christiassand stiftamt
- In office 1767–1767

Governor of Christiania stiftamt
- In office 1773–1773

Personal details
- Born: Gustav Frederik Holck; 1733 Denmark
- Died: 23 January 1776 (aged 42–43) Denmark
- Citizenship: Denmark-Norway
- Profession: Politician

Gustav Frederik Holck-Winterfeldt (1 September 1733 – 23 November 1776) was a Danish noble and government official. He served as the County Governor of several counties in Norway and Denmark. In 1772, he inherited the Barony of Wintersborg from his older brother and thus got the name Winterfeldt. For a time, he was also the owner of the Gjedsergaard manor.

== Early life ==
Gustav Frederik Holck was born on 1 September 1733 to Major general Christian Christopher Holck (1698–1774) and Ermegaard Sophie von Winterfeldt (1702–1756). He was one of eleven children, including Conrad Holck and Margrethe von der Lühe.

== Career ==
In 1759. Holck entered court service as court page (kammerjunker) for ccrown princ Christian (VI). 1766 saw him promoted to chamberlain and overskænk. In 1767, he became a member of the General Agricultural Commission (generallandvæsenskommissionen). In 1768, he was appointed a financial councillo ( deputeret for finanserne) and member of the Tax Directorate (overskattedirektionen).

During Struense's de facto rule of Denmark (1770–1772), he was removed from the central administration. In 1772, he was instead appointed county governor of Åbenrå and Løgumkloster counties. In 1773, he was sent to Norway as diocesan governor of Akershus.

== Property ==
In 1767, Holck bought Hovedgård from the crown, which he later sold in 1772. In 1769, he succeeded his elder brother Henning Holck-Winterfeldt to the Varony of Vintersborg and assumed the compound name Holck-Winterfeldt. He was a supporter of the great agricultural reforms of the time and a popular landlord among the farmers on his land.

== Personal life ==
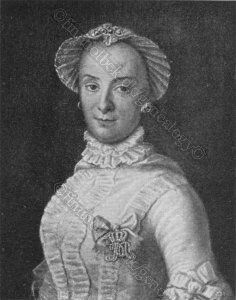
Frederikke Sophie Louise Ahlefeldt, Countess of Eskildsmark (1736–1793).

On 28 March 1760 in Christiansborg Chapel, Holck married Frederikke Elisabeth von der Lühe (1735–1762). She was the daughter of Adolph Andreas von der Lühe of Svanholm (1695–1750) and Frederikke Louise Weyse (1710–1791). He and Frederikke Elisabeth had one child, Christian, who lived to the age of 2.

After the death of his first wife, he remarried Sophie Louise countess Ahlefeldt (1736–1793) on 18 March 1763 in St. Peter's Church, Copenhagen. She was a daughter of Adam Christopher Ahlefeldt of Eskilsmark (1703–1778) and Margarethe Sophie von Holstein (1710–1777). The couple had 5 children: Frederik Christian (1764–1825), Juliane Marie (1765–1828), Christian Christopher Adam (1767–1789), Flemming Frederik Cai (1771–1826), and Gustav (1774–1833).

Gustav Frederik Holck-Winterfeldt died on 23 January 1776 at Sæbyholm and is buried at Halsted Church.

Government offices
Preceded by Frederik Adeler	Diocesan Governor of Christianssands stiftamt 1767	Succeeded by Hans Hagerup Gyldenpalm
Preceded by Frederik Adeler	County Governor of Nedenæs amt 1767	Succeeded by Hans Hagerup Gyldenpalm
Preceded by Diderik Otto von Grambow	Diocesan Governor of Christiania stiftamt 1773	Succeeded by Albrecht Philip von Levetzau
Preceded by Diderik Otto von Grambow	County Governor of Akershus amt 1773	Succeeded by Albrecht Philip von Levetzau
Preceded by Frederik Bardenfleth	County Governor of Aabenraa amt 1773–1775	Succeeded by Samuel Leopold von Schmettau
Preceded by Frederik Bardenfleth	County Governor of Løgumklosters amt 1773–1775	Succeeded by Samuel Leopold von Schmettau
