= Jonas Pedersen =

Norwegian politician

Governor of Aust-Agder
- In office 1921–1942
- Preceded by: Hans Thomas Knudtzon
- Succeeded by: Hans Henrik Petersen

Governor of Nordland
- In office 1913–1921
- Preceded by: Anton Omholt
- Succeeded by: Olaf Amundsen

Personal details
- Born: 20 September 1871 Stavanger, Norway
- Died: 1953 (aged 81–82) Norway
- Citizenship: Norway
- Profession: Politician

Jonas Pedersen (20 September 1871–1953) was a Norwegian politician for the Liberal Party. He served as the County Governor of Nordland county from 1913 until 1921 and then he was the County Governor of Aust-Agder county from 1921 until 1942.

He was born in Stavanger. He enrolled as a law student in 1889, and graduated as cand.jur. in 1893. He moved to Northern Norway in 1895 and was acting district stipendiary magistrate (sorenskriver) and stipendiary magistrate (foged).

On the local political level he was a member of the municipal council for Vågan Municipality from 1901 to 1907, and then mayor of Vågan Municipality from 1910 to 1913. From 1913 to 1921 he was County Governor of Nordland. He was acting County Governor from 1913, but formally appointed in 1916. In November 1921 he was appointed County Governor of Aust-Agder, assuming the position in March 1922. He left in January 1942, during the German occupation of Norway.

He was elected to the Norwegian Parliament in 1928 from the Market towns of Telemark and Aust-Agder counties. He sat only one term, but he had been deputy representative from 1913 to 1915.

Government offices
Preceded by Anton Omholt	County Governor of Nordland; 1913–1921 (acting governor from 1913-1916)	Succeeded by Olaf Amundsen
Preceded by Hans Thomas Knudtzon	County Governor of Aust-Agder; 1921–1942	Succeeded by Hans Henrik Petersen
