= List of diocesan governors of Kristiansand =

The diocesan governor of Kristiansand stiftamt was a government agency of the Kingdom of Norway. The title was Stiftamtmann (before 1919) and in 1919 all stiftamt were abolished in favor of equal counties (Norwegian: fylker).

The stiftamt (diocesan county) of Stavanger was established in 1662 by the King. It was originally made up of three subordinate counties: Stavanger amt, Bratsberg amt, and Agdesiden amt. In 1671, Agdesiden was divided into two new counties: Lister og Mandal amt and Nedenæs amt. Stavanger stiftamt was led by a stiftamtmann and the subordinate counties were led by an amtmann. The stiftamtmann oversaw the subordinate counties and was the Kings representative there. The seat of the stiftamt and diocese originally was the city of Stavanger. In 1682, the seat of the stiftamt was moved from Stavanger to Christianssand, a much more centralized location. When this change occurred, the name of the stiftamt was changed to Christianssand stiftamt. In 1877, the spelling of the name was changed to Kristianssand stiftamt to reflect one of the Norwegian language reforms. Then again in 1889, the spelling was changed to Kristiansand stiftamt. In 1919, there was a large county reorganization in Norway and every stiftamt was abolished and the counties were renamed fylker.

== List of diocesan governors ==
The following is a list of the governors of the Kristiansand stiftamt.

Diocesan governors of Stavanger stiftamt
Start	End	Name
1671	1679	Ove Juul (1615–1688); Served concurrently as Amtmann for Nedenæs amt.
1680	1682	Ludvig Holgersen Rosenkrantz (1628–1685); Served concurrently as Amtmann for Lister og Mandals amt.
Diocesan Governors of Christianssand stiftamt
1682	1685	Ludvig Holgersen Rosenkrantz (1628–1685); Served concurrently as Amtmann for Lister og Mandals amt.
1685	1694	Christian Stockfleth (1639–1704); Served concurrently as Amtmann for Lister og Mandals amt (1685-1692).
1685	1692	Claus Røyem (1638–1692) (acting for Stockfleth while he served as envoy to Sweden); Served concurrently as acting Amtmann for Lister og Mandals amt.
1694	1700	Mats de Tonsberg (1640–1705); Served concurrently as Amtmann for Nedenæs amt.
1700	1711	Christian Frederik Powisch (c. 1650–1711); Served concurrently as Amtmann for Nedenæs amt.
1711	1718	Henrik Adeler (1660–1718); Served concurrently as Amtmann for Nedenæs amt.
1718	1728	Johan Sigismund Hassius Lillienpalm (1664–1729); Served concurrently as Amtmann for Nedenæs amt.
1728	1730	Alexander Frederik Møsting (1680–1737); Served concurrently as Amtmann for Nedenæs amt.
1730	1738	Johan Albrecht With (1683–1754); Served concurrently as Amtmann for Nedenæs amt.
1738	1742	Carl Juel (1706–1767); Served concurrently as Amtmann for Nedenæs amt.
1742	1746	Heinrich von Reuss (1707–1783); Served concurrently as Amtmann for Nedenæs amt.
1746	1751	Joachim Hartvig Johan von Barner (1699–1768); Served concurrently as Amtmann for Nedenæs amt.
1751	1766	Frederik Adeler (1700–1766); Served concurrently as Amtmann for Nedenæs amt.
1767	1767	Gustav Frederik Holck-Winterfeldt (1733–1776); Served concurrently as Amtmann for Nedenæs amt.
1767	1781	Hans Hagerup Gyldenpalm (1717–1781); Served concurrently as Amtmann for Nedenæs amt.
1781	1788	Frederik Georg Adeler (1736–1810); Served concurrently as Amtmann for Nedenæs amt.
1788	1789	Frederik Moltke (1754–1836); Served concurrently as Amtmann for Nedenæs amt.
1789	1800	Hans Christoph Diderik Victor von Levetzow (1754–1829); Served concurrently as Amtmann for Nedenæs amt.
1800	1804	Otto Joachim Moltke (1770–1853); Served concurrently as Amtmann for Nedenæs amt.
1804	1810	Nicolai Emanuel de Thygeson (1772–1860); Served concurrently as Amtmann for Nedenæs amt.
1810	1812	Hans Vilhelm Cederfeld de Simonsen (1777–1836); Served concurrently as Amtmann for Nedenæs amt.
1812	1836	Oluf Borch de Schouboe (1777–1844); Served concurrently as Amtmann for Nedenæs amt (1812-1815). Served concurrently as Amtmann for Lister og Mandals amt (1815-1836).
1837	1846	Niels Arntzen Sem (1782–1859); Served concurrently as Amtmann for Lister og Mandals amt.
1846	1852	Carl Valentin Falsen (1787–1852); Served concurrently as Amtmann for Lister og Mandals amt.
1852	1859	Mathias Bille Kjørboe (1794–1859); Served concurrently as Amtmann for Lister og Mandals amt.
1860	1871	Niels Petersen Vogt (1817–1894); Served concurrently as Amtmann for Lister og Mandals amt.
1871	1881	Jakob Krefting Bonnevie (1814–1881); Served concurrently as Amtmann for Lister og Mandals amt.
1882	1889	Johan Christian Georg Hvoslef (1819–1889); Served concurrently as Amtmann for Lister og Mandals amt.
1889	1906	Hans Georg Jacob Stang (1830–1907); Served concurrently as Amtmann for Lister og Mandals amt.
1907	1918	Daniel Bremer Juell Koren (1858–1948); Served concurrently as Amtmann for Lister og Mandals amt.
Office abolished on 1 January 1919.
