= Christian Frederik Powisch =

Norwegian government official

Diocesan Governor of Christianssand stiftamt
- In office 1700–1711

Personal details
- Born: 1650 Denmark
- Died: 11 February 1711 (aged 60–61) Christianssand, Norway
- Citizenship: Denmark-Norway
- Profession: Government official

Christian Frederik Powisch or Christian Frederik Pogwisch (1650-1711) was a government official of Denmark–Norway. He served as the County Governor of Stavanger amt from 1687 until 1700. Then, he was appointed as the Diocesan Governor of Christianssand stiftamt (and simultaneously served as the County Governor of Nedenæs amt) from 1700 until his death in 1711.

Government offices
Preceded by Daniel Knoff	County Governor of Stavanger amt 1687–1700	Succeeded by Edvard Hammond
Preceded by Mats de Tonsberg	Diocesan Governor of Christianssand stiftamt 1700–1711	Succeeded by Henrik Adeler
Preceded by Mats de Tonsberg	County Governor of Nedenæs amt 1700–1711	Succeeded by Henrik Adeler
