= Joachim Hartvig Johan von Barner =

Danish-German military officer and government official

Governor of Christianssand stiftamt
- In office 1745–1751

Personal details
- Born: 25 March 1699 Mecklenburg, Holy Roman Empire
- Died: 17 December 1768 (aged 69) Denmark
- Citizenship: Denmark-Norway
- Profession: Politician

Joachim Hartvig Johan von Barner (1699–1768) was a Danish-German military officer and government official. He served as the County Governor of several counties in Norway and Denmark.

Barner was born in Mecklenburg which was part of the Holy Roman Empire, but moved to Denmark in his youth. He started out as a military officer, serving in the Danish military until 1746. In 1746, he was appointed as the Diocesan Governor of Christianssand stiftamt (and simultaneously serving as the County Governor of Nedenæs amt). He was then transferred to Denmark where he served as the County Governor of Kalundborg, Dragsholm, Sæbygaard and Holbaek counties. He held that post until he died in 1768.

Government offices
Preceded by Heinrich von Reuss	Diocesan Governor of Christianssand stiftamt 1746–1751	Succeeded by Frederik Adeler
Preceded by Heinrich von Reuss	County Governor of Nedenæs amt 1746–1751	Succeeded by Frederik Adeler
Preceded by Frederik Adeler	County Governor of Kalundborg, Dragsholm, Sæbygaard and Holbaek amter 1751–1768	Succeeded by Eiler Christopher von Ahlefeldt
