= Algestrup (manor house) =

Manor house and estate close to Kalundborg, Denmark

- Interactive map of the Algestrup area

General information
- Location: Galtebjergvej 5; 4591 Føllenslev, Denmark
- Coordinates: 55°43′2.21″N 11°18′33.7″E

Design and construction
- Architect: Rudolf Unmack

Algestrup is a manor house and estate located close to Kalundborg, Denmark.

== History ==
=== Adeler and Berner families, 1627-1809 ===
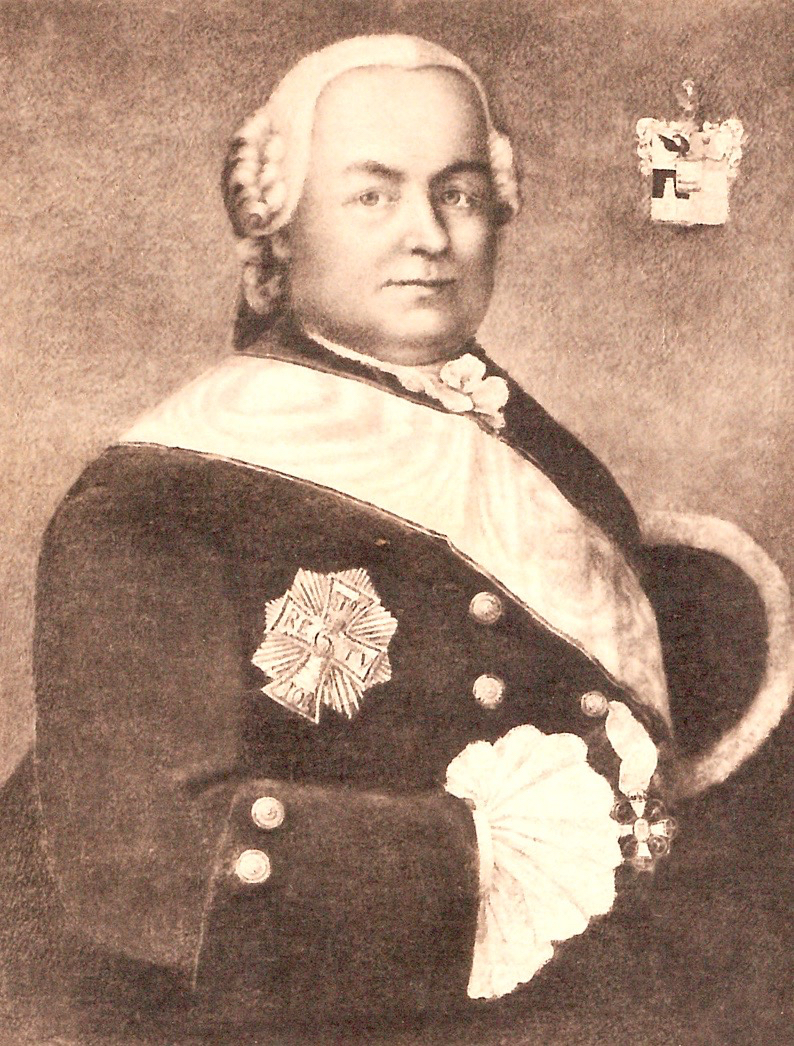
Frederik Adeler

Algestrup was originally the name of a village. In 1688, it consisted of nine farms. After the Reformation, it was confiscated by the Crown and included in Dragsjolm Fief. From 1700, it belonged to the newly established Egemarks Manor.

Un 1719, Egemarke was sold at auction to Frederik Christian Adeler. Adeler was the owner of nearby Dragsholm and served as prefect of Zealand. After his death in 1726, Egemarke was passed to his son Frederik Adeler. In 1735, Adeler was granted royal permission to replace the village of Algestrup by a manor of the same name.

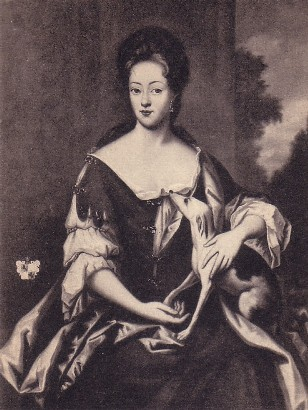
Henriette Margrethe von Barner

In 1759, he was sent to Norway as amtmann. He then ceded Algestrup and Egemærke to his son-in-law, Helmuth Gotthardt von Barner. A military officer, Barner reached the rank of lieutenant-colonel in 1756 and colonel in 1769. In 1756, Adeler was granted royal permission to dissolve the village and turn it into a new manor. The land that had belonged to Gammelrands was also included in the new estate.

Berner's wife, Louise Christiane von Adeler, died just 28 years old in May 1759. He was later married second time with Henriette Margrethe von Lente-Adeler, a daughter of Theodor von Lente-Adeler of Lykkesholm and Leopoldine Cathrine Jørgensdatter Rosenkrantz. Sje kept the estate after her husband's death. In 1773, she ceded it to their son Theodor von Barner.

=== Changing owners, 1809-1867 ===
Johannes Schartau, a merchant from Copenhagen, purchased the estate in 1809. He was like many others hit by the economic crisis of the 1810s and in 1823 Algestrup was sold in a forced sale. The buyer was the crown and a new main building was subsequently built on the estate.

In 1842, Algestrup was again sold in a public auction. The buyer was this time timber merchant Hans Hansen. In 1854, Algestrup was sold to Vilhelm Maag.

=== Lemvigh family, 1867-present ===
Jacob Christian Henrik Lemvigh (1866–1935), a son of a parish priest in Krummestrup and Fuglebjerg, purchased Algestrup in 1867. He had previously leased Holtegaard. In 1919, he ceded the ceded Algestrup to his daughter Charlotte Lemvigh. On her death, it was passed to her niece, Edith Hedemann Lemvigh, who in turn left it to her nephew Ib Holger Lemvigh (1929-2015). He was succeeded by his son of the same name.

A side wing was hit by fire in 2019.

== Architecture ==
The main building from 1834 is a white-washed, three-winged complex in a single storey. It has been adapted and extended in 1867, 1876 og 1884. Four rooms contain murals of flowers and birds by the artist Erik Herløw Mads Jensen Tanggaard. The architect constructed a new veranda in 1956.

== List of owners ==
- (1728-1759) Frederik Adeler
- (1759-1769) Helmuth Gotthardt von Barner
- (1769-1782) Henriette Margrethe von Barner, née Lente-Adeler
- (1782-1809) Leopold Theodor von Barner
- (1809) Regitze Sophie von Barner (née Krabbe)
- (1809-1823) Johannes Schartau
- (1823-1842) The Crown
- (1842-1854) Hans Hansen
- (1854-1867) Vilhelm Maag
- (1867-1919) Jacob Christian Henrik Lemvigh
- (1919-1935) Elisabeth Charlotte Lemvigh
- (1935-1964) Ib Holger Lemvigh
- (1964-2005) Ib Holger Lemvigh Jr.
- (2000–present) Jacob Christian Henrik Lemvigh
