= Mats de Tonsberg =

Norwegian civil servant

- Born: 1638; Tønsberg, Norway
- Died: 1705 (aged 66–67); Bergen, Norway
- Occupations: Civil servant Timber trader
- Children: Vilhelm de Tonsberg
- Relatives: Christian Stockfleth (brother-in-law); Karen Toller (niece)

Mats de Tonsberg or Mathias de Tonsberg (1638–1705) was a Norwegian civil servant and timber trader.

He was born in Tønsberg in Jarlsberg og Larvik county in Norway to civil servant Anders Madssøn (1609-1670) and Karen Stranger (1617-1698). He was a brother-in-law of Christian Stockfleth, and uncle of Karen Toller. Born into a wealthy family, he studied at the University of Copenhagen from 1655, and subsequently politics and history at the Leiden University from 1661.

After visiting several European universities, he returned to Norway in 1668, and was assigned an administrative position at the Akershus Castle. He was a member of Overhofretten court from 1684 until 1692. In 1704, he was named a member of Slottsloven. Tonsberg received the title of Chancellor in 1684 and rank of Councillor of State in 1704.

== Career ==
In 1679 he was appointed as County Governor of Buskeruds amt, residing in the town of Drammen. He served there until 1694 when he was appointed as the Diocesan Governor of Christianssand stiftamt and simultaneously the County Governor of Nedenes og Bamble amt. He held both posts until 1700 when he was dismissed from his job due to his health. In 1704, he was appointed to be the Diocesan Governor of Bergenhus stiftamt and simultaneously the County Governor of Bergenhus amt. He only held this post for a few months before his health failed and forced him to resign in December of 1704. His son, Vilhelm de Tonsberg, replaced him as Diocesan Governor. He died a few months later in 1705 in Bergen.

Besides his public services, he was running a timber trading business. From his base in Drammen, he ran exports of lumber and collaboration with the city's leading merchants and ship owners.

Government offices
New office	County Governor of Buskerud amt 1679–1695	Succeeded by Paul Glud
Preceded by Claus Røyem; Acting governor (for Christian Stockfleth)	Diocesan Governor of Christianssand stiftamt 1694–1700	Succeeded by Christian Frederik Powisch
Preceded by Claus Røyem; Acting governor (for Christian Stockfleth)	County Governor of Nedenes og Bamble amt 1694–1700	Succeeded by Christian Frederik Powisch
Preceded by Christian Stockfleth	Diocesan Governor of Bergenhus stiftamt 1704–1704	Succeeded by Vilhelm de Tonsberg
Preceded by Christian Stockfleth	County Governor of Bergenhus amt 1704–1704	Succeeded by Vilhelm de Tonsberg
