= Ove Juul =

Danish nobleman

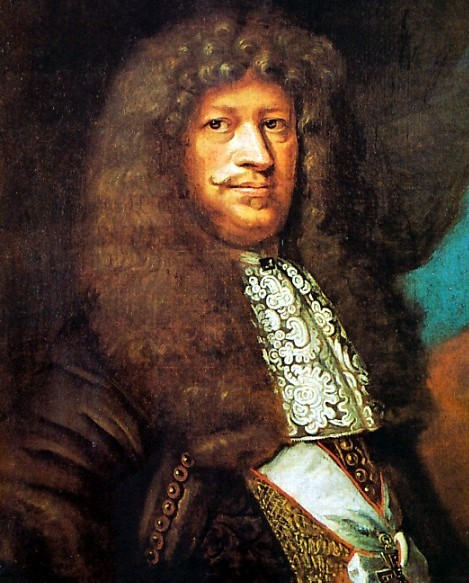

Vice Governor-general of Norway
- In office 1669–1674
- Governor-General: Ulrik Frederik Gyldenløve

Personal details
- Born: 23 October 1615 Willestrup, Mariagerfjord Municipality, Denmark
- Died: 29 May 1686 (aged 70) Willestrup, Mariagerfjord Municipality, Denmark

Ove Iversen Juul (23 October 1615 – 29 May 1686) was a Danish nobleman who served as Vice Governor-general of Norway under Ulrik Fredrik Gyldenløve from 1669 to 1674.

== Family and youth ==
Ove's father was Iver Juul at Villestrup, Thaarupgaard and Lundbæk (1563–1627). Iver had two sons who rose to positions of importance in Denmark-Norway: Ove Juul (1615–1689) of Lundbæk-Pandum, Villestrup, Kragerup and Bregentved, and Tønne Juul (1620–1684) of Thaarupgaard. Ove’s paternal grandfather was Axel Juul, (1503–1577) an Army officer in charge of Aalborghus Castle, who originally built Villestrup.

Ove attended Sorø Academy in Sorø, Danmark. He traveled first to Wittenberg where he studied at the University of Wittenberg. He then continued to England, the Netherlands, France and Italy. The diary which was maintained provides an interesting insight on the art and mores of the period.

== Career ==
In 1661, he became the Diocesan Governor in Ålborg. Subsequently Juul served as Vice Governor-general in Norway under Ulrik Fredrik Gyldenløve from 1669 to 1674. From 1671 until 1679, he was the Diocesan Governor of Stavanger stiftamt as well as the County Governor of Nedenæs amt. From 1676 through 1679, he was the Vice Chancellor of Danish Chancellery (Danish: Danske Kancelli) in Copenhagen. During the period of Danish absolutism, the Chancellery, along with the Treasury (Danish: Rentekammeret), the Commercial College (Danish: Kommmercekollegiat) served to provide a coordinated central administration in Denmark which provided, among other things, direction to the Governor-general in Norway. This administration reported via the Privy Council (Konseil-Geheimråd) to the King, who held absolute power.

From 1681, he served as assessor (Høiesteretsassessor—an assessor was a councilor of the realm who served in one of the two positions reserved for nobility) of Århus.

Government offices
New office	Diocesan Governor of Aalborg stiftamt 1661–1669	Succeeded by Peder Charisius
New office	Diocesan Governor of Stavanger stiftamt 1671–1679	Succeeded by Jens Toller Rosenheim
New office	County Governor of Nedenæs amt 1671–1679	Succeeded by Jens Toller Rosenheim
