= Heinrich von Reuss =

German noble and Danish government official

Imperial Count Heinrich VI Reuss of Plauen and Köstritz
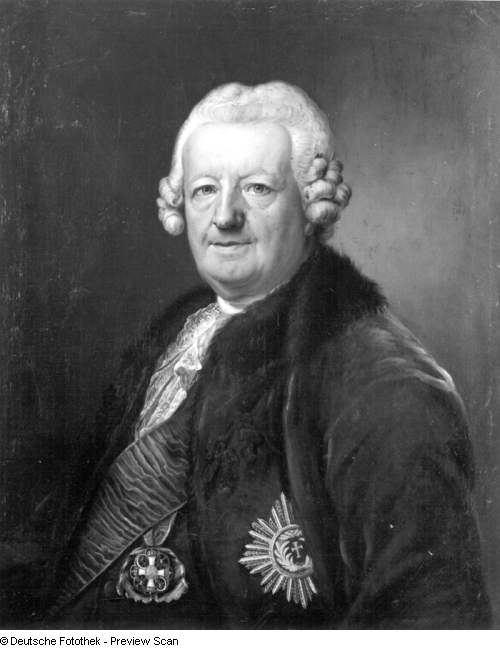

Diocesan Governor of Christianssand stiftamt
- In office 1742–1746

Personal details
- Born: Heinrich VI von Reuß-Köstritz; 1 July 1707 Dzietrzychowice, Holy Roman Empire
- Died: 17 May 1783 (aged 75) Bad Köstritz, Holy Roman Empire
- Parent: Heinrich XXIV, Count Reuss of Köstritz (father)
- Profession: Politician

Heinrich von Reuss (1707–1783) was a German noble and Danish government official. He served as the County Governor of several counties in Norway and Denmark.

Starting from a distinctly pietistic home, he was sent in 1732 to Denmark. He was appointed chamberlain in 1739 and a year later he was made a knight of the Order of the Dannebrog. In 1742 he was appointed Diocesan Governor of Christianssand stiftamt (and simultaneously named County Governor of Nedenæs amt) in southern Norway. He held that post until 1746 when he was transferred to Denmark be the County Governor of Sorø amt. The following year he was named as chief court officer at the newly formed Sorø Academy. During his stay in this country, Count Reuss acquired the Danish language so well that at the inauguration of the academy in 1747 he gave the opening speech in Danish.

Büsching describes the count as a gentleman not without learned knowledge, also God-fearing and a human friend, but too dependent on his rich wife. From 1748 to 1754 he was county governor of Ringsted County. Then in 1754, he was transferred to be the county governor of Sønderborg County. In 1747, he was named a Geheimrat and in 1779 received the Order of the Elephant. In 1765 he left Denmark and moved to Prussia where he entered service there as a government minister. He died 17 May 1783.

Government offices
Preceded by Carl Juel	Diocesan Governor of Christianssand stiftamt 1742–1746	Succeeded by Joachim Hartvig Johan von Barner
Preceded by Carl Juel	County Governor of Nedenæs amt 1742–1746	Succeeded by Joachim Hartvig Johan von Barner
Preceded by Christoph Ernst von Beulwitz	County Governor of Sorø amt 1746–1748	Office abolished Merged into Ringsted amt
Preceded by Tomas Lillienskiold	County Governor of Ringsted amt 1748–1754	Succeeded by Carl Juel
Preceded by Duke Christian August I of Schleswig-Holstein-Sonderburg-Augustenburg	County Governor of Sønderborg amt 1754–1765	Succeeded by Johan Wilhelm Teuffel von Pirckensee
