= Otto Joachim Moltke =

Danish politician

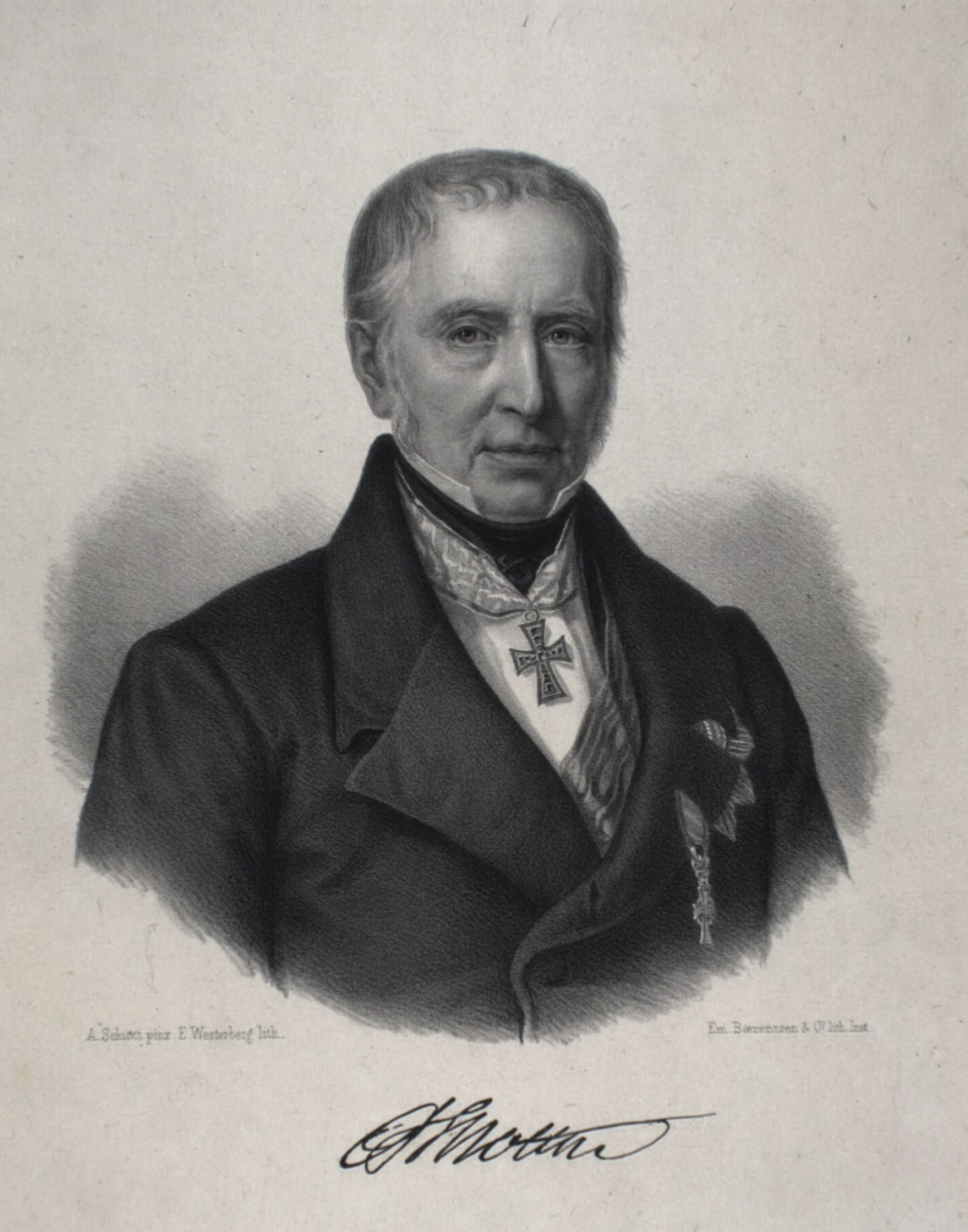

Prime minister of Denmark
- In office 1824–1842
- Preceded by: Ernst Heinrich von Schimmelmann
- Succeeded by: Poul Christian von Stemann

Diocesan Governor of Christianssand stiftamt
- In office 1800–1804

Personal details
- Born: 11 June 1770 Copenhagen, Denmark
- Died: 1 February 1853 (aged 82) Espe, Denmark
- Citizenship: Denmark-Norway
- Profession: Government official

Otto Joachim Moltke (11 June 1770 – 1 February 1853) was a lawyer and government official. He was the Minister of State of Denmark from 1824 to 1842.

== Biography ==
He was born at Moltkes Palæ in Copenhagen, Denmark. He was the son of Adam Gottlob Moltke (1710–1792) and Sophie Hedevig von Raben (1733–1802). His father was lensgreve til Bregentved and had exercised extensive political power during the reign of Frederick V. Moltke studied at the University of Copenhagen from 1786 and in 1788 became a legal candidate. He then made a study trip abroad.

He moved to Norway where he was appointed the County Governor of Bratsberg amt from 1798 until 1800. In 1800, Moltke received the rank of chamberlain and appointed to be the Diocesan Governor of Christianssands Stiftamt (and simultaneously the County Governor of Nedenes Amt. He held that job until 1804. In 1813, he was appointed in charge of the Schleswig-Holstein-Lauenborg Chancellor (Slesvig-Holsten-Lauenborgske Cancelli). He was secretary of state from 1824 to 1830, and an outstanding member of the Privy Councillor of Denmark 1824–1842.

He became Commander of the Order of the Dannebrog in 1810, received the Great Cross in 1815 and became Knight of the Order of the Elephant in 1826.

== Personal life ==
In 1797, Moltke married Christiane Sophie Juul (1778–1810), daughter of Major Colonel Christian Frederik Juul and Catharina Wilhelmine Wedel-Jarlsberg. He was married for the second time in 1816, to Sophie Henriette von Düring (1777–1853), daughter of Chamberlain and later General Ernst Christoph Friederich von Düring and Henriette Sophie von Reden.

Otto Joachim Moltke retired to Espe Hovedgård in the parish of Boeslunde, which he had acquired in 1810. He died in 1853 and was buried at Boeslunde Church in the village of Boeslunde in Slagelse, Denmark.

Political offices
Preceded by Ernst Heinrich von Schimmelmann	Privy Councillor of Denmark; 1824-1842	Succeeded by Poul Christian von Stemann
Government offices
Preceded by Jonas Ramus Petersen	County Governor of Bratsberg amt 1798–1800	Succeeded by Johan Henrik Selmer
Preceded by Hans Christoph Diderik Victor von Levetzow	Diocesan Governor of Christianssand stiftamt 1800–1804	Succeeded by Nicolai Emanuel de Thygeson
Preceded by Hans Christoph Diderik Victor von Levetzow	County Governor of Nedenæs amt 1800–1804	Succeeded by Nicolai Emanuel de Thygeson
