= Johan Albrecht With =

Danish military personnel

Diocesan Governor of Christianssand stiftamt
- In office 1730–1738

Diocesan Governor of Viborg stiftamt
- In office 1746–1754

Personal details
- Born: 23 December 1683 Sværdborg, Denmark
- Died: 6 August 1754 (aged 70) Viborg, Denmark
- Citizenship: Denmark-Norway
- Profession: Politician

Johan Albrecht With (1683–1754) was a Danish military officer and governor. He served as the County Governor of several counties in Norway and Denmark.

He began studying at the university in 1698, and after some time, he then enlisted in the military in 1710 and was a lieutenant in the Danish cavalry. By 1719, he had advanced to the rank of lieutenant colonel in Jutland's National Cavalry Regiment. In 1721, he left the military and the following year he got a job as a translator at the Øresund customs office.

King Christian VI of Denmark appointed him in 1730 to serve in Norway as the Diocesan Governor of Christianssand stiftamt (and simultaneously as the County Governor of Nedenæs amt). In 1738, he resigned and moved to Nyborg where he bought a couple of farms. In 1746, he was appointed to be the Diocesan Governor of Viborg stiftamt (and also served as the County Governor of Hald amt at the same time). In 1747, he received the Order of the Dannebrog. He died on 6 August 1754 in Viborg.

Government offices
Preceded by Alexander Frederik Møsting	Diocesan Governor of Christianssand stiftamt 1730–1738	Succeeded by Carl Juel
Preceded by Alexander Frederik Møsting	County Governor of Nedenæs amt 1730–1738	Succeeded by Carl Juel
Preceded by Vilhelm Güldencrone	Diocesan Governor of Viborg stiftamt 1746–1754	Succeeded by Caspar Herman von Heinen
Preceded by Vilhelm Güldencrone	County Governor of Hald amt 1746–1754	Succeeded by Caspar Herman von Heinen
