= Frederik Julius Kaas =

Danish politician (1785–1827)

His Grace Frederik Julius Kaas R.E..
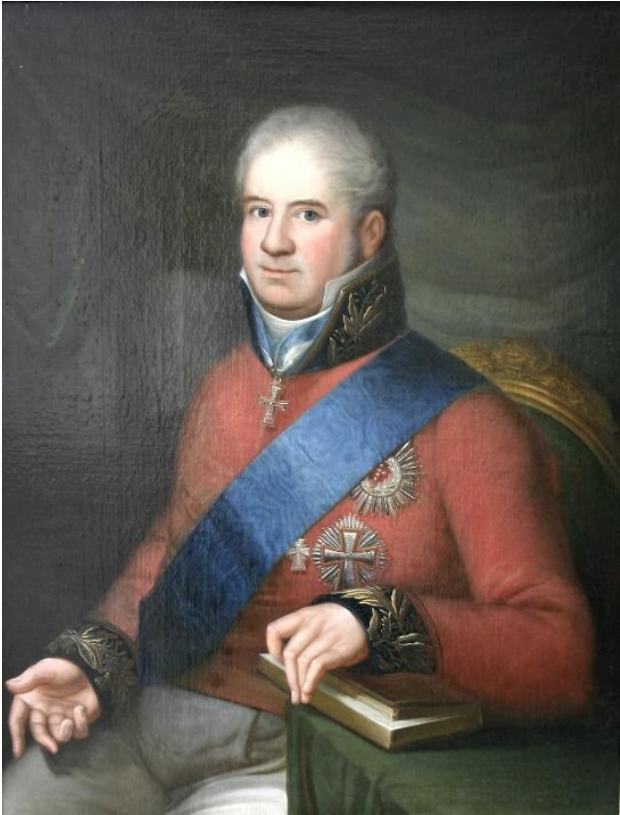
- Portrait by unknown artist

Prime Minister of Denmark
- In office 1814–1814
- Monarch: Frederick VII
- Preceded by: Frederik Moltke
- Succeeded by: Joachim Godske Moltke

Personal details
- Born: 24 August 1785 Copenhagen, Denmark
- Died: 11 January 1827 (aged 41) Copenhagen, Denmark
- Resting place: Holmen Cemetery, Copenhagen, Denmark
- Spouse(s): Christian Kaas (1725–1803) and Susanna Jacoba Fabritius
- Parent(s): Frederik Christian Kaas; Susanna Jacoba Fabritius
- Relatives: Ulrich Kaas (grandfather); Ulrik Christian Kaas (uncle)

Frederik Julius Kaas (24 August 1785 – 11 January 1827) was a politician from Denmark who served as Prime Minister of Denmark from 1814 to 1827 and Chairman of the Privy Council.

== Early life and education ==
Kaas was born on 24 August 1758 in Copenhagen, the son of captain Frederik Christian Kaas (1725–1803) and Susanna Jacoba Fabritius (1741–62). His father would later reach the rank of admiral in the Royal Danish Navy. Kaas began his career at the royal court. He later joined the engineering troops. He discontinued his military career (with rank of junior lieutenant) to study law at the University of Copenhagen, earning his law degree in 1782.

== Career ==
Kaas spent the 20 first years of his career in Norway, then part of Denmark-Norway. In 1782, he became a judge at the Norwegian Overhofret. In 1787 he left the post to focus on the management of Bærum Ironworks, which he had acquired through his marriage to Kirstine Nilson. In 1789–90, he was a Supreme Court justice for Denmark-Norway. In 1789, he returned to the Norwegian Overhofret. In 1790, he was appointed to the post as associated lagmand of Akershus lagdømme. In 1792–94, he was chairman of the City Council in Kristiania. In 1794, he became auditor-general and member of the Norwegian Gneralitets- og Kommissariatskollegium. From 1795 to 1802, he served as diocesan governor of Akershus.

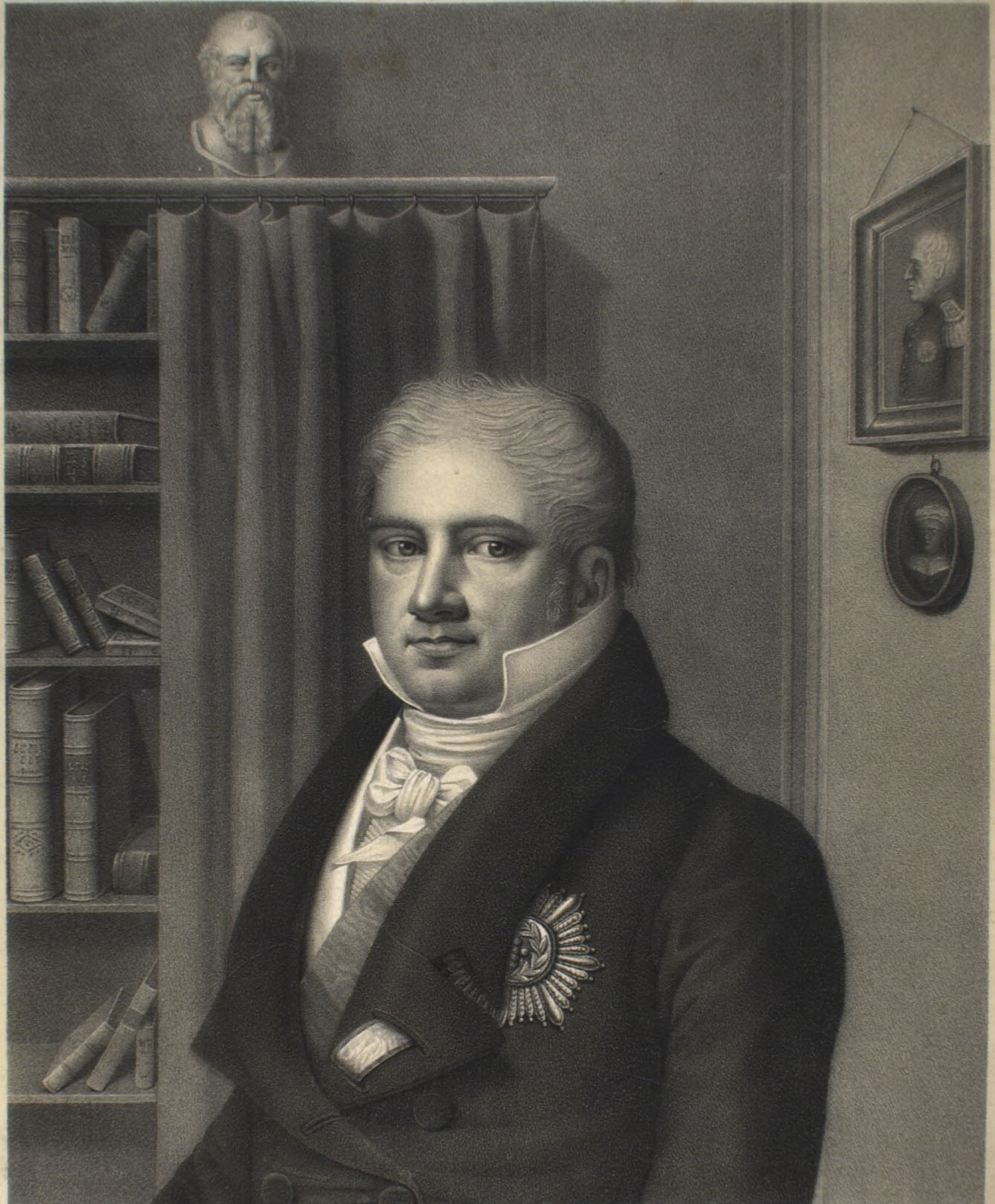

In 1802, Kaas was called back to Copenhagen and Denmark to serve as president of the Supreme Court for Denmark-Norwway. Gebgard Moltke replaced him as diocesan governor of Akershus. In 1804, Kaas became president of the Danske Kancelli. In 1809–10, he was temporarily back in Norway. In 1811 and 1813, and he was sent on diplomatic missions to Paris. In 1814, he was made a member of the Heheimestaten, In 1813, he was given title of Minister of Justice. In 1815, he was also appointed to the post as head of the Copenhagen Police Force, concurrently to his posts as Minister of Justice and president of Danske Kancelli. Kaas was also made a member of a number of important commissions.

Outside the central administration, Kaas was appointed as one of the directors of the Classenske Fideicommis, in 1802, and, in 1705, as president of Herlufsholm School. He was also active in the management of Ordenskapitlet, first as vice chancellor (1808) and then as chancellor (1825). In 1805, he was created an honorary member of the Royal Society for Ancient Nordic Manuscripts (kgl. nordiske oldskriftselskab). In 1808, he was also made an honorary member of the Royal Danish Academy of Fine Arts.

He was created a White Knight in 1803 and a Blue Knight in 1815.

== Personal life ==
Kaas married Susanna Kirstine Clauson (née Nilson, 1757–1827) on 6 June 1786. She was a daughter of High Court justice Poul Nielson (1714–61) and Maria Bendike Haagensdatter Nielsen (1725–65). She was the widow of ironworks owner Conrad Clauson, 1753–85). Kaas had one daughter, Frederikke Elisabeth Conradine Kaas (1787–1874), who married Carl Severin Christian Herman Løvenskiold. Kaas died in Copenhagen on 11 January 1827. He is buried at Holmen Cemetery. Kaas adopted his wife's children by her first husband, who adopted the name Clauson-Kaas. The family lived at Amaliegade 16 in Copenhagen from 1802. The Kaas family's coat of arms is still seen on the keystone above the gate.
