= Carl Valentin Falsen =

Norwegian civil servant (1787–1852)

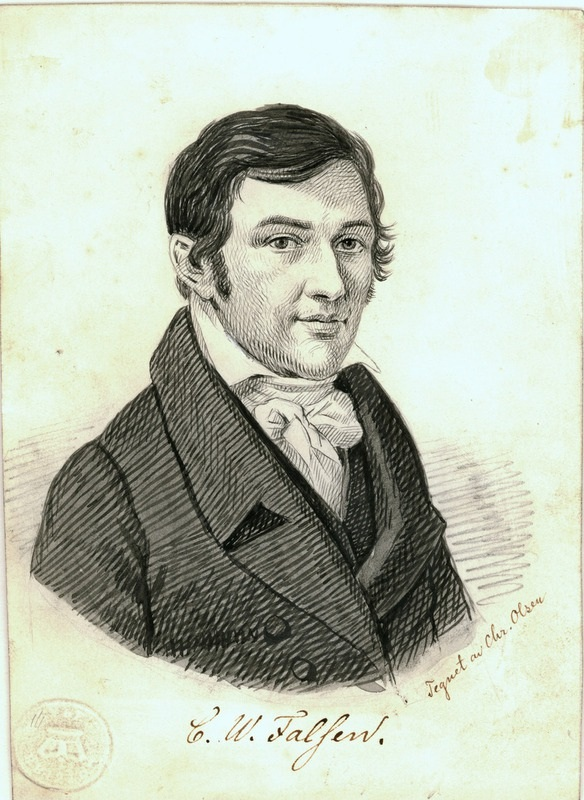

Diocesan Governor of Christianssand stiftamt
- In office 1846–1852

Personal details
- Born: 27 May 1787 Christiania, Norway
- Died: 14 April 1852 (aged 64) Christianssand, Norway
- Citizenship: Norway
- Parents: Enevold De Falsen (father); Anna Henrike Petronelle Mathiesen (mother)
- Relatives: Christian Magnus Falsen
- Education: Cand.jur. (1806)
- Alma mater: University of Copenhagen
- Profession: Politician

Carl Valentin Falsen (27 May 1787 – 14 April 1852) was a Norwegian civil servant, a county governor, and member of the Storting.

== Biography ==
Falsen was born in Christiania, Norway. He was the son of Norwegian Chief Justice Enevold De Falsen (1755–1808) and Anna Henrike Petronelle Mathiesen (1762–1825). He was the brother of Christian Magnus Falsen. Both his father and grandfather were senior justice officials. He was trained in the law and took his examination as a Candidate of Law (cand. Jur.) at the University of Copenhagen in 1806.

Falsen was the town clerk for Trondheim starting in 1809. He was hired as the town bailiff for Trondheim from 1821 until 1826. In 1826, he served as the magistrate judge for Eiker, Sigdal, and Modum. In 1839, he was appointed county governor for Bratsberg county (now called Telemark). He served in that job until 1846 when he was transferred to a new job. From 1846 until 1852, he served as the county governor of Christianssand stiftamt as well as the county governor of Lister og Mandals amt (one of the subordinate counties).

Falsen was elected to the Norwegian Parliament in 1818 and 1821 as a representative from Trondheim, in 1830-1838 from Buskerud from 1842 and 1845 representing Bratsberg and 1848-1850 as representative from Kristiansand. He served as president of the Storting (Stortingspresidenter) during 1833, 1845, and 1848.

Carl Falsen was honored as a knight of the Order of the Polar Star in 1822. He was made a commander in the Order of St. Olav in 1847.

Government offices
Preceded by Frederik Wilhelm Wedel Jarlsberg	County Governor of Bratsberg amt 1839–1846	Succeeded by Hans J. C. Aall
Preceded by Niels Arntzen Sem	Diocesan Governor of Christianssand stiftamt 1846–1852	Succeeded by Mathias Bille Kjørboe
Preceded by Niels Arntzen Sem	County Governor of Lister og Mandals amt 1846–1852	Succeeded by Mathias Bille Kjørboe
