= Frederik Moltke =

Danish politician

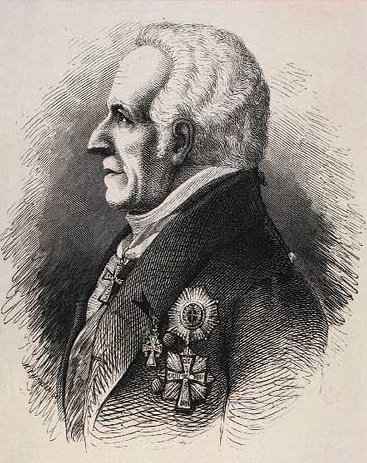

Prime Minister of Denmark
- In office 1810–1814
- Monarch: Frederick VI of Denmark
- Preceded by: C.G. von Bernstorff
- Succeeded by: Frederik Julius Kaas

Personal details
- Born: 18 January 1754 Odense, Denmark
- Died: 4 July 1836 (aged 82) Vallø Castle, Denmark
- Citizenship: Denmark-Norway then Denmark
- Profession: Politician

Frederik Moltke (1754–1836) was a Danish politician and Prime Minister of Denmark. He also served as the County Governor of several counties and dioceses in the Kingdom of Norway and the Kingdom of Denmark during his career.

He was appointed County Governor of Bratsberg amt in 1781 (in Norway), and then in 1788, he was appointed as the Diocesan Governor of Christianssand stiftamt (and served simultaneously as the County Governor of Nedenæs amt). In 1790, Moltke became the Diocesan Governor of Christiania stiftamt (and served simultaneously as the County Governor of Akershus amt).

In 1785, he found it necessary, due to the widespread dissatisfaction among the common people in Bratsberg county, to request military assistance in the event of possible unrest. In 1787 he was elected together with a lawyer named Hagerup to investigate the common peoples' complaints about the officials. Then in 1792 he was appointed to the commission that was to investigate and adjudicate the case relating to Christian Jensen Lofthuus rebellion.

In 1795, Moltke returned to Denmark, where he became a knight of the Order of the Elephant and in 1810 Prime Minister of Denmark. In 1814 he was deposed by the King, reportedly because he had expressed his sympathy for the Norwegians too strongly. He was later pardoned and appointed to be the Diocesan Governor of Aalborg stiftamt in 1816. He retired in 1824.

Government offices
Preceded by Frederik Georg Adeler	County Governor of Bratsberg amt 1781–1788	Succeeded by Jonas Ramus Petersen
Preceded by Frederik Georg Adeler	Diocesan Governor of Christianssand stiftamt 1788–1789	Succeeded by Hans Christoph Diderik Victor von Levetzow
Preceded by Frederik Georg Adeler	County Governor of Nedenæs amt 1788–1789	Succeeded by Hans Christoph Diderik Victor von Levetzow
Preceded by Jørgen Erik Skeel	Diocesan Governor of Christiania stiftamt 1789–1795	Succeeded by Frederik Julius Kaas
Preceded by Jørgen Erik Skeel	County Governor of Akershus amt 1789–1795	Succeeded by Frederik Julius Kaas
Preceded by Christian Günther von Bernstorff	Prime Minister of Denmark; 1810–1814	Succeeded by Frederik Julius Kaas
Preceded by Ditlev von Pentz	Diocesan Governor of Aalborg stiftamt 1816–1824	Succeeded by Ehrenreich Kristoffer Ludvig Moltke
