= Sæbyholm =

Manor house in Lolland Municipality, Denmark

- Sæbyholm
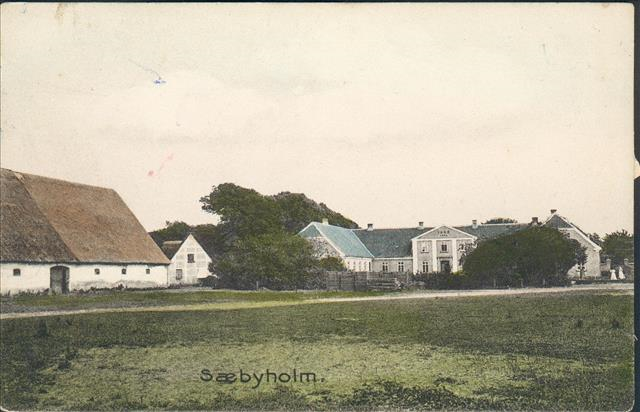
- Interactive map of the Sæbyholm area
- Alternative names: Sæbygård

General information
- Location: Lolland, Lolland Municipality, Denmark
- Coordinates: 54°50′N 11°11′E

Sæbyholm was a manor house located close to Nakskov on the island of Lolland in southeastern Denmark. The estate was acquired by Christian Heinrich August Hardenberg-Reventlow of Krenkerup in 1801 and has been owned by his descendants since then. The three-winged main building and the home farm were listed on the Danish registry of protected buildings and places in 1960. The buildings were delisted in 2012 and demolished in 2013.

== History ==
=== Early history ===
The estate was originally known as Sæbygård. In 1355, Ludvig Albertsen Eberstein granted it to Halsted Priory. Circa 1400, it was ceded to the Crown.

=== Papenheim and Ruud families ===
In 1565, Frederick II gave Sæbygaard to Burchard von Papenheim who had until then been the lensmand of the estate. After Papenheim's death in 1590, it was passed to his son-in-law Eiler Rud. He was already the owner of Utterslevgård. AfterRud's death in 1618, Sæbygård and Utterslevgård was passed to his only child, Borkvard Rud, He constructed new buildings on the Sæbygård estate, drained the land and constructed dykes to protect it from flooding. He died as the last male member of the family in 1647. His widow, Helvig Jakobsdatter Rosenkrantz. kept the estate until 1660 when it was ceded to Rud's cousin, Lene Rud.

=== Winterfeldt family, 1671–1801 ===
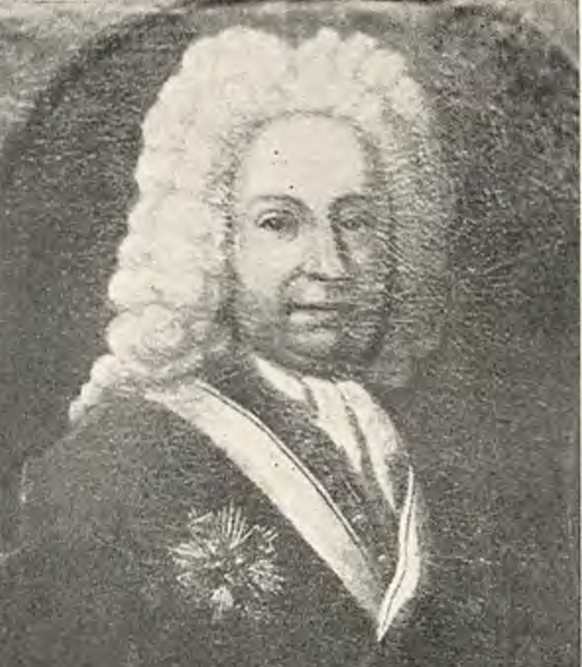
Helmuth Otto von Winterfeldt.

After Lene Rud's death in1671, her heirs sold the estate to Helmuth Otto von Winterfeldt. He served as lord chamberlain from 1670 to 1679. In 1671, he created the Barony of Vintersborg from the estates Sæbygård and Utterslevgaard. He changed the name of Sæbygård to Sæbyholm and expanded the estate significantly through the acquisition of more land.

=== Hardenberg-Reventlow family, 1801–present ===
Frederik Christian Holck-Winterfeldt chose to dissolve the barony in 1801 and then ceded Sæbyholm to count Christian Heinrich August Hardenberg-Reventlow in exchange for Fjellebro and Skovgaard. Christian Heinrich August Hardenberg-Reventlow managed Sæbyholm as a farm under Krenkerup, the centre of the countship he had created in 1815. A new main building was constructed for Ida Augusta Hardenberg-Reventlow in 1856.

The Countship ofHardenberg-Reventlow was dissolved in 1925 as a result of the lensafløsningsloven of 1919. Henrik Ludwig Erdmann Georg Haugwitz-Hardenberg-Reventlow parted with 230 hectares of land from the Sæbyholms estate in connection with the transaction.

The buildings were delisted in 2012. They were demolished in 2013.

== List of owners ==
- (–1355) Ludvig Albertsen Eberstein
- (1355–) Halsted Kloster
- (–1565) The Crown
- (1565–1590) Burchard von Papenheim
- (1590) Margrethe Burchardsdatter Rud née von Papenheim
- (1590–1618) Eiler Rud
- (1618–1647) Borkvard Rud
- (1647–1660) Helvig Jakobsdatter Rud née Rosenkrantz
- (1660–1671) Lene Grubbe née Rud
- (1671–1694) Helmuth Otto von Winterfeldt
- (1694–1699) Gustav von Winterfeldt
- (1699–1724) Juliane Margrethe von Eickstedt née von Winterfeldt
- (1724–1728) Christopher von Eickstedt née von Winterfeldt
- (1728–1741) Juliane Margrethe von Eickstedt née von Winterfeldt
- (1741–1757) Carl Wilhelm Gjedde
- (1757–1769) Sophie Gjedde née von Winterfeldt
- (1769–1772) Flemming Holck-Winterfeldt
- (1772–1776) Gustav Frederik Holck-Winterfeld
- (1776–1801) Frederik Christian Holck-Winterfeldt
- (1801–1840) Christian Heinrich August Hardenberg-Reventlow
- (1840–1867) Ida Augusta Hardenberg-Reventlow, married 1) Holck 2) Gersdorff and 3) D'Almaforte
- (1867–1885) Carl Ludvig August Rudolph Holck-Hardenberg-Reventlow
- (1885–1903) Lucie Howitz née Schönaich-Carolath
- (1903–1921) Heinrich Bernhard Carl Paul Georg Curt Haugwitz-Hardenberg-Reventlow
- (1921–1970) Henrik Ludwig Erdmann Georg Haugwitz-Hardenberg-Reventlow
- (1970–present) Rupert Gorm Reventlow-Grinling
