= Hjalmar Inge Sunde =

Norwegian military officer

Lieutenant general Hjalmar Inge Sunde

Governor of Aust-Agder
- In office 1995–2007

Personal details
- Born: 29 December 1937 (age 88) Sokndal Municipality, Norway
- Citizenship: Norway
- Profession: Military officer

Hjalmar Inge Sunde (born 29 December 1937) is a Norwegian military officer and former county governor.

He finished his secondary education at the Stavanger Handelsgymnasium school in 1956, and graduated from the Norwegian Military Academy and became a lieutenant in 1960. After taking post-secondary education classes in Norway, Kansas, and Pennsylvania, he reached the rank of lieutenant general in 1987, and was the Commander Allied Forces South Norway (COMSONOR) until 1991. He also represented Norway in the NATO Military Committee. He was the president of the interest group Norges Forsvarsforening from 1995 to 2001.

He was County Governor of Aust-Agder from 1995 until his retirement on 31 December 2007. After his retirement, there was some discussion on combining the position with the County Governor of Vest-Agder and calling it the County Governor of Agder. The Storting debated this for some time before appointing Øystein Djupedal to the position as soon as he finished his Parliamentary term. Svein Årli was the acting governor until Djupedal took office.

Sunde has been decorated with the National Service Medal with three stars, Defence Service Medal with 2 stars, the Defence Service Medal with Laurel Branch and appointed a Commander of the Royal Norwegian Order of St. Olav.

Government offices
Preceded by Signe Marie Stray Ryssdal	County Governor of Aust-Agder; 1995–2007	Succeeded by Svein Åril (acting for Øystein Djupedal)
