= Mathias Bille Kjørboe =

Norwegian lawyer and politician (1794–1859)

Diocesan Governor of Christianssand stiftamt
- In office 1852–1859
- Preceded by: Carl Valentin Falsen
- Succeeded by: Niels Petersen Vogt

Personal details
- Born: 28 April 1794 Moss, Norway
- Died: 29 October 1859 (aged 65) Christianssand, Norway
- Citizenship: Norway
- Education: Cand.jur. (1815)
- Profession: Lawyer

Mathias Bille Kjørboe (1794–1859) was a Norwegian lawyer and politician. He served as a member of the Storting for 14 years. He also served as the County Governor of Lister og Mandal county from 1852 until his death in 1859.

Kjørboe was the son of a lawyer. He was a student from the Christianssand Cathedral School in 1810 and received his cand.jur. degree in 1815 in Copenhagen. After that he worked in the judicial office of his father in Østre Råbygdelaget in Nedenæs county. In 1817 he became a court prosecutor in Kristiansand. From 1821 until 1823 he was the acting judge in Vestre Råbygdelaget in Nedenæs county. From 1829 until 1843, he was an assessor in the court in Kristiansand. In 1843 he got the job as a judge in Lyngdal. In 1852, he was appointed the Diocesan Governor of Christianssand stiftamt as well as the County Governor of Lister of Mandals amt (a subordinate county).

Kjørboe was also a representative from Kristiansand in the Storting from 1827 until 1841.

Government offices
Preceded by Carl Valentin Falsen	Diocesan Governor of Christianssand stiftamt 1852–1859	Succeeded by Niels Petersen Vogt
Preceded by Carl Valentin Falsen	County Governor of Lister og Mandals amt 1852–1859	Succeeded by Niels Petersen Vogt
