= Nicolai Emanuel de Thygeson =

Danish-Norwegian landowner and government official

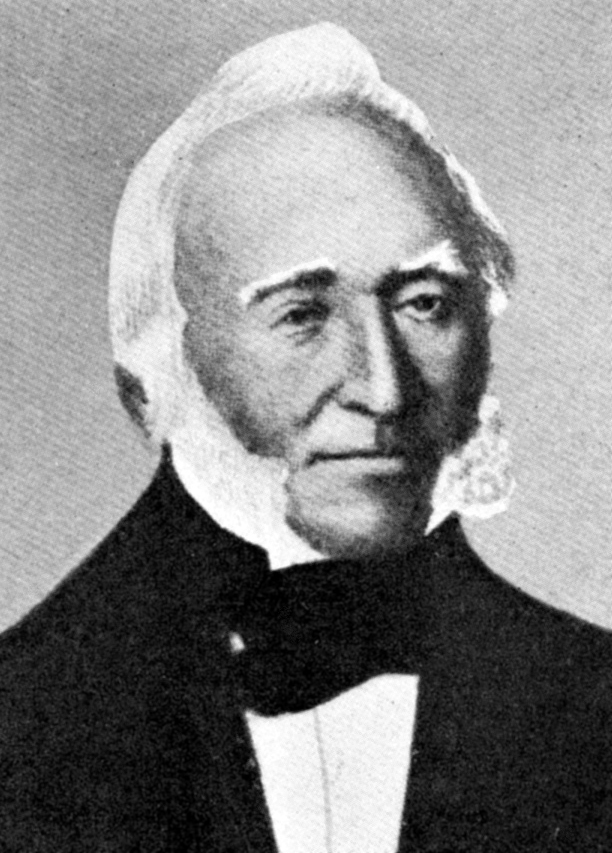

Diocesan Governor of Christianssand stiftamt
- In office 1804–1810

Diocesan Governor of Christiania stiftamt
- In office 1812–1813

Personal details
- Born: 19 April 1772 Denmark
- Died: 16 May 1860 (aged 88) Zurich, Switzerland
- Citizenship: Denmark-Norway
- Spouse: Lovise Pløen
- Children: Thyge de Thygeson
- Parents: Thyge Jesper de Thygeson (father); Sophie Charlotte de Cederfeld (mother)
- Education: Cand.jur. (1797)
- Alma mater: University of Copenhagen
- Profession: Politician

Nicolai Emanuel de Thygeson or Niels Emanuel de Thygeson (19 April 1772 – 16 May 1860) was a Danish-Norwegian landowner and government official. The Thygeson family was originally a Danish noble family. Nevertheless, Thygeson was one of those who worked purposefully for Norway's secession from Denmark and the establishment of a Norwegian constitution.

== Career ==
Thygeson was the County Governor of Hedemarkens amt from 1802 to 1804. In 1804, he was promoted and named the Diocesan Governor of Christianssand stiftamt. He held that job until 1810. He then returned to Denmark to run his estate there. In 1812, he was appointed to be the Diocesan Governor of Christiania stiftamt.

Thygeson made a name for himself when, in the dramatic days of September 1807, he (as the Governor) ordered a British warship to be protected with cannons at Christiansholm Fortress. This was the first (and only) time the fortress had opened fire on an enemy.

In Christianssand, he is honored by the fact that the "old" Lund Bridge that crosses the river Otra and connects Kvadraturen with Lund named in "Thygeson's Memory" (Norwegian: Thygesons minne).

== Personal life ==
In 1776, his father was knighted and he became part of the Danish nobility. He owned Bygholm Manor and held Stamhuset Mattrup at Horsens, Denmark. In Norway he was the owner of the main farm at Nordre Skøyen in Østre Aker and Brynseng.

Thygeson was a key name in Det Dramatiske Selskab in Christianssand together with Henrik Arnold Thaulow and Nicolai Wergeland, and he was a close friend of the sibling couple Henrik Wergeland and Camilla Collett.

Government offices
Preceded by Andreas Høyer	County Governor of Hedemarkens amt 1802–1804	Succeeded by Claus Bendeke
Preceded by Otto Joachim Moltke	Diocesan Governor of Christianssand stiftamt 1804–1810	Succeeded by Hans Vilhelm Cederfeld de Simonsen
Preceded by Otto Joachim Moltke	County Governor of Nedenæs amt 1804–1810	Succeeded by Hans Vilhelm Cederfeld de Simonsen
Preceded by Marcus Gjøe Rosenkrantz	Diocesan Governor of Christiania stiftamt 1812–1813	Succeeded by Poul Christian Holst
