= Hans Christoph Diderik Victor von Levetzow =

Danish noble and government official

Governor of Nedenæs amt
- In office 1789–1800

County Governors of Husum amt
- In office 1800–1829

Personal details
- Born: 9 September 1754 Schweisel, Mecklenburg, Holy Roman Empire
- Died: 28 October 1829 (aged 75) Husum, Denmark-Norway
- Citizenship: Denmark-Norway
- Profession: Government official

Hans Christoph Diderik Victor von Levetzow (1754-1829) was a Danish noble and government official. He served as the Diocesan Governor in Iceland from 1785 until 1789. He was then transferred to Norway where he served as the Diocesand Governor of Christianssand stiftamt (and simultaneously as the County Governor of Nedenæs amt from 1789 until 1800. He was then sent to be the County Governor of Husum and Bredstedt counties in Denmark from 1800 until 1826. From 1826 until his death in 1829, he was the administrator of the County of Rantzau in Holstein.

Government offices
Preceded by Frederik Moltke	County Governor of Nedenæs amt 1789–1800	Succeeded by Otto Joachim Moltke
Preceded by Johann Friedrich von Schönfeldt	County Governor of Husum and Bredstedt amt 1800–1826	Succeeded by Godske Hans Ernst von Krogh
