= Frederik Christian von Møsting =

Danish government official

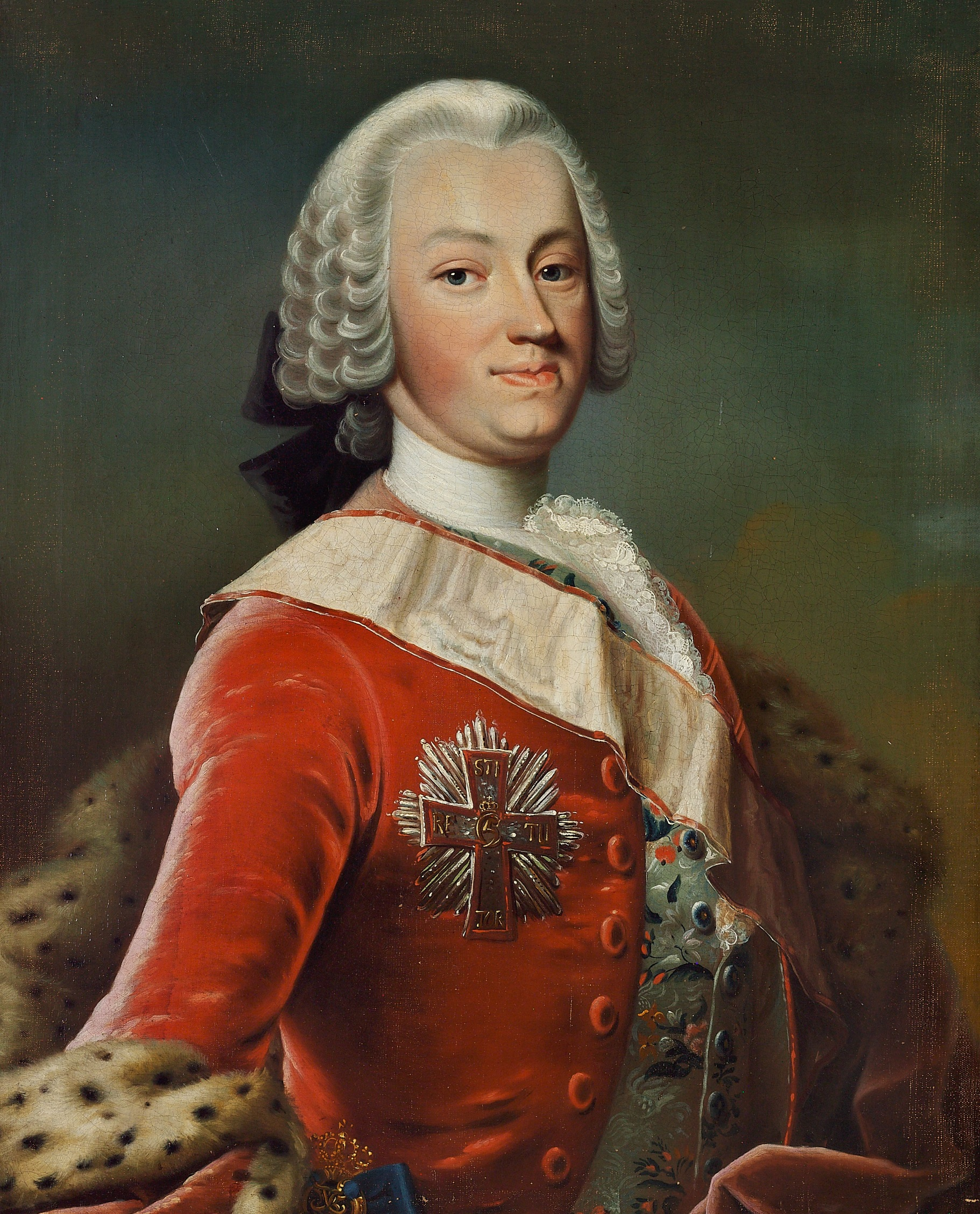
Frederik Christian von Møsting

Frederik Christian von Møsting (15 December 1717 – 17 February 1773) was a Danish government official. He served as county governor of Møn. He was the son of Alexander Frederik Møsting and father of later government minister Johan Sigismund von Møsting.

== Early life ==
Møsting was born on 15 December 1717 to Alexander Frederik Møsting and Christine Elisabeth von Knulh. His mother was first time married to Knud Juel.

== Career ==
In 1740, Møsting became kammerjunker for the Crown Prince. On 6 September 1746, he was appointed as chamberlain (kammerherre). On 28 February 1747, he was appointed as county governor of Møn County. In 1749, he bought Marienlyst Manor from Adam Gottlob Moltke for 6,000 Danish rigsdaler. On 31 March 1759, he was created a Knight in the Order of the Dannebrog. In 1766, he was awarded the title of geheimeråd.

== Personal life ==
He was married to ElisabethCathr. Schack (1713–1782) on 12 May 1747. She was the daughter of army major Otto Schack til Bramslykke and Kjærstrup and Hustru Elisabeth von Raben. She gave birth to two children. The son Johan Sigismund von Møsting would later become prime minister of Denmark. The daughter Juliane Marie von Møsting (1754 - 1821) was married to Count Frederik Knuth-Knuthenborg.

His sister Catharina Maria von Schulin was married to foreign minister Johan Sigismund Schulin. His half brothers included Carl Juel.

Frederik Christian von Møsting died on 17 February 1773 in Stege.

Civic offices
Preceded by Christopher Sigismund von Galkowsky	County Governor of Copenhagen County; 1747–1773	Succeeded by IChristopher Georg Wallmoden
