= Niels Cornelius Bonnevie =

Norwegian Lawyer and Politician

Governor of Nedenæs amt
- In office 1868–1895

Personal details
- Born: 3 March 1827 Christiania, Norway
- Died: 10 August 1899 (aged 72) Kristiania, Norway
- Citizenship: Norway
- Parent: Honoratus Bonnevie (father)
- Relatives: Jacob Aall Bonnevie (brother)

Niels Cornelius Bonnevie (1827–1895) was a Norwegian lawyer and civil servant. He served as the County Governor of Nedenæs county from 1868 until 1895.

He graduated with a degree in law in 1849 and then worked in the Ministry of the Interior, where he rose through the ranks. He became the County Governor of Nedenes amt in 1868 and he held that job until his death in 1895.

He became a knight of the Order of St. Olav in 1865 and was promoted to commander of the Order of St. Olav in 1891.

His parents were Honoratus Bonnevie (Mayor of Trondheim and Member of the Storting) and Sofia Augusta Baumann. He was the brother of politician Jacob Aall Bonnevie.

Government offices
Preceded by Niels Wisløff Rogstad	County Governor of Nedenæs amt 1868–1895	Succeeded by Nikolai Prebensen
