= Niels Wisløff Rogstad =

Norwegian civil servant

Governor of Nedenæs amt
- In office 1863–1868

Personal details
- Born: 14 August 1814 Christianssand, Norway
- Died: 11 September 1880 (aged 66) Norway
- Citizenship: Norway
- Profession: Politician

Niels Wisløff Rogstad (14 August 1814 – 11 September 1880) was a Norwegian civil servant and lawyer. He served as the County Governor of Nedenæs county from 1863 until 1868. After his time as governor, he was appointed the bailiff of Hedmark from 1868 until 1880.

Government offices
Preceded by Henrik Laurentius Helliesen	County Governor of Nedenæs amt 1863–1868	Succeeded by Niels Cornelius Bonnevie
