= Bygholm Manor =

Manor house in Horsens Municipality, Denmark

Bygholm
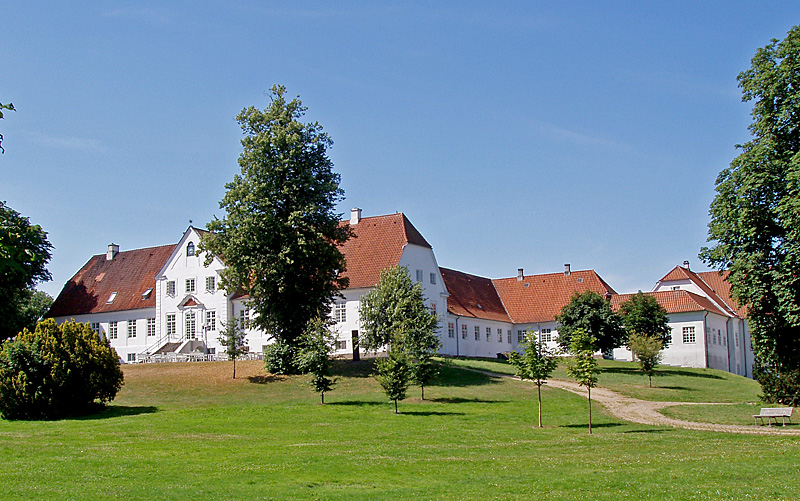
- Bygholm viewed from the park

- Location within Denmark

General information
- Architectural style: Baroque
- Location: Horsens Municipality, Denmark
- Coordinates: 55°51′53″N 09°49′32″E
- Completed: 1775

Bygholm Castle is a former royal castle and manor house located just south of Horsens, Denmark. It traces its history back to 1313 but the current Baroque buildings date from 1775. Owned by Horsens Municipality, the main building is now run as a hotel while the associated land is a public park and used as fair grounds.

== History ==
Bygholm Castle was founded in 1313 upon orders from King Eric VI Menved following a revolt among peasants in Jutland.

The castle was run by a vassal (lensmand). The most famous of these to reside at Bygholm was Erik Lange, who belonged to Tycho Brahe's social circle but experienced economic ruin, experimented with alchemy and left Bygholm in a state of neglect. As a result, and possibly after a fire in the beginning of the 17th century, later vassals preferred to reside at nearby Stjernholm and the name of the fee was changed accordingly.

In 1661, Frederick III ceded the estate to Peder von Ufelen from Hamburg. In 1670 he sold it to Joachim Werner Bülow, who rebuilt Bygholm and returned it to its former state of a manor.

Horsens Municipality acquired the estate in 1918.

== Architecture ==
The current main building was built in 1775 to a symmetrical Baroque design by Andreas Møller. It consists of a one-storey main wing with a three-bay central projection, flanked by two lower L-shaped lateral wings. It was listed by the Danish Heritage Agency in 1984.

The farm buildings are of somewhat younger origins and are not listed.

== Bygholm today ==
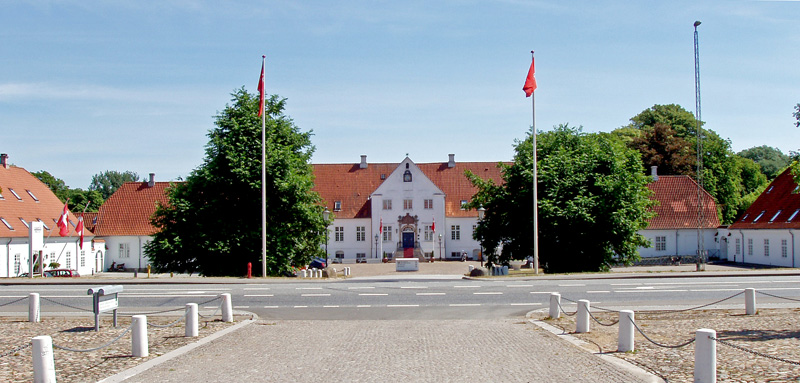
The main wing

The main building is now run as a hotel (Scandic Bygholm Park). The park is open to the public and used for fairs and other events.

The farm buildings contain the Bygholm Research Centre, Department of Agricultural Technologies, part of Aarhus University.

== Owners ==
- (1313–1661) The Crown
- (1661) Peder von Ufelen/Dominicus von Ufelen/Johan von Ufelen
- (1661–1670) Peder von Ufelen
- (1670–1697) Joachim Werner von Bülow
- (1697–1705) Jørgen Rantzau
- (1705–1719) Theodosius von Levetzow
- (1719–1763) Anna Margrethe Brockenhuus née von Levetzow
- (1763) Hans Frederik von Levetzau
- (1763–1766) Sophie von Levetzau née von Eyndten
- (1766–1809) Lars de Thygeson
- (1809–1830) Niels Emanuel de Thygeson
- (1830–1835) The Crown
- (1835–1889) August Theodor Schütte
- (1889–1915) Ludvig Theodor Schütte
- (1915–1918) Ludvig Theodor Schüttes' estate
- (1918–) Horsens Municipality
