= Henrik Adeler =

Norwegian civil servant and politician (1660–1718)

Henrik Nielsen Adeler

Diocesan Governor of Christianssand stiftamt
- In office 1711–1718

Personal details
- Born: 1660 Kragerø, Norway
- Died: 8 February 1718 (aged 57–58) Skien, Norway
- Citizenship: Denmark-Norway
- Parent: Niels Sørensen Adeler (father)
- Relatives: Cort Adeler (uncle)
- Profession: Government official

Henrik Adeler (1660–1718) was a Norwegian civil servant and politician. He served as the County Governor in Bratsberg amt from 1692 until 1710. Then he served as the Diocesan Governor of Christianssand stiftamt from 1711 until his death in 1718. During his time in Christianssand, he also served as County Governor of one of the subordinate counties: Nedenæs amt. During his time as diocesan governor in Christiansand, he came into bitter conflict with the Bishop of Christianssand, Jens Bircherod. The bishop sent a complaint against him to the king in 1712. The complaint led to a sharp reprimand for both, but especially towards Adeler, directly from the king.

He was the son of County Governor Niels Sørensen Adeler and nephew of Admiral Cort Adeler.

Government offices
Preceded by Niels Sørensen Adeler	County Governor of Bratsberg amt 1692–1710	Succeeded by Jacob Lindberg
Preceded by Christian Frederik Powisch	Diocesan Governor of Christianssand stiftamt 1711–1718	Succeeded by Johan Sigismund Hassius Lillienpalm
Preceded by Christian Frederik Powisch	County Governor of Nedenæs amt 1711–1718	Succeeded by Johan Sigismund Hassius Lillienpalm
