= Frederik Georg Adeler =

Danish-Norwegian county official and landowner (1736–1810)

Governor of Christianssand stiftamt
- In office 1781–1788

Personal details
- Born: 25 August 1736 Gundetved, Sjælland, Denmark
- Died: 1 November 1810 (aged 74) Gjerpen, Norway
- Citizenship: Denmark-Norway
- Parent: Frederik Adeler (father)
- Relatives: Frederik Adeler d.y.
- Profession: Government official

Frederik Georg Adeler (1736-1810) was a Danish-Norwegian county official and landowner. He was the son of Frederik Adeler, as well as great-grandchild of Admiral Cort Adeler. Frederik Georg Adeler inherited and lived on the large estate at the Gimsøy Abbey with a manor house and headquarters at Klosterøya in Skien. He served as the County Governor and Diocesan Governor in various counties from 1764 until 1788.

Adeler served in the military from 1755 until 1764, reaching the rank of Major. After leaving the military, he was appointed county governor of Bratsberg on 30 July 1764, when he was 28 years old. On 20 February 1771, he was transferred against his will to be the county governor of Lister og Mandal county, because "his right of first refusal for timber, as owner of Gimsø, came into conflict with his office" in Bratsberg. Basically, the king felt like he had a conflict of interest in his financial interests in the county of which he was in charge. In 1773, after 2 years away, he requested a transfer back to Bratsberg as county governor on the condition that his timber trade was taken care of by the county governor in Buskerud, the neighboring county. The king granted his request.

In November 1777, shortly after the great fire in Skien, he gained a lot of popularity in the county because of his great charity, helping the victims of the fire. In 1781, he was again moved, but now as promotion to diocesan governor over all of the diocese. The investigations in connection with the Lofthus rebellion had brought to light a number of irregularities in his relationship, namely the illegal and unreasonable free rides he undertook on his many journeys between Kristiansand and Gimsøy in purely private matters. He resigned in 1787 and moved home to his estate on the old Gimsøy Abbey.

== Family ==
Frederik Georg Adeler was first married to Juliane Ernestine de Cicignon (1744—1799), daughter of Ulrik Fredrik de Cicignon (1698-1772) and Nicolaina Antoinette von Brügmann (1717-1759). Due to disagreements, Adeler was separated from his wife in 1785. In 1796 he married Caroline Rudolphine Schubart (1760—1798) who was the widow of the chamberlain Jacob Løvenskiold. Adeler had only one surviving child, Anton Beatus, who was in poor health and who in 1818 married the widow Mogensine Bentzen. Frederik Georg Adeler chose to bequeath his manor at the Gimsøy Abbey and the rest of the properties to his Danish nephew, Baron Frederik Adeler and his family line. Anton Beatus only received an annuity to support himself and his family.

Government offices
Preceded by Johan Frederik Brockenhuus von Løwenhielm	County Governor of Bratsberg amt 1764–1771	Succeeded by Peter Holm
Preceded by Magnus Theiste	County Governor of Lister og Mandals amt 1771–1773	Succeeded by Peter Holm
Preceded by Peter Holm	County Governor of Bratsberg amt 1773–1781	Succeeded by Frederik Moltke
Preceded by Hans Hagerup Gyldenpalm	Diocesan Governor of Christianssand stiftamt 1781–1788	Succeeded by Frederik Moltke
