= Knud Juel =

Danish landowner and county governor of Copenhagen

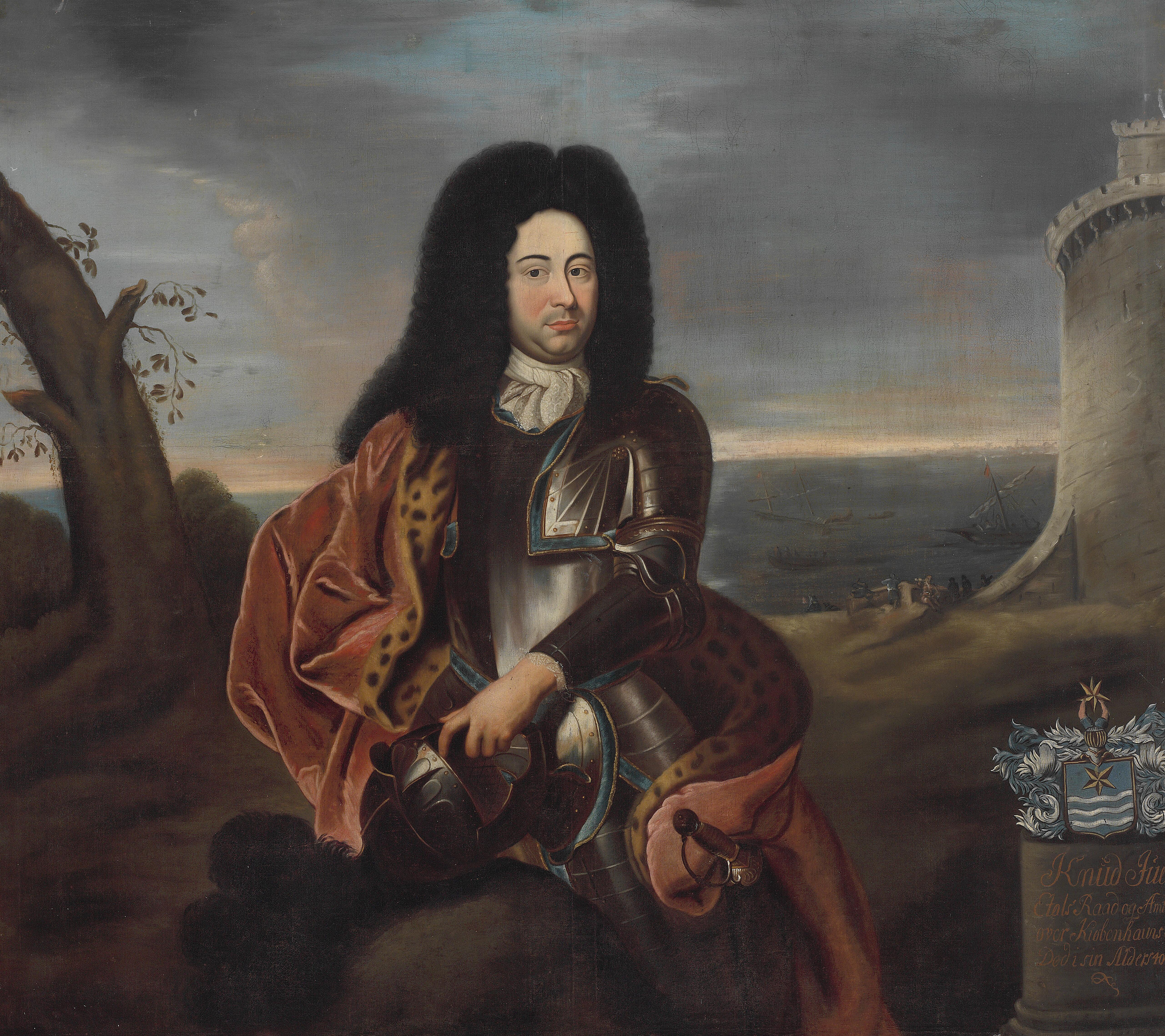
Knud Juel

Knud Juel (30 September 1665 – 10 January 1709) was a Danish landowner and county governor of Copenhagen. He was the son of admiral Niels Juel and the father of Carl Juel.

== Early life and education ==
Juel was born on 30 September 1665, the son of admiral Niels Juel and Margrethe Ulfeldt.

== Career ==
In 1688, Juel was appointed as kammerjunker. In 1699, he was appointed as county governor of Copenhagen County. In 1700, during the Swedish attack on Copenhagen, he was in charge of the coastal defence in Copenhagen County. He managed to stop the Swedish fleet from landing at Gyldenlund and Skovshoved. In 1705, he became patron of Roskilde Convent. In 1699, Juel was awarded the title of etatsråd.

== Property ==
After his father's death, Juel became the owner of Valdemar's Castle in Råsinge. He increased the size of the estate, both by buying more farms and reclaiming land along the coast.

== Personal life and legacy ==
Juel was married to Christine Elisabeth Knuth on 18 February 1695. She was the daughter of Joachim Frederik Knuth til Leizen and Christine v. Wancken.

Juel died in Copenhagen just 43 years old on 10 January 1709. He was buried in the Juel family's burial chapel in Holmen Church in Copenhagen. Shortly prior to his death, he had converted Valdemar's Castle into an entailed property, a co-called stamhus.

Juel's widow was married to oberst Alexander Frederik Møsting (1680–1737) in 1714. This resulted in a legal dispute, since her children's guardian feared that her marriage would influence their interests.

His eldest son Niels Juel succeeded him to Stamhuset Yaasinge (Valdemar's Slot). The second-eldest son Carl Juel was a landowner, prefect (stiftamtmand), diplomat and overhofmester (court title). The third-eldest son Jens (1707–1774) owned Lundsgaard. The eldest daughter Vibeke Knudsdatter Juel was married to Hans von Løwenhielm, Til Vejrupgaard. The two last sons (Knud and Christian Frederik) and four remaining daughters (Sophie Hedvig, Kirstine, Louise and Margrethe) did not marry. Their mother had two more sons by her second husband, Catharina Maria von Schulin (married to foreign minister Johan Sigismund Schulin) and Frederik Christian von Møsting, til Marienborg. The latter served as county governor of Møn.

Civic offices
Preceded by Adam Levin Knuth	County Governor of Copenhagen County; 1699–1709	Succeeded by Iver Rosenkrantz
