= Hans Thomas Knudtzon =

Norwegian lawyer and civil servant

Governor of Aust-Agder
- In office 1917–1921

Personal details
- Born: 18 December 1857 Trondheim, Norway
- Died: 21 August 1921 (aged 63) Arendal, Norway
- Citizenship: Norway
- Profession: Politician

Hans Thomas Knudtzon (18 December 1857 – 21 August 1921) was a Norwegian lawyer and civil servant. He served as the County Governor of Aust-Agder county from 1917 until his death in 1921.

He graduated with a degree in law in 1880. From 1881, he worked as an attorney with the magistrate judge's office in Numedal and Sandsvær, and later for the Ministry of the Interior and at the Akershus County Office under County Governor Johan Christian Collett. He worked as a court prosecutor in Akershus county in 1889, and then worked as a prosecutor in Follo and Drøbak in 1890. In 1892, he was the police prosecutor in Aker and Follo, and he was appointed as a police inspector for the Aker police in 1893.

In 1896, he was appointed mayor of Kristiansand and took office in April 1897. He held this office of Borgermester until 1917. In 1917, he was appointed to be the County Governor of Aust-Agder, a post which he held until his death in 1921.

Government offices
Preceded by Sven Aarrestad	County Governor of Aust-Agder; 1917–1921; The title was County Governor of Nedenæs amt from 1917 to 1919.	Succeeded by Jonas Pedersen
