= Carl Juel =

Danish statesman, court official, councillor and diocesan governor

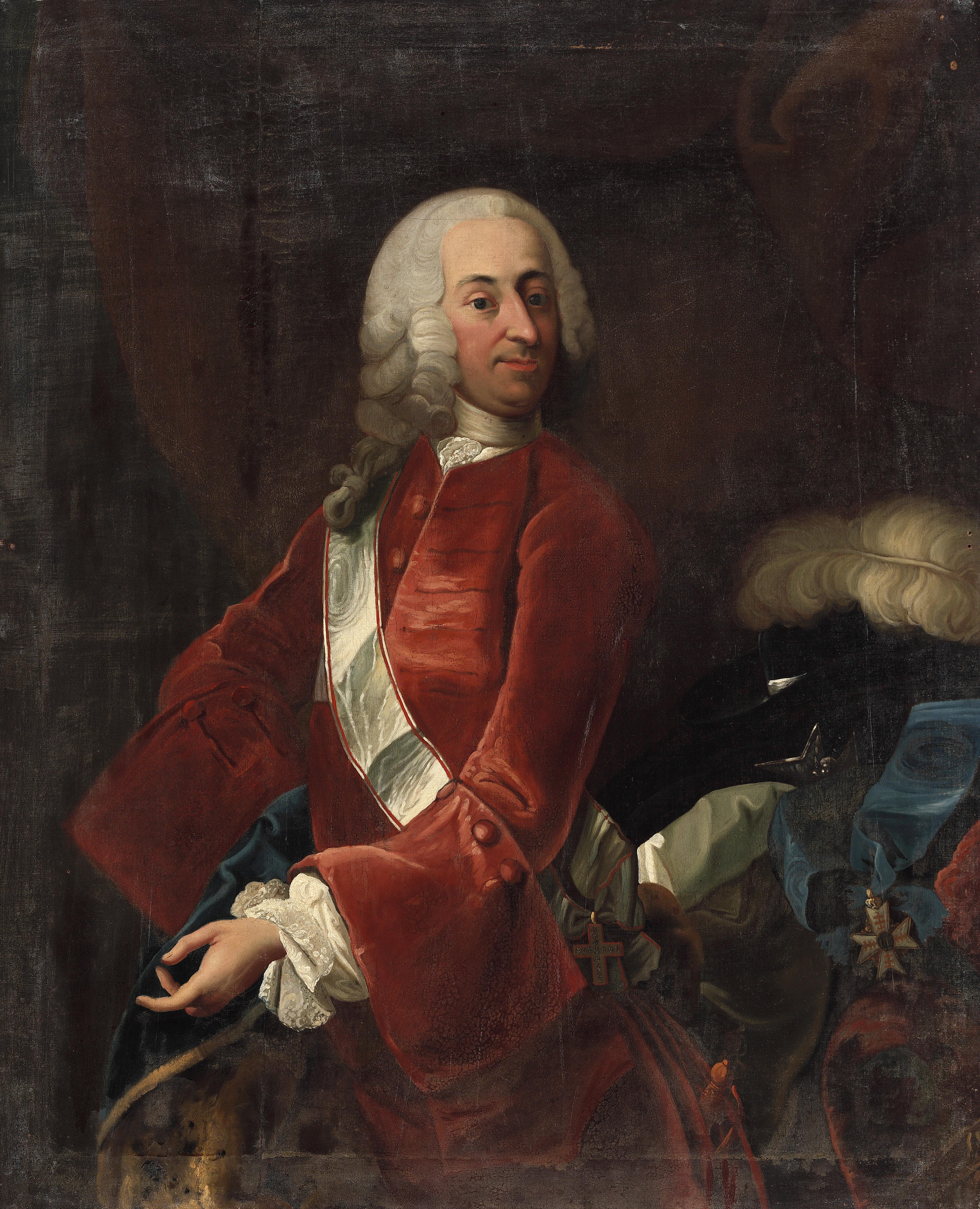

Diocesan Governor of Christianssand stiftamt
- In office 1738–1742

Diocesan Governor of Fyns stiftamt
- In office 1760–1767

Personal details
- Born: 22 June 1706 Denmark
- Died: 1 September 1767 (aged 61) Denmark
- Citizenship: Denmark-Norway
- Profession: Government official

Carl Juel (22 June 1706 – 1 September 1767), was a Danish statesman and court official, councillor, and diocesan governor.

== Early life and education ==
Carl Juel was born on 22 June 1706 in Copenhagen. He was the son of statesman and nobleman Knud Juel (1665–1709) and Christine Elisabeth Knuth (1675–1738). His paternal grandfather was the admiral Niels Juel. His older brother, Niels Juel (1696–1766), was a court official.

== Career ==
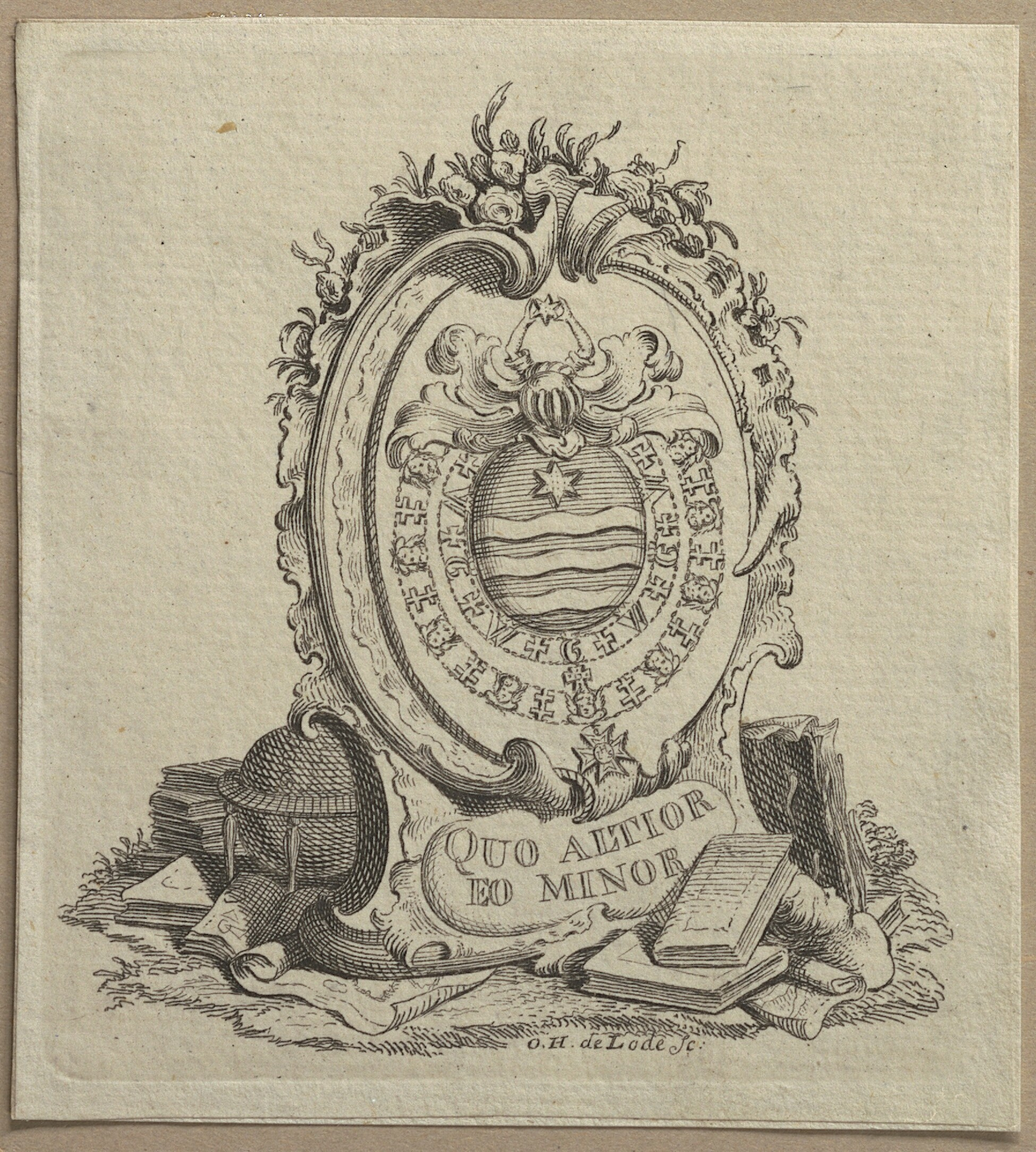
Carl Juel's coat of arms.

He served as courtier to the queen, Sophie Magdalene of Brandenburg-Kulmbach, and he married the queen's maid-of-honor Christiane Henriette Louise von Schleinitz in 1738. He was appointed as the Diocesan Governor of Christianssand stiftamt in Norway from 1738 until 1742. They then moved back to Denmark where he and his wife were powerful central figures at the Danish royal court and their careers there took place in parallel: in 1742–43 they served as chamberlain and chief lady-in-waiting to Princess Louise of Denmark, and in 1743 they were appointed to the same position for the new crown princess, Louise of Great Britain. They kept their offices to Louise after she became queen, and were appointed to the same offices to the next queen, Juliana Maria of Brunswick-Wolfenbüttel, in 1752.

In 1754, the Juel couple were ousted from the royal court, reportedly because they were considered a threat by the powerful Johann Hartwig Ernst von Bernstorff. He was then appointed to the position of County Governor of Ringsted amt. He held that post from 1754 until 1760 when he was appointed to the position of Diocesan Governor of Fyns stiftamt, a job which he held until his death in 1767.

== Property ==
In 1755, Juel purchased Rønnebæksholm. He himself rarely stayed at the estate, and instead had it administered by an estate manager. He sold the property in 1761. After his brother Niels died in 1766, he inherited Valdemar's Castle, which had been in the family since 1678.

== Personal life ==
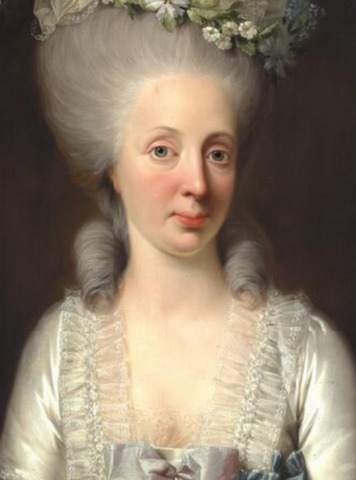
Amalie Christiane Juel, née Raben,.

Juel was married three times. He married Christiane Henriette Louise von Schleinitz on 15 August 1738. She died on 12 August 1756. On 24 March 1759, he married Anna Margrethe Juel (1741–1761). She was a daughter of Peder Juel and Birthe Cathrine von Levetzow, Juel was married for the third time on 24 March 1762, to Amalie Christiane von Raben (1736–1803). She was a daughter of Christian Frederik von Raben (1693-1773) and Berte von Plessen (1707-1786).J uel died on 1 September 1767 in at Odense Palace. He is buried at Bregninge Kirke on Tåsinge.

Amalie Christiane Raben donated a new altar set (challice and disc) to Valdemar's Church in 1769 . It was executed by the goldsmith Rasmus Møller in Odense.

Two sons and a daughter lived to adulthood and left issue. The eldest son Frederik Juel (1761-1827) was married twice, first to Magdalene Lucia Charlotte Lucie Charlotte von Rumohr (1759-1817) and secondly to Louise Theodora von Warnstedt (mée von Warnstedt, 1777-1835); widow of Hannibal Carl Wilhelm Hannibal Wedell-Wedellsborg. The younger son Knud Frederik Juel (1766-1847), a diplomat, court official and landowner, was married to Frederikke Knuth-Gyldensteen, comtesse (1779-1861). The daughter Christiane Margarethe Juel, af Taasinge (1764-1803) was married to Stie Tønsberg Schøller von Krogh, til Løjtvedgaard & Kroghsgaard (1763-1817).

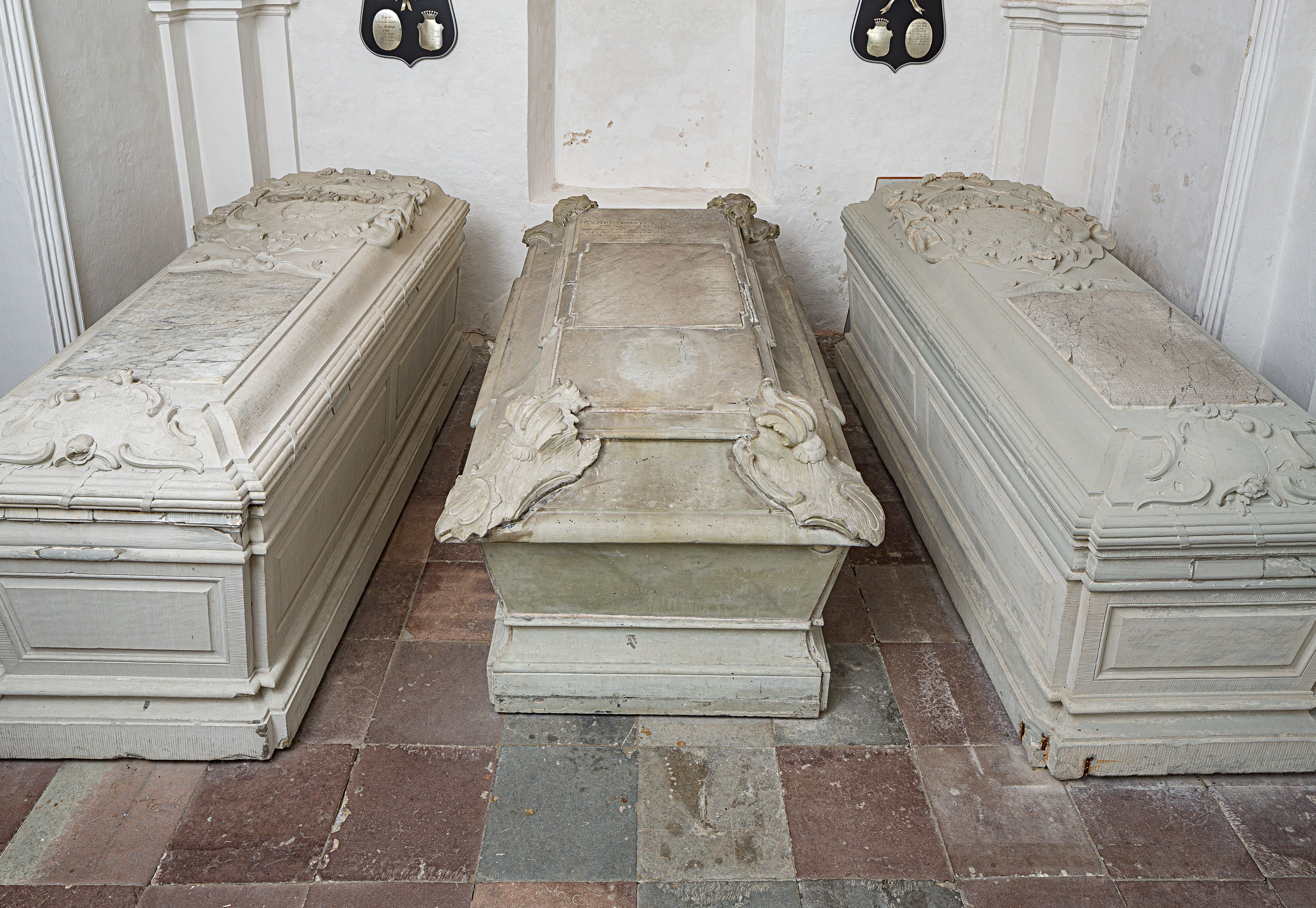
The sarcofages of Carl Juel (right) and his first wife Christiane Henriette von Schleinitz in Vregninge Church on Tåsinge. The sarcofagus to the left is that of Sophie Amalie Parsberg (1699-1788), Juel's sister-in-law (married to his brither Nile).

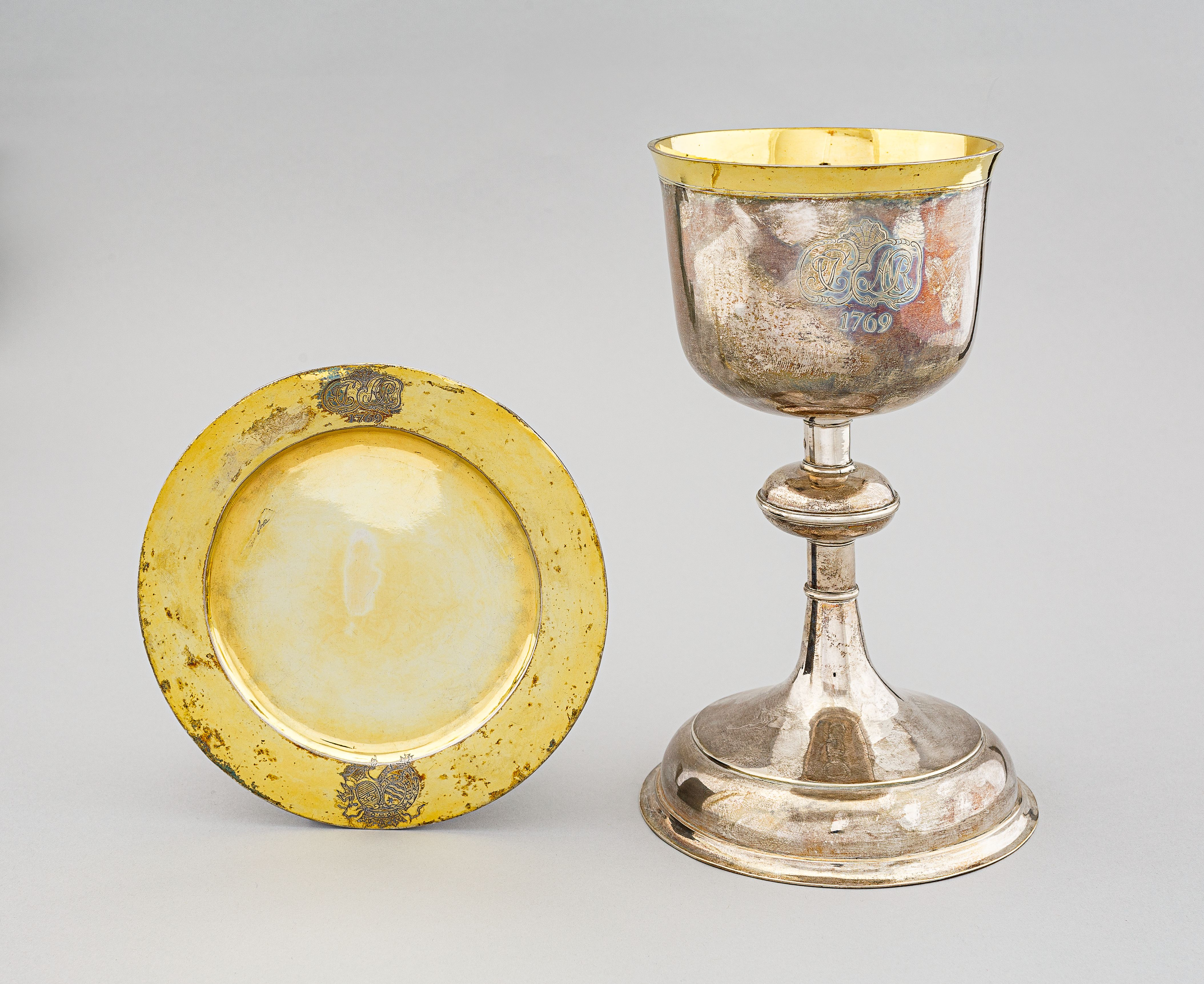
Raben's altar set in Valdemar's Church.

Government offices
Preceded by Johan Albrecht With	Diocesan Governor of Christianssand stiftamt 1738–1742	Succeeded by Heinrich von Reuss
Preceded by Johan Albrecht With	County Governor of Nedenæs amt 1738–1742	Succeeded by Heinrich von Reuss
Preceded by Heinrich von Reuss	County governor of Sorø Amt; 1754–1760	Succeeded by Frederik Danneskjold-Samsøe
Preceded by Heinrich von Reuss	County Governor of Ringsted Amt; 1754–1760	Succeeded by Frederik Danneskjold-Samsøe
Preceded by Christian Rantzau	Diocesan Governor of Fyns Stiftamt; 1760–1767	Succeeded by Henrik Bille-Brahe
