= Hans Bøchmann Melchior =

Danish naturalist

Hans Bøchmann Melchior (14 May 1773 – 11 September 1831) was a Danish Naturalist.

He was the author of Den danske Stats og Norges Pattedyr (The mammals of the Danish state and Norway), published posthumously in 1834.
