= Diocesan governor (Norway) =

The diocesan governor (Norwegian: Stiftamtmann) was the head government official that oversaw the civil administration within a diocese in the Kingdom of Denmark-Norway and later in Norway. The bishop of the diocese oversaw the religious administration in the diocese and together, the two officials were the highest officials in the diocese, reporting directly to the king.

Each diocese typically was made up of several counties which were led by a county governor (Norwegian: amtmann). The diocesan governor oversaw all the county governors within the diocese. The diocesan governor was the king's representative in the diocese, and their job was to ensure that the king's orders and laws were obeyed. The diocesan governor was also to make sure that the bishop of the diocese did not succumb to heresy or other problems.

Often, but not always, the diocesan governor also simultaneously held the role of county governor for one of the diocese's counties. The diocesan governor of Kristiania was often called the vice-stadholder, meaning he was just below the rank of the stadholder who was the governor-general of Norway. The diocesan governor of Kristiania stood slightly higher in rank than the other diocesan governors in Norway.

In Norway, there traditionally were four diocesan governors starting in the late 1600s, but in the mid-1800s, there were two more dioceses created, so two more diocesan governors were added.

- Diocesan Governor of Kristiania (1664-1918). This governor was based in Kristiania and oversaw the entire Diocese of Kristiania. It was historically called the Diocese of Aggershuus (1664–1843) and Diocese of Christiania (1843–1877). This governor oversaw the counties of Akershus amt, Buskerud amt, Kristiania amt, Smaalenenes amt, and Jarlsberg og Larvik amt (prior to 1864, it also included Hedemarkens amt and Kristians amt).
- Diocesan Governor of Bergen (1660–1918). This governor was based in Bergen, oversaw the entire Diocese of Bergen. This governor oversaw the counties of Nordre Bergenhus amt, Søndre Bergenhus amt, Bergen amt, and part of Romsdalen amt (prior to 1844, it also included Finmarkens amt, Nordlandenes amt, and Tromsø amt).
- Diocesan Governor of Kristiansand (1669–1918). This governor was based in Kristiansand, oversaw the entire Diocese of Kristiansand. Historically, this diocese was based in the city of Stavanger from 1669–1681, when it was known as the Diocese of Stavanger. In 1662, the diocese was renamed as the Diocese of Christianssand and its headquarters were moved to the town of Christianssand. In 1870, the spelling was changed to Kristiansand. This governor oversaw the counties of Bratsberg amt, Lister og Mandals amt, Nedenæs amt, and Stavanger amt.
- Diocesan Governor of Trondhjem (1687–1918). This governor was based in Trondheim, oversaw the entire Diocese of Trondhjem. This governor oversaw the counties of Nordre Trondhjems amt, Søndre Trondhjems amt, and part of Romsdalen amt.
- Diocesan Governor of Tromsø (1844–1918). This governor was based in Tromsø, oversaw the entire Diocese of Tromsø. This governor oversaw the counties of Finmarkens amt, Nordlandenes amt, and Tromsø amt.
- Diocesan Governor of Hamar (1864–1918). This governor was based in Hamar, oversaw the entire Diocese of Hamar. This governor oversaw the counties of Kristians amt and Hedemarkens amt.

Over time, the overarching role of the diocesan governor lost some of its significance and in administrative reforms in 1918, the job was abolished effective on 1 January 1919. During this reform, the county governors were re-named as fylkesmann.
