= Fladmark =

Fladmark is a Norwegian surname. Notable people with the surname include:

- Helene Fladmark (born 1966), Norwegian politician
- Oscar Randolph Fladmark (1922–1955), American fighter pilot
- Sture Fladmark (born 1967), Norwegian footballer and manager
