= Ulrik Fredrik de Cicignon =

Norwegian military officer

Major General Ulrik Fredril de Cicignon
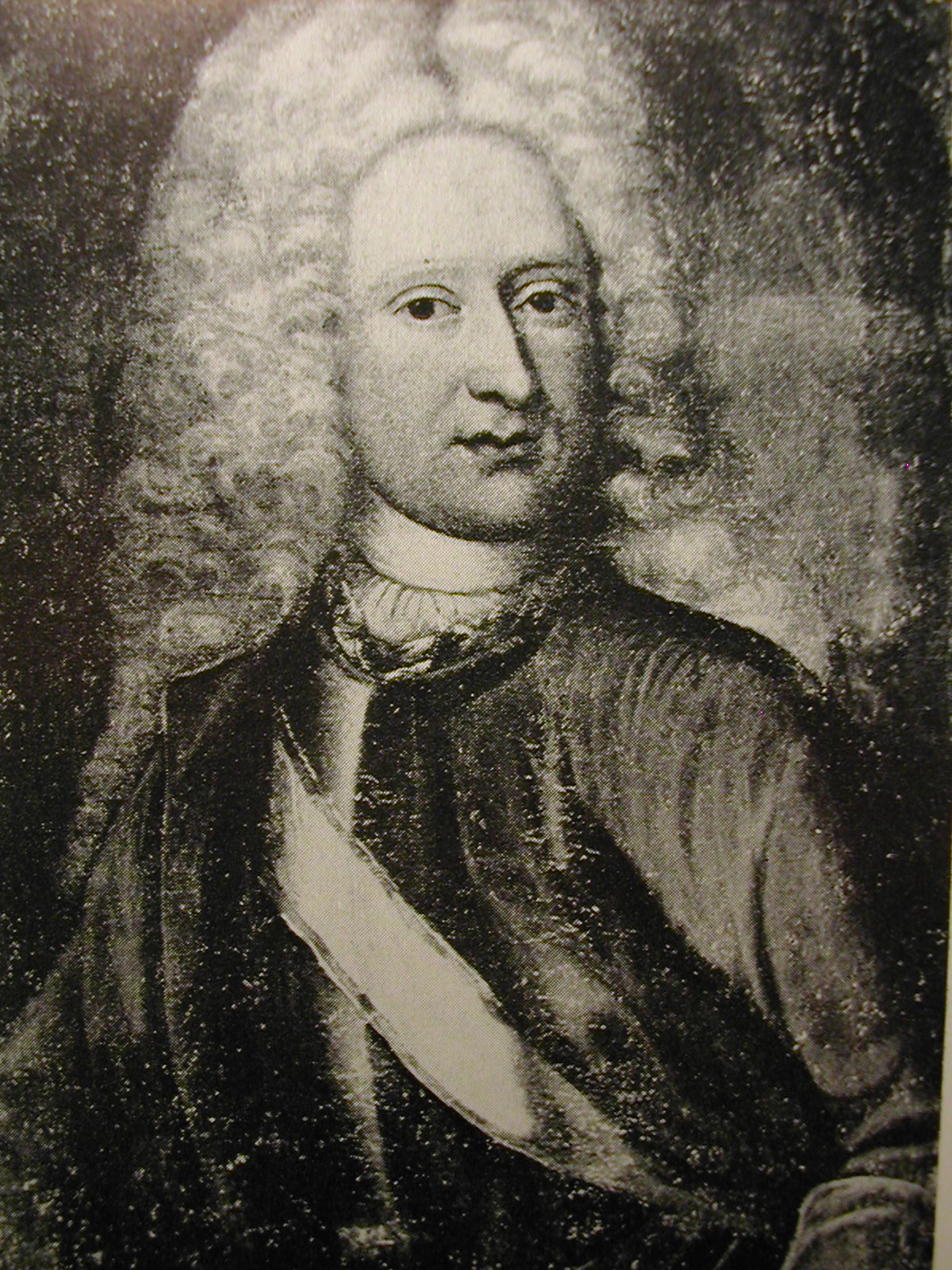
- Born: 1698; Akershus Fortress, Christiania
- Died: 8 June 1772 (aged 73–74) Sønderborg
- Allegiance: Denmark-Norway
- Rank: Major General

Ulrik Frederik de Cicignon (1698 – 8 June 1772) was a Norwegian military officer. He is best known for his part in Strilekrigen, an 18th-century farmer's rebellion, in Bergen.

== Early life ==
He was probably born at Akershus Fortress in Christiania (now Oslo, Norway). He was the son of Major General Frederik Christoph von Cicignon (c. 1667-1719) and Karen Hausmann (1682-1744). He was also the grandson of the Luxembourg-born military officer and engineer, Johan Caspar von Cicignon (1625-1696). He studied at the Académie des Chevaliers in Strasbourg and the Académie de Lorraine in Nancy, France.

== Career ==
In 1718, he was appointed First Lieutenant within the Søndenfjeldske Gevorbne Infantry Regiment. He became captain in 1720 and then rose through the ranks until 1746 when he was made Colonel and head of the 2nd Vesterlenske National Infantry Regiment. In 1749, he had been appointed stiftamtmann in Bergen. He was regiment commander in 1750. He was knighted in 1754 with the title of Major General and became a member of the Privy Council in 1764.

== Role in Strilekrigen ==
In autumn 1762, the national government in Copenhagen established an extra per capita tax for every person over twelve years, which was later reduced to a charge per household. These extra taxes were intended to help pay loans from foreign governments and to support the price of the Danish-Norwegian currency at the stock market in Hamburg.

Strilekrigen took place in Bergen on 18 April 1765, when about 2,000 common people from Nordhordland poured into Bergen to protest against the harsh action of the extra tax. The extra tax had hit the poor farmers and fishermen in rural areas around Bergen particularly hard. The protests, which became violent, were particularly directed at Cicignon.

Rebellions of this magnitude was unprecedented in the 18th century, and officials in Copenhagen were appalled. The authorities send an inquiry north consisting of top officials on a warship. The leaders of the rebellion were indicted by the general court and were convicted of disturbance of public order. The result was that a few farmers ended in prison for life after being pardoned from the death sentence. The extra tax was later abolished in Norway in 1772 but continued in force in Denmark. After the rebellion Cicignon sought and received dismissal as stiftamtmann in May 1766. He moved to Sønderborg in the Duchy of Schleswig, where he died in 1772.

Government offices
Preceded by Christian Møinichen	County Governor of Bergenhus amt 1749–1766	Succeeded by Jørgen Erik Skeel
Preceded by Christian Møinichen	County Governor of Bergenhus stiftamt 1749–1766	Succeeded by Jørgen Erik Skeel
