= Tore Schei =

Chief Justice of the Supreme Court of Norway
- In office 1 August 2002 – 1 March 2016
- Preceded by: Carsten Smith
- Succeeded by: Toril Marie Øie

Personal details
- Born: 19 February 1946 (age 80) Oslo, Norway
- Parent: Andreas Schei

Tore Schei (born 19 February 1946) is a Norwegian judge and lawyer. He was Chief Justice of the Supreme Court of Norway from 1 August 2002 until he retired in 2016, and was succeeded by Toril Marie Øie.

He was born in Oslo as a son of Andreas Schei. He is a nephew of Nikolai Schei.

He graduated in law in 1971, and was granted the right to work with Supreme Court cases in 1974. Between 1972 and 1981 he worked for the Office of the Attorney General of Norway. He was also a deputy judge in Ytre Follo District Court during this period, from 1975 to 1976, and was promoted to presiding judge in the Eidsivating Court of Appeal. On 18 October 1985 he was appointed as Justice of the Supreme Court and took office in March the following year. Since 2002, he has been Chief Justice of the Supreme Court of Norway.

He also led the Scandinavian inquiry looking into the Scandinavian Star accident. In 2002 he was named Commander with Star of the Royal Norwegian Order of St. Olav, and in 2018 Commander Grand Cross of the Order of the Lion of Finland.

Legal offices
Preceded by Carsten Smith	Chief Justice of the Supreme Court of Norway; 2002–2016	Succeeded by Toril Marie Øie
