= Adeline Werligh =

Danish-Norwegian stage actor (1813–1907)

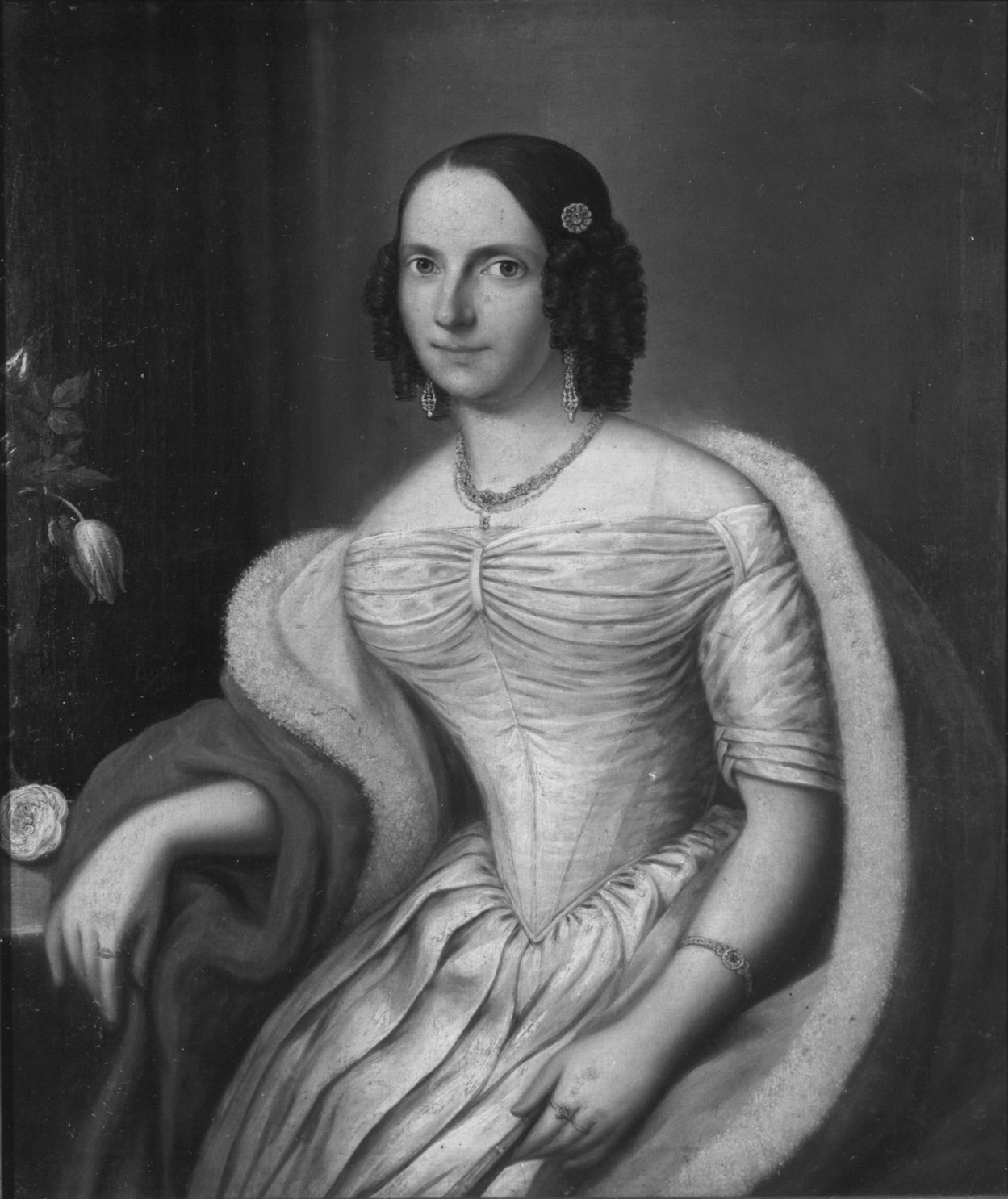
Adeline Werligh

Luise Adeline Werligh Flack (23 December 1813 – 11 September 1907), simply known as Adeline Werligh, was a Danish-Norwegian stage actress and theatre manager.

Luise Adeline Werligh Falck was the daughter of Christian Gottfried Falck and Cathrine Marie Ostenfeld. She was born in Tranekær, Denmark. She was first married to Fredrich Christian August Werligh (1795–1841) and toured with his theatre company in Denmark, Norway and Sweden from 1830. When she became a widow in 1841, she took over the company. She married a second time in 1844 to Herman Didrik Hagerup (1816–1900) son of Norwegian official Edvard Hagerup (1781–1853). They were the parents of Nina Hagerup (1845–1935), wife of the composer Edvard Grieg, nephew of Herman.

She was the first woman to become theatre manager in Denmark. She was a successful manager of the Werligh company, which played an important role in both Denmark and Norway during the 1830s and 1840s. As an actor, she was also given very good reviews. She retired after he remarriage in 1844. From 1850 to 1851, she was a drama instructor at Det norske Theater in Bergen.
