= Aage Thor Falkanger =

Norwegian judge and legal scholar

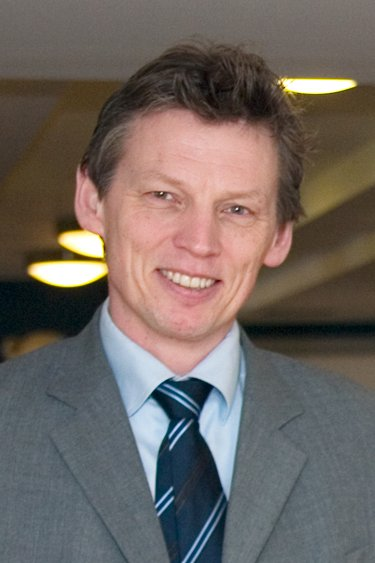

Aage Thor Falkanger (born 18 February 1965) is a Norwegian judge and legal scholar.

He was born in Oslo, and took the cand.jur. degree in 1990. He was a research fellow at the University of Tromsø from 1995 to 1999, and took the dr.juris degree in 1999. He was a presiding judge in Hålogaland Court of Appeal from 1999 to 2007, professor of law at the University of Tromsø from 2007 to 2010 and an acting Supreme Court Justice in 2007 and 2009.

In May 2010 he was appointed as a Supreme Court Justice. In February 2014 he was appointed by Parliament as the new Norwegian Parliamentary Ombudsman for Public Administration. In 2020 he returned to the Supreme Court.

Civic offices
Preceded by Arne Fliflet	Norwegian Parliamentary Ombudsman; 2014–2020	Succeeded by Hanne Harlem
