= Johan Randulf Bull =

Norwegian judge (1749–1829)

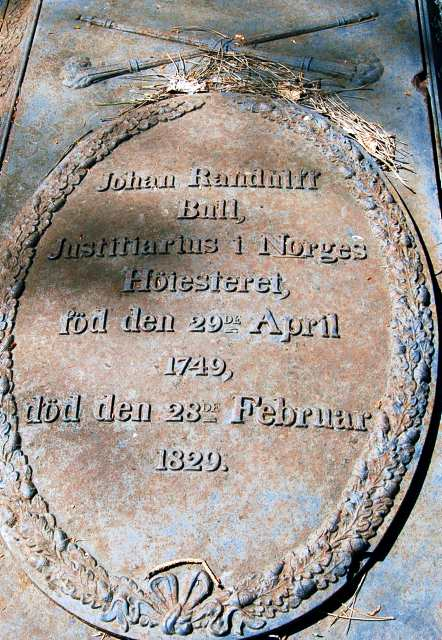
From his headstone at Larvik church.

Johan Randulf Bull (29 April 1749 – 28 February 1829) was a Norwegian judge.

He was born in Stod in Nordre Trondheim, as the brother of Johan Lausen Bull. He took the jurist examination in Copenhagen in 1778, and was a member of Det Norske Selskab there. He played the role figure "Mads" at the premiere of Johan Herman Wessel's satirical play Kierlighed uden Strømper in 1772.

From 1802 he was County Governor of Søndre Bergenhus Amt (today named Hordaland). He was instrumental in organising the defence of Bergen during the war with Great Britain.

In 1814, at the advent of Norwegian national independence, he was appointed the first Chief Justice of the Supreme Court of Norway. The court was operative from 1815. He left in 1827. He died two years later in Larvik.

He was the father of Georg Jacob Bull, who followed in his father's footsteps as Chief Justice from 1836 to 1854.

In 1817 Bull, together with minister Niels Treschow and Nicolay Erik Arbin (1743–1825) initiated a revival of The Norwegian Society in Christiania.

Bull became Knight, Order of the Dannebrog (RDO) in 1811. He was Knight of the Order of the Polar Star (RNO) from 1815, and received the Grand Cross (KmstkNO) in 1818.

Government offices
Preceded by Frederik Hauch	County Governor of Søndre Bergenhus amt 1802–1815	Succeeded by Wilhelm Frimann Koren Christie
Preceded by Frederik Hauch	County Governor of Bergenhus stiftamt 1802–1815	Succeeded by Wilhelm Frimann Koren Christie
Legal offices
New office	Chief Justice of the Supreme Court of Norway; 1814–1827	Succeeded by Christian Magnus Falsen
