= List of diocesan governors of Bergen =

The diocesan governor of Bergen stiftamt in Norway was a government agency of the Kingdom of Norway. The title was Stiftamtmann before 1919, and in 1919 all stiftamt were abolished in favor of equal counties (Norwegian: fylker).

The stiftamt (principal county) of Bergenhus (later simplified to Bergen stiftamt) was established in 1662 by the king. It was originally made up of several subordinate counties: Nordlandenes, Sunnmøre, Søndre Bergenhus, and Nordre Bergenhus. Bergenhus stiftamt was led by a stiftamtmann and the subordinate counties were led by an amtmann. The seat of the stiftamt was the city of Bergen. In 1871, the city of Bergen was split off as a separate amt (county), and the stiftamtmann also assumed the role of Bergen's amtmann until 1918. In 1919, there was a large county reorganization in Norway and every stiftamt was abolished and the counties were renamed fylker.

The diocesan governor is the government's representative in the diocese which was made up of multiple subordinate counties. The governor carries out the resolutions and guidelines of the Storting and government. This is done first by the governor performing administrative tasks on behalf of the ministries. Secondly, the diocesan governor also monitors the activities of the county governors and the municipalities and is the appeal body for many types of municipal decisions.

== List of diocesan governors ==
Bergen stiftamt has had the following governors:

Diocesan governors of Bergen stiftamt
Start	End	Name
1662	1665	Ove Bjelke (1611–1674)
1665	1666	Claus von Ahlefeldt (1614–1674)
1666	1667	Georg Reichwein (1593–1667)
1667	1669	Hans Hansen Lillienskiold (1610–1681)
1669	1679	Johan Frederik von Marschalck (1618–1679)
1679	1681	Hans Hansen Lillienskiold (1610–1681)
1681	1699	Christian Gyldenløve, Greve af Samsøe (1674–1703)
1699	1704	Christian Stockfleth (1639–1704)
1704	1704	Mats de Tonsberg (1638–1705); Served concurrently as Amtmann for Bergenhus amt.
1704	1710	Vilhelm de Tonsberg (1680–1731); Served concurrently as Amtmann for Bergenhus amt.
1710	1711	Edvard Hammond (1688–1711); Served concurrently as Amtmann for Bergenhus amt.
1711	1728	Andreas Undall (1669–1728); Served concurrently as Amtmann for Bergenhus amt.
1728	1732	Wilhelm August von der Osten (1697–1764); Served concurrently as Amtmann for Bergenhus amt.
1732	1738	Ulrik Kaas (1677–1746)
1738	1741	Christian Bagger (1692–1741); Served concurrently as Amtmann for Bergenhus amt.
1741	1749	Christian Møinichen (1683–1749); Served concurrently as Amtmann for Bergenhus amt.
1743	1744	Jonas Lym (1679–1760); Acting for Møinichen
1749	1766	Ulrik Fredrik de Cicignon (1698–1772); Served concurrently as Amtmann for Bergenhus amt.
1766	1768	Jørgen Erik Skeel (1737–1795); Served concurrently as Amtmann for Søndre Bergenhus amt.
1768	1772	Christian Petersen (1701–1775); Served concurrently as Amtmann for Søndre Bergenhus amt.
1772	1774	Albrecht Philip von Levetzau (1744–1817); Served concurrently as Amtmann for Søndre Bergenhus amt.
1774	1789	Christian de Schouboe (1737–1789); Served concurrently as Amtmann for Søndre Bergenhus amt.
1789	1802	Frederik Hauch (1754–1839); Served concurrently as Amtmann for Søndre Bergenhus amt.
1802	1815	Johan Randulf Bull (1749–1829); Served concurrently as Amtmann for Søndre Bergenhus amt.
1815	1825	Wilhelm Frimann Koren Christie (1778–1849); Served concurrently as Amtmann for Søndre Bergenhus amt.
1825	1827	Christian Magnus Falsen (1782–1830); Served concurrently as Amtmann for Søndre Bergenhus amt.
1829	1834	Georg Jacob Bull (1785–1854); Served concurrently as Amtmann for Søndre Bergenhus amt (1829-1831).
1834	1852	Edvard Hagerup (1781–1853)
1834	1850	Jens Schydtz (1792–1859)
1859	1875	Paul Meyer Smit (1813–1875)
1875	1884	Nicolai Ditlev Ammon Ræder (1817–1884)
1884	1907	Justin Gottfried Andreas Hoffmann (1836–1907)
1907	1918	Hroar Olsen (1859–1941); Served concurrently as Amtmann for Bergen amt. Served concurrently as Amtmann for Søndre Bergenhus amt.
Office abolished on 1 January 1919.
