= Erling Sandene =

Norwegian judge and civil servant

Chief Justice of the Supreme Court of Norway
- In office 1984–1991
- Preceded by: Rolv Ryssdal
- Succeeded by: Carsten Smith

Personal details
- Born: April 7, 1921
- Died: 5 March 2015 (aged 93)
- Spouse: Erna Harbitz Torstenson

Erling Sandene (7 April 1921 – 5 March 2015) was a Norwegian judge and civil servant.

== Early and family life ==
He was born in Bærum, a son of Jensine Sæther (1887–1981) and her schoolteacher husband Johan Sandene (1885–1945). Sandene married Erna Harbitz Torstenson in 1949 and they remained married until her death in 1986.

He enrolled as a student in 1940, and graduated as cand.jur. in 1943 after only three years. He was also involved in the Norwegian resistance movement.

== Career ==
In 1945 Sandene began his legal career as a deputy judge in Eidsvoll, where he helped handle the postwar legal purge. In 1946 Sandene began working in the Ministry of Justice and the Police. He was promoted to deputy under-secretary of state in 1962.

Sandene became County Governor of Møre og Romsdal from 1966 to 1972. He then served as Supreme Court Justice beginning in 1972 as well as Norwegian Parliamentary Ombudsman from 1974 to 1982. From 1984 to 1991, Sandene was the 17th Chief Justice of the Supreme Court.

== Death and honors ==
Sandene died on March 5, 2015. During his lifetime (1982), Sandene was appointed a Commander with Star of the Order of St. Olav in 1982, and was also a freemason.

Civic offices
Preceded by Erling Anger	County Governor of Møre og Romsdal; 1966–1972	Succeeded by Kåre Ellingsgård
Preceded by Andreas Schei	Norwegian Parliamentary Ombudsman; 1974–1982	Succeeded by Audvar Os
Legal offices
Preceded by Rolv Ryssdal	Chief Justice of the Supreme Court of Norway; 1984–1991	Succeeded by Carsten Smith
