= List of county governors of Hordaland =

Hordaland coat of arms

Norway

The county governor of Hordaland county in Norway represented the central government administration in the county. The office of county governor is a government agency of the Kingdom of Norway; the title was Amtmann (before 1919) and then Fylkesmann (after 1919). On 1 January 2019, the office was merged with the county governor of Sogn og Fjordane into the county governor of Vestland.

The large Bergenhus stiftamt was established in 1660 by the king and it had several subordinate counties (amt) including Bergenhus amt. In 1662, a stiftamtmann was named for Bergenhus stiftamt (see List of Diocesan Governors of Bergen). Then in 1681, the first amtmann of Bergenhus county was named. In 1763, the northern part of the county was split off to become Nordre Bergenhus amt and the southern part that remained was renamed Søndre Bergenhus amt. The seat of the amt was at Bergen. In 1871, the city of Bergen was split off as a separate county. Bergen and Søndre Bergenhus counties shared a county governor from 1919-1972. In 1919, the Søndre Bergenhus county was renamed Hordaland. In 1972, Bergen county was merged back into Hordaland. In 2020, Hordaland and Sogn og Fjordane counties were merged into Vestland county.

The county governor is the government's representative in the county. The governor carries out the resolutions and guidelines of the Storting and government. This is done first by the county governor performing administrative tasks on behalf of the ministries. Secondly, the county governor also monitors the activities of the municipalities and is the appeal body for many types of municipal decisions.

== Names ==
The word for county (amt or fylke) has changed over time as has the name of the county. From 1681 until 1762, the title was Amtmann i Bergenhus amt. From 1763 until 1918, the title was Amtmann i Søndre Bergenhus amt. From 1 January 1919 until 1 January 2019, the title was Fylkesmann i Hordaland fylke.

== List of county governors ==
Hordaland county has had the following governors:

County governors of Hordaland
Start	End	Name
1681	10 Oct 1690	Laurids Lindenov (1650–1690)
1691	1697	Hans Nielsen (c. 1630–1697)
1697	1702	Axel Rosenkrantz (1670–1723)
1702	1704	Christian Stockfleth (1639–1704); Served concurrently as Stiftamtmann for Bergen stiftamt.
1704	1704	Mats de Tonsberg (1638–1705); Served concurrently as Stiftamtmann for Bergen stiftamt.
1704	1710	Vilhelm de Tonsberg (1680–1731); Served concurrently as Stiftamtmann for Bergen stiftamt.
1710	1711	Edvard Hammond (1688–1711); Served concurrently as Stiftamtmann for Bergen stiftamt.
1711	1728	Andreas Undall (1669–1728); Served concurrently as Stiftamtmann for Bergen stiftamt.
1728	1738	Wilhelm August von der Osten (1697–1764); Served concurrently as Stiftamtmann for Bergen stiftamt (1728-1732).
1738	1741	Christian Bagger (1692–1741); Served concurrently as Stiftamtmann for Bergen stiftamt.
1741	1749	Christian Møinichen (1683–1749); Served concurrently as Stiftamtmann for Bergen stiftamt.
1743	1744	Jonas Lym (1679–1760); Acting for Møinichen
1749	1766	Ulrik Fredrik de Cicignon (1698–1772); Served concurrently as Stiftamtmann for Bergen stiftamt.
1766	1768	Jørgen Erik Skeel (1737–1795); Served concurrently as Stiftamtmann for Bergen stiftamt.
1768	1772	Christian Petersen (1701–1775; Served concurrently as Stiftamtmann for Bergen stiftamt.
1772	1774	Albrecht Philip von Levetzau (1744–1817); Served concurrently as Stiftamtmann for Bergen stiftamt
1774	1789	Christian de Schouboe (1737–1789); Served concurrently as Stiftamtmann for Bergen stiftamt.
1789	1802	Frederik Hauch (1754–1839); Served concurrently as Stiftamtmann for Bergen stiftamt.
1802	1815	Johan Randulf Bull (1749–1829); Served concurrently as Stiftamtmann for Bergen stiftamt.
1815	1825	Wilhelm Frimann Koren Christie (1778–1849); Served concurrently as Stiftamtmann for Bergen stiftamt.
1825	1827	Christian Magnus Falsen (1782–1830); Served concurrently as Stiftamtmann for Bergen stiftamt.
1829	1831	Georg Jacob Bull (1785–1854); Served concurrently as Stiftamtmann for Bergen stiftamt.
1831	1834	Edvard Hagerup (1781–1853)
1834	1850	Jens Schydtz (1792–1859)
1850	1860	Niels Petersen Vogt (1817–1894)
1860	1869	Hans Thomas Meinich (1819–1878)
1869	1877	Niels Mathias Rye (1824–1905); Served concurrently as Amtmann for Bergen amt (1871-1877).
1878	1897	Claus Nieuwejaar Worsøe (1822–1906); Served concurrently as Amtmann for Bergen amt.
1898	1918	Hroar Olsen (1859–1941); Served concurrently as Stiftamtmann for Bergen stiftamt (1907-1918). Served concurrently as Amtmann for Bergen amt.
1918	1929	Kristian Friis Petersen (1867–1932); Served concurrently as Amtmann for Bergen amt.
1929	1933	Ernst Andreas Johannesen (1870–1957); Served concurrently as Amtmann for Bergen amt.
1934	1949	Gjert Lindebrækk (1879–1960); Replaced from 1941-1945 by the WWII occupied government. Served concurrently as Amtmann for Bergen amt.
1941	1941	Ketil Gjerløv Fleischer Harnoll (1909–1974) (WWII occupied government)
1941	1 July 1944	Christian Astrup (1909–1983) (WWII occupied government)
1 July 1944	May; 1945	Ole Eberhard Rømcke (1899–1968) (WWII occupied government)
1949	1966	Mons Lid (1896–1967); Served concurrently as Amtmann for Bergen amt.
1966	1984	Lars Leiro (1914–2005); Served concurrently as Amtmann for Bergen amt (1966-1972).
1984	1998	Håkon Randal (1930–2012)
1998	1 April 2010	Svein Alsaker (1940–present)
1 April 2010	1 June 2010	Rune Fjeld (1951–present) (Acting governor)
1 June 2010	31 Dec 2018	Lars Sponheim (1957–present)
Office abolished on 1 January 2019. See List of county governors of Vestland
