= Georg Bull =

Georg Bull may refer to:

- Georg Andreas Bull (1829–1917), Norwegian architect
- Georg Jacob Bull (1785–1854), Norwegian jurist and politician
