= Andreas Schei =

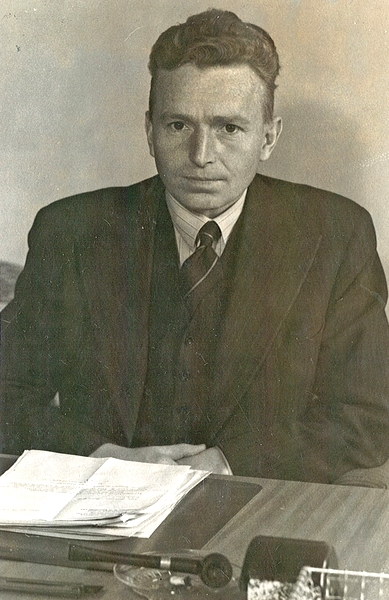
- Andreas Olai Schei, c. 1938
- Born: Andreas Olai Schei; 7 October 1902; Førde Municipality, Norway
- Died: 25 December 1989 (aged 87); Bærum Municipality, Norway
- Occupations: Jurist and civil servant
- Spouse: Karin Randi Bache-Wiig
- Children: Tore Schei
- Family: Per Schei (father), Johanne Schei (mother), Nikolai Schei (brother)

Andreas Olai Schei (7 October 1902 – 25 December 1989) was a Norwegian jurist and civil servant.

He was born in Førde Municipality as the son of Per Schei (1872–1960) and Johanne Schei (1874–1963). He was a younger brother of Nikolai Schei. In 1936 he married Karin Randi Bache-Wiig (1910–1996). He is the father of Chief Justice Tore Schei.

After spending time in France he enrolled in law studies and took the cand.jur. degree in 1926. He was a deputy judge from 1926 to 1929 and a secretary in the Ministry of Justice and the Police from 1929 to 1939. In 1939 he was hired in the Ministry of Provisioning, and from 1941 to 1942 he was an acting deputy under-secretary of state in the Ministry of Trade. Then, after three years in the company Norsk Brændselolje, he was appointed as deputy under-secretary of state in the Ministry of Justice in 1945.

In 1946 he was appointed as a Supreme Court Justice. From 1962 to 1974 he served as the Norwegian Parliamentary Ombudsman for Public Administration. He also served as member of other public boards and committees. He was decorated with the Grand Cross of the Royal Norwegian Order of St. Olav in 1972. He died on 25 December 1989 in Bærum Municipality.

Civic offices
New office	Norwegian Parliamentary Ombudsman; 1962–1974	Succeeded by Erling Sandene
