= Audvar Os =

Norwegian barrister and civil servant

Audvar Os (8 September 1920 – 25 June 2014) was a Norwegian barrister and civil servant.

He was born in Oslo. He served as assistant secretary in the Ministry of Justice and the Police from 1956 to 1961, and then worked as a lawyer. From 1963 he had access to Supreme Court cases. From 1967 to 1981 he worked for Oslo municipality, and from 1982 to 1990 he was the Norwegian Parliamentary Ombudsman for Public Administration.

Os was awarded the Order of St. Olav in 1986.

Civic offices
Preceded by Erling Sandene	Norwegian Parliamentary Ombudsman; 1982–1990	Succeeded by Arne Fliflet
