= Johan Lausen Bull =

Norwegian jurist, politician and land owner

Johan Lausen Bull (14 May 1751 – 29 July 1817) was a Norwegian jurist, politician and land owner. He lived most of his life in Denmark-Norway.

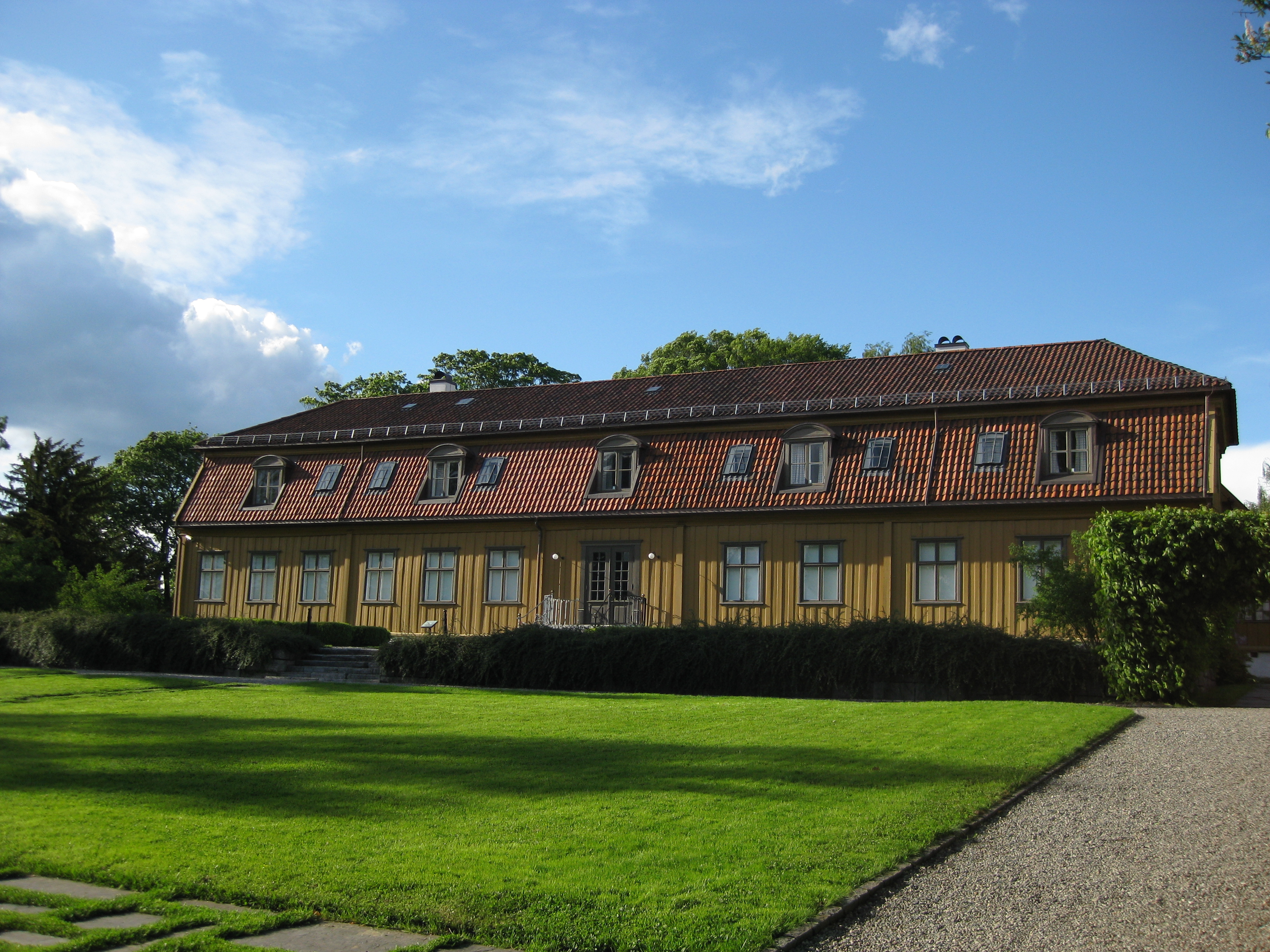
Tøyen Manor

He was born in Stod in Nordre Trondheim, Norway. He was the son of Captain Jørgen Andreas Bull (1703–1764) and Dorothea Catharina Wandal Randulf (1716–1763). He was the brother of Johan Randulf Bull who served as the first Chief Justice of the Supreme Court of Norway. After their parents' death, the brothers were raised with the assistant to their cousin Henrik Helkand Bull (1732–1797), who was magistrate in Lofoten and Vesterålen from 1768 and Moss from 1773.

He took the jurist examination at the University of Copenhagen in 1776, and worked as district stipendiary magistrate (sorenskriver) in Sundmøre from 1779 to 1798. He was then president of the magistrate in Christianssand from 1798 to 1802 and in Christiania (now Oslo) from 1802 to 1815. The magistrates in Norwegian cities were forerunners of the city council, which was introduced with elected councillors in 1837.

Bull was a wealthy man who owned several large farms. In 1805, Bull acquired Tøyen Manor (Tøyen hovedgård), which he sold to King Frederik VI of Denmark in 1812. The king subsequently donated the farm to the University of Christiania (now University of Oslo). Today the former manor is owned by the Museum of Natural History at the University of Oslo. It currently provides reception rooms for the University and is situated in the University Botanical Garden.
