= Jørgen Mandix =

Norwegian judge (1759–1835)

- Born: 15 January 1759; Copenhagen, Denmark–Norway
- Died: 8 August 1835 (aged 76)
- Occupation: Judge

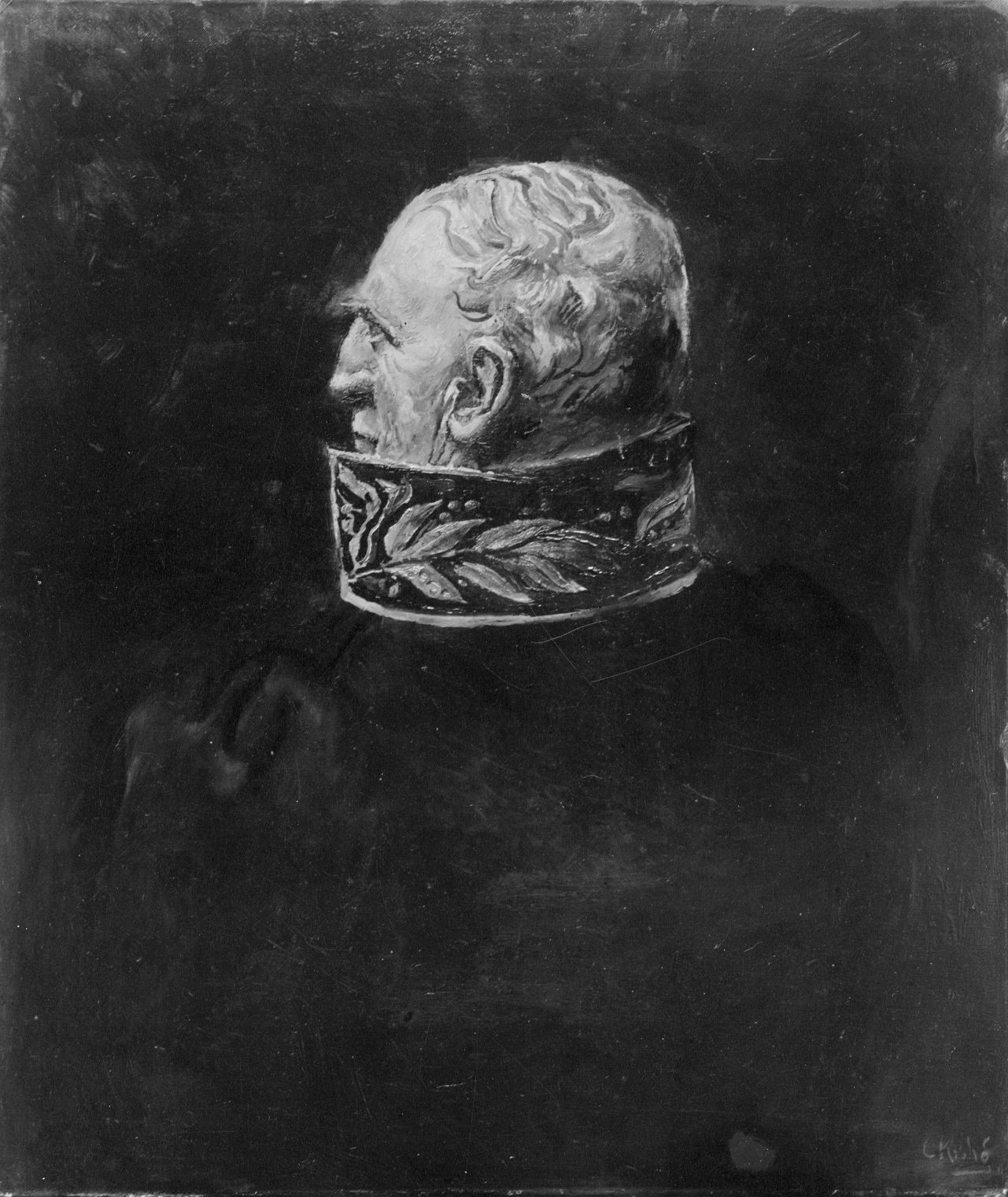

Jørgen Mandix (15 January 1759 – 8 August 1835) was a Danish-born Norwegian judge.

He was born in Copenhagen to Mauritz Mandix and Lucie Marie Ursin. He graduated as cand.jur. in 1782, and practiced law in Denmark-Norway. and was named as a Supreme Court Justice from 1814. He served as Chief Justice of the Supreme Court of Norway from 1831 to 1835.

Legal offices
Preceded by Christian Magnus Falsen	Chief Justice of the Supreme Court of Norway; 1831–1835	Succeeded by Georg Jacob Bull
