= Toril Marie Øie =

Chief Justice of the Supreme Court of Norway

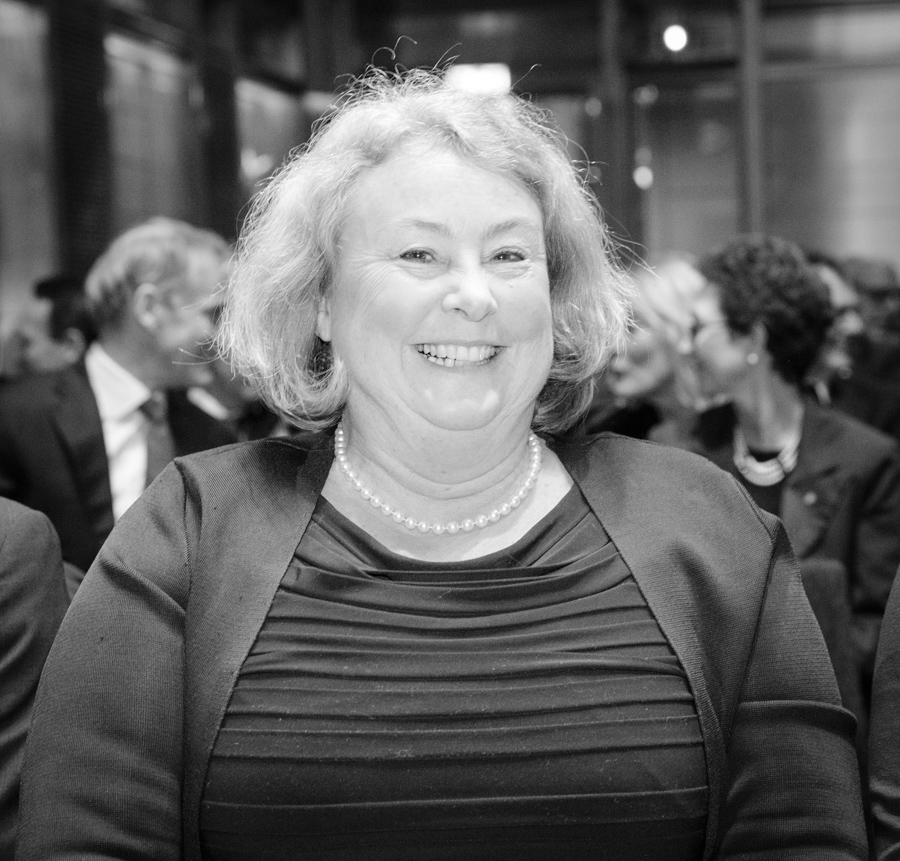
- Øie in 2018

20th Chief Justice of the Supreme Court of Norway
- Incumbent
- Assumed office 1 March 2016
- Monarchs: Harald V Haakon VIII
- Prime Minister: Erna Solberg; Jonas Gahr Støre
- Preceded by: Tore Schei

Personal details
- Born: 1960 (age 65–66) Oslo, Norway
- Education: University of Oslo Faculty of Law

Toril Marie Øie (born 1960) is a Norwegian jurist who serves as the 20th Chief Justice of the Supreme Court of Norway since 2016. Prior to her tenure as Chief Justice she was a justice on the Supreme Court from 2004 to 2016.

== Early life and education ==
Toril Marie Øie was born in Oslo, Norway, in 1960. She conducted her secondary education from 1976 to 1979, and graduated from the University of Oslo Faculty of Law in 1986. She was a lecturer at the University of Oslo Faculty of Law from 1994 to 2002.

== Career ==
In the Ministry of Justice and Public Security, Øie worked in the Legislation Department from 1986 to 2004, and became deputy director-general and Head of the Unit for Criminal Law and Procedure in the ministry in 2000. She took a leave of absence from the ministry to serve as a deputy judge, acting judge, and as acting chief judge at the Strømmen District Court from 1988 to 1990.

Taxation of Cohabitants. A Comparison with the Rules on Taxation of Spouses was published by Øie was published in 1985. Øie was a subject editor for Norsk lovkommentar from 2011 to 2015, and has written two textbooks, Crime and Punishment. Textbook in Criminal Law (1997) and Crime and Punishment. Volume 1: Introduction to Criminal Law (2001). She and Tore Schei co-authored The Disputes Act. Commentary Volume I and II (2013).

Øie was appointed to the Supreme Court of Norway in 2004. In March 2016, she was appointed as the 20th Chief Justice, becoming the first woman to hold the position. She was given the Order of St. Olav on 9 October 2018.

== Works cited ==
- "Chief Justice Toril Marie Øie". Supreme Court of Norway. Archived from the original on 23 June 2025.
- "Toril Marie Øie". Store norske leksikon. Great Norwegian Encyclopedia. Archived from the original on 4 June 2025.
