= Hugo Wathne =

Norwegian sculptor (1932–2017)

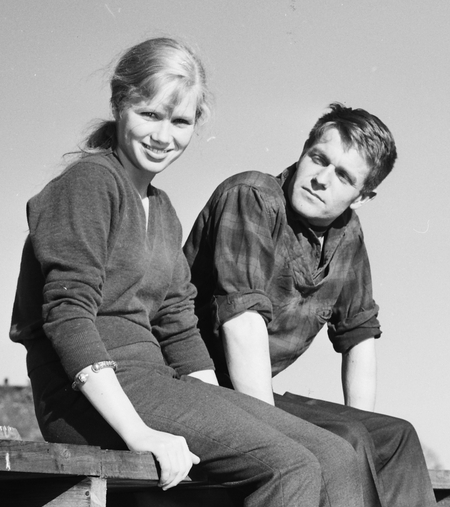
- Liv Ullmann and Hugo Frank Wathne in 1959
- Born: Hugo Frank Wathne; 25 September 1932; Stavanger, Norway
- Died: 6 September 2017 (aged 84); Stavanger, Norway
- Occupation: Sculptor
- Spouse: Berit Brænne (m. 1950; div. 1951)
- Parent: Frank Ingolf Wathne (1902-1991)
- Awards: Ingeborg og Per Palle Storms ærespris (2009)

Hugo Wathne (25 September 1932 – 6 September 2017) was a Norwegian sculptor and art instructor.

== Biography ==
Hugo Frank Wathne was born in Stavanger, Norway to Frank Ingolf Wathne and Birgit Rosenvold. His father was a painter and glass artist.

Wathne was first a student of sculptor Magnus Vigrestad. He attended the Norwegian National Academy of Craft and Art Industry (Statens Håndverks- og Kunstindustriskole) in Oslo (1949–54) and the Norwegian National Academy of Fine Arts (Statens Kunstakademi) in Oslo under Per Palle Storm (1954–57) and Per Krohg (1957–58). He trained in Copenhagen under Gottfred Eickhoff (1959) and attended the Académie de la Grande Chaumiere in Paris (1965–66).

He was awarded the Stavanger bys kulturstipend (1956), Schäffers legat (1957); Statens reisestipend (1957); Lorch-Schives legat (1962); Rolf Stenersens legat (1968) and Bærum kommunes kulturstipend (1977). He conducted study trips to study trips Sweden, Italy, France, Greece, Spain and Germany. He is represented at the National Gallery of Norway with the sculpture Inntrykk fra en reise from 1981. Among his other works are Brevduen (1970) and Akrobatfamilie (1971). ademi He was an art instructor in sculpture at Vestlandets kunstakademi in Bergen 1969–70, in ceramics at Bergen kunsthåndverkskole 1971-72 and taught at Kunstskolen in Rogaland from 1978. In 2009, he was awarded the Ingeborg og Per Palle Storms ærespris. The prize was granted jointly with Bård Breivik (1948–2016) for their significant effort for Norwegian figurative art. Hugo Wathne died during 2017 at Stavanger.

== Personal life ==
He was shortly married from 1950 until 1951 to writer and actress Berit Brænne (1918–1976).

== Other sources ==
Fredrik Koch (2008) Hugo: Hugo Wathnes kunst (Mosaikk forlag) ISBN 978-82-7902-013-4
