= Odd Einar Dørum =

Norwegian politician

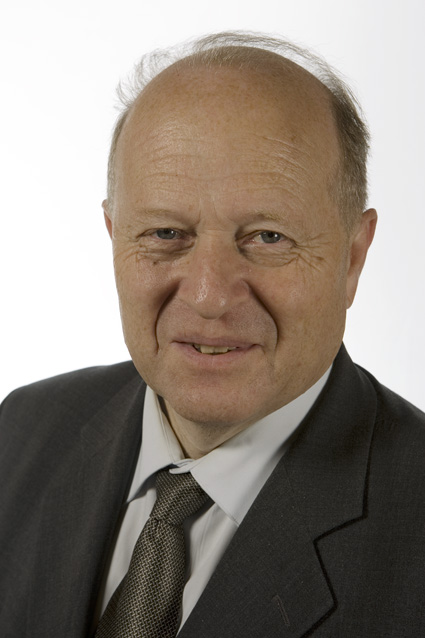

Minister of Justice and the Police
- In office 19 October 2001 – 17 October 2005
- Prime Minister: Kjell Magne Bondevik
- Preceded by: Hanne Harlem
- Succeeded by: Knut Storberget
- In office 15 March 1999 – 17 March 2000
- Prime Minister: Kjell Magne Bondevik
- Preceded by: Aud Inger Aure
- Succeeded by: Hanne Harlem

Minister of Transport and Communications
- In office 17 October 1997 – 15 March 1999
- Prime Minister: Kjell Magne Bondevik
- Preceded by: Sissel Rønbeck
- Succeeded by: Dag Jostein Fjærvoll

Member of the Storting
- In office 1 October 1997 – 30 September 2009
- Deputy: Helene Falch Fladmark; Trine Skei Grande; Alvhild Hedstein
- Constituency: Oslo
- In office 1 October 1977 – 30 September 1981
- Constituency: Sør-Trøndelag

Leader of the Liberal Party
- In office 13 March 1992 – 6 April 1996
- Preceded by: Håvard Alstadheim
- Succeeded by: Lars Sponheim
- In office 3 April 1982 – 5 April 1986
- Preceded by: Hans H. Rossbach
- Succeeded by: Arne Fjørtoft

Personal details
- Born: 12 October 1943 (age 82) Oslo, Norway
- Party: Liberal
- Spouse: Randi Gerd Øverland (m. 1968)
- Children: 2

Odd Einar Dørum (born 12 October 1943) is a Norwegian former politician and former member of parliament, representing the Liberal Party. He was leader of the party on two occasions (1982–1986 and 1992–1996) and served as minister in Kjell Magne Bondevik's both cabinets from 1997 to 2000 and again from 2001 to 2005.

== Career ==
Dørum grew up in Oslo, Bergen, and Trondheim, where he studied history at university. He was a member of Venstre's youth organization (Unge Venstre), and from 1970 to 1972 was its leader. He was a city councillor in Trondheim while working as a social worker.

Dørum was a member of parliament from 1977 to 1981 and was re-elected in 1997. He was Minister of Transport and Communications from 17 October 1997 to 15 March 1999, then Minister of Justice until 17 March 2000. He was again Minister of Justice in the second government of Kjell Magne Bondevik from 2001 to 2005. He served four terms as an elected member of the Norwegian Parliament (Stortinget) (1977–1981, 1997–2001, 2001–2005, and 2005–2009). He did not seek re-election in the 2009 election.

He was the leader of the Liberal Party from 1982 to 1986 and again from 1992 to 1996.

Despite becoming an experienced Minister of Justice, Dørum himself had a run-in with the law in his youth. He participated in a non-violent civil disobedience protest in Mardøla, Norway in 1970. Protesting against the government turning several waterfalls into powerplants, he was carried away by police together with other prominent protestors like philosopher Arne Næss. This marked the first time civil disobedience was used to protect the environment in Norway.

Dørum is known as a very grounded person, and unlike most politicians his age he does not take himself very seriously. For decades he has been a huge fan of The Lord of the Rings books and made headlines when he showed up for the premiere of The Lord of the Rings: The Return of the King wearing a hobbits robe, much to the amusement of its star Viggo Mortensen. He later donned the same outfit again in an outdoor Lord of the Rings concert in Frognerparken in Oslo in 2005.

Dørum is a Christian of part German-Jewish descent on his mother's side. He lives in Oslo, married to Randi Gerd Øverland and has two children.

Political offices
Preceded by Hanne Harlem	Norwegian Minister of Justice and the Police; 2001–2005	Succeeded by Knut Storberget
Preceded by Aud Inger Aure	Norwegian Minister of Justice and the Police; 1999–2000	Succeeded by Hanne Harlem
Preceded by Sissel Rønbeck	Norwegian Minister of Transport and Communications; 1997–1999	Succeeded by Dag Jostein Fjærvoll
Party political offices
Preceded by Håvard Alstadheim	Chairman of the Norwegian Liberal Party; 1992–1996	Succeeded by Lars Sponheim
Preceded by Hans Hammond Rossbach	Chairman of the Norwegian Liberal Party; 1982–1986	Succeeded by Arne Fjørtoft
Preceded by Kjell G. Rosland	Chairman of Young Liberals of Norway; 1970–1972	Succeeded by Carl Johan Sverdrup
