= Kristian Blystad =

Norwegian sculptor

- Born: 18 March 1946 (age 80); Bergen, Norway
- Occupation: Sculptor
- Awards: Order of St. Olav (2007); Anders Jahres kulturpris (2011)

Kristian Blystad (born 18 March 1946) is a Norwegian sculptor.

== Career ==
Blystad was born in Bergen, and is married to textile artist Sissel Blystad.

Among his works is the fountain sculpture Kronos at Majorstuen, Oslo. A granite sculpture of Wilhelm Frimann Koren Christie was erected in front of the Parliament of Norway in 1989. A statue of Christian Frederik was unveiled in front of the Parliament in May 2014. He also worked on the facade of the new Library of Alexandria. He is represented at the National Gallery of Norway and in other galleries in Oslo and Bergen.

His sculpture "26. september - torso" (2008) is located in Oslo at Olav Vs gate 5.

== Awards ==
Blystad was decorated Commander of the Order of St. Olav in 2007. He received Anders Jahres kulturpris in 2011, shared with Bård Breivik.
