= Andreas Undall =

Norwegian government official

Governor of Lister og Mandals amt
- In office 1699–1711

Diocesan Governor of Bergenhus stiftamt
- In office 1711–1728

Personal details
- Born: 1669 Christianssand, Norway
- Died: 14 May 1728 (aged 58–59) Bergen, Norway
- Citizenship: Denmark-Norway
- Education: University of Copenhagen

Andreas Undall (1669-1728) was a Norwegian government official. He served as the County Governor of Lister og Mandal county from 1699 to 1711 and then he was the Diocesan Governor of Bergenhus stiftamt from 1711 until his death in 1728.

Government offices
Preceded by Jørgen Hansen Burchart	County Governor of Lister og Mandals amt 1699–1711	Succeeded by Povel Juel
Preceded by Edvard Hammond	Diocesan Governor of Bergenhus stiftamt 1711–1728	Succeeded by Wilhelm August von der Osten
Preceded by Edvard Hammond	County Governor of Bergenhus amt 1711–1728	Succeeded by Wilhelm August von der Osten
