= Wilhelm August von der Osten =

Danish civil servant (1697–1764)

Wilhelm August van der Osten (7 January 1697 – 15 January 1764) was a Danish civil servant.

== Early life ==
Wilhelm August von der Osten was born in Copenhagen, the son of lord chamberlain Peter Christoph van der Osten (1659–1730) and Louise Benedicte von Reichow (1670–1755). He attended Sorø Academy.

== Career ==
He began his career as squire for queen Anna Sophie. He then served as the leader of the Bergenhus stiftamt (stiftsbefalingsmand) in Bergen and also the Bergenhus county governor (amtmand) from 1728 to 1732.

In 1735, he was appointed to county governor of Sorø County as well as director of Sorø Abbey. He was involved in the revival of Sorø Academy. From 1738 he also served as director of Øresund Custom House.

In 1743, he left Sorø to assume a position as director of the financial administration in Copenhagen and was also appointed as member of the treasury (rentekammeret). He vigorously advocated a limitation of state expenditure, leading to the establishment of a commission consisting of J. L. Holstein, C. A. Berckentin, J. S. Schulin and himself that was to propose budget cuts. Their proposals were approved by King Christian VI of Denmark-Norway but never executed, as a result of the death of the king in 1748. Osten was dismissed as director of the financial administration by the new king, Frederick V of Denmark-Norway, but kept his post as director of Øresund Custom House until his death in 1764.

== Awards and honours ==
Osten was appointed to Gehejmeråd in 1744 and Gehejmekonferensråd in 1755. He became a Knight of the Order of the Dannebrog in 1740 and a Knight of the Order of the Elephant in 1763. He received the Ordre de l'Union Parfaite in 1752.

== Personal life ==
Van der Osten married twice. His first wife was Charlotte Amalie Lützow (ft. 30 July 1696 - 12 May 1743), a daughter of colonel Frederik Lützow of Lundsgård and Gammelgård (c. 1657-1710) and Dorothea Magdalene von Harstall (1677-1743). His second wife was Friederike Anna Sophie von Massow (ca. 1725 - 1750), a daughter of district governor (amtmand) Christian Albrecht von Massow (c. 1690 - 1752) and Marsilia von Grabow.

Van der Osten constructed one of the first town mansions in the new Frederiksstaden district in Copenhagen. The building is now known as the Prince William Mansion, Copenhagen after a later owner.

Government offices
Preceded by Jacob Frants von der Osten	County governor of Sorø Amt; 1712—1735	Succeeded by Christoph Ernst von Beulwitz
Preceded by Andreas Undall	County Governor of Bergenhus amt 1728–1732	Succeeded by Christian Bagger
Preceded by Andreas Undall	County Governor of Bergenhus stiftamt 1728–1732	Succeeded by Ulrik Kaas
