= Norwegian Parliamentary Ombud =

The Norwegian Parliamentary Ombud (Norwegian: Sivilombudet), formerly the Norwegian Parliamentary Ombudsman (Norwegian: Sivilombudsmannen), is the ombudsman appointed by the Norwegian Parliament to safeguard the rights of individual citizens in their dealings with all levels of the public administration. The function was proposed by the Ministry of Justice and Police in 1961, approved by the Norwegian Parliament the same year, and the function created effective January 1, 1962. The function and scope is regulated in the Act relating to the Parliamentary Ombud for Public Administration.

== List of appointed parliamentary ombudsmen ==
- 1962–1974: Andreas Schei
- 1974–1982: Erling Sandene
- 1982–1990: Audvar Os
- 1990–2014: Arne Fliflet
- 2014–2019: Aage Thor Falkanger
- 2020–present: Hanne Harlem
