= Edvard Hammond =

Norwegian civil servant and politician

County Governor of Stavanger amt
- In office 1700–1710

Diocesan Governor of Bergenhus stiftamt
- In office 1710–1711

Personal details
- Born: 1668 Trondheim, Norway
- Died: 9 April 1711 (aged 42–43) Bergen, Norway
- Citizenship: Denmark-Norway
- Profession: Politician

Edvard Hammond (1688–1711) was a Norwegian civil servant and politician. He served as the County Governor of Stavanger amt from 1700 until 1710. He was then transferred to be the Diocesan Governor of Bergenhus stiftamt (and simultaneously serving as the County Governor of Bergenhus amt) from 1710 until his death in 1711.

Government offices
| Preceded by Christian Frederik Pogwisch | County Governor of Stavanger amt 1700–1710 | Succeeded by Ulrik Christian Mese |
| Preceded by Vilhelm de Tonsberg | Diocesan Governor of Bergenhus stiftamt 1710–1711 | Succeeded by Andreas Undall |
| Preceded by Vilhelm de Tonsberg | County Governor of Bergenhus amt 1710–1711 | Succeeded by Andreas Undall |
