= Hanne Harlem =

Norwegian politician (born 1964)

- Harlem in 1987

Norwegian Parliamentary Ombudsman
- Incumbent
- Assumed office 1 February 2020
- Preceded by: Aage Thor Falkanger

Minister of Justice and the Police
- In office 17 March 2000 – 19 October 2001
- Prime Minister: Jens Stoltenberg
- Preceded by: Odd Einar Dørum
- Succeeded by: Odd Einar Dørum

Oslo City Commissioner for Children and Education
- In office 1 January 1992 – 1 September 1993
- Governing Mayor: Rune Gerhardsen
- Preceded by: Robert Wright
- Succeeded by: Gro Balas

Personal details
- Born: 20 November 1964 (age 61) Oslo, Norway
- Party: Labour
- Spouse: Sam E. Harris
- Children: 3

Hanne Harlem (born 20 November 1964) is a Norwegian politician for the Labour Party. She was personal secretary to Minister of Family and Consumer Affairs in 1990, personal secretary to the Minister of Children and Family Affairs in 1991 and Minister of Justice from 2000 to 2001, in Jens Stoltenberg's first cabinet.

In October 2019, she was nominated to become the next Parliamentary Ombudsman. She assumed office on 1 February 2020. She announced in October 2026 that she would be stepping down due to health reasons.

== Personal life ==
She is a daughter of Gudmund Harlem and sister of former Norwegian Prime Minister Gro Harlem Brundtland. She is married to lawyer Sam E. Harris, with whom she has three children.

Political offices
Preceded by Robert Wright	Oslo City Commissioner of Children and Education; 1992–1993	Succeeded by Gro Balas
Preceded by Odd Einar Dørum	Minister of Justice and the Police; 2000–2001	Succeeded by Odd Einar Dørum
Civic offices
Preceded by Aage Thor Falkanger	Norwegian Parliamentary Ombudsman; 2020–present	Incumbent
