= Edvard Hagerup =

Norwegian politician (1781–1853)

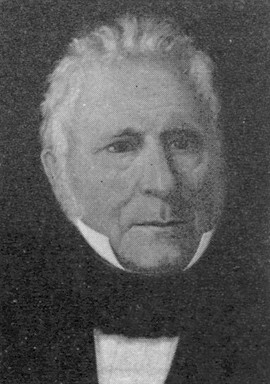
Edvard Hagerup

Edvard Eilersen Hagerup (9 September 1781 – 29 March 1853) was a Norwegian solicitor and politician.

Hagerup was born in the city of Kristiansand in Lister og Mandals amt, Norway. He was the son of Bishop Eiler (Kongel) Hagerup (b. 1718) and Edvardine Magdalene Margarethe Christie (b. 1755). During 1801, he studied at the University of Copenhagen with Wilhelm Frimann Koren Christie. Both became King's representative (Stiftsamtmann) of a county in Norway. During the formation of the Constitution of Norway signed at the Constitutional Assembly at Eidsvoll during 1814, Christie was secretary to the delegates managed by Christian Magnus Falsen and Hagerup was advisor to the Danish Prince Christian Fredrik, who was present.

He was a member of the first Norwegian Parliament (Storting). During 1814, he was asked to accept the post of Minister, which would have required him to live in Stockholm, so he abstained. At that time, he worked as an Assessor.

Hagerup was later appointed County Governor of Nordre Bergenhus amt (1822–31). As Nordre Bergenhus was administrated from the city of Bergen, outside its territory, Hagerup was elected to the Norwegian Parliament from that city for the year 1824. During 1827, he was elected to the Norwegian Parliament for a third term. From 1834 to 1852 he served as County Governor of Søndre Bergenhus amt.

== Personal life ==
He was married to Ingeborg Janson (1786–1849), daughter of estate owner, merchant and court agent, Herman Didrik Jansen. His father-in-law considered Hagerup the most likely custodian of his vast fortune and financed the transport of representatives from Bergen to Eidsvoll during 1814. Hagerup died an extremely wealthy man. Eight of his nine children lived to maturity. He was the grandfather of both the composer Edvard Hagerup Grieg (b. 1843) and his wife (Grieg's cousin) Nina Hagerup (b. 1845).

Government offices
Preceded by Christian Magnus Falsen	County Governor of Nordre Bergenhus amt 1822–1831	Succeeded by Fredrik Riis
Preceded by Georg Jacob Bull	County Governor of Søndre Bergenhus amt 1834–1852	Succeeded by Jens Schydtz
