= Arne Fliflet =

Norwegian jurist and civil servant

Arne Fliflet (born 21 May 1946) is a Norwegian jurist and civil servant.

He graduated with the cand.jur. degree in 1971. After some years as a university lector at the University of Oslo, he worked as a deputy judge in Sunnfjord from 1974 to 1975.

He was a junior solicitor from 1975, lawyer in the Office of the Attorney General of Norway from 1979 to 1986 and a private lawyer from 1987. He was appointed Norwegian Parliamentary Ombudsman for Public Administration in 1990, and served until 2014.

Civic offices
Preceded by Audvar Os	Norwegian Parliamentary Ombudsman; 1990–2014	Succeeded by Aage Thor Falkanger
