= Carsten Smith =

Norwegian judge and lawyer (1932–2026)

Chief Justice of the Supreme Court of Norway
- In office 1991–2002
- Preceded by: Erling Sandene
- Succeeded by: Tore Schei

Personal details
- Born: 12 July 1932 Oslo, Norway
- Died: 28 May 2026 (aged 93) Oslo, Norway
- Spouse: Lucy Smith

Carsten Smith (13 July 1932 – 28 May 2026) was a Norwegian judge and lawyer.

== Early life and education ==
Carsten Smith was born in Oslo on 13 July 1932. He took his examen artium at Oslo Cathedral School in 1949 and began studying law at the University of Oslo that year.

== Career ==
Smith served as Dean of the Faculty of Law, University of Oslo (1977–1979) and as Chief Justice of the Supreme Court of Norway (1991–2002). After his retirement from the court, he continued to handle international arbitration cases, and worked with the United Nations.

He was appointed Reader in Law at the University of Oslo in 1960 and Professor of Law with a specialization in commercial and banking law in 1964. He also was the first chairman of the Sami Rights Commission.

Among his many published works is Kausjonsrett. Carsten Smith was awarded the Grand Cross of the Royal Norwegian Order of St. Olav on 13 May 2003. In 1985, he received the Fritt Ord Honorary Award. He was a member of the Norwegian Academy of Science and Letters. He also received honorary degrees from several institutions, including Uppsala University and Brigham Young University.

== Personal life and death ==
In 1958, he married fellow lawyer Lucy Smith, whom he survived. One of Norway's first female lawyers, she was also a law professor and the former rector of the University of Oslo. They had three daughters who became lawyers.

Carsten Smith died in Oslo on 28 May 2026, at the age of 93.

== Honours and decorations ==
- – Grand Cross av Order of St. Olav (2003; Commander with Star 1991)
- – Commander av Order of the White Rose of Finland
- – Grand Knight's Cross of the Order of the Falcon
- – Commander Grand Cross of the Royal Order of the Polar Star (2001)

Academic offices
Preceded by	Dean of the Faculty of Law, University of Oslo; 1977–1979	Succeeded by
Legal offices
Preceded by Erling Sandene	Chief Justice of the Supreme Court of Norway; 1991–2002	Succeeded by Tore Schei
