= Bård Breivik =

Norwegian sculptor and art instructor

- Born: 23 November 1948; Bergen, Norway
- Died: 10 January 2016 (aged 67); Oslo, Norway
- Occupation: Sculptor
- Awards: Prince Eugen Medal (1995); Ingeborg og Per Palle Storms ærespris (2009)

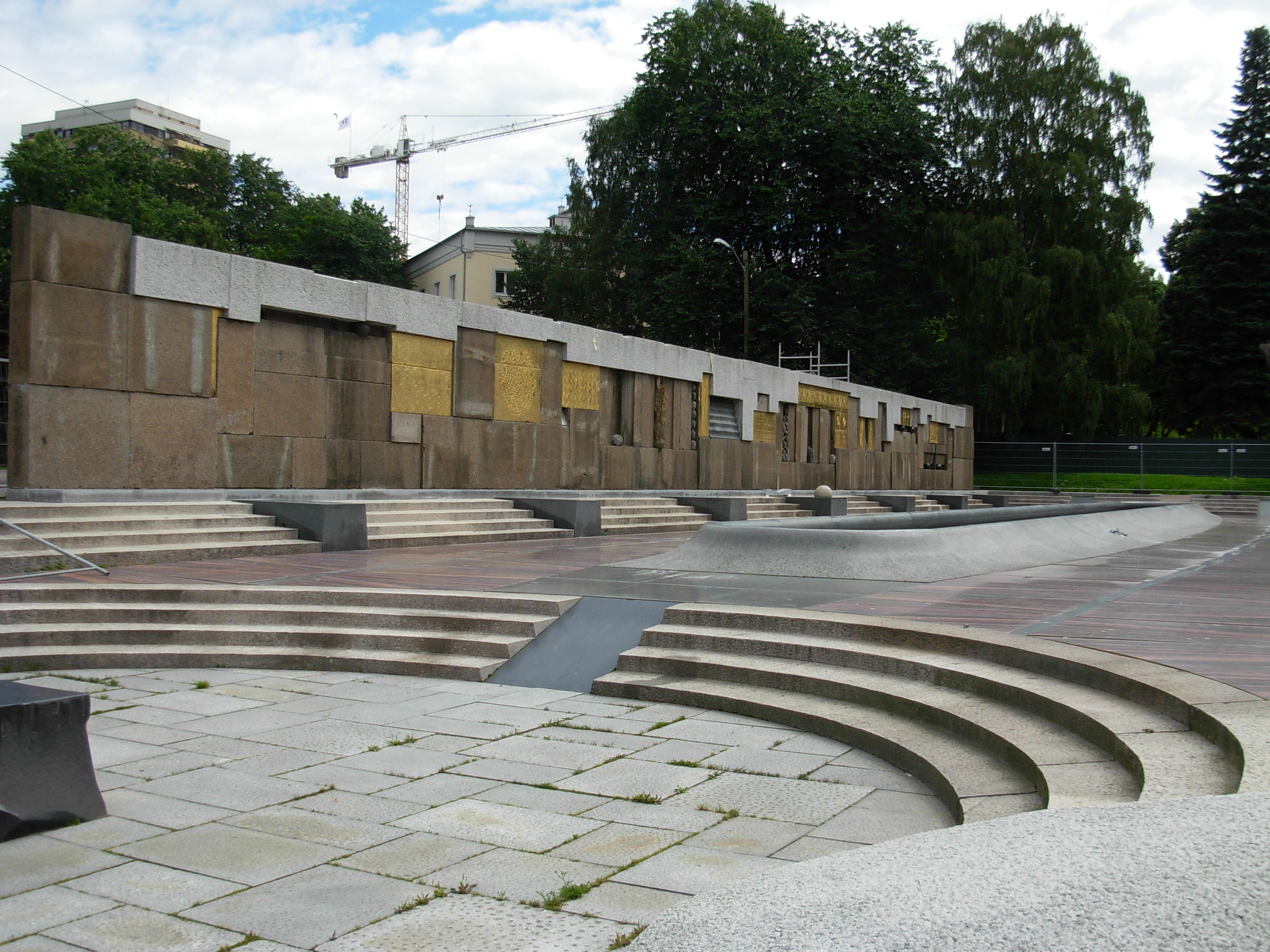
Klosterenga Sculpturpark in Oslo

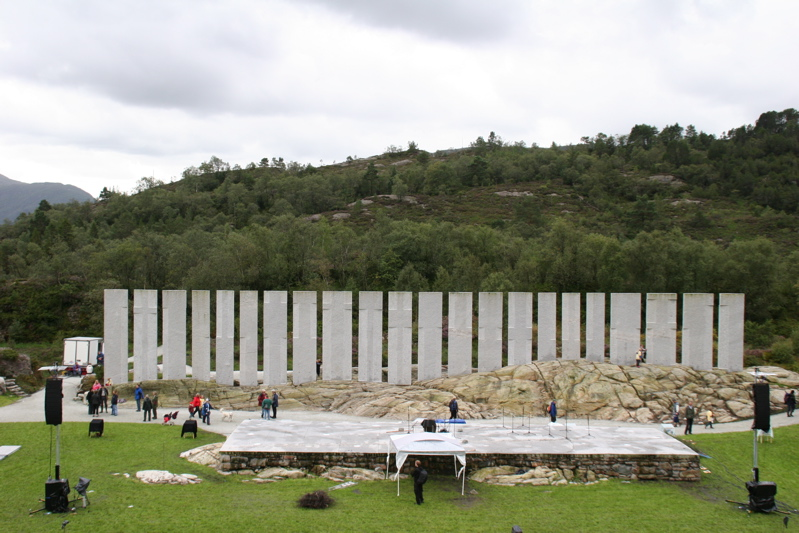
Tusenaarsstaden Gulatinget at Flolid, Gulen

Bård Breivik (23 November 1948 – 10 January 2016) was a Norwegian sculptor and art instructor.

== Biography ==
He was born in Bergen, Norway. He was the son of Thomas Breivik and Sissel Søyland. His father Thomas Breivik (1923–1999) was a notable painter, graphics artist and art instructor. Following his parents divorce in 1951, he was raised by his mother in Laksevåg. He was educated at the Bergen Academy of Art and Design (Bergen Kunsthåndverkskole and Vestlandets Kunstakademi) and St. Martin's School of Art in London. Breivik held a professorship at the Royal Institute of Art in Stockholm from 1982 to 1985 and worked actively as an artist throughout his life.

In the autumn 1981, the ‘Fibre’ exhibition opened with great success. At the same time, he did the scenography for the performance ‘Pyramider’ at the Henie-Onstad Art Centre. Following year Breivik took part in the group exhibition ‘The Sleeping Beauty – Art Now, Scandinavia Today’, at the Guggenheim Museum in New York. In 1984, Breivik took part in an international group exhibition at the Toyama Modern Art Museum in Tokyo, and he exhibited at the Nordic pavilion during the biennale in Venice in 1985. The exhibition at the Nordic pavilion was curated by Mats B. In 1991 he was invited to exhibit at The São Paulo Art Biennial. The following year he completed the decoration with stone and water called ‘Kunsthagen’ outside the newly opened art museum in Lillehammer, designed by the architects’ office Snøhetta. One of his most high-profile projects was the erection of new decorative columns at Torgallmenningen square in his hometown of Bergen, unveiled on 17 May 1999.

== Notable works ==
Klosterenga Sculpture Park (Klosterenga Sculpturpark) in Oslo was created by Bård Breivik over several years, as an alternative to Vigeland's installation in Frogner Park, and a common place for people coming from distant cultures, where they can meet and merge into one peaceful neighborhood. The intention of the multicultural space is to provide a global culture image, consisting of stone traditions from different parts of the world.

Gulatinget Millennium Park Monumental (Tusenaarsstaden Gulatinget) was erected during August 2005 in commemoration of the Millennium anniversary of the Gulating in Gulen Municipality in Sogn og Fjordane county. Gulating was one of the oldest and largest parliamentary assemblies in medieval Norway.

== Personal life ==
In 2009, he was awarded the Ingeborg og Per Palle Storms Ærespris. The honorary award was granted jointly with Hugo Wathne for their significant effort for Norwegian figurative art. He received Anders Jahres kulturpris in 2011, shared with Kristian Blystad.

Bård Breivik died at Lovisenberg Diakonale Hospital in Oslo after having fought an aggressive form of cancer for a year. He was buried at Vestre Gravlund in Oslo.
