= Nikolai Schei =

Norwegian jurist and civil servant

- Born: Nikolai Andreas Schei; 9 May 1901; Førde, Norway
- Died: 25 May 1985 (aged 84); Førde, Norway
- Occupations: Jurist & civil servant
- Spouse: Othila Helberg-Christensen
- Family: Andreas Schei (brother), Per Schei (father) and Johanne Schei (mother)

Nikolai Andreas Schei (9 May 1901 – 25 May 1985) was a Norwegian jurist and civil servant.

He was born in Førde as the son of Per Schei (1872–1960) and Johanne Schei (1874–1963). He was a brother of Andreas Schei, and through him an uncle of Chief Justice Tore Schei.

He took his examen artium in 1925, and took the cand.jur. degree in 1928. He also worked part-time as an assistant in the Ministry of Justice and the Police. He left in 1929, was a deputy judge in Sunnfjord for a short time before working for the counties of Møre og Romsdal from 1929 to 1931 and Oslo-Akershus from 1931 to 1934. In April 1933 he married Othilia Helberg Christensen (1901–1991), a daughter of Ingolf Elster Christensen. In 1934 he was appointed as inspector in a national arbitration institution, which was led by Carl Platou. In 1939 Schei was hired by the newly established Ministry of Provisioning. He was tasked to head the Directorate of Provisioning and Rationing.

In 1940, when Germany invaded Norway as part of World War II and the royal family and government of Norway fled the country, Schei was specifically asked to stay in Norway, where he continued as director of provisioning and rationing until 1945. As a civil servant Schei was one of the many people who worked throughout the war without being favoured by the new Nazi authorities. In addition, Schei was involved in the Norwegian resistance movement, as a clandestine member of Hjemmefrontens Ledelse. He was imprisoned briefly in Akershus Fortress in 1944, and also survived an assassination attempt. Similarly, Carl Platou also continued in his position, but was eventually imprisoned for secret resistance work. His father-in-law Ingolf Elster Christensen came to be the leader of the Administrative Council, which was abolished in September 1940.

In 1945, at the end of the war in Norway, Schei became acting Minister of Provisioning and Reconstruction (so-called "chief officer" of the Ministry), waiting for the exile Nygaardsvold government to return. As the normal state of affairs in Norway resumed, Schei was appointed County Governor of Sogn og Fjordane. He sat until his retirement in 1971.

He was also profiled nationally as chair of the so-called Schei Committee. The findings of the committee were highly influential; spurring a series of mergers and thus greatly reducing the number of municipalities in Norway. He was also a board member of the Directorate for Enemy Property, the industrial company Årdal Verk and the Nansen Academy, among others.

He was a Commander with Star of the Royal Norwegian Order of St. Olav, a Commander, First Class of the Danish Order of the Dannebrog and the Swedish Order of the Polar Star, and a Knight, Grand Knight's Cross with Star (Commander with Star) of the Icelandic Order of the Falcon. He died in May 1985 in Førde.

Government offices
Preceded by Konrad Sundlo (WWII occupation governor)	County Governor of Sogn og Fjordane; 1945–1971	Succeeded by Arne Ekeberg
