= Helene Fladmark =

Norwegian politician (born 1966)

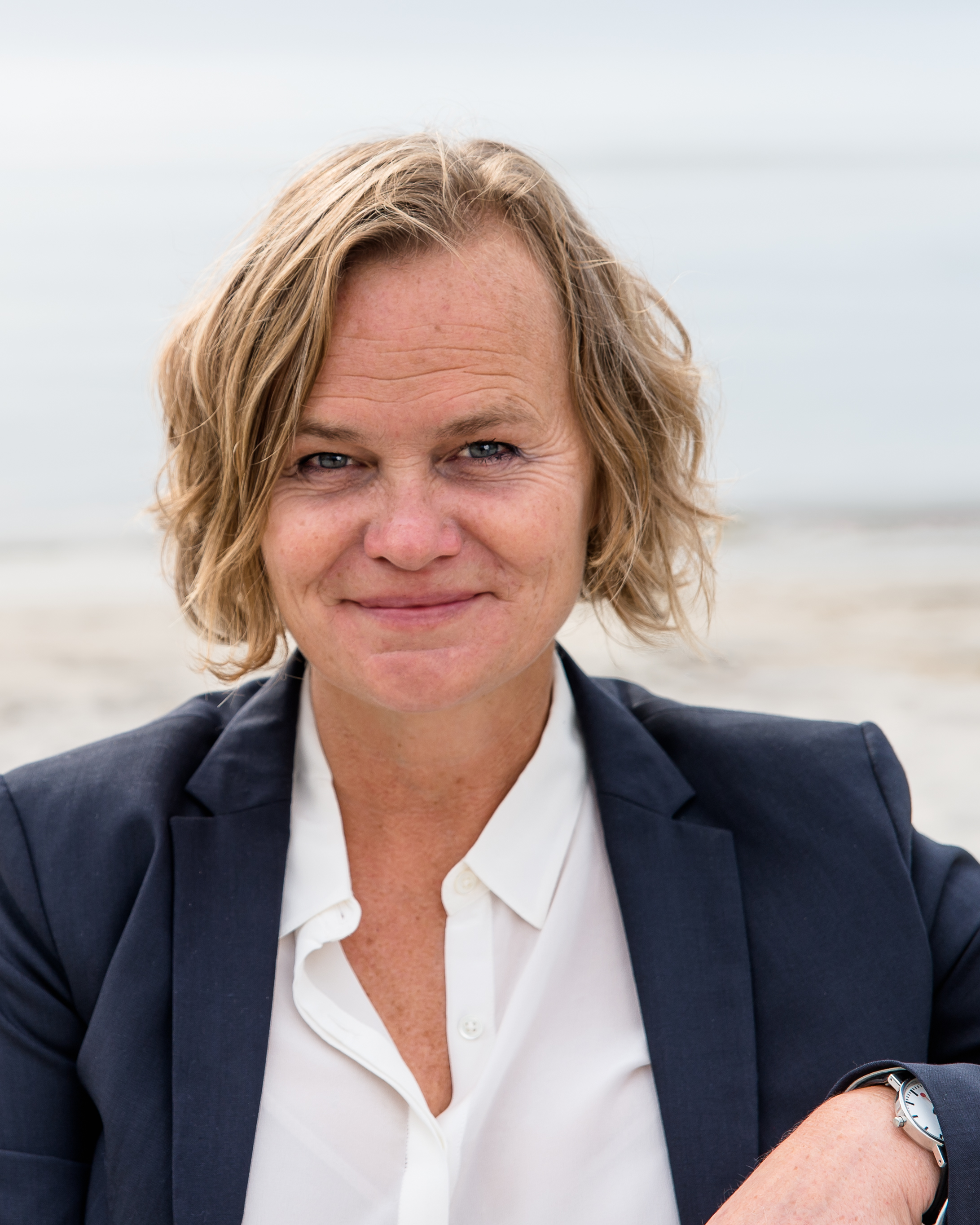
Helene Falch Fladmark

Helene Falch Fladmark (born 27 October 1966) is a Norwegian politician for the Liberal Party.

She served as a deputy representative to the Norwegian Parliament from Oslo during the term 1997–2001. From 1997 to 2000 she was a regular representative, covering for Odd Einar Dørum who was appointed to the first cabinet Bondevik.

Fladmark was born in Arendal, and graduated from the Norwegian University of Science and Technology as a sivilingeniør in 1992. Among other things, she has worked as editor in Kunnskapsforlaget from 1995 to 1999, advisor for international affairs in the Confederation of Norwegian Enterprise from 2001 to 2003 and director of societal policy in Tekna since 2007. She was deputy chair of the board of Statskog SF from 2005 to 2007.
