= Chief Justice of the Supreme Court of Norway =

Norwegian top judicial position

The chief justice of the Supreme Court of Norway (Norwegian Bokmål: Høyesterettsjustitiarius, Nynorsk: Høgsterettsjustitiarius) is the judicial leader of the Supreme Court of Norway.

The following is a chronological list of chief justices since the court was established:

- 1814–27: Johan Randulf Bull - Named in 1814, but the Supreme Court was formally established in 1815.
- 1827–30: Christian Magnus Falsen - Was only active a few weeks in the spring and summer of 1828 on account of illness.
- 1831–35: Jørgen Mandix
- 1836–54: Georg Jacob Bull
- 1855–73: Peder Carl Lasson
- 1874–77: Hans Gerhard Colbjørnsen Meldahl
- 1878–86: Iver Steen Thomle
- 1887–1900: Morten Diderik Emil Lambrechts
- 1900–08: Einar Løchen
- 1909–20: Karenus Kristofer Thinn
- 1920–29: Herman Scheel
- 1929–46: Paal Berg
- 1946–52: Emil Stang
- 1952–58: Sverre Grette
- 1958–69: Terje Wold
- 1969–84: Rolv Ryssdal
- 1984–91: Erling Sandene
- 1991–2002: Carsten Smith
- 2002–2016: Tore Schei
- 2016–: Toril Marie Øie
