= Nina Grieg =

Danish–Norwegian lyric soprano

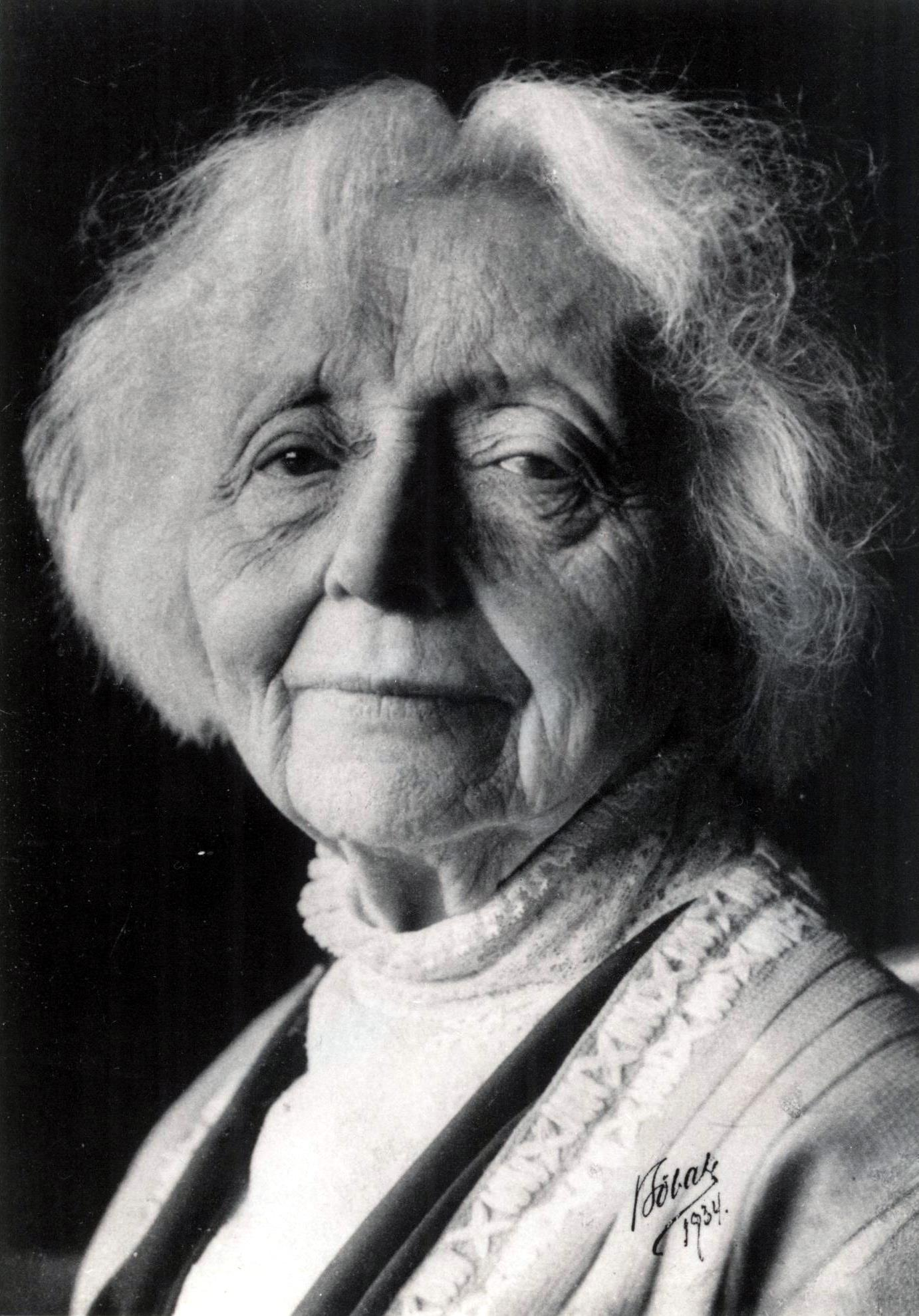
- Grieg c. 1934
- Born: Nina Hagerup; 24 November 1845; Bergen, Norway
- Died: 9 December 1935 (aged 90); Copenhagen, Denmark
- Occupation: Lyric soprano
- Spouse: Edvard Grieg (m. 1867)
- Children: 1
- Parent(s): Herman Didrik Hagerup (father); Adeline Werligh (mother)

Nina Grieg (née Hagerup; 24 November 1845 – 9 December 1935) was a Danish–Norwegian lyric soprano.

== Early life and family ==
Nina Hagerup was born in Bergen, Norway. Her parents were the malt inspector Herman Didrik Hagerup and the actress Luise Adeline Werligh, née Falck. She was the first cousin of composer Edvard Grieg, whom she married in 1867.

== Career ==
The couple often performed concerts together in Europe; on 6 December 1897, they performed some of his music at a private concert at Windsor Castle for Queen Victoria and her court. Her husband Edvard considered her the best performer of his songs, and her performances usually received rave reviews. However, one of Victoria's courtiers called her singing "passée".

She was featured as a soloist in Felix Mendelssohn's Elijah with Musikselskabet Harmonien (later known as the Bergen Philharmonic Orchestra) in 1866.

The English composer Frederick Delius dedicated two sets of songs to her in the years 1888–1890.

Nina Grieg never recorded professionally, but two amateur recordings made on wax cylinders have been preserved (in quite poor condition) and have been issued on the Simax label.

== Personal life and death ==
She married her first cousin, Norwegian composer Edvard Grieg, on 11 June 1867, in Copenhagen, Denmark. They were Unitarians.

After his death in 1907, she moved to Denmark. In Copenhagen, she attended a Unitarian church. She died in 1935 at the age of 90. She was cremated and her ashes were placed with her husband's ashes in a mountain tomb near Troldhaugen, outside Bergen, where the couple had shared a home for most of their married years.

== Literature ==
- Haavet, Inger Elisabeth (1998): Nina Grieg. Kunstner og kunstnerhustru. H. Aschehoug & Co. (W. Nygaard), Oslo. ISBN 82-03-22230-7. (Digital copy in Norwegian, available for Norwegian IP addresses only, at the Norwegian National Library's website.)

== See also ==
- List of coupled cousins
