= Wilhelm Frimann Koren Christie =

Norwegian politician (1778–1849)

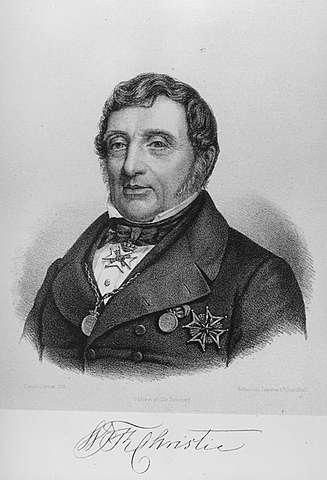
Wilhelm Frimann Koren Christie

Wilhelm Frimann Koren Christie (7 December 1778 – 10 October 1849) was a Norwegian attorney. He was a member of the National Assembly at Eidsvoll in 1814 and served as the Norwegian Constituent Assembly secretary.

== Background ==
Born in Kristiansund, Møre og Romsdal, Wilhelm F. K. Christie spent several childhood years in Bergen. He was the son of postmaster Johan Koren Christie (1745–1823) and Anne Thue Brodtkorb (1753–1834). His family can be traced back to Andrew Davidson Christie (ca. 1620-1694), born in Montrose, Scotland, who became a citizen of Bergen in 1654. At 10 years old, he was sent to attend Bergen Cathedral School. At 16 years old, he was a student at the University of Copenhagen. In 1799, he became candidat juridicum.

== Career ==
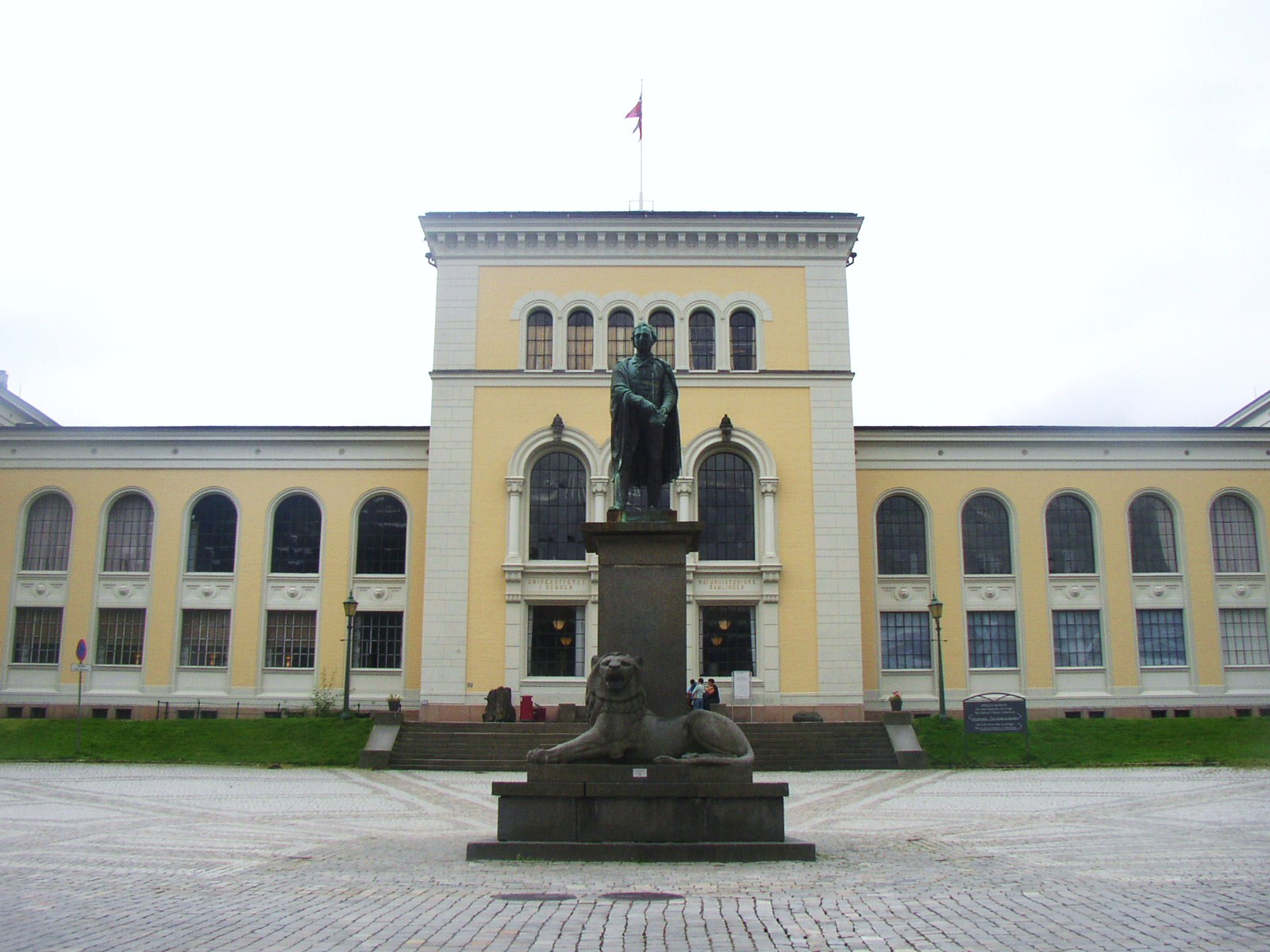
Statue of Wilhelm F. K. Christie at Bergen Museum

Wilhelm F. K. Christie was executive officer (kansellisekretær) and manager of a government office in Copenhagen. In 1809, at 30 years old, he became a judge (sorenskriver) in Søndre Bergenhus county. From 1815 to 1825, he was County Governor of Søndre Bergenhus amt and County Governor of Bergenhus stiftamt.

In 1814, he was a representative for Bergen at the Norwegian Constituent Assembly. He was chosen as the secretary during the whole period. Hence he did not play a very important role in the debates. Then he participated with sending a message to the United Kingdom from Christian Frederik in order to win assistance for Norway's independence. However, this message was never answered. In October, he became the president of the parliament and made an important contribution to the process of discussion of the union with Sweden. He stayed a representative in the Parliament of Norway (Stortinget) until 1825.

== Later years ==
From 1828 until his death, he was a customs inspector in Bergen. He was also a member of Bergen city council from 1837 to 1841, and participated with the founding of Bergen Savings Bank, of which he was chairman for several years.

== Legacy ==
Christie's private archive in the National Archives contains six packages of correspondence and notes. His statue now stands in front of the Bergen Museum, which he founded in 1825 and where he worked for more than 20 years. A statue of him by Norwegian sculptor Kristian Blystad was erected in 1989 in front of the Stortinget on the occasion of the Constitution's 175-year anniversary.

Political offices
Preceded by G. Sverdrup, C. Falsen, C. Diriks, J. Fabricius, D. Hegermann, P. Anker	President of the Storting; 1814-1818; Served alongside: V. Sibbern, C. Diriks, G. Sverdrup	Succeeded by I. Knudssøn, C. Tank, C. Falsen, A. Arntzen, V. Sibbern
Government offices
Preceded by Johan Randulf Bull	County Governor of Søndre Bergenhus amt 1815–1825	Succeeded by Christian Magnus Falsen
Preceded by Johan Randulf Bull	County Governor of Bergenhus stiftamt 1815–1825	Succeeded by Christian Magnus Falsen
