= Georg Jacob Bull =

Norwegian jurist and politician (1785–1854)

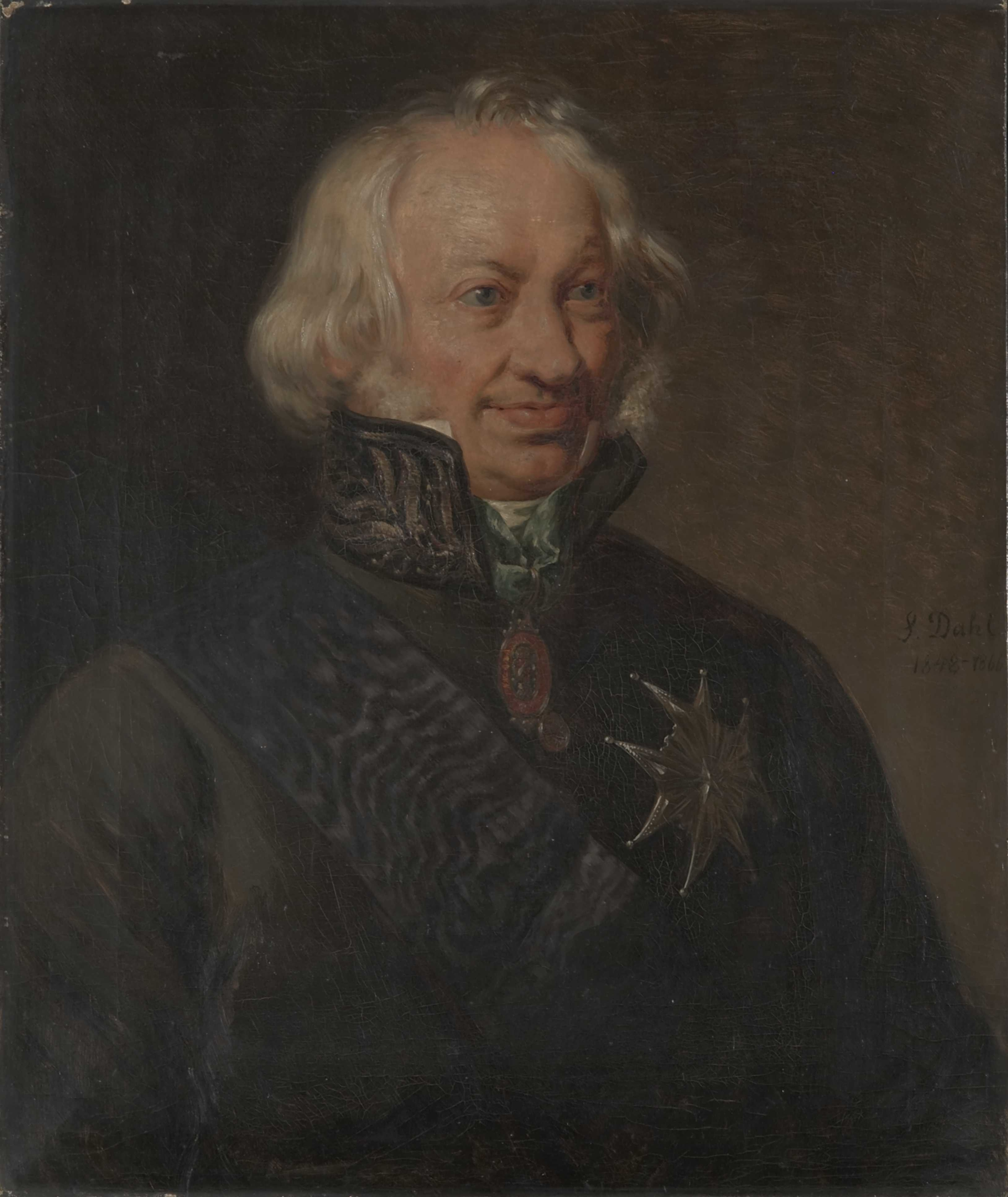
Georg Jacob Bull

Georg Jacob Bull (1 August 1785 – 12 December 1854) was a Norwegian jurist and politician born in Christiania, today Oslo.

He was a stipendiary magistrate (byfogd) of Bergen from 1810 to 1821. While stationed here, he was elected to the Norwegian Parliament for the year 1821. Bull was then appointed County Governor of Jarlsbergs og Laurvigs amt (today named Vestfold), serving from 1821 to 1829. Seated in Laurvik, he was elected to the Norwegian Parliament for the year 1824, representing the constituency of Laurvik og Sandefjord.

In 1829, he went on to serve as County Governor of Søndre Bergenhus amt (today named Hordaland). He left in 1834. From 1834 to 1836, he served as state secretary. He was then the fourth Chief Justice of the Supreme Court of Norway from 1836 to his death in 1854.

Georg Jacob Bull was the father of later government minister Anders Sandøe Ørsted Bull. His wife, and Anders' mother, was Barbara Albertine Ørsted, sister of Hans Christian Ørsted and Anders Sandøe Ørsted.

Government offices
New office Governed directly by Herman Wedel Jarlsberg, the Count of Jarlsberg	County Governor of Jarlsberg og Laurvig amt 1821–1829	Succeeded by Johan Henrik Rye
Preceded by Christian Magnus Falsen	County Governor of Søndre Bergenhus amt 1829–1831	Succeeded by Edvard Hagerup
Preceded by Christian Magnus Falsen	County Governor of Bergenhus stiftamt 1829–1834	Succeeded by Edvard Hagerup
Vacant	State Secretary; 1834–1836	Vacant
Legal offices
Preceded by Jørgen Mandix	Chief Justice of the Supreme Court of Norway	Succeeded by Peder Carl Lasson
