= Jørgen Erik Skeel =

Danish prime minister (1737–1795)

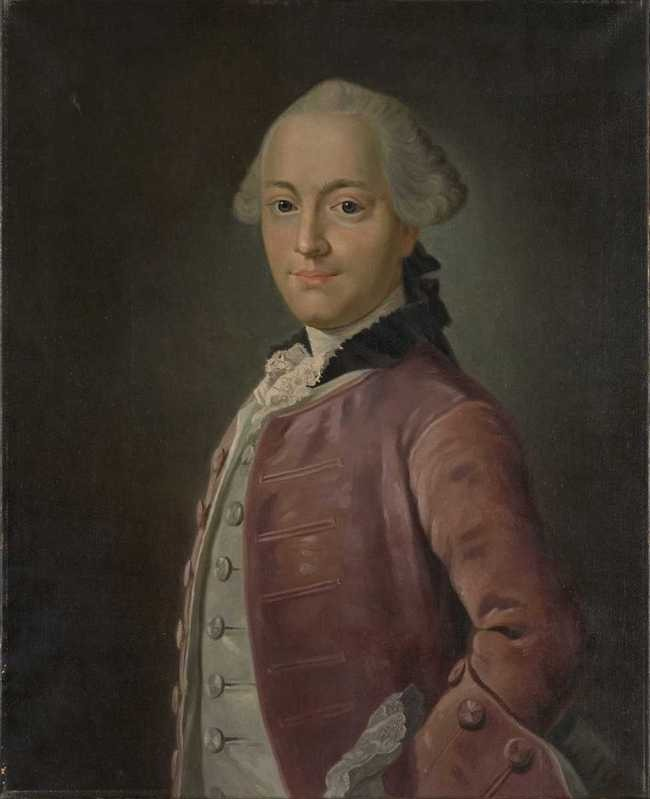
Jørgen Erik Skeel.

Jørgen Erik (Erich) Skeel (Scheel) (4 February 1737 – 11 January 1795) was a Danish court official who served as prime minister (geheimestatsminister) of Denmark-Norway from 1789 until his death in 1795. Prior to that, he had held a number of key positions in the country's financial administration. He had also served as governor of a number of counties and dioceses in Denmark and Norway, most notably as diocesan governor of Akershus. He had also served as one of the directors of the Danish Asiatic Company.

== Early life and education ==
Skeel was born at Nordborg Castle on Als, the son of Holger Skeel (1699–1764) and Regitze Skeel née Güldencrone (1706–79). His father served as county governor of Nordborg and Ærø, was later promoted to diocesan governor of Ribe and then to diocesan governor of Zealand and county governor of Roskilde. The father owned the estates Birkelse and Mullerup. The two estates were later passed down to Skeel's elder brothers Andreas Skeel and Frederik Christian Skeel. A third brother was Vilhelm Mathias Skeel. Jørgen Erik Skeel attended Sorø Academy.

== Career ==
Skeel started his career as an assistant in Rentekammeret. In 1755 he was appointed as hofjunker (court page). In 1758, he was promoted to kammerjunker. In 1760, he was also promoted to a more senior post (kommiteret) in Rentekammeret. In 1762, he was appointed as one of the directors of the Danish Asiatic Company. In 1766, he was sent to Norway as diocesan governor of Bergen and county governor of Søndre Bergenhus County. In 1768, he returned to Copenhagen to assume a post as 3rd councillor (3. deputeret) in the finance college (promoted to 2nd councillor in 1770). In 770, he was also appointed as one of the directors of the foundation Fonden ad usus publicos. He was also made a member of a number of commissions. One of them was tasked with solving a dispute with local residents of Bornholm in relation to the payment of extra taxes. The commission was sent to Bornholm on board the frigate HDMS Hvide Ørn (Capt. Peter Schiønning has provided a detailed account of the expedition in his diary). In 1771, when J. F. Struensees dismissed most of the central administration, Skeel was sent to Sønderjylland as county governor of Rønder County. After Struene's fall, he was reinstalled in his old posts as councillor in the finance college and as director of the Founded as usus publicus. He was also admitted to the Overskettedirektion. He was also part of the committee that was set up to handle the king's divorce.

After criticizing the new leaders, he was sent back to Sønderjylland, now as kanddrot in Pinneberg. In 1755, he was sent back to Norway to assume the post as diocesan governor of Akershus. He was also made a member of a commission set up to investigate complaints against the local government officials. In 1788, he returned to Copenhagen. Back in Copenhagen, Skeel was initially appointed President of the Supreme Court, only to be promoted to Prime Minister shortly after, before he had time to assume the former office. He was also appointed as 1st Councillor in Vestindisk-Guineiske Rente- og Generaltoldkammer. He was a member of a number of commissions. One of them was the commission regarding the abolition of the trans-Atlantic slave trade.

== Personal life ==
Skeel was married to Anna Dorothea von Ahlefeldt (1743–1805) on 30 August 1765. She was the daughter of Colonel Hans Heinrich von Ahlefeldt (1711–1765) and his wife, Frederikke Krag (1724–1756). Anna Dorothea acted as hofdame for Princess Louise. The pair had eight children, two sons and six daughters.

Skeel was a free mason of St. Martin's Lodge. He died unexpectedly on 11 January 1794. He is buried at Copenhagen's Assistens Cemetery.
