= Supreme Court of Norway =

Highest judicial body in Norway

- Bokmål: Høyesterett; Nynorsk: Høgsterett
- Interactive map of Supreme Court of Norway
- 59°54′51.63″N 10°44′40.19″E
- Established: 1815
- Jurisdiction: Norway
- Location: Oslo
- Coordinates: 59°54′51.63″N 10°44′40.19″E
- Authorised by: Constitution of Norway
- Number of positions: 20
- Website: www.domstol.no/hoyesterett

Chief Justice
- Currently: Toril Marie Øie
- Since: 2016

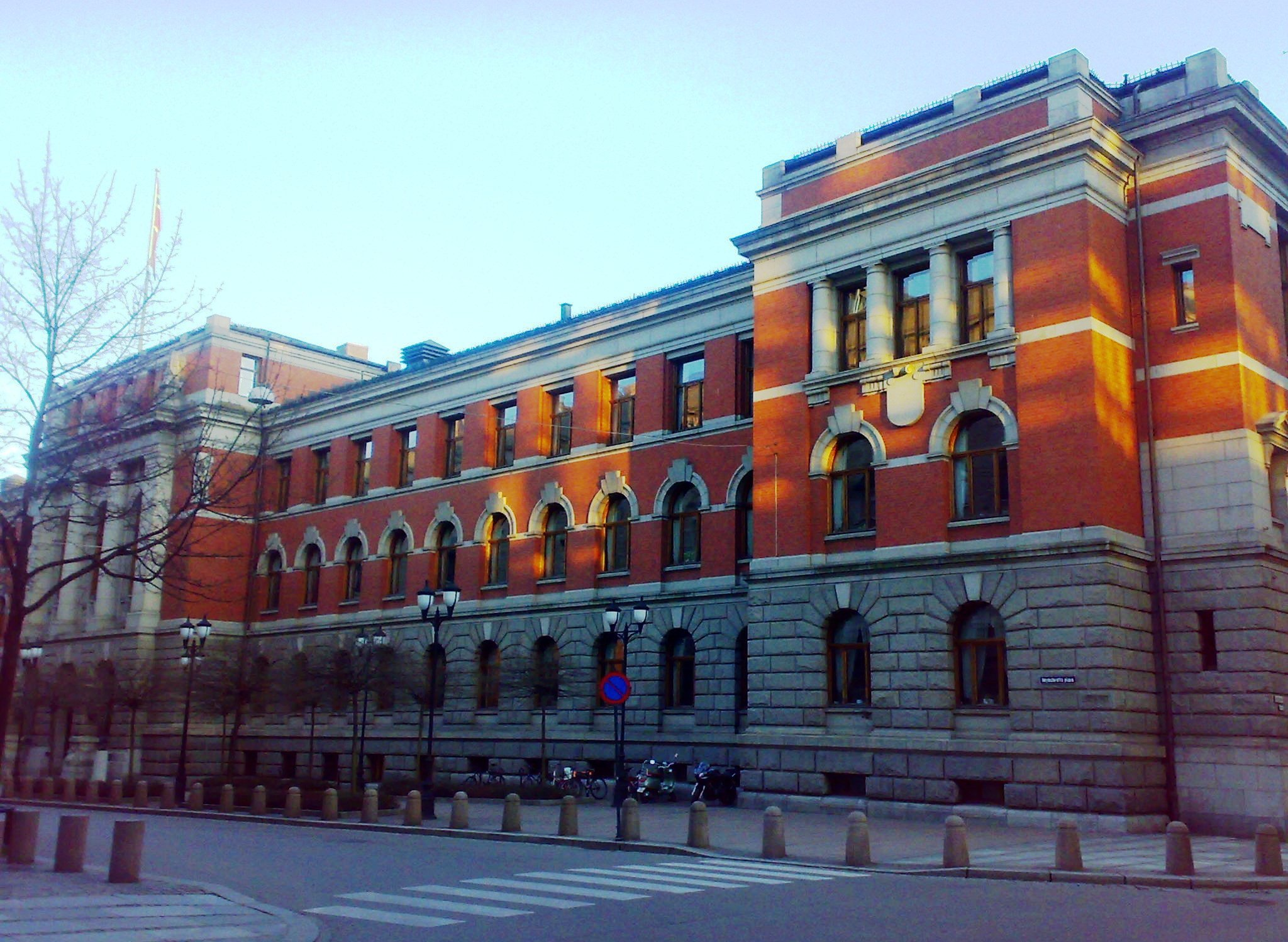
The Supreme Court building in Oslo

The Supreme Court of Norway (Norwegian Bokmål: (Norges) Høyesterett; Norwegian Nynorsk: (Noregs) Høgsterett; lit. 'Highest Court') is the highest court in the Norwegian judiciary. It was established in 1815 on the basis of section 88 in the Constitution of the Kingdom of Norway, which prescribed an independent judiciary. It is located in the capital Oslo. In addition to serving as the court of final appeal for civil and criminal cases, it can also rule whether the Cabinet has acted in accordance with Norwegian law and whether the Parliament has passed legislation consistent with the Constitution.

== Appointment process ==
Section 21 of the Norwegian Constitution grants the King of Norway sole authority to appoint judges to the Supreme Court. In Norwegian tradition, however, this section is interpreted as delegating the privilege to the Council of State, i.e. the cabinet. The cabinet makes their appointments on the advice of the Judicial Appointments Board, a body whose members are also appointed by the Council of State.

== Information ==
The Supreme Court is Norway's highest court. It has the entire Kingdom as its jurisdiction. It is a court of appeal, i.e. cases cannot be brought before the court if they have not been tried in a district court (Norwegian: tingrett) and in most cases also in a regional court (Norwegian: lagmannsrett). Nevertheless, the Supreme Court has the prerogative to decide itself which cases of appeal it shall hear. This leads the court to hear cases of principal importance, where clarification is needed or where standards need to be set. Rulings set substantial precedence for the lower courts as well as for the Supreme Court itself.

As a subject to Norwegian law, one has no right to be heard in the Supreme Court, as the universal Human Rights article on a fair trial is believed to be satisfied with the district courts and as courts of appeal the regional courts.

The Supreme Court has a committee consisting of three justices who decide what cases shall be tried in the Supreme Court. The same committee decides in procedural questions appealed from the lower courts. Once approved, the case is heard and decided by 5 justices. A case may be decided in grand chamber, set with 11 justices, if the court decides that clear precedence needs to be set. In rare circumstances, a case may be heard in plenary session by all 20 justices. This happens when the court needs to decide if legislation conflicts with the constitution or a case involves fundamental questions.

The court is chaired by a Chief Justice together with 19 other justices. The current Chief Justice is Toril Marie Øie.

To be eligible to apply for the position as a Supreme Court justice, the Constitution of Norway states that one must be a Norwegian citizen, have a law degree with excellent academic record and be at least 30 years old. Justice may only be removed by impeachment through conviction in the Riksrett. As of 2013, this has never happened. Justices face mandatory retirement at age 70.

The court's salary is regulated by the Storting. Since October 1, 2011, justices have been paid NOK 1,487,000 ($262,600) and the chief justice NOK 1,724,000 ($304,500).

== See also ==
- List of justices of the Supreme Court of Norway
- Appeals Selection Committee of the Supreme Court of Norway
