= Stockfleth family =

Stockfleth
- Nobility
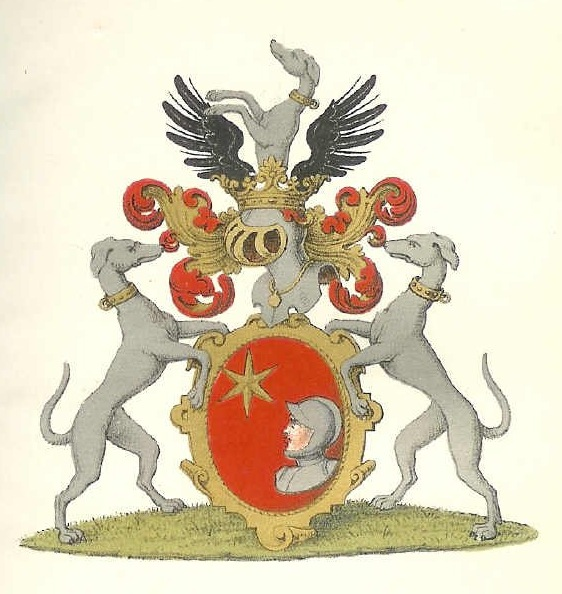
- Coat of arms of the Dano-Norwegian Stockfleth family
- Country: Denmark; Norway
- Origin: Haderslev
- Founded: 1600s 1779 (ennoblement)
- Founder: Eggert Stockfleth
- Titles: Bishop of Christiania; Fogd of Gudbrandsdalen; Fogd of Hadeland and Land; Alderman of Christiania; Mayor of Christiania
- Estate: Hval

The Stockfleth family (de Stockfleth or von Stockfleth) is a Dano-Norwegian noble family. Three branches of the family were naturalized as a part of the Danish nobility in 1779, based on a claim that the family had been noble since the time of King Valdemar III (1314–1364).

== History ==
The family descended from the merchant Eggert Stockfleth (died 1638), originally from Haderslev, Denmark, who moved with his family to Bragernes, Norway in 1629. According to an old unconfirmed tradition he was supposed to descend from an old noble family. Two other branches of the family had been recognized as noble in the Danish order of precedence since the early 17th century. Eggert Stockfleth was the father of the prominent brothers Henning, Jacob and Hans Stockfleth.

Henning Stockfleth (1610–1664) studied at the University of Wittenberg for three years before enrolling at the University of Copenhagen in 1635. He then held several official posts before he was appointed Bishop of Christiania (now Oslo) in 1646. He was the father of civil servant and diplomat, Christian Stockfleth.

Jacob Stockfleth (1607–1652) became the fogd (an old Norwegian title, kind of a combined sheriff and bailiff) of Gudbrandsdalen (from 1634) and then fogd of Hadeland and Land in Oppland (1642–1646). He lived at the farm Isum in what is now Sør-Fron Municipality for several years. He received Hval in Ringerike as a gift from king Christian IV in 1646. Near the end of his life, he became the alderman (rådmann) of Christiania (today Oslo).

Hans Stockfleth (ca. 1600–1664) was a businessman and land owner who served as the mayor of Christiania from 1643 until his death.

== Coat of arms ==
The coat of arms shows an oval red shield with a six-pointed gold star in the upper right corner and a man with a helmet in the lower left corner.

== See also ==
- Stockfleth (disambiguation)

== Other sources ==
- Thiset, Anders; Wittrup, P.L. (1904). Nyt dansk Adelslexikon. Copenhagen.
- Achem, Sven Tito (1973). Danske adelsvåbener. Copenhagen.
