= Stockfleth =

Stockfleth is a surname. It can refer to:

- Christian Stockfleth (1639–1704), Norwegian civil servant and diplomat
- Hans Stockfleth (1600s – 1664), Norwegian civil servant, businessman and investor
- Henning Stockfleth (c.1610 – 1664), Norwegian cleric and Bishop of Oslo
- Julius Stockfleth (1857–1935), German-born painter
- Nils Vibe Stockfleth (1787–1866), Norwegian cleric

== See also ==
- Stockfleth family, a Dano-Norwegian noble family
