= Hof, Vestfold =

Village in Holmestrand Municipality, Norway

Hof
- Village
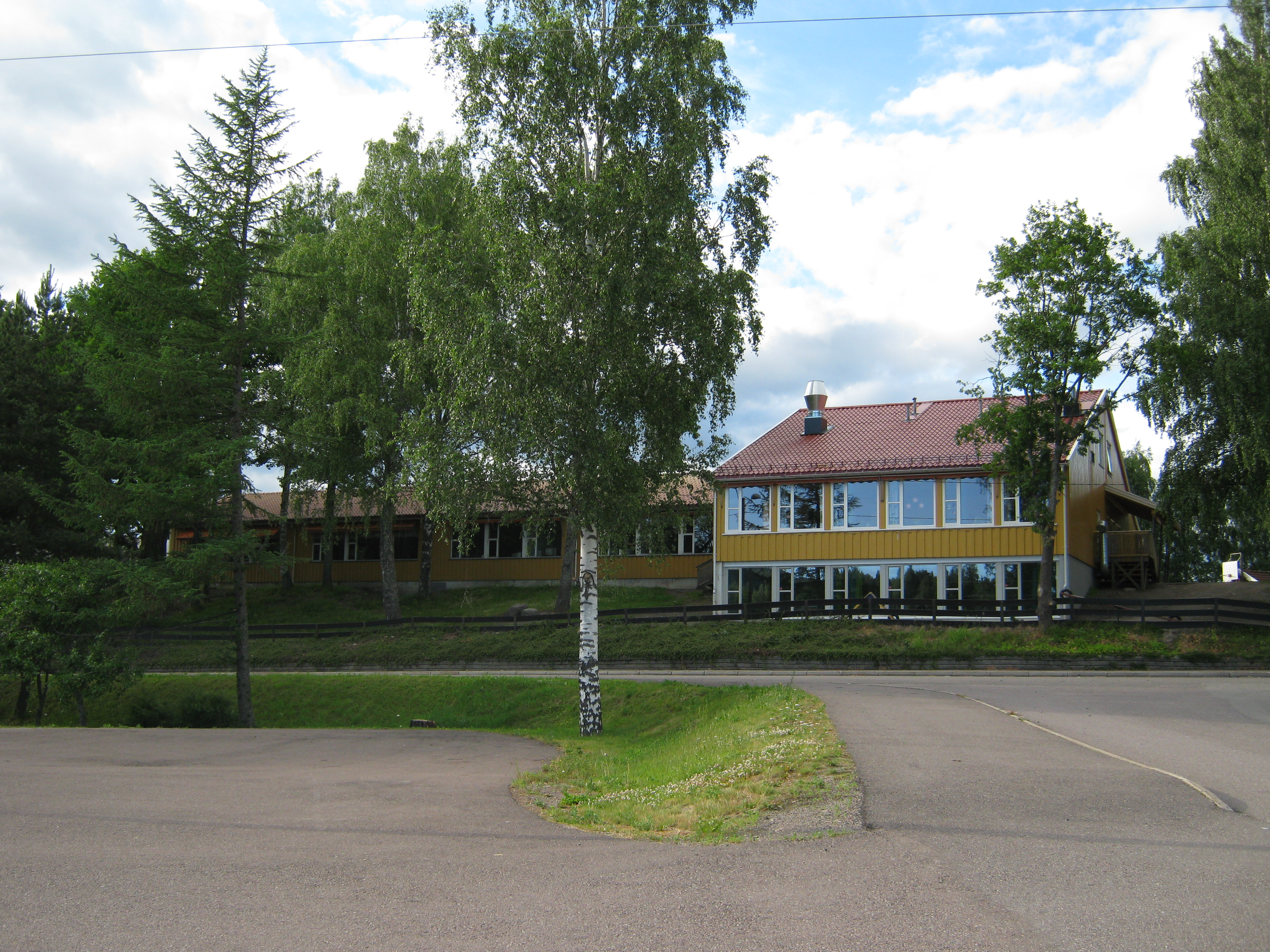
- View of the village school
- Interactive map of Hof
- Coordinates: 59.53034°N 10.08704°E
- Country: Norway
- Region: Eastern Norway
- County: Vestfold
- District: Jarlsberg
- Municipality: Holmestrand Municipality

Area
  - Total: 0.83 km^{2} (0.32 sq mi)
- Elevation: 77 m (253 ft)

Population (2026)
  - Total: 944
  - Density: 1,137/km^{2} (2,940/sq mi)
- Time zone: UTC+01:00 (CET)
  - Summer (DST): UTC+02:00 (CEST)
- Post Code: 3090 Hof

Hof is a village in Holmestrand Municipality in Vestfold county, Norway. The village is located about 14 kilometres (8.7 mi) northwest of the town of Holmestrand, about 10 kilometres (6.2 mi) southwest of the village of Sande i Vestfold, and about 8 kilometres (5.0 mi) south of the village of Eidsfoss. The smaller villages of Sundbyfoss and Hvittingfoss are both located a short distance south of Hof.

The 0.83-square-kilometre (210-acre) village has a population (2026) of 944 and a population density of 1,137 inhabitants per square kilometre (2,940/sq mi).

Hof Prison was located in the village until its closure in 2019.

== History ==
The village has a number of ancient burial mounds which testify to the fact that the village was relatively densely populated in ancient times. Eidsfos Verk was established as an ironworks at the end of the 17th century and had its heyday under Peder von Cappelen (1763–1837). On the company's property is a stately main building, Eidsfos Hovedgård, which was made into a historical landmark in 1923. The farm has a large park and unique workers' housing from the 18th century. In Hof, there is an ironworks museum that shows cultural and ironworks history.

The village of Hof served as the administrative centre of the old Hof Municipality from 1838 until 2018 when it became part of Holmestrand Municipality. The medieval Hof Church is located in the village.

=== Name ===
The village was named after the Hof prestegjeld. The prestegjeld was named after the old Hof farm (Old Norse: Hof) since the first Hof Church was built there. The name is identical with the word hof which means "pagan temple", a place for worshiping the old Norse Gods.
