= Jens Hermansen Juel =

Danish nobleman (1580–1634)

Jens Juel
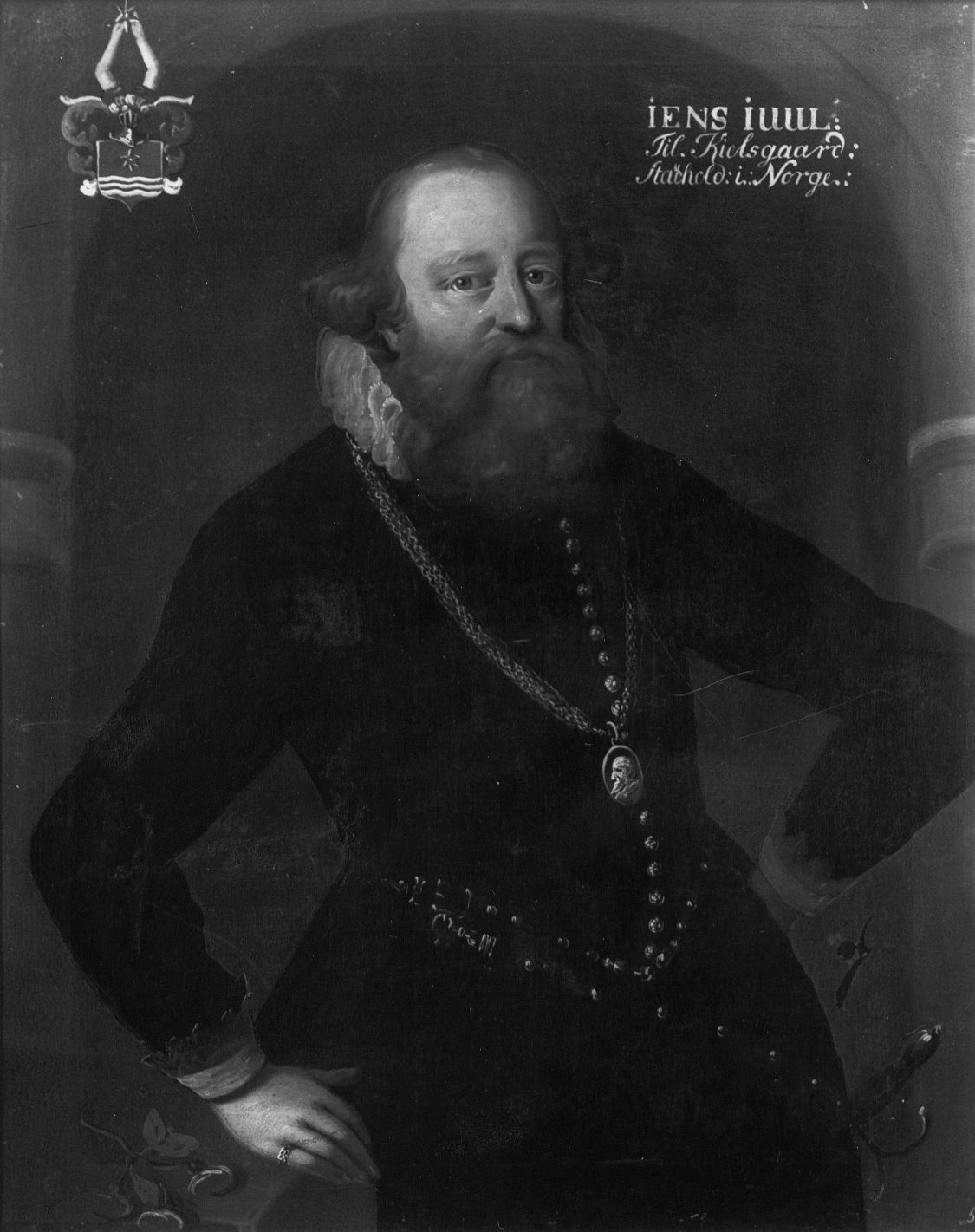

Governor-general of Norway
- In office 1618–1629
- Monarch: Christian IV
- Preceded by: Enevold Kruse
- Succeeded by: Christoffer Urne

Personal details
- Born: Jens Hermansen Juel; January 8, 1580 Refstrup, Denmark
- Died: March 26, 1634 (aged 54) Bøvling, Denmark

Jens Hermansen (Hermansson) Juel (8 January 1580 at Refstrup – died 26 March 1634 at Bøvling) was a Danish nobleman who served as Governor-general of Norway from 1618 to 1629.

== Early life and education ==
Juel was the son of Herman Juel (1548–1607) and Maren Juel. He attended the Sorø Academy from 1590 to 1596, and then had a seven-year educational trip with studies abroad, ending in 1603.

== Career ==
=== Early career in Copenhagen ===
Back in Denmark, Juel became employed at the Danish chancery. He advanced quickly, being given major tasks: Royal Treasurer (responsible for accounting, payment and collection of customs duties and taxes, as well as management of state property, including forests, roads and buildings) beginning in 1609, member of the Danish national council from 1616 and assignment to serve on several diplomatic missions.

=== Governor-general of Norway ===
In 1618, he was named Governor-general of Norway which included the traditional role as feudal lord to Akershus in Norway. Juel proved to be an energetic and active governor, both on the Crown’s and on his own behalf. King Christian IV was occupied with the Thirty Years' War which left Juel with substantial latitude to apply his own judgment. He enacted a garrison tax in 1627, which financed the manning of fortresses at Akershus, Båhus, Bergen and Trondheim, and served as the foundation of an independent Norwegian defense organization, based on a strengthened peasant militia. A similar attempt at developing Norwegian naval strength was, however, rejected by the king.

As feudal lord of Akershus, Juel established the "new city" of Christiania when Oslo burnt in 1624 (the old city was moved closer to Akershus Castle and renamed Christiania). The "new city" became a relatively Danish-dominated city, serving as refuge for a network of immigrant merchants, especially from Haderslev, Denmark, which was destroyed by war in 1627. These included Johan Garmann, Niels Toller and Hans Stockfleth.

== Property ==
Juel's holding's in Denmark included Kjeldgård on the Salling peninsula in western Jutland. In 1626, he also acquired Nørre Vosborgnear Holstebro.

During his years in Norway, Hyel actively expanded mining operations in Norway, and served as the first director of the Kongsberg Silver Mines. The Silver Works was originally a 100% state-owned enterprise, but financial difficulties resulting from the Danish-Norwegian intervention in the Thirty Years' War, resulted in sale of shares to a private company in 1628, with the state as one of the part-owners. Juel was head of the private partnership that bought a share of the silver mine.

Juel was also active in husbanding his private wealth through lending while he served in Oslo, gaining ownership of a number of Norwegian estates.

== Personal life ==
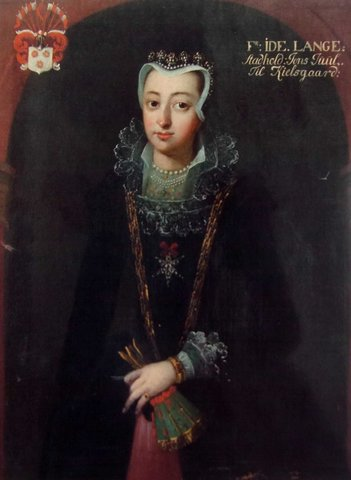
Ida Juelm née Lange.

On 13 May 1610 in Viborg, Denmark, he married Ide Lange (1584–1649), the daughter of Hans Gundesen Lange (1542-1609) and Johanne Pedersdatter Skram (1535-1620). Juel and Ide Hansdatter Lange had a daughter, Christence Juel, who was born on 12 August 1637. She married Jørgen Rosenkrantz (born 1607).
