= Ladegården =

Ladegården may refer to:

- Ladegården, Copenhagen, a former farm and building complex from 1623 to 1920 in Copenhagen, Denmark
- Oslo Ladegård, a manor house situated at Gamlebyen in Oslo, Norway
- Ladegården, Bergen, a neighborhood in the borough of Bergenhus, Bergen, Norway
