= Caspar Herman Hausmann =

Danish-Norwegian General, lumber merchant and squire

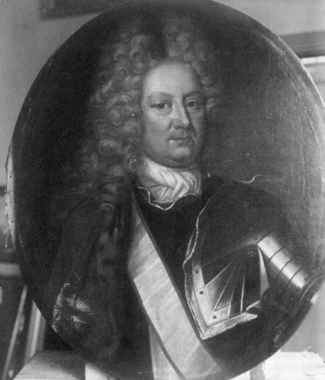
- Caspar Herman Hausmann
- Born: 1653; Segeberg, Holsten (now Holstein
- Died: 1718 (aged 64–65) Christiania, Norway
- Allegiance: Denmark-Norway
- Service years: 1675–1716
- Rank: Commander-in-Chief Norwegian Army

Caspar Herman Hausmann was a Danish-Norwegian General, lumber merchant and squire. He was born 10 January 1653 at Segeberg in the Danish duchy of Holsten (now Holstein), which was then in union with Denmark-Norway. He died 9 September 1718 in Christiania (now Oslo) and lies in a crypt in Oslo Cathedral. He was married to Karen Nielsdatter Toller (1662–1742). He was a half-brother by Margaret Pape with Ulrik Frederik Gyldenløve (1638–1704) — Gyldenløve was King Frederick III of Denmark's acknowledged illegitimate son and Statholder (viceroy) to Norway from 1664 until 1699.

== Military service ==
Hausmann participated as a Danish officer in the Scanian War from 1675 to 1679 and was promoted to lieutenant colonel in 1678. He was wounded in the capture of Rügen (then part of Swedish Pomerania) in 1678. He was appointed commander of Apen in the County of Oldenburg in 1679.

In 1680 he was transferred to Norway to aid in the troop buildup there, and placed in command of the Akershusiske national infantry regiment. He was promoted to colonel in 1681. His promotions continued – to Brigadier 1696, major general in 1703 and lieutenant general and the military member of the Slottsloven at Akershus in 1711.

In 1711 a Norwegian Army was raised to invade and recapture the former Norwegian province of Bohuslen under the leadership of Lieutenant General Caspar Hausmann. In parallel a strong fleet was to provide protection and transportation to seaward; Frederick IV committed to providing such a force under Vice Admiral Sehested in June 1711. In August, the Norwegian army marched into Bohuslen. But by late summer Vice Admiral Sehested's fleet had not appeared offshore, having been ordered by Frederick IV to return to Baltic waters. Without naval support, the Norwegian Army was forced to return to Norway.

In April 1712 during the Great Northern War he was promoted to commander-in-chief (the commanding General) of the Army in Norway; he served in this position until January 1716. Gjerset indicates that, "General Hausmann, the commander-in-chief of the army, and the military member of the Slottsloven, who had proven himself both able and conscientious, and had brought the army into a high state of readiness, was dismissed shortly before the war (combat in Norway) broke out because the government feared lest his warlike spirit should lead him to act with too much haste." The Norwegian army, which he played an instrumental role in building, successfully repelled Swedish campaigns in both 1716 and 1718.

=== Awards ===
Hausmann was awarded a knighthood in the Order of the Dannebrog 1709 and received the title geheimeråd (one of the King's circle of closest advisers) in 1716.

== Personal life ==
Hausmann was married to Karen Toller; Hausmann's father-in-law, Niels Toller, owned substantial property in Norway including a number of sawmills, and his mother-in-law was the daughter of the assessor and broker Anders Madsen in Tønsberg. Thus, as a result of marriage, Hausmann gained control of substantial property. Via his wife, he inherited the Old Bishop's Palace (or Oslo Ladegaard) in the Old Town of Oslo. Here he lived until his death. As the holder of Oslo Ladegaard he also had control over most of the land in the Old Town. Another acquisition through the marriage was of the Frogner Manor, which after his death went to his daughter Karen, who married to Frederik Christopher de Cicignon. Hausmann also established the iron works Eidsfos Verk in 1697.

During the expansionary period for Norwegian shipping from 1690 through 1710 Haussmann established himself among the leading ship owners in Christiania. In 1704 and 1705, he was the city's largest shipowner and the fourth largest lumber exporter. He owned the large Bingen log booms on the Glomma river in Sørum and controlled much of the timber supply to Christiania. He exported his own lumber on his own ships and imported salt, wine and liquor. It has been suggested that he also participated in the lucrative – but risky – trade in contraband goods during the war.

His only son, Frederik Ferdinand Hausmann (1693–1757), married Cathrine Helvig Werenskiold (1702–1749). The union was childless and the Hausmann line died with Frederik.
