= Jørgen Müller =

Dano-Norwegian government official (1648–1695)

Governor of Nedenæs amt
- In office 1681–1691

Personal details
- Born: c. 1648 Copenhagen, Norway
- Died: c. 1695
- Citizenship: Denmark-Norway

Jørgen Müller (1648–1695) was a Dano-Norwegian government official. He served as the County Governor of Nedenæs county from 1681 until 1691. He was born in Copenhagen, Denmark in 1648 to Henrik Müller and Sophie Hansdatter. In 1682, he married Karen Henningsdatter Pogwisch, the daughter of Henning Pogwisch.

Government offices
| Preceded by Jens Toller Rosenheim | County Governor of Nedenæs amt 1681–1691 | Succeeded by Claus Røyem (Acting for Christian Stockfleth) |
