= Johan Garmann =

Danish-born Norwegian merchant and settler

- Born: 1583; Haderslev, Duchy of Schleswig, Denmark-Norway
- Died: February 7, 1651 (aged 67–68); Kongsberg, Norway
- Occupations: Merchant, alderman
- Employer: Kongsberg Silver Mines
- Spouse: Boel Reiminch (m. 1608)
- Children: Annechen Garmann; Johan Garmann (the Younger); Herman Johansen Garmann

Johan Garmann (formerly Gaarmann), called "the Elder", (1583 – 7 February 1651) was a Danish-born merchant, alderman, royal factor, and early prominent settler in Norway during the seventeenth century.

Originating from Haderslev, in what was then part of the Duchy of Schleswig (under the Danish crown), Garmann was compelled to leave his home due to the turmoil of the Thirty Years’ War. After a temporary stay in Malmö, he received royal permission to travel to Christiania (now Oslo), then part of the Danish-Norwegian realm, where he established himself as a leading figure in trade, provisioning, and administration associated with the emergent Kongsberg Silver Mines.

He became relatively wealthy, and founded a family line in Norway, known as the Garmann family (derived from the Danish word for farmer; Danish: gaarmand), which came to enjoy considerable social standing and influence within the country's mercantile and administrative circles. His firstborn son, also named Johan Garmann (the Younger), became the first Land Commissioner of Norway, when Frederick III created a treasury for Norway in 1661. His second born, Hermann Garmann, became Inspector-General of Customs, magistrate president, and commercial director in Bergen.

Although several earlier encyclopedias and literary works have suggested that he was the illegitimate son of Frederick II of Denmark, these claims are unsubstantiated and lack credible historical verification.

== Biography ==
=== Early life ===
Garmann was born in 1583 in Haderslev, a commercial town in the Duchy of Schleswig (under the Danish crown). A burgher, by the early seventeenth century, he had established himself as a substantial merchant in his hometown. Records suggest that he operated a trading house on the castle grounds and market square in Haderslev prior to 1622. From 1626, he became an alderman (Danish: rådmand) of Haderslev. He married Boel Reiminch of Kolding in ca. 1608, and they had several children. His son Herman attended school in Hamburg and served with a merchant in Lübeck, and later with the customs officer in Øresund. Garmann must therefore have had many connections to the trading circles of Denmark and northern Germany.

Despite his evidently successful mercantile endeavours, Garmann's circumstances — and those of countless others — were increasingly shaped by the turbulence of the Thirty Years’ War (1618–1648). In 1627, forces under Imperial supreme commander Albrecht von Wallenstein entered Danish territory, causing widespread unrest. In the wake of these conflicts, Garmann left Haderslev and initially took refuge in Malmö. On 10 January 1628, he secured a royal “leidebrev” (safe passage) from King Christian IV permitting him — accompanied by his wife, children, and brother-in-law, along with a ship and goods— to move to Christiania (Oslo) or elsewhere in Norway.

=== Immigration to Norway ===
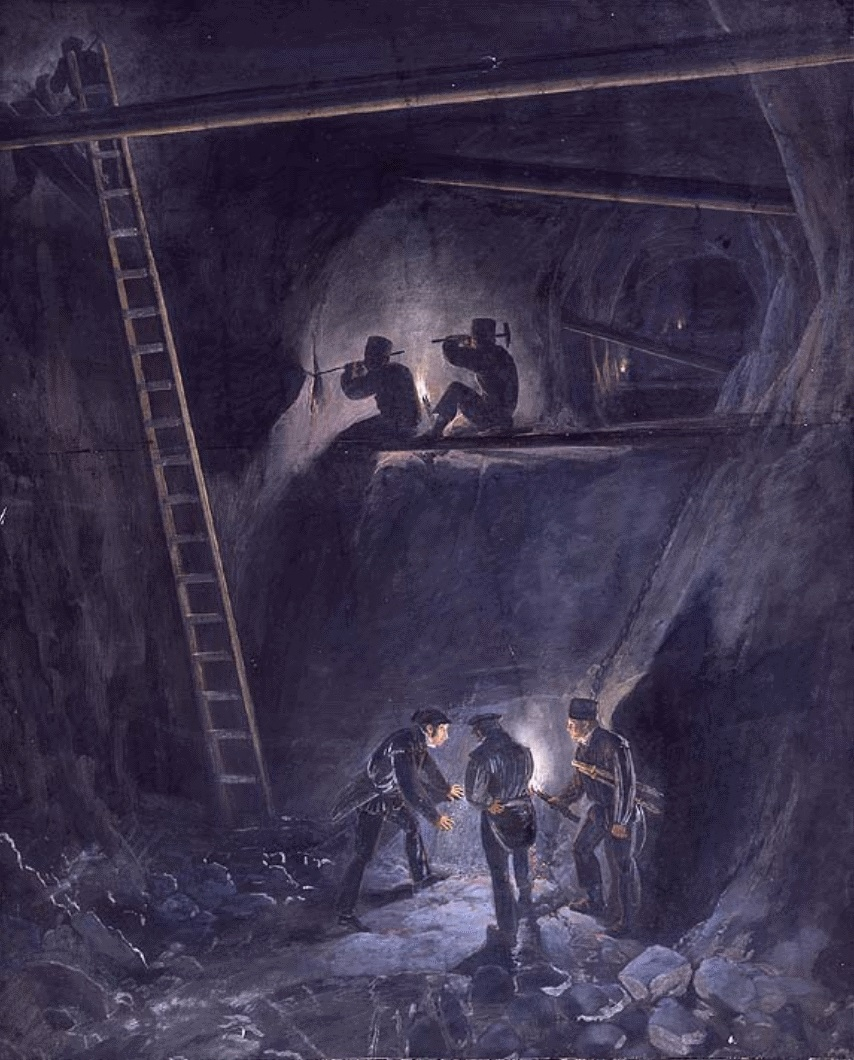
The Kongsberg Silver Mines, where Garmann was a factor, shareholder and commercial stakeholder. Painting from 1834 by Johannes Flintoe.

Garmann immigrated as part of a larger community of affluent and enterprising Southern Jutland families who settled in Oslo. Shortly after arriving, Garmann acquired citizenship (borgerskap) in Christiania. Nevertheless, he chose to reside and develop his enterprises at Bragernes, an area across the Drammenselva river from Strømsø, and a growing commercial district positioned advantageously for trade and resource acquisition. Garmann quickly became affiliated with the Governor-general of Norway, Jens Hermansson Juel, who secured him major trade contracts with the Crown and Kongsberg Silverworks.

According to Hannibal Sehested’s records, Garmann held leases on several substantial parcels of land situated above Bragernes Church. In the immediate vicinity, various members of his close family also leased property.

=== Kongsberg Silver Mines and other commercial activities ===
At the time of Garmann's immigration to Oslo, the Kongsberg Silver Mines at Kongsberg in Buskerud county, constituted the largest mining field in Norway, was undergoing rapid expansion following its discovery in 1623. Not long after his arrival, he was appointed as the factor of the Silver Company and royal provisioner (providiteur) of the Silver Mines. This position required him to oversee and ensure the delivery of materials, provisions, and equipment necessary for the mines’ operations, as well as to support the workforce engaged in silver extraction.

He accumulated a considerable fortune by the standards of the time, and much of it was secured in silver. In later accounts of the silver mines, it is evident that Garmann is recognised as one of the ‘big customers’. He is recorded in the sales lists with a total of 45 lots with 4.7 kg of silver, the 5th largest buyer overall (the largest was Christian IV).

By the early 1630s, Garmann had entered the networks of merchants (among them Niels Toller) and suppliers granted contracts with state authorities, military fortifications, and other public projects. Records indicate that as early as 1630, he provided gunpowder and lead to Akershus Fortress, a key royal fortress in the region. In 1638, he again delivered gunpowder, followed in 1639 and 1640 by the provision of timber and firewood (Danish: deler og brændeved) to meet the needs of the authorities. By 1645, Garmann was tasked with supplying masts and beams for royal construction or maintenance projects. In 1649, he furnished provisions for the royal ships. He pursued the timber trade both independently and in partnership with his fellow Haderslev native, Hans Eggertsen Stockfleth. Together, Garmann and Eggertsen were involved in founding the Hassel Iron Works (Danish: Hassel Jernværk) at Modum, each holding a quarter share.

== Marriage and progeny ==
Johan Garmann married Boel Hermansdatter Reiminch (d. 12 February 1657), daughter of Herman Reiminc, an apothecary in Kolding by his wife Margrethe Wilhelmsdatter Schumacher. They reportedly had seven children:

- Annechen ‘Anna’ Garmann (b. ca. 1605), married in 1630 to Frederik Bøyesen of Foss (d. 1679), forest inspector and manager of the King's Mill.
- Johan Garmann "the Younger" (ca. 1608–1673), first land commissioner of Norway, diocesan warden and customs officer in Oslo, later castle clerk at Akershus. Married 1640 to Maren Willumsdatter Dop (1620–1654), married 1661 to Margrethe Jespersdatter.
- Willum Garmann (d. 1644), bailiff in Akers bailiwick later bailiff in Buskerud and Hallingdal bailiwick, married Lene Jørgensdatter.
- Herman Garmann (1612–1674), Inspector-General of Customs, magistrate president, and commercial director in Bergen, married 1636 to Margrethe Buch (1618–1669), married 1671 to Catharine Munthe (ca. 1628–1674).
- Bernt Garmann (1620–1656), parish priest in Gran, married Anna Knudsdatter (no children).
- Elisabeth Garmann (ca. 1620–1686), married 1648 to Johan Garmann (the Elder)'s successor as factor at Kongsberg Silver Mines, Johan Reinholtzen Hass (d. 1663).
- Anna Catharina Garmann, married doctor in Bergen later medical officer of health (Norwegian: Stadsmedicus) in Trondheim, Didrik Eckhoff (d. 1675).

== Supposed royal parentage ==
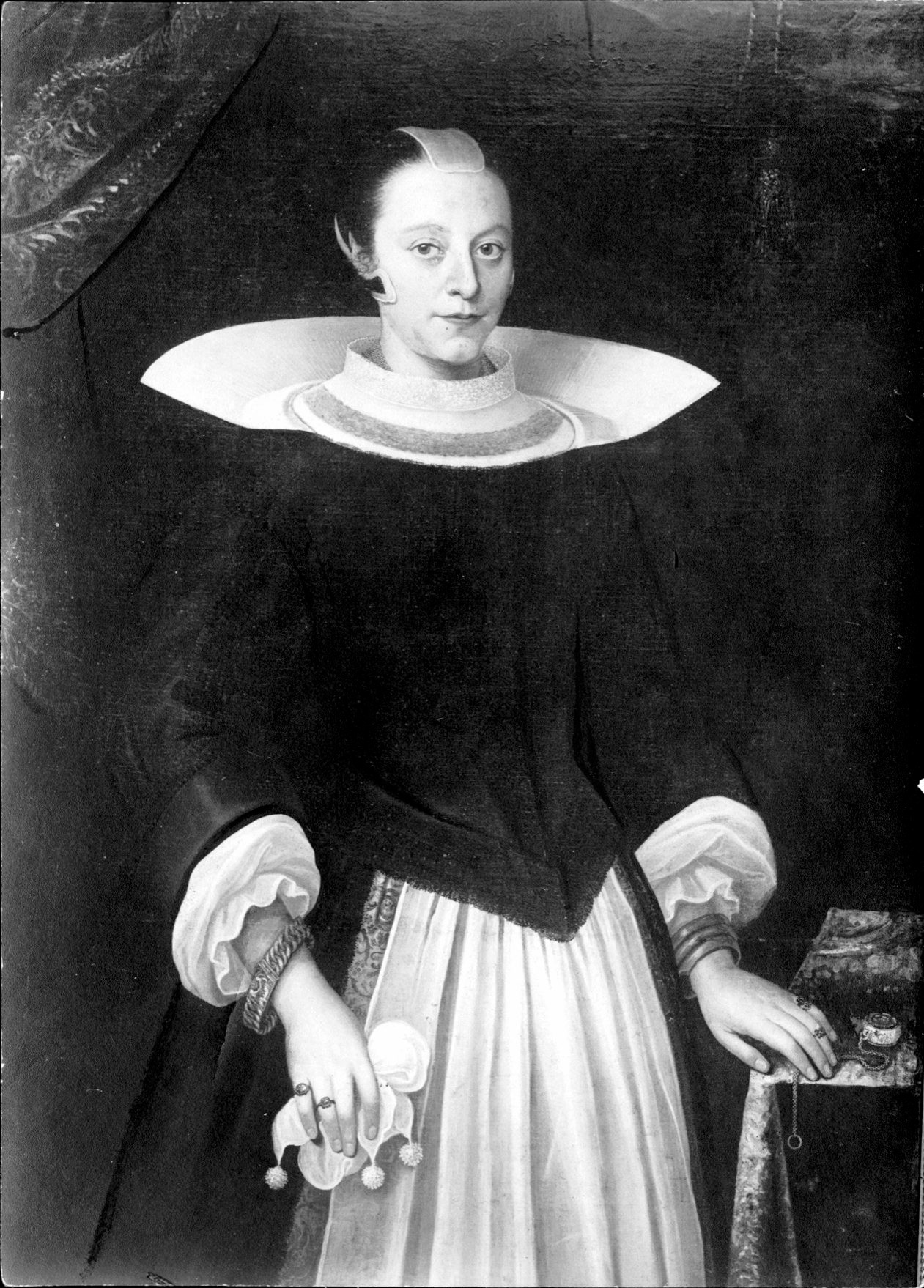
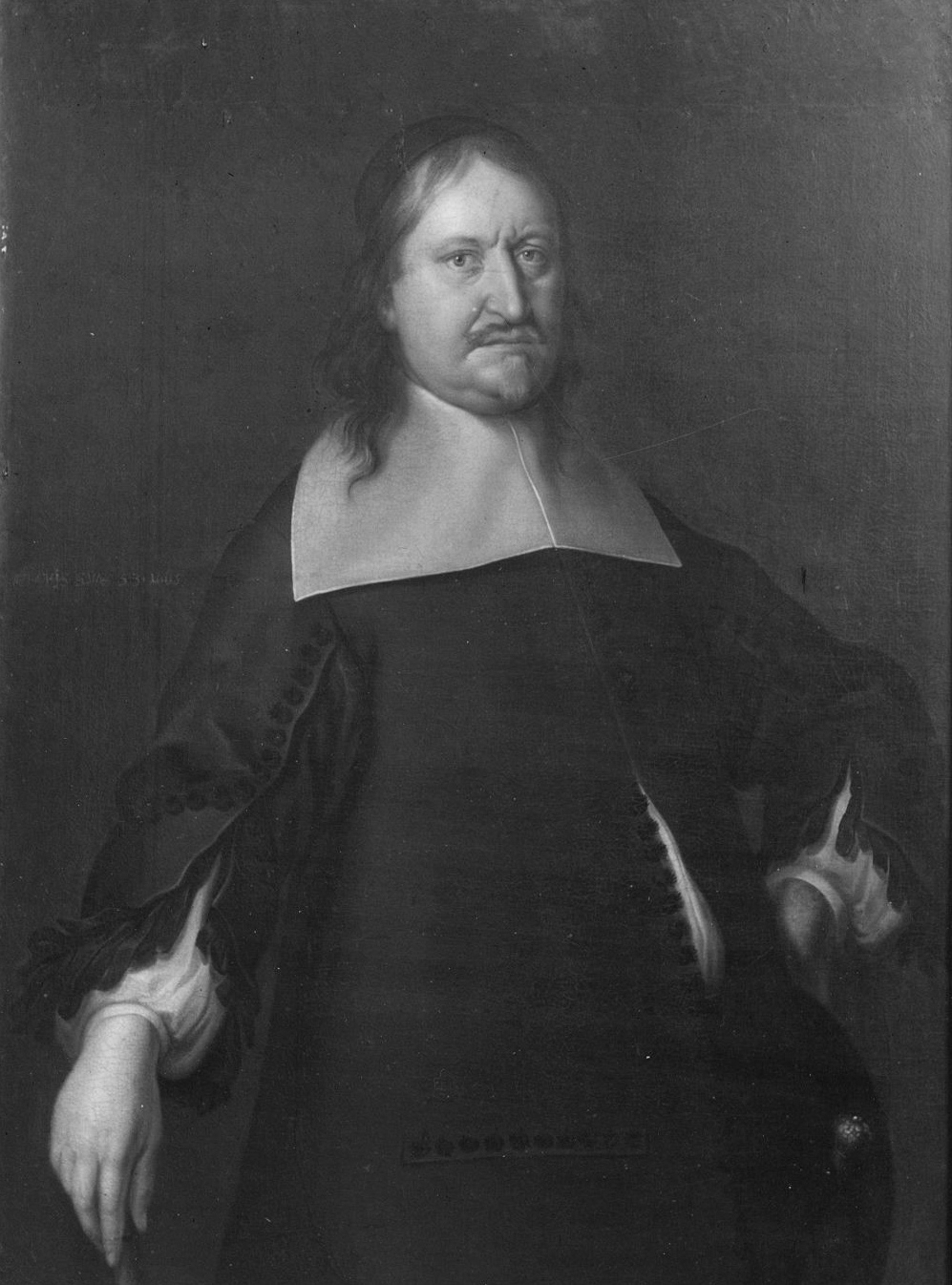
The two portraits at the heart of the apocryphal story. Margrethe "med Hanken" Stoud (left), the reputed mistress to either Frederick II or his son Chrisitan IV, and Herman Garmann (right), whose resemblance to Christian was considered "striking".

A recurring, though unsubstantiated, tradition holds that Johan Garmann was the illegitimate son of Frederick II, King of Denmark-Norway, and thus a half-brother of Chrisitan IV. Variations of this claim appeared in several printed sources, including editions of the Aschehoug and Gyldendal's Great Norwegian Encyclopedia from before 1969 through the early 1990s, as well as in genealogical literature. One of the earliest identified references to this account can be traced to a genealogical compilation published by Anna Juliane Hopstock in 1876, which included the Garmann family among a number of other interconnected lineages.

=== Magdalene med Hanken ===
Central to this tradition is the tale of Magdalene (or Margrethe) "med Hanken", a reputedly beautiful woman depicted in a portrait once owned by David Brunchorst Garmann at the Mjelde estate, south of Bergen. According to family lore, Magdalene was morganatically wed (Danish: til venstre hånd) to one of the Frederick Danish-Norwegian kings, receiving considerable estates, such as Sandviken and Damsgård, and bearing a son who became the progenitor of the Garmann lineage.

With reference to Norwegian clergyman Hans Strøm, historian B. E. Bendixen has identified the woman in the portrait as Margrethe Rasmusdatter Stoud, a wealthy landowner whose descendants married into the Garmann family. According to Strøm, the phrase “med hanken” originally referred to Margrethe's residence on Hankø, expressed as “i Hanken.” Over time, this evolved into “med hanken,” likely due to confusion with the distinctive handle-shaped hairpin depicted in her portrait. Art historian Einar Lexow claims that Margrethe was a mistress of Christian IV (who was known to favour extramarital relations), and that their illegitimate child was Johan's son, Herman Garmann, rather than Johan himself. The legend is said to have gained traction due to a perceived resemblance between members of the Garmann family and the House of Oldenburg, particularly Herman Garmann's supposed likeness to Christian IV. Bendixen, however, rejects both accounts as unfounded, though he acknowledges that Herman's striking resemblance to the king may have inspired such stories.
