= Niels Toller =

Danish merchant (1592–1642)

Niels Toller (1592 – 8 January 1642) was a Danish-born merchant who settled in Norway and became the wealthiest person in Christiania.

== Biography ==
Niels Toller was born in Haderslev, in Southern Jutland, Denmark. He first arrived in Norway in 1620 and quickly began to establish itself as a businessman, and received citizenship in 1621. He became part of a network of enterprising merchants from Haderslev, which also included Hans Stockfleth and Johan Garmann. After a devastating fire in 1624, King Christian IV ordered the old city of Oslo to be moved closer to the fortification of Akershus Castle and also renamed it to Christiania. Niels Toller achieved monopoly on the trade in Old Oslo, and had favourable agreements with the Crown's sawmills along Akerselva. In time, he operated a shipping and lumber export business. He also owned two of the 32 shares of the Kongsberg Silver Mines. He owned the site of Oslo Ladegård and from 1629 he served as Mayor of Christiania.

Niels Toller, d.e. (the elder) was the father of Niels Toller, d.y. (the younger) (c.1624–1676) who served as assessor for Overhoffretten, the highest court in Norway from 1667 to 1797. His grandchildren included Karen Toller (1662–1742).
