= Christine Marie von Cappelen =

Norwegian botanist (1766–1849)

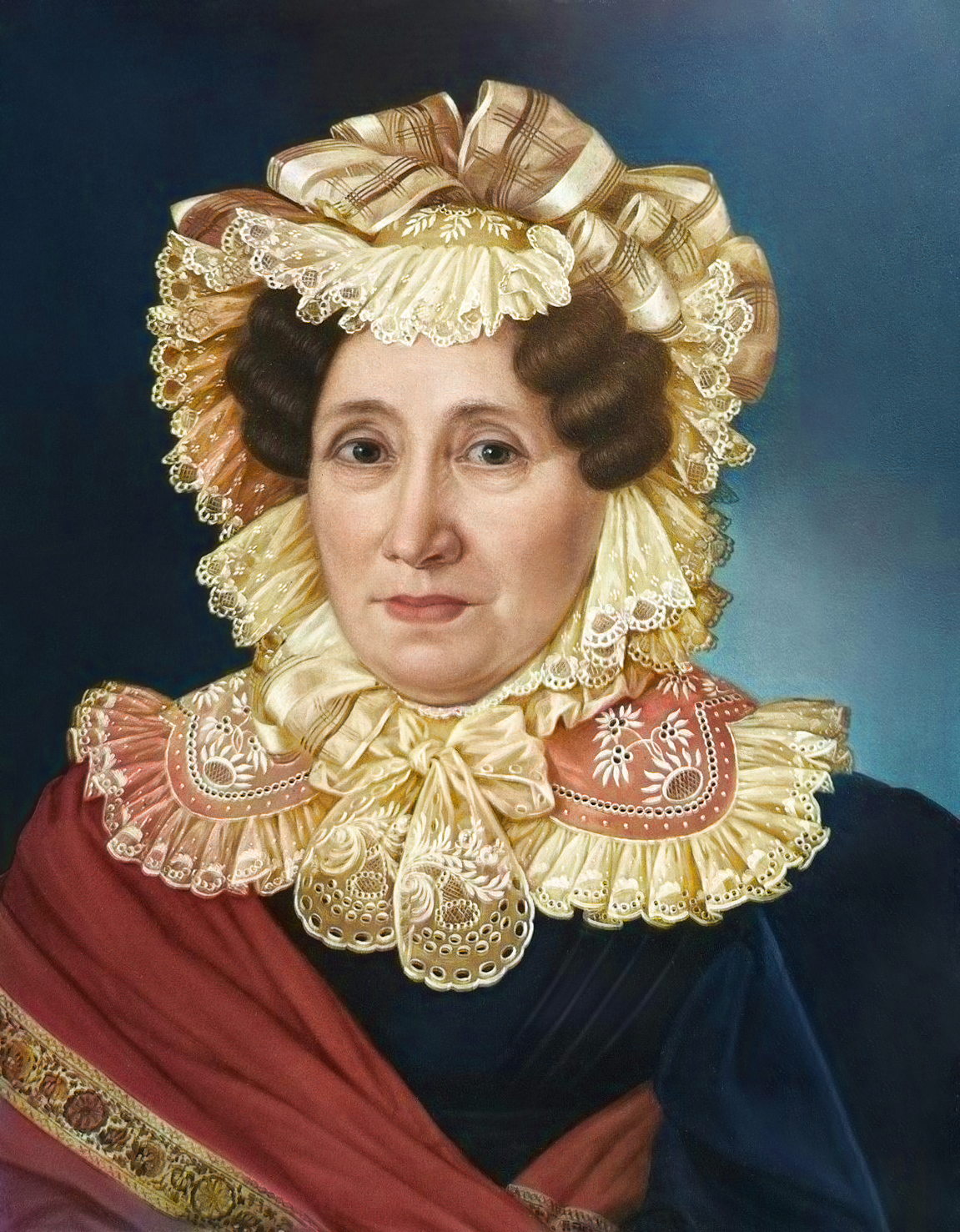
- Born: Christine Marie Klein; 21 September 1766; Drammen, Buskerud, Denmark–Norway
- Died: 8 April 1849 (aged 82); Schleswig, Duchy of Schleswig
- Burial place: Brethren Church, Christiansfeld, Denmark
- Occupation: Botanist
- Spouse: Peder von Cappelen (m. 1794)
- Children: 2

Christine Marie von Cappelen (née Klein, 21 September 1766 – 8 April 1849), sometimes known as "Maja" or "Mother Cappelen," was Norway's first female botanist.

== Early life and family ==
Von Cappelen was born on 21 September 1766 in Drammen, Buskerud, Denmark–Norway. She married merchant and politician Peder von Cappelen on 25 December 1784. She was sometimes known as "Maja" or "Mother Cappelen."

== Botany ==
Von Cappelen was Norway's first female botanist and was a friend of Norwegian botanist Christen Smith. She recorded a handwritten flora of the plants at Eidsfoss in Holmestrand, Norway, where her husband owned the ironworks Eidsfos Verk. The work was titled Wild-growing Plants in Eidsfoss and the Surrounding Area and is now held at the University Botanical Garden in Oslo.

Von Cappelen was also interested in astronomy.

== Death ==
Von Cappelen's husband died in 1837. She died on 8 April 1849 in Schleswig, Duchy of Schleswig, Denmark, aged 82. She was buried at the Brethren Church in Christiansfeld, Denmark.
