= Hof Municipality (Vestfold) =

Former municipality in Norway

Hof Municipality Hof kommune
- Former municipality
- Hof herred (historic name)
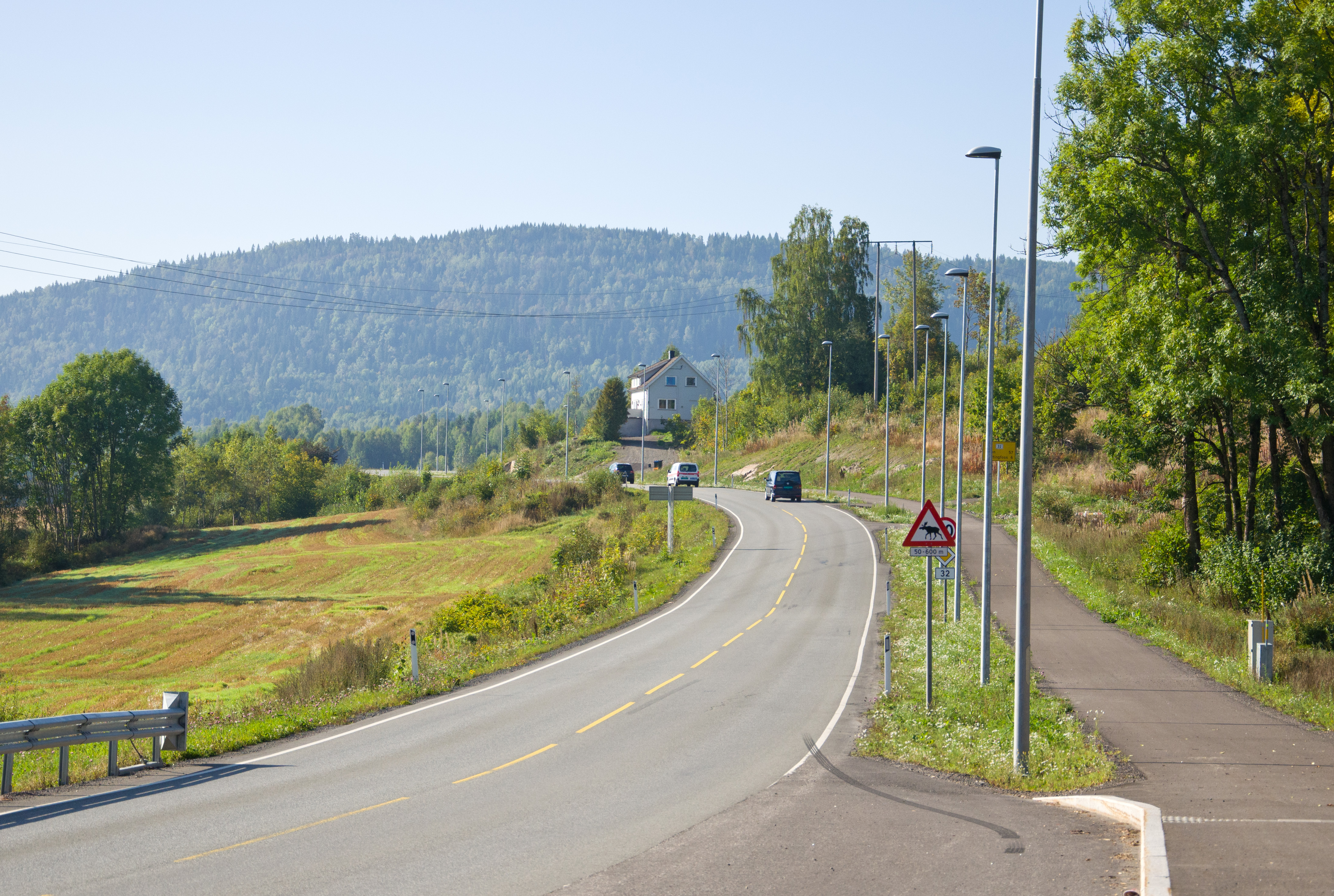

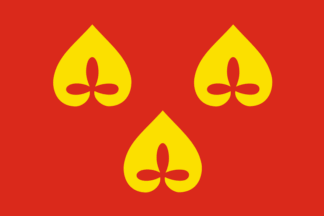
- Flag Coat of arms

- Vestfold within Norway

- Hof within Vestfold
- Coordinates: 59°31′49″N 10°05′13″E
- Country: Norway
- County: Vestfold
- District: Jarlsberg
- Established: 1 Jan 1838
  - Created as: Formannskapsdistrikt
- Disestablished: 1 Jan 2018
  - Succeeded by: Holmestrand Municipality
- Administrative centre: Hof

Government
  - Mayor (2015–2018): Mette Måge Olsen (Ap)

Area (upon dissolution)
  - Total: 163.12 km^{2} (62.98 sq mi)
  - Land: 148.58 km^{2} (57.37 sq mi)
  - Water: 14.54 km^{2} (5.61 sq mi) 8.9%
  - Rank: #354 in Norway
- Highest elevation (Skibergfjell): 634 m (2,080 ft)

Population (2017)
  - Total: 3,176
  - Rank: #261 in Norway
  - Density: 21.4/km^{2} (55/sq mi)
  - Change (10 years): ▲ +2.5%
- Demonym: Hofsokning

Official language
  - Norwegian form: Bokmål
- Time zone: UTC+01:00 (CET)
  - Summer (DST): UTC+02:00 (CEST)
- ISO 3166 code: NO-0714

Hof (Norwegian pronunciation: [ˈhɔf]; locally [hɔfː]) is a former municipality in Vestfold county, Norway. The 163.12-square-kilometre (62.98 sq mi) municipality existed from 1838 until its dissolution in 2018. The area is now part of Holmestrand Municipality in the traditional district of Jarlsberg. The administrative centre was the village of Hof. Other villages in the municipality included Eidsfoss and Sundbyfoss.

Prior to its dissolution in 2018, the 163.12-square-kilometre (62.98 sq mi) municipality was the 354th largest by area out of the 426 municipalities in Norway. Hof Municipality was the 261st most populous municipality in Norway with a population of about 3,176. The municipality's population density was 21.4 inhabitants per square kilometre (55/sq mi) and its population had increased by 2.5% over the previous 10-year period.

== General information ==
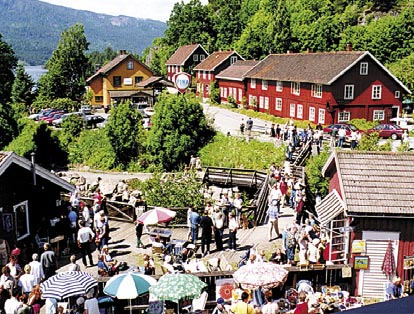
Eidsfoss

=== Administrative history ===
The formannskapsdistrikt law of 1837 created a system of local government in Norway by establishing each town (ladested or kjøpstad) and each Church of Norway prestegjeld as a civil municipality. On 1 January 1838, Hof prestegjeld was established as Hof Municipality. The borders of the municipality did not changed since that time (which is pretty rare among municipalities in Norway).

From 2017 to 2020, there were many municipal and county mergers across Norway due to the work of the Solberg cabinet. On 1 January 2018, Hof Municipality was dissolved and the following areas were merged to form an enlarged Holmestrand Municipality:

- all of Hof Municipality (population: 3,196)
- all of Holmestrand Municipality (population: 10,861)

=== Name ===
The municipality is named after the old Hof prestegjeld. The prestegjeld was named after the old Hof farm (Old Norse: Hof) since the first Hof Church was built there. The name is identical with the word hof which means "pagan temple", a place for worshiping the old Norse Gods.

=== Coat of arms ===
The coat of arms was granted on 17 July 1992. The official blazon is "Gules, three water lily leaves Or" (Norwegian: I rødt tre gull sjøblad, 2-1). This means the arms have a red field (background) and the charge is a seeblatt which is a water lily leaf design. The charge has a tincture of Or which means it is commonly colored yellow, but if it is made out of metal, then gold is used. The design is meant to symbolize the many lakes in the municipality. There are three leaves in the design to symbolize the three church parishes in Hof: Hof, Vassås, and Eidsfoss. The arms were designed by Geir Helgen. The municipal flag has the same design as the coat of arms.

=== Churches ===
The Church of Norway had one parish (sokn) within Hof Municipality. At the time of the municipal dissolution, it was part of the Nord-Jarlsberg prosti (deanery) in the Diocese of Tunsberg.

Churches in Hof Municipality
Parish (sokn)	Church name	Location of the church	Year built
Hof, Vassås og Eidsfoss	Eidsfoss Church	Eidsfoss	1904
Hof, Vassås og Eidsfoss	Hof Church	Hof	c. 1150
Hof, Vassås og Eidsfoss	Vassås Church	Vassås	c. 1200

== Geography ==
The municipality of Hof covered 164 square kilometres (63 sq mi), of which 140 square kilometres (54 sq mi) was land. Of the land in the municipality, 17.9 square kilometres (6.9 sq mi) was farmland and 125.1 square kilometres (48.3 sq mi) was forests. Hof Municipality consisted of the three parishes: Hof, Eidsfoss, and Sundbyfoss. Mountains in Hof included: Buaren, Vestfjellet, Skibergfjell, and Grøntjernkollen. The large lake Eikeren was partially located in Hof. The highest point in the municipality was the 634-metre (2,080 ft) tall mountain Skibergfjell.

Kongsberg Municipality was located to the west, Øvre Eiker Municipality was located to the north, Drammen Municipality was located to the northeast, Sande Municipality was located to the east, Holmestrand Municipality was located to the southeast, Re Municipality was located to the south, and Lardal Municipality was located to the southwest.

== Government ==
While it existed, Hof Municipality was responsible for primary education (through 10th grade), outpatient health services, senior citizen services, welfare and other social services, zoning, economic development, and municipal roads and utilities. The municipality was governed by a municipal council of directly elected representatives. The mayor was indirectly elected by a vote of the municipal council. The municipality was under the jurisdiction of the Nordre Vestfold District Court and the Agder Court of Appeal.

=== Municipal council ===
The municipal council (Kommunestyre) of Hof Municipality was made up of 17 representatives that were elected to four-year terms. The tables below show the historical composition of the council by political party.

Hof kommunestyre 2015–2017
Party name (in Norwegian)	Number of representatives
Labour Party (Arbeiderpartiet)	6
Conservative Party (Høyre)	7
Centre Party (Senterpartiet)	2
Joint list of the Green Party (Miljøpartiet De Grønne) and the Red Party (Rødt)	2
Total number of members:	17
Note: On 1 January 2018, Hof Municipality became part of Holmestrand Municipality.

Hof kommunestyre 2011–2015
Party name (in Norwegian)	Number of representatives
Labour Party (Arbeiderpartiet)	4
Conservative Party (Høyre)	9
Centre Party (Senterpartiet)	4
Total number of members:	17

Hof kommunestyre 2007–2011
Party name (in Norwegian)	Number of representatives
Labour Party (Arbeiderpartiet)	4
Conservative Party (Høyre)	8
Centre Party (Senterpartiet)	3
Socialist Left Party (Sosialistisk Venstreparti)	2
Total number of members:	17

Hof kommunestyre 2003–2007
Party name (in Norwegian)	Number of representatives
Labour Party (Arbeiderpartiet)	4
Progress Party (Fremskrittspartiet)	1
Conservative Party (Høyre)	6
Christian Democratic Party (Kristelig Folkeparti)	1
Centre Party (Senterpartiet)	3
Socialist Left Party (Sosialistisk Venstreparti)	2
Total number of members:	17

Hof kommunestyre 1999–2003
Party name (in Norwegian)	Number of representatives
Labour Party (Arbeiderpartiet)	6
Conservative Party (Høyre)	5
Centre Party (Senterpartiet)	6
Total number of members:	17

Hof kommunestyre 1995–1999
Party name (in Norwegian)	Number of representatives
Labour Party (Arbeiderpartiet)	6
Conservative Party (Høyre)	5
Centre Party (Senterpartiet)	6
Total number of members:	17

Hof kommunestyre 1991–1995
Party name (in Norwegian)	Number of representatives
Labour Party (Arbeiderpartiet)	7
Conservative Party (Høyre)	4
Christian Democratic Party (Kristelig Folkeparti)	1
Centre Party (Senterpartiet)	5
Total number of members:	17

Hof kommunestyre 1987–1991
Party name (in Norwegian)	Number of representatives
Labour Party (Arbeiderpartiet)	7
Progress Party (Fremskrittspartiet)	1
Conservative Party (Høyre)	4
Christian Democratic Party (Kristelig Folkeparti)	1
Centre Party (Senterpartiet)	3
Liberal Party (Venstre)	1
Total number of members:	17

Hof kommunestyre 1983–1987
Party name (in Norwegian)	Number of representatives
Labour Party (Arbeiderpartiet)	8
Conservative Party (Høyre)	4
Liberal Party (Venstre)	1
Joint list of the Centre Party (Senterpartiet) and the Christian Democratic Party (Kristelig Folkeparti)	4
Total number of members:	17

Hof kommunestyre 1979–1983
Party name (in Norwegian)	Number of representatives
Labour Party (Arbeiderpartiet)	8
Conservative Party (Høyre)	4
Joint list of the Centre Party (Senterpartiet) and the Christian Democratic Party (Kristelig Folkeparti)	5
Total number of members:	17

Hof kommunestyre 1975–1979
Party name (in Norwegian)	Number of representatives
Labour Party (Arbeiderpartiet)	9
Joint list of the Conservative Party (Høyre), Christian Democratic Party (Kristelig Folkeparti), and Centre Party (Senterpartiet)	8
Total number of members:	17

Hof kommunestyre 1971–1975
Party name (in Norwegian)	Number of representatives
Labour Party (Arbeiderpartiet)	9
Conservative Party (Høyre)	1
Centre Party (Senterpartiet)	4
Joint List(s) of Non-Socialist Parties (Borgerlige Felleslister)	3
Total number of members:	17

Hof kommunestyre 1967–1971
Party name (in Norwegian)	Number of representatives
Labour Party (Arbeiderpartiet)	9
Conservative Party (Høyre)	2
Centre Party (Senterpartiet)	6
Total number of members:	17

Hof kommunestyre 1963–1967
Party name (in Norwegian)	Number of representatives
Labour Party (Arbeiderpartiet)	11
Conservative Party (Høyre)	1
Centre Party (Senterpartiet)	5
Total number of members:	17

Hof herredsstyre 1959–1963
Party name (in Norwegian)	Number of representatives
Labour Party (Arbeiderpartiet)	10
Conservative Party (Høyre)	1
Centre Party (Senterpartiet)	6
Total number of members:	17

Hof herredsstyre 1955–1959
Party name (in Norwegian)	Number of representatives
Labour Party (Arbeiderpartiet)	10
Joint List(s) of Non-Socialist Parties (Borgerlige Felleslister)	7
Total number of members:	17

Hof herredsstyre 1951–1955
Party name (in Norwegian)	Number of representatives
Labour Party (Arbeiderpartiet)	9
Joint List(s) of Non-Socialist Parties (Borgerlige Felleslister)	6
Total number of members:	15

Hof herredsstyre 1947–1951
Party name (in Norwegian)	Number of representatives
Labour Party (Arbeiderpartiet)	9
Local List(s) (Lokale lister)	6
Total number of members:	15

Hof herredsstyre 1945–1947
Party name (in Norwegian)	Number of representatives
Labour Party (Arbeiderpartiet)	10
Joint List(s) of Non-Socialist Parties (Borgerlige Felleslister)	5
Total number of members:	15

Hof herredsstyre 1937–1941*
Party name (in Norwegian)	Number of representatives
Labour Party (Arbeiderpartiet)	8
Joint List(s) of Non-Socialist Parties (Borgerlige Felleslister)	7
Total number of members:	15
Note: Due to the German occupation of Norway during World War II, no elections were held for new municipal councils until after the war ended in 1945.

=== Mayors ===
The mayor (Norwegian: ordfører) of Hof Municipality was the political leader of the municipality and the chairperson of the municipal council. The following people have held this position:

- 1838–1843: Morten Smith Petersen
- 1844–1849: Ole Hansen Hafsrud
- 1850–1853: Sven Pedersen Goverud, Sr.
- 1854–1855: Torger Olsen Korby
- 1856–1859: Sven Pedersen Goverud, Sr.
- 1860–1863: Torger Olsen Korby
- 1864–1875: Thomas E. Herstad
- 1876–1879: Per Svensen Goverud
- 1880–1887: Ole Svendsen Goverud
- 1888–1889: Edvard Halvorsen Sundby
- 1890–1898: Thorvald O. Gran
- 1899–1902: Jacob Olsen Lindseth
- 1902-1902: Christian Olsen Thon (H)
- 1903–1907: Sven Pedersen Goverud, Jr.
- 1908–1916: Christian Olsen Thon (H)
- 1917–1922: Nils Unnemark (Bp)
- 1923–1928: Ole Bertil Grennæs (Bp)
- 1929–1930: Ludvig Lørdal (Ap)
- 1931-1931: Olaf M. Tormodsrud
- 1931-1931: Ludvig Lørdal (Ap)
- 1932–1934: Ole Bertil Grennæs (Bp)
- 1935–1937: Olaf M. Tormodsrud
- 1938–1940: Hans Klaussen (Ap)
- 1940–1941: Ole Lindseth (NS)
- 1941–1942: Olaf Frich (NS)
- 1943–1945: Gunnar Reggestad (NS)
- 1945–1963: Hans Klaussen (Ap)
- 1964–1971: Per Båstad
- 1972–1979: Arne Solli
- 1980–1983: Roar Kristian Nordby (Sp)
- 1984–1985: Gunnar Lindseth (KrF)
- 1986–1987: Gunnar Haavik (H)
- 1988–1991: Arne Gravdal (Sp)
- 1992–1993: Åse Fjellestad (H)
- 1994–1999: Kari Akerholt (Sp)
- 2000–2012: Olav Bjørnli (H)
- 2012–2015: Ragnar Lindås (H)
- 2015–2017: Mette Måge Olsen (Ap)

== Economy ==
Hof Municipality was a typical community based on agriculture and forestry. Its largest industry was a lumber mill. Hof was located in the climate zone best suited for agriculture in Norway. Therefore, wheat was one of the most important agricultural products of the municipality. However, between 1998 and 2008, 40% of the municipal farms become inactive, and the agricultural employment rate dropped to about 5%.

Hof was known for its great hunting and fishing resources as well. With 120,000 acres (490 km^{2}) of forest open for hunting, it was quite popular and there were commercial hunting opportunities. About 75 landowners in Hof united in a land owner union (Hof Utmarkslag), and hunters were required to purchase permits from them (mainly small game hunting) to use their land.

In the first decade of the 21st century, hunters typically harvested the following amounts of game animals annually in Hof: over 100 moose, 1–5 red deer, 80–90 roe deer, and 0–10 beaver.

== See also ==
- List of former municipalities of Norway
