= Claus Røyem =

Dano-Norwegian civil servant and government official

Acting Diocesan Governor of Christianssand stiftamt
- In office 1685–1692

Personal details
- Born: 1638 Aabenraa, Denmark
- Died: 4 September 1692 (aged 53–54) Copenhagen, Denmark
- Citizenship: Denmark-Norway
- Profession: Politician

Claus Røyem (1636–1692) was a Dano-Norwegian civil servant and government official. He served as the acting Diocesan Governor of Christianssand stiftamt from 1685 until his death in 1692.

He was the son of a merchant in Sønderborg Niels Clausen Røyem and his wife Mette Nielsdatter. He married Else Dop, who was the daughter of the Provost Christen Dop and his wife Maren Olufsdatter Prytz. In 1672 he bought a share in the farm Haughem in Sandefjord, which he owned until his death.

In 1659, he was bailiff in Tønsberg. He then became a councilor in Tønsberg in 1673. In 1675 he was appointed as the bailiff in Brunla. In 1683 he became a county administrator in Larvik county. In 1685, he was given the job of acting Diocesan Governor of Christianssand stiftamt. The governor was Christian Stockfleth during this time, but he was also serving as an envoy to Sweden, so while he was absent, Røyem took over his duties as governor. During this period, he also served as the acting County Governor of Lister og Mandals Amt as well (one of the subordinate counties to Christianssand). In 1691, Jørgen Müller resigned as the County Governor of Nedenæs amt (another one of the subordinate counties), so Røyem took over leadership of that county for Stockfleth as well. Røyem died in 1692.

Government offices
Preceded by Ludvig Holgersen Rosenkrantz	Diocesan Governor of Christianssand stiftamt 1685–1692; Acting for Stockfleth	Succeeded by Christian Stockfleth
Preceded by Ludvig Holgersen Rosenkrantz	County Governor of Lister og Mandals amt 1685–1692; Acting for Stockfleth	Succeeded by Jørgen Hansen Burchart
Preceded by Jørgen Müller	County Governor of Nedenæs amt 1691–1692; Acting for Stockfleth	Succeeded by Christian Stockfleth
