= Jørgen Hansen Burchart =

Danish-Norwegian politician (born c. 1630)

Governor of Lister og Mandals amt
- In office 1692–1699

Personal details
- Born: c.1630 Denmark
- Died: c. 1700
- Citizenship: Denmark-Norway
- Profession: Government official

Jørgen Hansen Burchart (born c. 1630) was a Danish-Norwegian government official. He served as the County Governor of Nyborg og Tranekjaer county in Denmark during 1692 and then of Lister og Mandal county from 1692 to 1699.

Burchart was the son of the Bishop of the Diocese of Ribe, Hans Borchardsen and his wife Karen Jørgensdatter Brod. He attended the University of Copenhagen from 1651 to 1654.

Government offices
Preceded by Jens Rosenkrantz	County Governor of Nyborg og Tranekjaer amt 1692–1692	Succeeded by Flemming Holck
Preceded by Claus Røyem (Acting governor for Christian Stockfleth)	County Governor of Lister og Mandals amt 1692–1699	Succeeded by Andreas Undall
