= Gartmann =

Gartmann is a surname. Notable people with the surname include:

- Aby Gartmann (1930–2018), Swiss bobsledder
- Arnold Gartmann (1904–1980), Swiss bobsledder
- Arnold Gartmann (luger) (born 1941), Swiss luger

== See also ==
- Garmann
- Gartman
