= Hof Prison =

Prison in Vestfold, Norway

Coordinates: 59°32′37″N 10°05′01″E

Hof Prison (Norwegian: Hof fengsel) was a prison in Hof in Vestfold, Norway.

It had a capacity of 105 prisoners, serving sentences of up to one year. It was closed in 2019.
