= Gartman =

Gartman is a surname of German origin. Notable people with the surname include:

- Earl Gartman (c.1920–1995), American football, baseball, and basketball coach and college athletics administrator
- Maria Gartman (1818–1885), Dutch actress

== See also ==
- Gartmann
