= Eidsfos Verk =

Ironworks in Vestfold county, Norway

Coordinates: 59°35′43″N 10°02′18″E

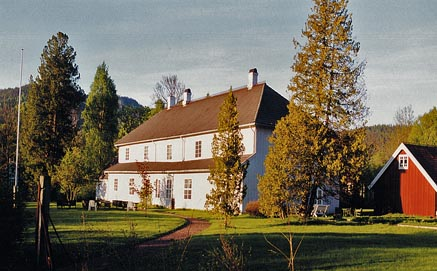
Eidsfos Manor dates from c. 1740s

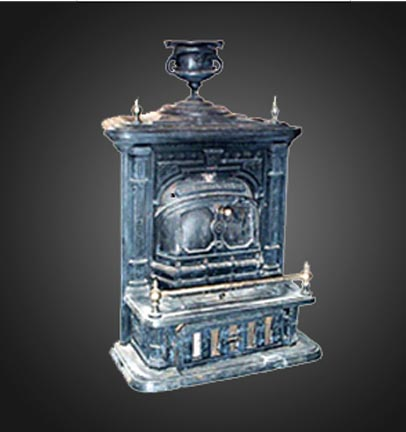
Stove from Eidsfos Verk

Eidsfos Verk (English: Eidsfos Iron Works) was an ironworks located at Eidsfoss in Vestfold county, Norway.

Eidsfos Verk was established in 1697 when the first blast furnace was first put into operation. The ironwork, which was dependent on hydropower, ore and forest, was located on the isthmus between Eikeren and the Bergsvannet. It was established and operated by Lieutenant General Caspar Herman Hausmann (1653–1718) and later his widow Karen Toller (1662-1742).

In 1785 the works were acquired by merchant Peder von Cappelen (1763-1837). The owners had a seat on Eidsfos Manor (Eidsfos Hovedgård), which was their private residence until 1897.

The ironworks closed in 1873. Among the company's later activities had been production of foundry products, freight wagons and agricultural machinery. In 1979 the Eidsfos Historic Foundation (Stiftelsen Gamle Eidsfos) was established to preserve the old ironworks community. Parts of the old ironworks have since become incorporated into a museum (Eidsfoss Jernverksmuseum) which is associated with Vestfold Museum (Vestfoldmuseene).

== Other sources ==
- Joramo, Morten Alexander (1997) Eidsfos (jern)verk 1697-1997 (jubileumsbok. Eidsfoss). ISBN 8299419700
