= Garmann =

Garmann is a surname. Notable people with the surname include:

- Herman Garmann (1787–1853), Norwegian businessman and merchant
- Kari Garmann (born 1945), Norwegian politician

== See also ==
- Garman
- Gartmann
