= Karen Toller =

Norwegian estate owner and ship owner (1662–1742)

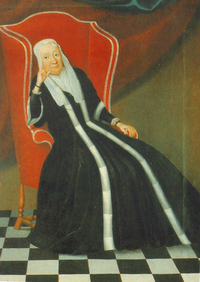
- Born: Karen Nielsdatter Toller; 1662; Tønsberg, Norway
- Died: 13 August 1742 (aged 79–80); Christiania, Norway
- Spouse: Caspar Herman Hausmann (m. 1681; died 1718)
- Relatives: Niels Toller (grandfather)

Karen Toller (1662 – 13 August 1742) was a Norwegian estate owner and ship owner who through her inheritance, became one of the wealthiest women in Christiania and one of the largest property owners in the first half of the 18th century. She also built the Oslo Ladegård.

== Life ==
Karen Nielsdatter Toller was born in Tønsberg in 1662 to Niels Toller (c. 1624–1676) and Kirsten Andersdatter Tonsberg (1637–1701), and was a granddaughter of merchant and Mayor of Christiania Niels Toller (c. 1590–1642). At the time, it was standard for daughters to inherit only half as much as sons, but Toller's parents in as early as 1672, ensured that all their children would inherit equally. When her parents did die, she inherited significant fortunes from both of them, including sawmills, several farms and other properties, and made her one of the richest women in Christiania.

She married General and merchant Caspar Herman Hausmann in around 1681. The couple's timber exports and shipping business was greatly affected by the Great Northern War, and Toller last estimated in 1721 that they had lost around 29,000 riksdaler.

In 1718, when she was 56, her husband died and Toller took control of the family's businesses. A few weeks after his death, she sold one of the oldest houses in Christiania, which she inherited from her father, for 4000 riksdaler to be used as a cathedral school. The school operated until 1823, when it was sold to the Norwegian Parliament. Toller also contributed 200 riksdaler to the establishment of a hospital for poor people in Christiania.

In 1722, Toller bought the Old Bishop's Palace in Oslo, which had been previously owned by her grandfather Niels Toller. She invested heavily into it, paying the King 7700 riksdaler for the dirt road around it, but he later cancelled the purchase. However, she later paid 9300 riksdaler for its title deed in 1729. In 1725, Toller erected a new building on the grounds, which she called the Oslo Ladegård, which still stands today.

Toller died in Christiania on 13 August 1742.
