= Peder von Cappelen =

Norwegian merchant and politician

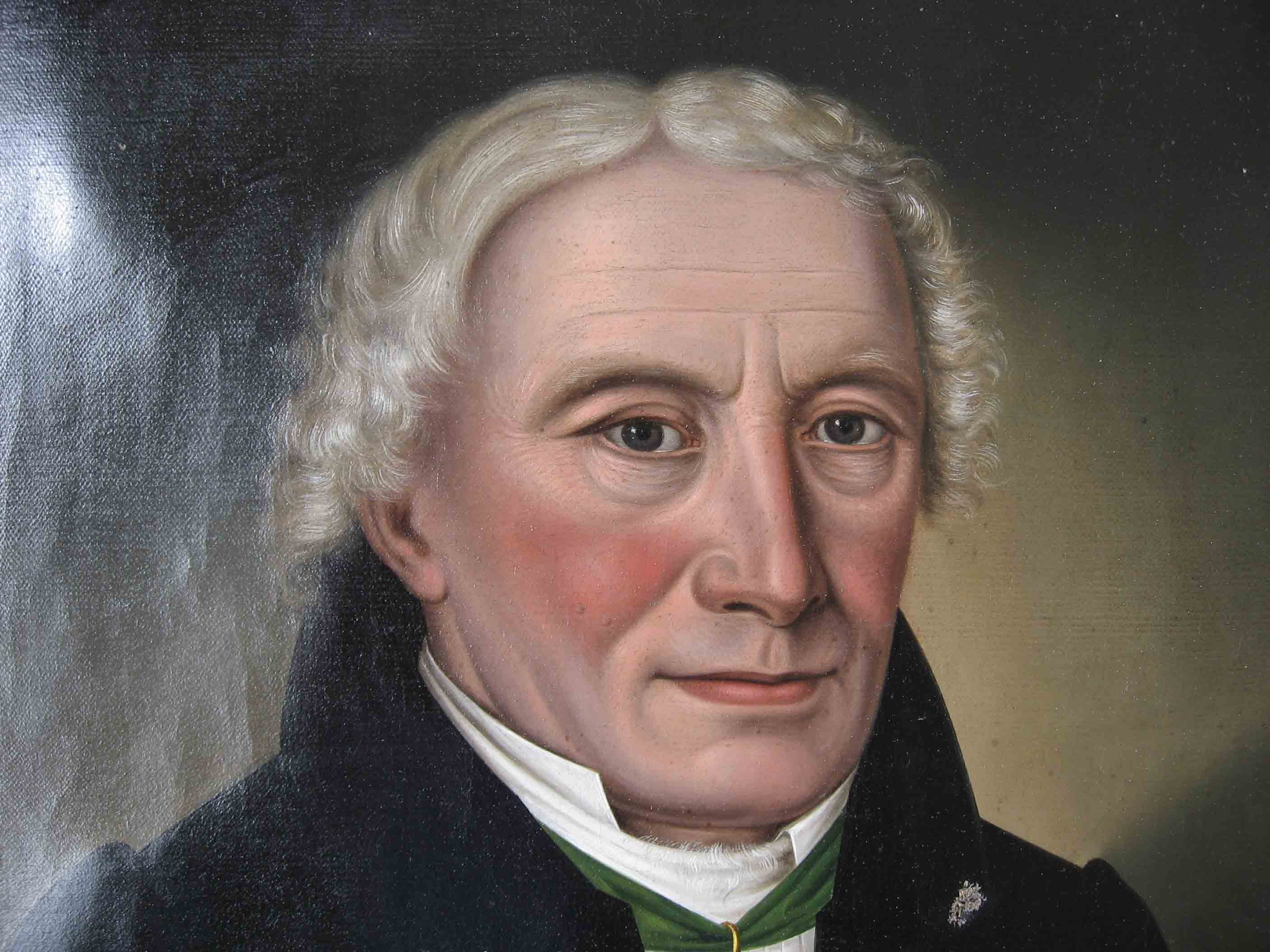
- Born: 24 January 1763; Gjerpen, Norway
- Died: 11 March 1837 (aged 74); Eidsfos Verk
- Occupations: merchant and politician
- Spouse: Christine Marie von Cappelen (m. 1794)

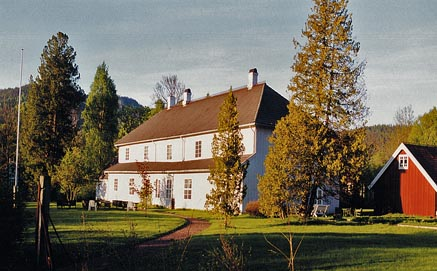
Eidsfos Manor

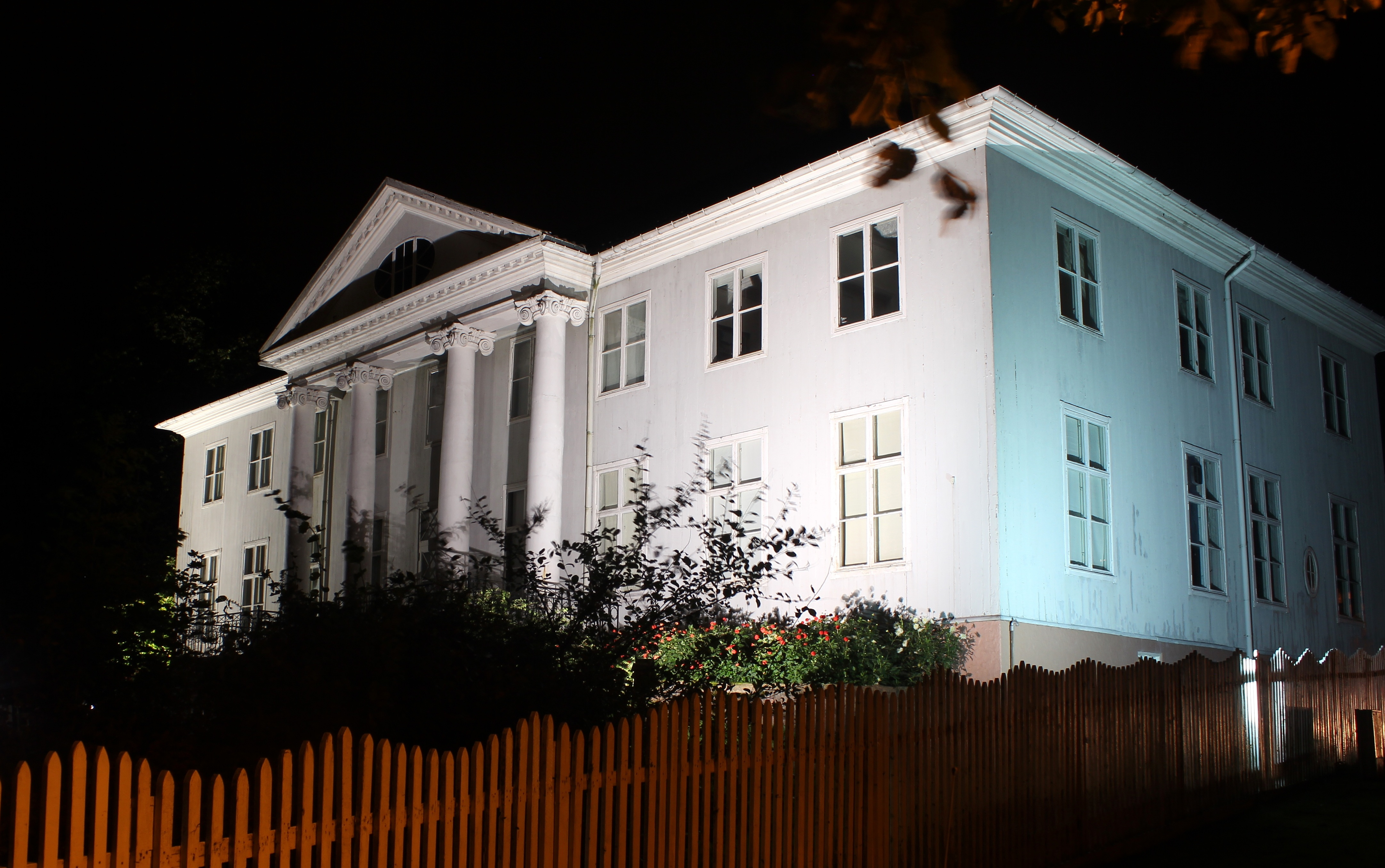
Austad Manor

Peder von Cappelen (24 January 1763 – 11 March 1837) was a Norwegian merchant and politician. He was involved in timber trade and was an owner of ironworks. Cappelen was a member of the Parliament of Norway.

== Personal life ==
Peder von Cappelen was born and raised at Mæla Manor in Gjerpen (Mæla gård i Gjerpen) which is now part of Skien Municipality in Telemark, Norway. He was one of the sons of the wholesaler, timber merchant and ship owner Diderich von Cappelen (1734–1794) and his first wife Petronelle Pedersdatter Juel (1737–1785). He was the brother of Diderik von Cappelen and Ulrich Fredrich von Cappelen.

== Career ==
Cappelen attended Kingswood boarding school in Bristol, England (1780–1781). He received a business education both abroad and at the extensive family businesses in Telemark. He settled as a wholesaler at Strømsø in Drammen during 1784. He purchased the trading facilities at Cappelengården from Peter Collett in 1784. He also acquired Austad farm through marriage. He had a seat at Eidsfos Manor (Eidsfos Hovedgård), which was his private residence.

Cappelen acquired the Eidsfos Iron Works at Hof in Vestfold during 1795, and Kongsberg Iron Works on Numedalslågen in 1824. In 1811 he donated 10,000 rigsdaler to the establishment of a University in Christiania (now University of Oslo). He represented Drammen at the Parliament of Norway from 1815. He was decorated Knight of the Order of Vasa in 1825.

== Personal life ==
In 1784, he married Christine Marie Klein (1766–1849). Cappelen died at Eidsfos Verk in 1837. Both of their two daughters had died before their parents. After his death, his affairs were managed by son-in-law, Jørgen von Cappelen Omsted and John Collet Bredesen.
