= Old Bishop's Palace in Oslo =

Residence of Roman Catholic bishops of Oslo, Norway

Coordinates: 59°54′22.27″N 10°46′3.02″E

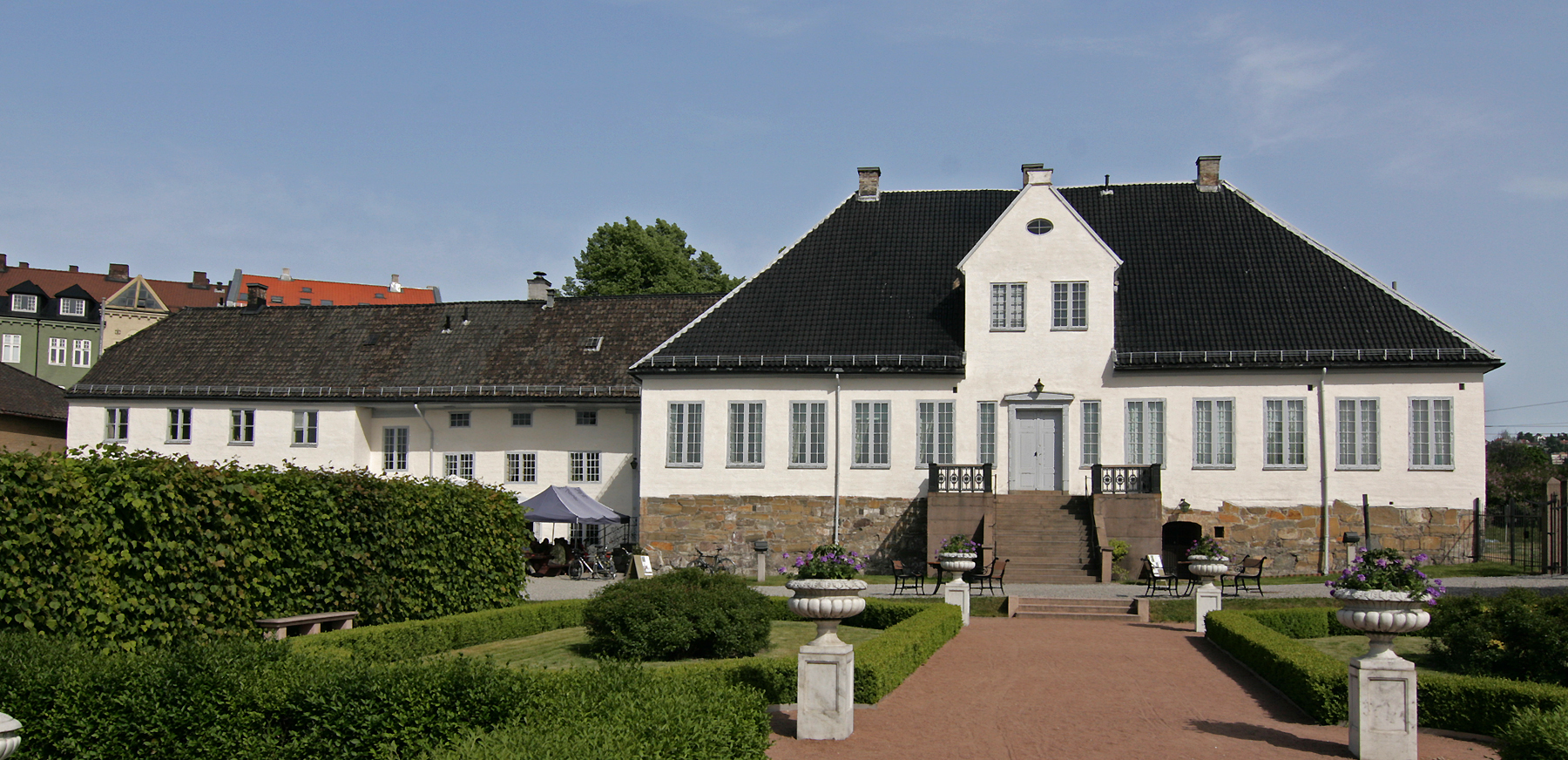
Oslo Ladegård

The Old Bishop's Palace in Oslo (Oslo Bispeborg) was the residence of the Roman Catholic bishops of Oslo. The estate is located in what is now called Gamlebyen (old town) in Oslo, Norway. Various remnants of the medieval bishop's original palace are still visible.

== History ==
The construction was begun around 1210 by the then bishop, Nikolas Arnesson, continuing through to the early 14th century. The palace built in stone replaced a previous bishop's residence built in wood, established in the 12th century. The main buildings were surrounded by tall walls, and from a tower, a wooden bridge connected the palace to the neighboring Hallvards Cathedral. The palace was built like a fortified castle. Together with the cathedral, the palace was not only a religious centre in Middle Age Oslo, it was also of significant political importance. The first agreement of union between Norway and Sweden was signed in the bishop's palace just after the death of Håkon V of Norway, in 1319.

The palace was damaged after Swedish attacks in 1523, and after the reformation in 1537 large parts of the palace were torn down. In 1554 the Protestant bishop moved to the current bishop's residence in Oslo, a former monastery. In 1579 the mayor of Oslo, Christen Mule, built a Renaissance building on the ruins of the previous bishop's palace, and in this building King James VI of Scotland married princess Anne of Denmark on November 23, 1589.

After a fire in 1722, the current manor house (Oslo Ladegård) was erected by Karen Toller on the site in 1725. Oslo Ladegård was built in classical Baroque architecture style on the foundation of former Bishop's Palace. Today the manor house is used by the City of Oslo as a museum and concert hall.
