= Hof Church (Vestfold) =

Church in Vestfold, Norway

- Hof kirke
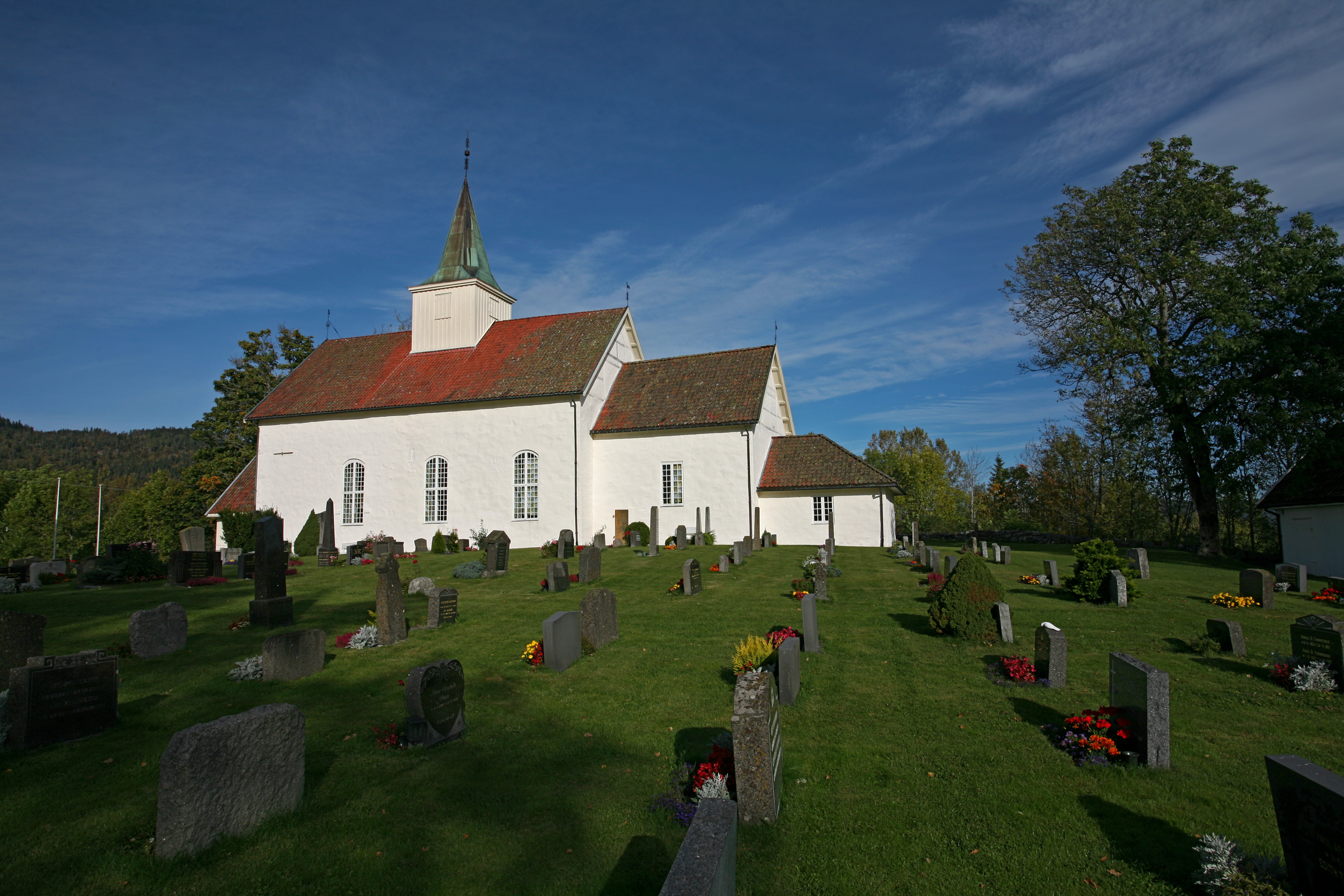
- View of the church
- Hof Church
- 59°32′22″N 10°04′47″E
- Location: Holmestrand Municipality, Vestfold
- Country: Norway
- Denomination: Church of Norway
- Previous denomination: Catholic Church
- Churchmanship: Evangelical Lutheran

History
- Status: Parish church
- Founded: c. 1150
- Consecrated: c. 1150

Architecture
- Functional status: Active
- Architectural type: Long church
- Completed: c. 1150 (876 years ago)

Specifications
- Capacity: 210
- Materials: Stone

Administration
- Diocese: Tunsberg
- Deanery: Nord-Jarlsberg prosti
- Parish: Hof, Vassås og Eidsfoss
- Norwegian Cultural Heritage Site
- Type: Church
- Status: Automatically protected
- ID: 84589

Hof Church (Norwegian: Hof kirke) is a parish church of the Church of Norway in Holmestrand Municipality in Vestfold county, Norway. It is located in the village of Hof. It is one of the churches for the "Hof, Vassås og Eidsfoss" parish which is part of the Nord-Jarlsberg prosti (deanery) in the Diocese of Tunsberg. The white, stone church was built in a long church design around the year 110 using plans drawn up by an unknown architect. The church seats about 210 people.

== History ==
The earliest existing historical records of the church date back to the year 1367, but the church was not built that year. The church was likely built in the second half of the 12th century. The building originally included a nave and chancel, which are both made of stone (with timber-framed gables). In 1662, a stone sacristy was built on the east end of the chancel. At some point, a church porch was added to the west end of the nave. Like other churches in the area, this one was owned by the Count of Jarlsberg from 1673 until it was sold to the parish in 1765 for 900 rigsdaler.

In 1814, this church served as an election church (Norwegian: valgkirke). Together with more than 300 other parish churches across Norway, it was a polling station for elections to the 1814 Norwegian Constituent Assembly which wrote the Constitution of Norway. This was Norway's first national elections. Each church parish was a constituency that elected people called "electors" who later met together in each county to elect the representatives for the assembly that was to meet at Eidsvoll Manor later that year.

In 1815, the old church porch was replaced with a new one. In 1958, the church porch was torn down and a new wooden one was built in its place.

== Media gallery ==
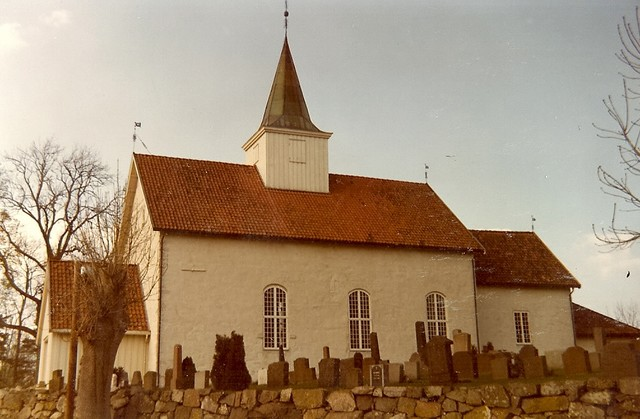

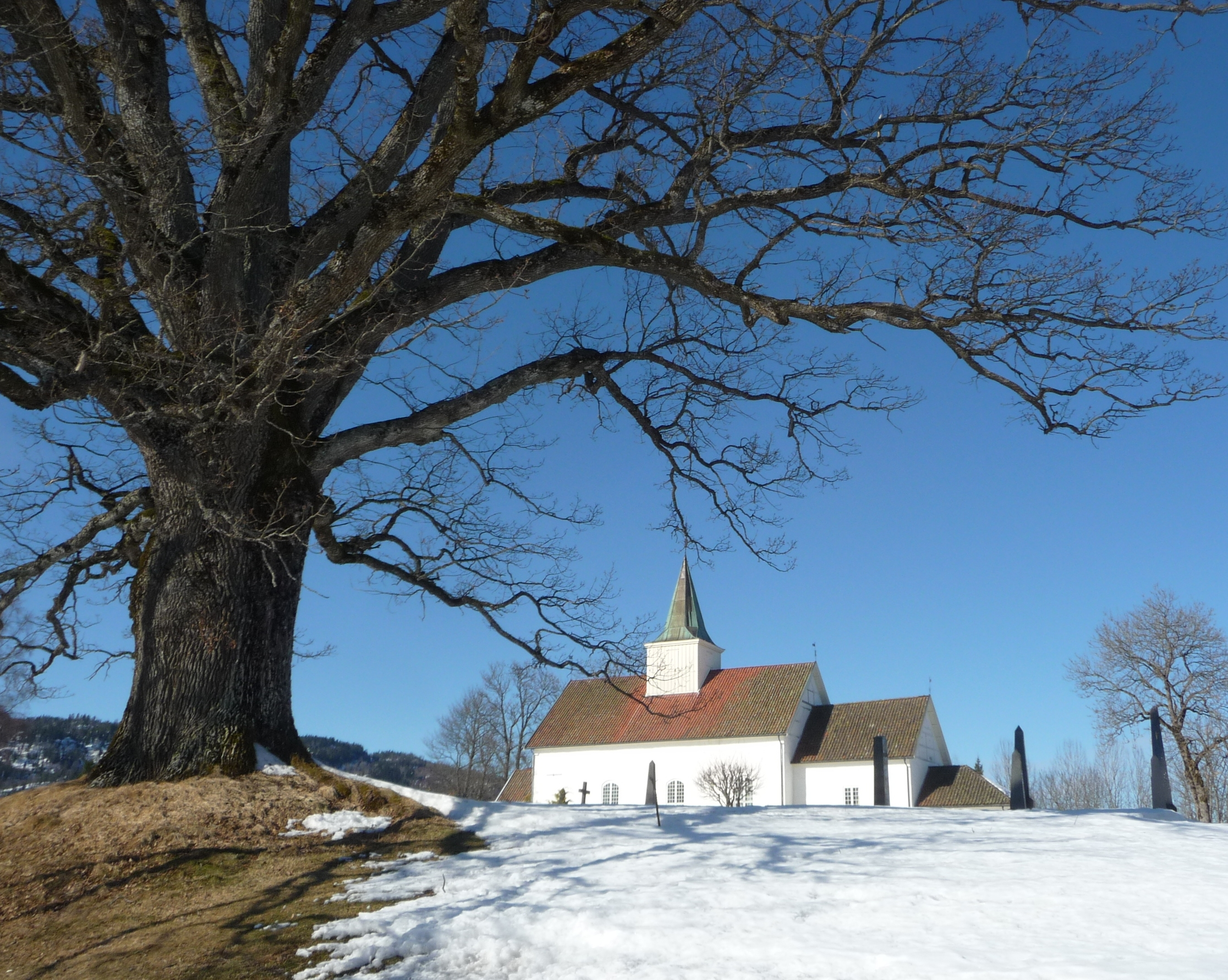

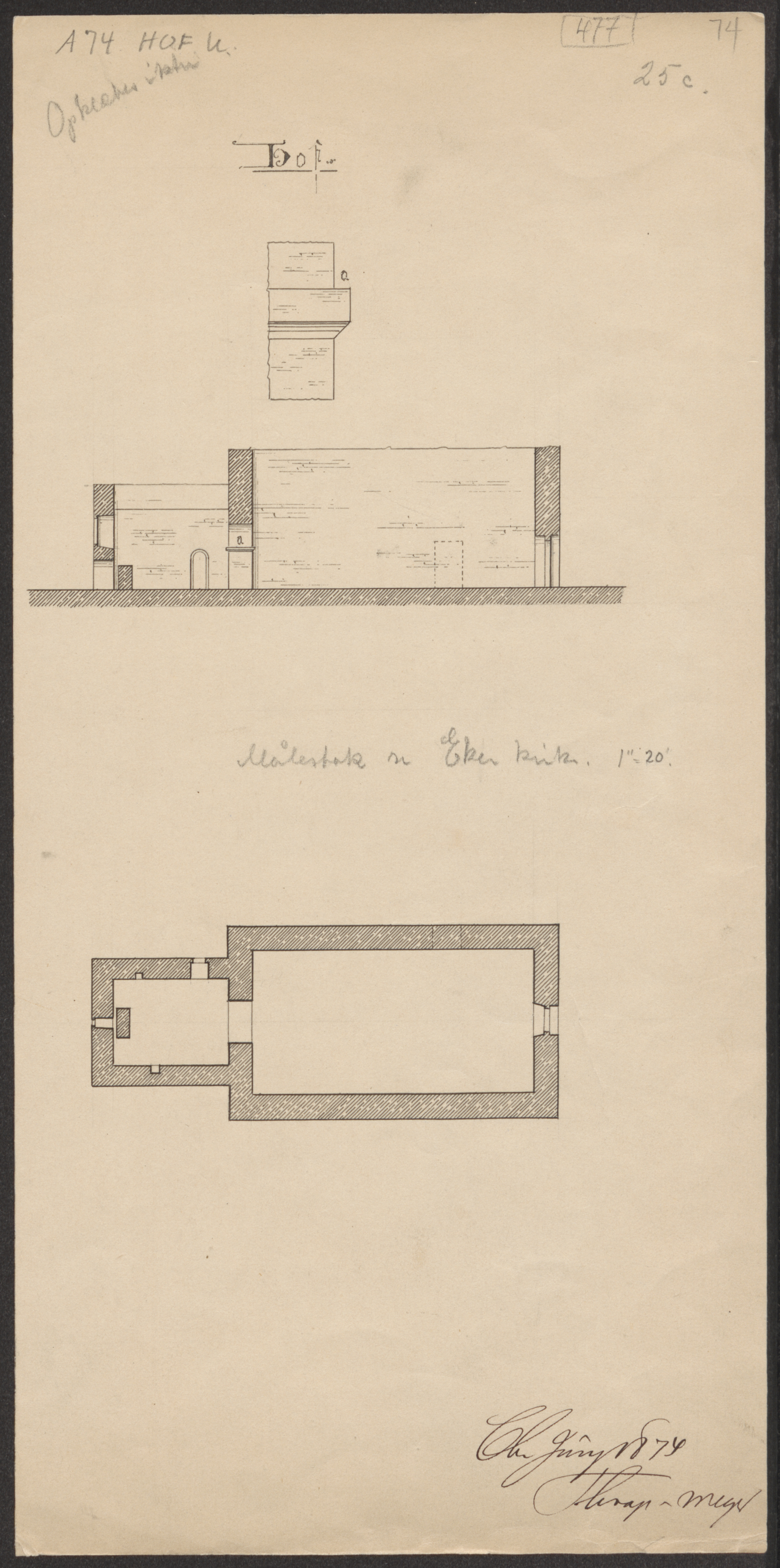

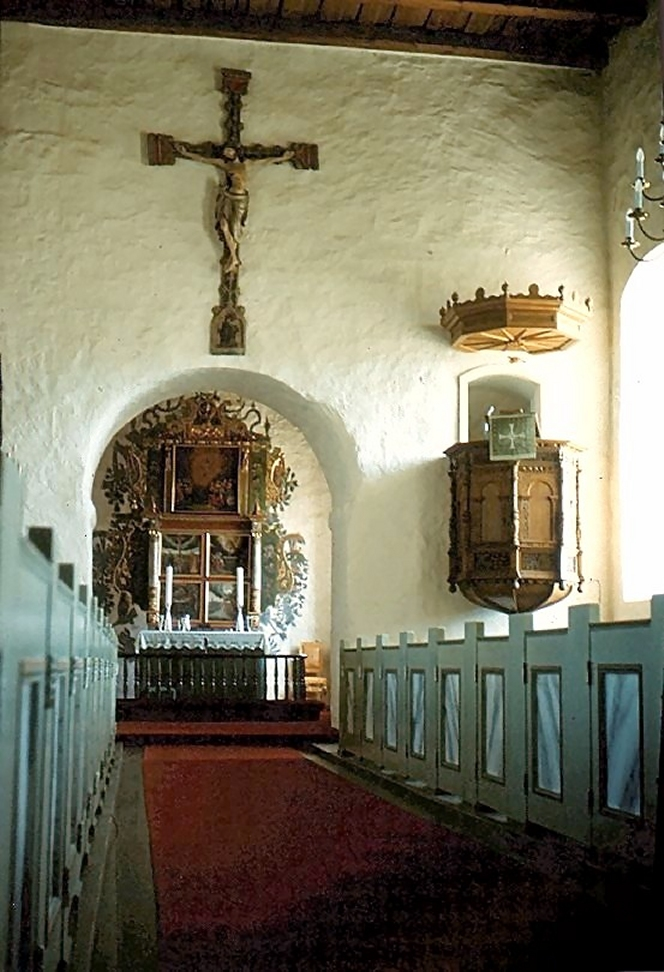

== See also ==
- List of churches in Tunsberg
