= Oslo Ladegård =

Manor house in Oslo, Norway

Coordinates: 59.9061°N 10.7676°E

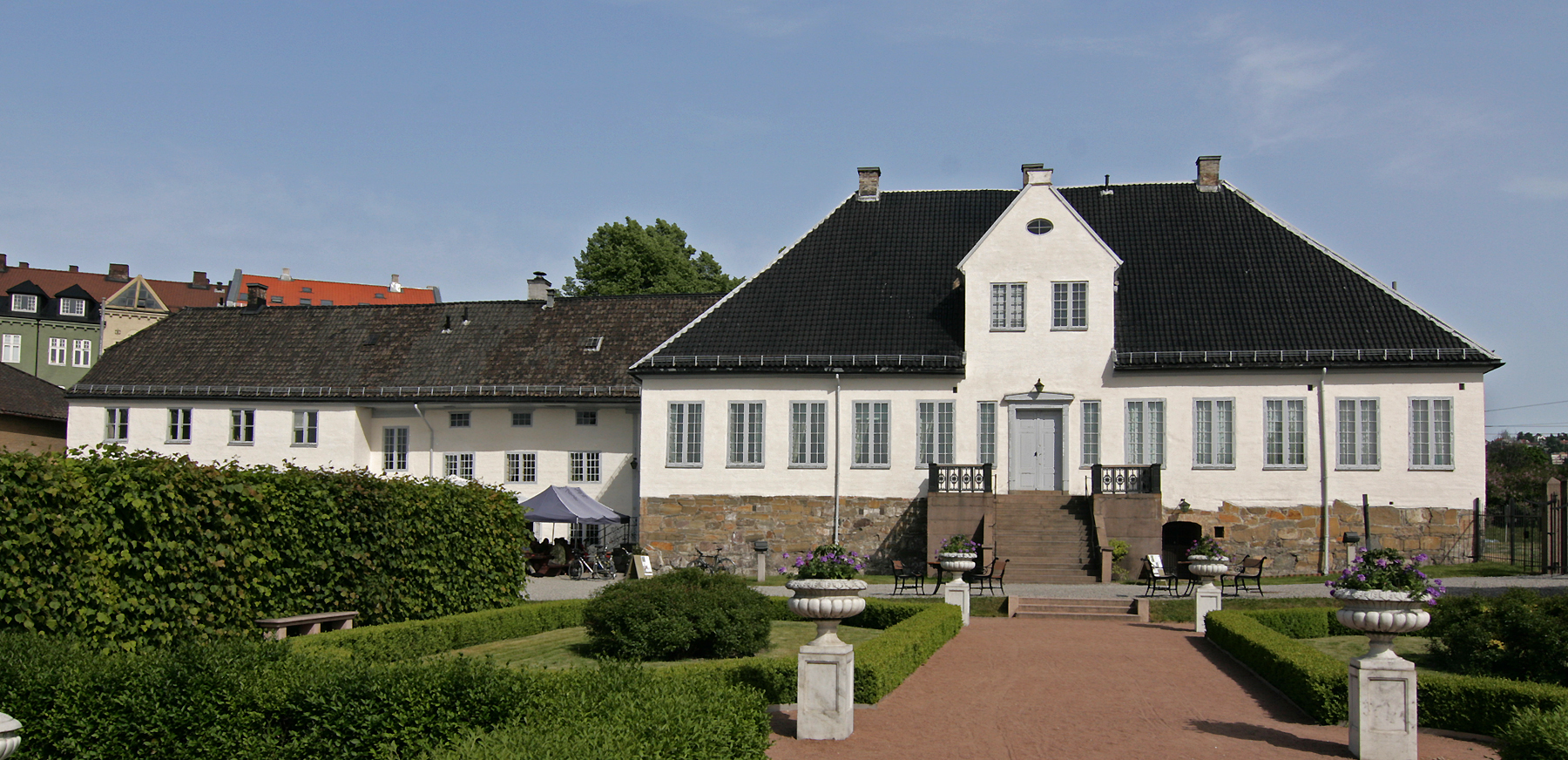
The main building

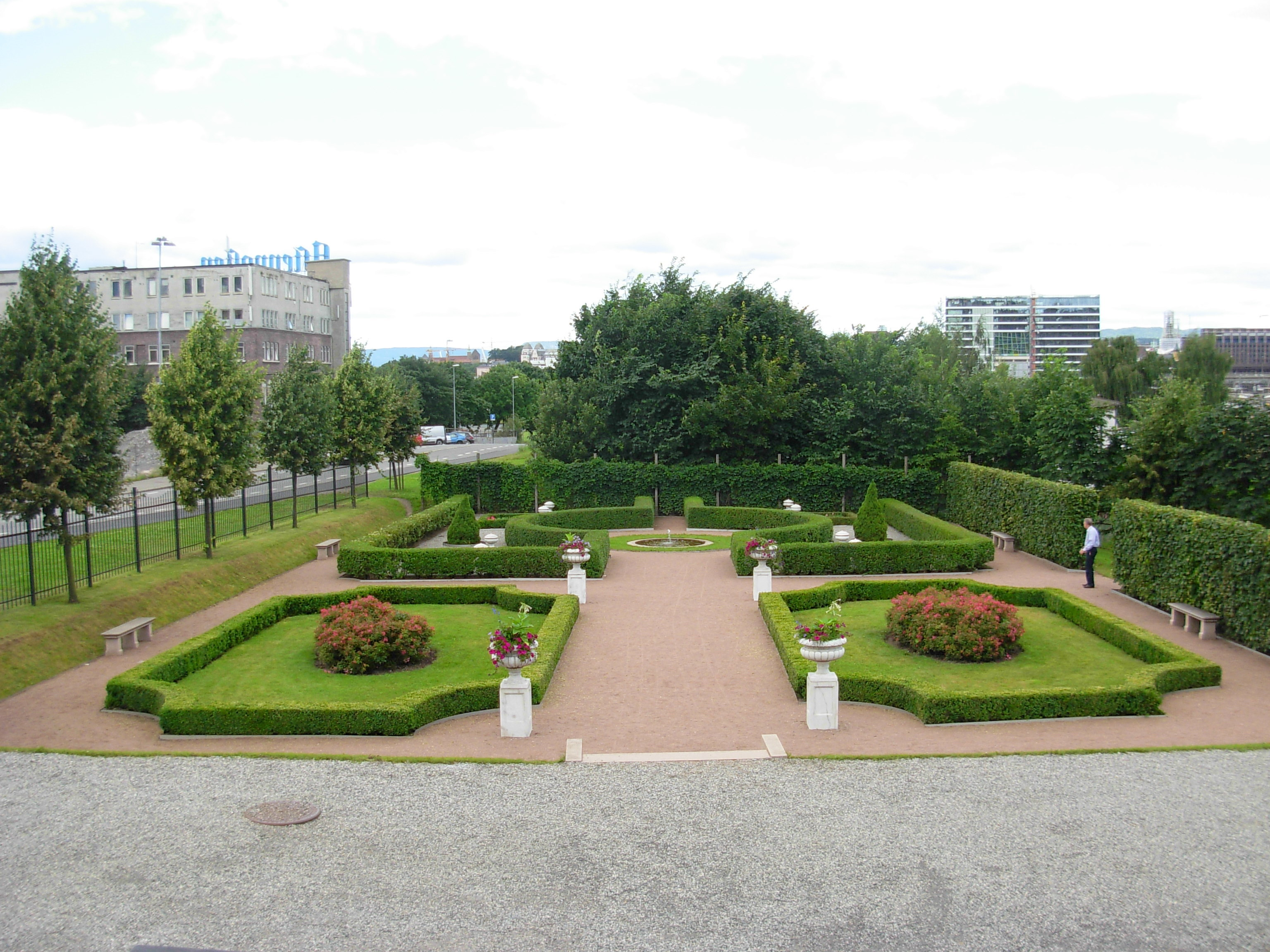
The garden

Oslo Ladegård is a manor house situated at Gamlebyen in Oslo, Norway. It was built of the site of the Old Bishop's Palace in Oslo.

The current building was erected in 1725 by Karen Toller. The architectural style is classic baroque, with a high, hipped roof and a symmetrical ground plan. The hall in the cellar dates from the Old Bishop's Palace of the 13th century. The property was expropriated by the government for railway purposes in 1894, and in 1956 it transferred to the City of Oslo. The manor house is used as a museum and concert hall. The estate garden, which went almost down to the seafront during the late 1700s, was reconstructed and reopened in 1999 on the basis of a pattern from 1779.

The name comes from this area being used for unloading ships with supplies for Akershus fortress after the founding of Christiania, (now Oslo). The word "lade" means to load in this context.
