= Henning Stockfleth =

Norwegian cleric

Henning Stockfleth Bishop
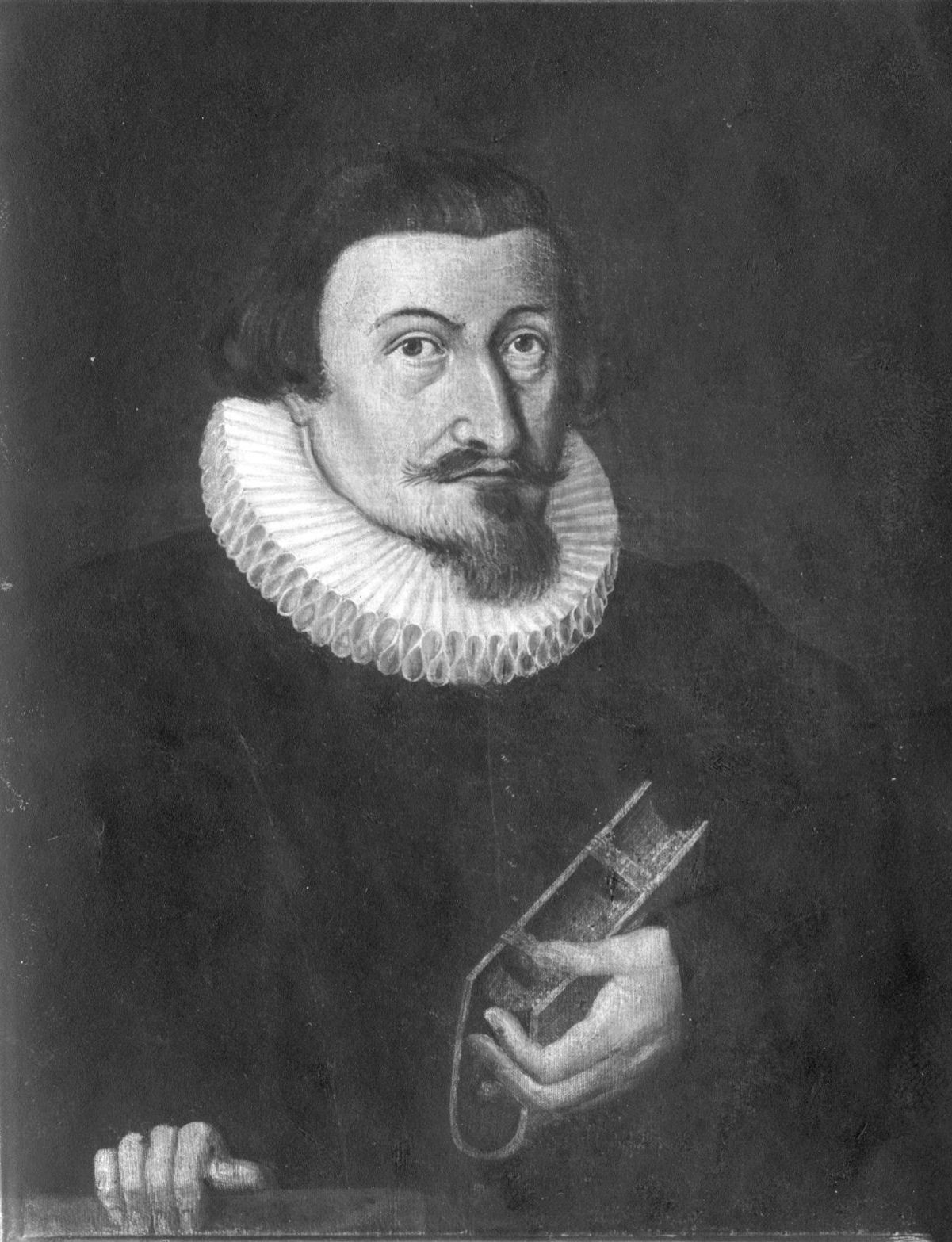

Personal details
- Born: ca. 1610 Haderslev, Denmark
- Died: 5 February 1664 Christiania (now Oslo), Norway
- Denomination: Lutheran
- Parents: Eggert Stockfleth (1565-1638)
- Spouse: Magdalena Johansdatter Schnell (d.1674)
- Occupation: Priest
- Education: Magister Degree in Theology
- Alma mater: University of Copenhagen

Henning Stockfleth (c.1610 – 5 February 1664) was a Norwegian cleric and Bishop of Oslo.

== Biography ==
Henning Eggertsen Stockfleth was born in Haderslev, Denmark. He was the son of Danish merchant Eggert Stockfleth (1565-1638). In 1629, he entered the Latin school in Haderslev. He studied at the University of Rostock, continued in 1632 to the University of Wittenberg and came in 1635 to the University of Copenhagen. He took magister degree in theology in 1637.

Between 1628–1629, his parents and brothers had moved from Haderslev to Bragernes. From 1637, Stockfleth served as rector and professor at the Christiania Cathedral School. He later assumed various positions as priest. In 1641 he became vicar at Aker in Akershus, priest at Akershus Fortress and later provost at Bragernes deanery. From 1646 to 1664, he was Bishop of Akershus stift (now Diocese of Oslo).

He was a signatory of the 1661 Sovereignty Act (Enevoldsarveregjeringsakten), the new constitution of Denmark-Norway, as one of the 87 representatives of the Norwegian clerical estate, one of the two privileged estates of the realm in Denmark-Norway.

== Personal life ==
He was married to Magdalena Johansdatter Schnell (d.1674) and was the father of civil servant and diplomat Christian Stockfleth. His brother was civil servant and businessman Hans Stockfleth.

== Other sources ==
- Allan Tønnesen (ed.), Magtens besegling. Enevoldsarveregeringsakterne af 1661 og 1662 underskrevet og beseglet af stænderne i Danmark, Norge, Island og Færøerne, Heraldisk Selskap/Syddansk Universitetsforlag, Odense 2013, ISBN 9788776746612

Church of Norway titles
Preceded by Oluf Boesen	Bishop of Akershus stift 1646–1664	Succeeded by Hans Rosing
