= Christian Stockfleth =

Norwegian civil servant and diplomat

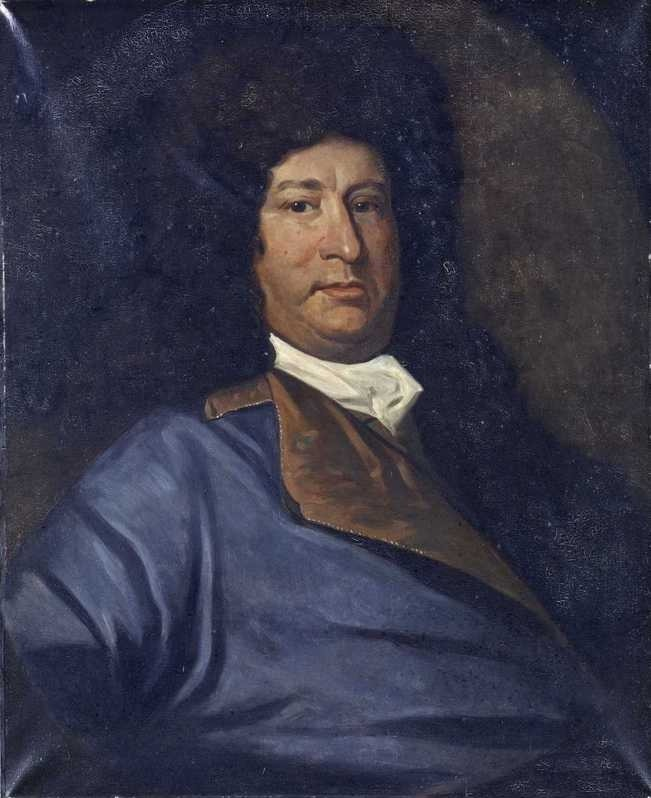
- Portrait of Christian Stockfleth

Diocesan Governor of Christianssand stiftamt
- In office 1685–1694

County Governor of Aggershuus amt
- In office 1694–1699

Diocesan Governor of Bergenhus stiftamt
- In office 1699–1704

Personal details
- Born: 1639 Christiania, Norway
- Died: 31 March 1704 (aged 64–65)
- Citizenship: Denmark–Norway
- Parent: Henning Stockfleth (father)
- Relatives: Hans Stockfleth (uncle); Mats de Tonsberg (brother-in-law)
- Education: University of Copenhagen
- Profession: Civil servant

Christian Stockfleth (1639 – 31 March 1704) was a Norwegian civil servant and diplomat. He was born in Christiania, Norway, a son of bishop Henning Stockfleth, and a nephew of civil servant Hans Stockfleth. Stockfleth studied at the University of Copenhagen, and further in other European cities. He assumed various central positions in Norway. From 1683 to 1691 he was appointed Envoy to Stockholm. After returning to Norway he held various positions as Diocesan governor and County Governor in Christianssand, Akershus, and Bergen until his retirement in 1704, shortly before his death.

Government offices
Preceded by Ludvig Holgersen Rosenkrantz	Diocesan Governor of Christianssand stiftamt 1685–1694 (Absent from 1685-1692; Claus Røyem was acting governor during that time)	Succeeded by Mats de Tonsberg
Preceded by Ludvig Holgersen Rosenkrantz	County Governor of Lister og Mandals amt 1685–1694 (Absent from 1685-1692; Claus Røyem was acting governor during that time)	Succeeded by Jørgen Hansen Burchart
Preceded by Just Justssøn Høg	County Governor of Aggershuus amt 1694–1699	Succeeded by Frederik Gabel
Preceded by Christian Gyldenløve	Diocesan Governor of Bergenhus stiftamt 1699–1704	Succeeded by Mats de Tonsberg
Preceded by Axel Rosenkrantz	County Governor of Bergenhus amt 1702–1704	Succeeded by Mats de Tonsberg
