= Hans Stockfleth =

Norwegian civil servant, businessman and investor

Hans Eggertsen Stockfleth (1600s – 19 February 1664) was a Norwegian civil servant, businessman and investor.

Stockfleth was a son of Danish merchant Eggert Stockfleth (1565-1638). His parents moved from Haderslev to Bragernes in Buskerud during 1629. He was a brother of bishop Henning Stockfleth (c.1610–1664) and an uncle of diplomat Christian Stockfleth (1640-1704). His brother Jakob Stockfleth (1607-1652) was a Councilor in Christiania (now Oslo).

Stockfleth was appointed bailiff of several districts including in Hadeland (1628-29) Gudbrandsdalen (1629-36) and Buskerud (1636-42). His position as bailiff provided an opportunity to achieve personal wealth especially in forested properties. From 1636, Stockfleth operated the Åmot sawmill at Modum in Buskerud. He also controlled the watercourses north of the sawmill, especially from Hallingdal. In 1652-53, Stockfleth acquired additional sites in Aker, Follo, Romerike and Ringerike. He eventually came to be among the largest sawmill owners in Norway. From 1649, he was also an investor with the Hassel Iron Works (Hassel jernverk) at Modum, together with fellow Haderslev native Johan Garmann. During the 1640s, he built one of the city's most stately homes on Dronningens gate in Christiania. He served as mayor of Christiania from 1643 until his death.
