= Hans Georg Jacob Stang =

Hans Georg Jacob Stang may refer to:

- Hans Georg Jacob Stang (prime minister) (1830–1907), Norwegian Prime Minister 1888 to 1889
- Hans Georg Jacob Stang (minister of defence) (1858–1907), Norwegian Minister of Defence 1900 to 1903
