= Nobility Law (Norway) =

1821 Norwegian law

The Nobility Law (full name: Law concerning modifications and closer determinations of the Norwegian Nobility's rights; Norwegian: Adelsloven or Lov, angaaende Modificationer og nærmere Bestemmelser af den Norske Adels Rettigheder) was passed by the national parliament in Norway, the Storting, on 1 August 1821. It abolished noble titles and privileges within two generations and required legal proof of nobility in the meantime.

The law reflected the democratic philosophy of the Storting's majority, and was passed effectively unanimously in 1815 and 1818, but was both times vetoed by the King before being passed with a large majority the third time. It initiated the abolition of all noble titles and privileges, while the current nobility and their living legitimate children were allowed to keep their noble status or titles and certain privileges for the rest of their lives. Under the law, nobles who wished to present a claim to nobility before the Norwegian parliament were required to provide documentation confirming their noble status.

== Text in English ==
§ 1. The countships and the barony in Norway shall, in regard to the administration of the functions of the civil authorities, be placed either under the county wherein the estates are located or under the nearest county; however, the countships may together constitute a county if it most graciously should please His Majesty to appoint for them their own authority.

The assumption of administration by the respective county governor (prefect) shall be effective from 1 October this year.

§ 2. As soon as the currently appointed overbirk judges withdraw, in the aforementioned districts all decisions in cases in the second instance, and other functions proper to the overbirk things, shall be placed in the superior court in the bishopric in which the district is located.

§ 3. The right previously accorded to counts, barons and noblemen, resulting from their privileges or the laws, to appoint or to propose clerical or civil officials on their estates is, in accordance with § 21 of the Constitution, entirely abolished.

§ 4. Likewise, the so-called "neck and hand," or the duty imposed on the nobility to have criminals on their estates arrested, prosecuted, and punished, together with the right of term and restitution following from it and accruing to the nobility, shall henceforth be abolished, so that hereafter, with respect to the arrest, prosecution, and punishment of criminals, as well as the imposition of fines, it shall occur on the estates of the nobility according to the regulations generally in force in the kingdom.

§ 5. The freedom from taxes and tithes to which counts and barons are at the present time entitled with respect to the dues for their primary farm and for a certain quantity of associated tenant farms, together with the freedom from taxes and tithes to which noblemen resident on farms are entitled with respect to their primary farms, shall terminate with the present fief holders or owners, and not be passed down to their heir.

§ 6. The rest of the present privileges and prerogatives of the nobility shall, insofar as they do not conflict with § 108 of the Constitution, remain for the noblemen who today are in possession thereof and for their children born in lawful wedlock at the time of publication of this law, such that they shall retain the same for their lifetime, as long as they legally prove their title thereto before the next regular Storting. After the deaths of these persons, who thus remain in possession of certain noble rights, all hereditary noble status here in the kingdom ceases to exist.

§ 7. Anyone who does not prove his nobility with legal documents before the next regular Storting shall have forfeited his right to present claims of nobility in the future either for himself or for the children whom he now has.

== Original text in Danish ==
§ 1. Grevskaberne og Baroniet i Norge skulle, i Henseende til de civile Overøvrigheds-Forretningers Bestyrelse, henlægges enten under det Amt, hvori Godserne ere beliggende, eller under nærmeste Amt; dog maae Grevskaberne til sammen udgjøre et Amt, hvis det naadigst maatte behage Hans Majestæt for dem at udnævne egen Overøvrighed.

Forretningernes Overtagelse af vedkommende Amtmænd skal skee fra 1ste October dette Aar.

§ 2. Saasnart de nu beskikkede Overbirkedommere afgaae, skal i foranførte Districter, alle Sagers Paakjendelse i anden Instants, og andre til Overbirkethingene henhørende Forretninger, henlægges under Overretten i det Stift, i hvilket Districtet er beliggende.

§ 3. Den Grever, Baroner og Adelsmænd, ifølge deres Privilegier eller Lovene, forhen tilkommende Ret, at beskikke eller foreslaae geistlige eller civile Embedsmænd paa deres Godser er, ifølge Grundlovens 21 §, aldeles ophævet.

§ 4. Ligeledes skal det saakaldte Hals og Haand, eller den Adelen paalagte Forpligtelse, at lade Forbrydere paa dens Godser anholde, tiltale og afstraffe, samt den deraf flydende Adelen tilkommende Sigt- og Sagefaldsret, for Eftertiden være ophævet, saa at der herefter, i Henseende til Forbryderes Anholdelse, Tiltale og Afstraffelse, saavelsom Bøders Erlæggelse, paa Adelens Godser, skal forholdes efter de almindelige i Riget gjeldende Regler.

§ 5. Den Grever og Baroner for nærværende Tid tilkommende Skatte- eller Tiendefrihed for deres Hovedgaards Taxter og for en vis Qvantitet underliggende Bøndergods, saavelsom den Skatte- eller Tiendefrihed, der tilkommer adelige Sædegaardseiere for deres paaboende Hovedgaarde, skal ophøre med de nuværende Lehnsbesiddere eller Eiere, og ikke gaae over paa deres eftermænd.

§ 6. De øvrige den nuværende Adels privilegier og Forrettigheder skulle, forsaavidt de ikke stride imod Grundlovens 108 §, vedblive for de Adelsmænd, som for nærværende Tid ere i Besiddelse deraf, og for deres, ved denne Lovs Bekjendtgjørelse, i lovligt Ægteskab fødte Børn, saaledes, at disse fremdeles beholde samme for deres Livstid, saafremt de for næste ordentlige Storthing lovligen bevise deres Adkomst dertil. Efter de Personers Død, som saaledes vedblive i Besiddelse af visse adelige Rettigheder, ophører alt arveligt Adelskab her i Riget.

§ 7. Enhver, som ikke for næste ordentlige Storthing ved lovlige Documenter beviser sit Adelskab, skal have tabt sin Ret til, for Fremtiden at gjøre Paastand derpaa, enten for sig selv eller for sine nu havende Børn.

== List of Nobility of Norway in 1821 ==
Family	Name	Birth	Death	Father	Children Born before and living on 1 August 1821	Rank	Ref.
1	Johan Caspar Herman, Count of Wedel-Jarlsberg			Frederich Anton, Count of Wedel-Jarlsberg		Lensgreve	
	Juliane Marie, Countess of Wedel-Jarlsberg			Frederich Anton, Count of Wedel-Jarlsberg		Lenskomtesse	
	Caroline Sophie Amalie, Countess of Wedel-Jarlsberg			Frederich Anton, Count of Wedel-Jarlsberg		Lenskomtesse	
	Helene Margrethe, Countess of Wedel-Jarlsberg	1791	1857	Frederich Anton, Count of Wedel-Jarlsberg		Lenskomtesse	
	Sophie Frederiche Antoinette, Countess of Wedel-Jarlsberg	1807	1892	Frederich Anton, Count of Wedel-Jarlsberg		Lenskomtesse	
2	Frederich Christopher, Count of Trampe	1779	1832	Adam Frederich, Count of Trampe to Løgismose	Adam Frederich Johan (1798–1876)	Greve	
3	Christian Hendrich, Baron of Hoff-Rosencrone	1768	1837	Hans Edvard von Hoff	Edvardine Reinholdine (1820–1901)	Lensbaron	
4	Carl Ferdinand Maria, Baron of Wedel-Jarlsberg	1781	1857	Frederich Anton, Count of Wedel-Jarlsberg		Lensbaron?	
	Christian Frederich, Baron of Wedel-Jarlsberg	1788	1854	Frederich Anton, Count of Wedel-Jarlsberg		Lensbaron?	
	Frederich Wilhelm, Baron of Wedel-Jarlsberg	1787	1863	Frederich Christian Wedel-Jarlsberg	Hildur (1814–1901); Finn Frederich Wilhelm (1815–1901); Hermann Thorvald (1817–1867); Frederik Joachim (1819–1880); Louise Sara Ulriche (1820–1838)	Lensbaron?	
	Wilhelm Frederich, Baron of Wedel-Jarlsberg	1786	1885	Frederich Anton, Count of Wedel-Jarlsberg	Anton Frederich (1813–1858); Christian August (1813–1870); Catharina Kirsten (1815–1894); Petrea (1821–1839)	Lensbaron?	
5	Eggert Christopher, Baron Løvenskiold to Ulefos and Holden	1788	1861	Michael Herman, Baron Løvenskiold	Herman Severin (1815–1870); Frederiche Juliane Wilhelmine (1817–1835)	Lensbaron	
6	Carl Løvenskiold						
	Frederich Franz Michael Løvenskiold	1790	1869	Severin Løvenskiold, the older	Henriette Benedicte Christiane Dorothea (1819–1888)		
	Niels Løvenskiold						
	Severin Løvenskiold, the younger	1777	1856	Severin Løvenskiold, the older	Adam Christopher (1804–1886); Otto Joachim (1811–1882)		
7	August Niels Anker			Niels Anker			
	Elen Margrethe Anker			Niels Anker			
	Erich Theodor Christian Bernhard Anker	1785	1858	Carsten Tank Anker	Carsten Christian (1817–1898); Hedevig Betzy Sigismunda Annette (1819–1879)		
	Morten Anker	1780	1838	Jess Anker	Jess (1808–1864); Bernt Olaus (1809–1881); Christian (1811–1885); John Collett (1816–1866)		
	Niels Christopher Anker	1799	1862	Jan Anker			
	Peder Bernhard Anker	1787	1849	Jess Anker			
	Peder Martin Anker	1801	1863	Niels Anker	All children born after 1821.		
	Sophie Adelaide Rosalie Anker			Niels Anker			
8	Hagbarth de Falsen	1791	1836	Enevold de Falsen	Enevold (1814–1839); Henriette Christiane (1815–1884); John Collett (1817–1879); Christian Baltazar (1819–1854)		
9	Peter Otto Rosenørn Grüner	1783	1847				
10	Hans Hagerup Gyldenpalm	1774		Eiler Hagerup Gyldenpalm			
11	Andreas Niels Hauch						
12	Johannes Nicolay de Kløcker				Karen Amalie Johanne (1820–1854)		
13	Niels Joachim Knagenhjelm	1796	1852	Christen Knagenhielm	Anne Sophie Dorothea (1821–1907)		
14	Bredo Hendrich von Munthe af Morgenstierne	1774	1835	Otto Christopher von Munthe af Morgenstierne	Ottilia Christine Pauline (1804–1886); Christian Fredrik Jacob (1806–1886); Sophie Elisabeth (1808–1892); Wilhelmine Johanne Helene (1810–1858); Augusta Julie Georgine (1812–1885); Wilhelm Ludvig Herman (1814–1888)		
15	Peter Tordenskiold						
16	Knud Adolph Gyldenstierne Roepstorph	1746	1824	Carl Ludvig Roepstorph			
17	Oluf Borch de Schouboe				Frederiche (1801–1890); Anna Petra (1802–1854); Henriette (1805–1875); Sophie (1807–1865); Julie (1809–1878); Wilhelm Christian (1811–1892); Ulriche Antoinette (1813–1901)		
	Ulrich Frederich Anton de Schouboe				Julie Elise (1813–1911); Olufa Frederiche (1815–1892)		

The 18th family, Bergh, withdrew their claim, and the claims of Captain Brømbsen and F.J. Cold were dismissed as unproven.

== See also ==
- Norwegian nobility
- Norwegian noble titles

== Literature ==
- Paulsen, P.I. (1931) Norges Lover 1660–1930. Grøndahls & Søns Boktrykkeri, Oslo. pp. 93–94.
- Storthings-Efterretninger 1814–1833
