= Vilhelm Reesen =

Norwegian officer and government official

Governor of Lister og Mandals amt
- In office 1718–1745

Personal details
- Born: 7 July 1675 Skåne, Sweden
- Died: 29 April 1745 (aged 69) Lyngdal, Norway
- Citizenship: Denmark-Norway
- Profession: Government official

Vilhelm Reesen (1675-1745) was a Norwegian officer and government official. He served as a naval officer from 1689 until 1718. He was then appointed as the County Governor of Lister og Mandal county from 1718 until his death in 1745.

Government offices
Preceded by Povel Juel	County Governor of Lister og Mandals amt 1718–1745	Succeeded by Jens Stoud
