= Kristin Kverneland Lønningdal =

Norwegian politician (1923–2010)

Governor of Rogaland
- In office 1982–1991
- Preceded by: Konrad Birger Knutsen
- Succeeded by: Harald Thune (acting for Tora Aasland)

Personal details
- Born: 1 January 1923 Stavanger, Norway
- Died: 23 February 2010 (aged 87) Norway
- Citizenship: Norway
- Party: Conservative Party
- Profession: Politician

Kristin Kverneland Lønningdal (1 January 1923 – 23 February 2010) was a Norwegian politician for the Conservative Party.

She was born in Stavanger and was educated as a pharmacist in 1947. Lønningdal was a member of the executive committee of Stavanger city council from 1963 to 1973. From 1967 to 1973 she was also a member of Rogaland county council. She was elected to the Parliament of Norway from Rogaland in 1973, and was re-elected in 1977. She had previously served as a deputy representative during the terms 1965–1969 and 1969–1973. Her political career ended with the post of County Governor of Rogaland, which she held from 1982 to 1991.

Lønningdal was a member of the Conservative Party central board from 1969 to 1974. She was a board member of Stavanger Boligbyggelag from 1963 to 1973, of Stavanger Hospital from 1964 (deputy chair from 1971 to 1973) and a deputy board member of Den Norske Stats Oljeselskap from 1968 to 1976.

Government offices
Preceded by Konrad Birger Knutsen	County Governor of Rogaland; 1982–1991	Succeeded by Harald Thune (acting for Tora Haug)
