= Otto Grieg Tidemand =

Norwegian politician

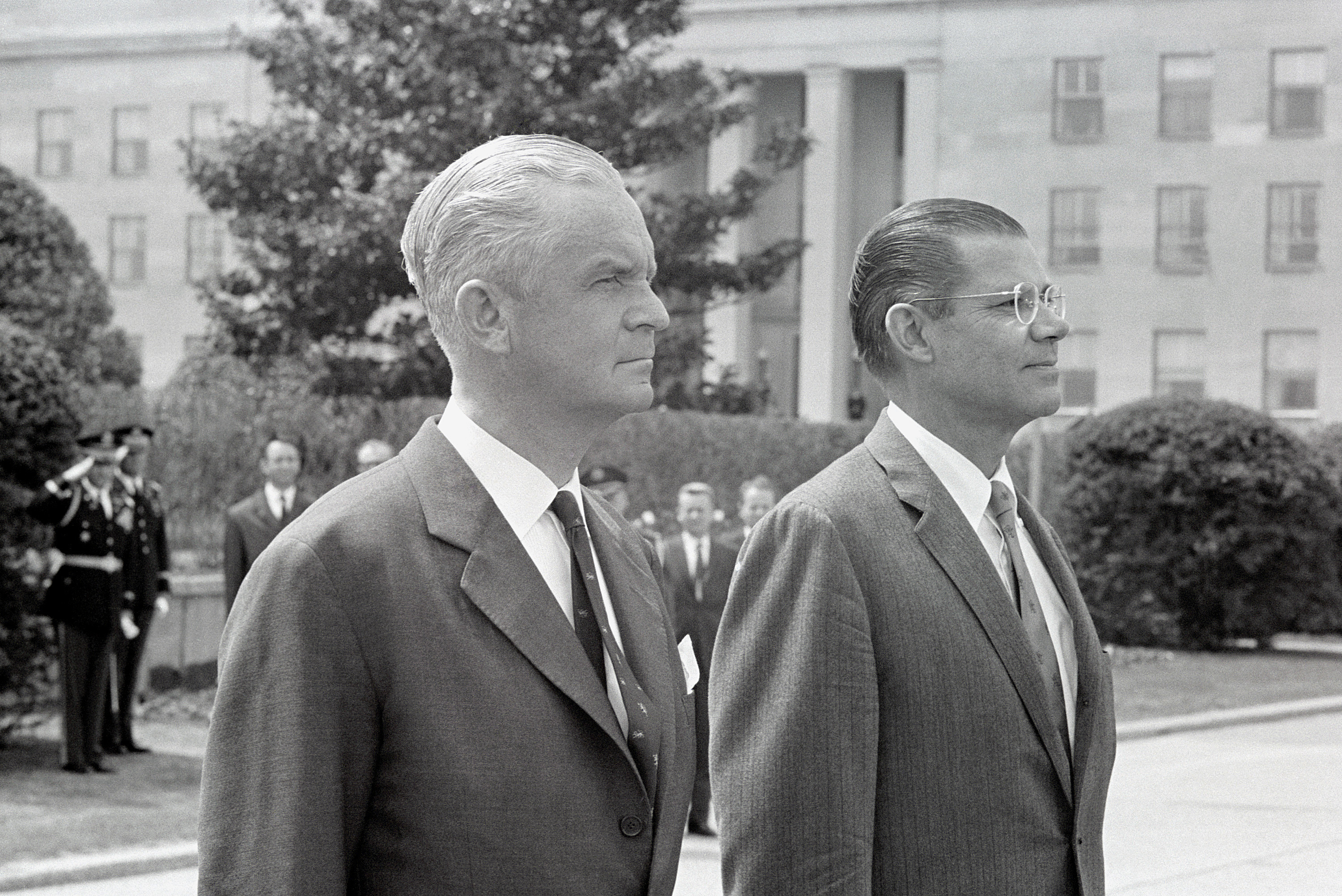
- Tidemand with Robert McNamara in 1966.

Minister of Defence
- In office 12 October 1965 – 5 June 1970
- Prime Minister: Per Borten
- Preceded by: Gudmund Harlem
- Succeeded by: Gunnar Hellesen

Minister of Trade and Shipping
- In office 5 June 1970 – 17 March 1971
- Prime Minister: Per Borten
- Preceded by: Kåre Willoch
- Succeeded by: Per Kleppe

Personal details
- Born: 18 June 1921 Oslo, Norway
- Died: 10 June 2006 (aged 84) Oslo, Norway
- Party: Conservative
- Spouse: Karin Lorentzen (m. 1948)

Otto Grieg Tidemand (18 June 1921, Oslo – 10 June 2006, Oslo) was a Norwegian politician for the Conservative Party. He served as Minister of Defence from 1965 to 1970 and Minister of Trade and Shipping from 1970 to 1971.

== Military service ==
During the Second World War, he served as a fighter pilot with the Royal Norwegian Air Force from 1942 to 1946, after training at a flying school in Canada. He was posted to No. 332 Squadron RAF (known as the Norwegian Squadron). While a sergeant pilot under training in England on 8 June 1943, he crashlanded his training plane near Ellesmere, Shropshire but survived unhurt. He flew Spitfires on offensive sweeps in Northwestern Europe and was credited with destroying one German Focke-Wulf Fw 190 and sharing in the downing of a Messerschmitt 410.

== Political career ==
From 1965 to 5 June 1970 he served as the Minister of Defence during the Per Borten cabinet. On that date, he was appointed Minister of Trade and Shipping, which he held until the Borten cabinet fell in 1971.

== Business career ==
He held numerous board memberships in Norwegian corporations, notably serving as chairman of the board of Saga Petroleum (1972-1976), Atlas Copco Norway (1978-1997), Vesta Hygea (1984-1986), Fina Norway (1981-1996) and Store Norske Spitsbergen Kulkompani (1982-1987). He was a member of the Steering Committee of the Bilderberg Group and participated in all their yearly conferences between 1967 and 1980 as well as in 1982 and 1984.

== Decorations ==
- Haakon VII 70th Anniversary Medal 1943
- Distinguished Flying Cross (United Kingdom) 1944
- War Medal (Norway) 1944
- St. Olav's Medal with Oak Branch 1945
- Defence Medal 1940-1945 1945
- Order of Merit of the Federal Republic of Germany 1970
- Commander of the Order of the Polar Star (Sweden) (first class) 1990
- Commander of the Order of Leopold (Belgium) 1997

== Sports interests ==
Tidemand was president of the Norwegian Golf Federation from 1962 to 1965.

Preceded by Gudmund Harlem	Minister of Defence (Norway); 1965–1970	Succeeded by Gunnar Hellesen
Preceded by Kåre Willoch	Minister of Trade and Shipping (Norway); 1970–1971	Succeeded by Per Andreas Kleppe
