= Daniel Bremer Juell Koren =

Norwegian politician

Governor of Lister og Mandal
- In office 1907–1928
- Preceded by: Hans Georg Jacob Stang
- Succeeded by: Hagbarth Lund

Personal details
- Born: 12 March 1858 Mandal, Norway
- Died: 10 July 1948 (aged 90) Kristiansand, Norway
- Citizenship: Norway
- Profession: Politician

Daniel Bremer Juell Koren (1858–1948) was a Norwegian civil servant and politician. He served as the County Governor of Vest-Agder county from 1907 until 1928 and also as the last Diocesan Governor of Kristiansand from 1907 until 1919 when that office was abolished.

Government offices
Preceded by Hans Georg Jacob Stang	County Governor of Lister og Mandals amt 1907–1928 (Title changed to County Governor of Vest-Agder in 1919)	Succeeded by Hagbarth Lund
Preceded by Hans Georg Jacob Stang	Diocesan Governor of Kristiansand stiftamt 1907–1918	Office abolished
