= Thorvald Andreas Larsen =

Norwegian politician

Governor of Stavanger amt
- In office 1910–1932
- Preceded by: Carl Lauritz Mechelborg Oppen
- Succeeded by: John Norem

Personal details
- Born: 27 September 1863 Sandnes, Norway
- Died: 16 January 1936 (aged 72) Norway
- Citizenship: Norway
- Profession: Politician

Thorvald Andreas Larsen (27 September 1863–16 January 1936) was a Norwegian lawyer, police chief, banker, civil servant, and politician.

He was born in Sandnes as a son of merchant and magistrate Andreas Larsen and his wife Charlotte Marie Sandved. He finished his secondary education in 1881, and graduated with the cand.jur. degree in 1886. He started as a lawyer, and in 1892 he became a barrister with access to working with cases at the Supreme Court. In 1898, he was appointed as Stavanger's chief of police and also director of Stavanger Handels- og Industribank.

He was a member of Stavanger city council from 1896 to 1904, and of the Stavanger school board from 1899 to 1904. He resigned in 1904 as he was appointed as burgomaster of Stavanger, the position which is now called chief administrative officer. While serving as burgomaster he was elected as a deputy representative of the Parliament of Norway from the constituency of Holmen in the 1906 Norwegian parliamentary election. He served one term through 1909. He went on to become County Governor of Stavanger amt in 1910. He held that position until 1932.

He died in 1936 and was buried at Eiganes.

Government offices
Preceded by Carl Lauritz Mechelborg Oppen	County Governor of Stavanger amt 1910–1932 (County was renamed as Rogaland in 1919)	Succeeded by John Norem
