= Jens Erichstrup =

Norwegian politician (1775–1826)

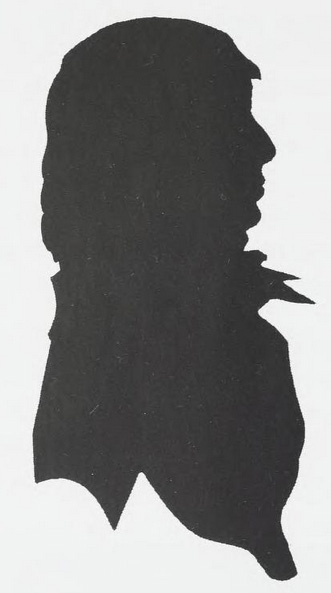
Jens Erichstrup

Jens Erichstrup (10 November 1775 – 18 August 1826) was a Norwegian jurist and elected official. He served as a representative at the Norwegian Constitutional Assembly at Eidsvoll Manor in 1814.

Jens Erichstrup was born in Skien in Telemark, Norway. He received an education in law and graduated as cand.jur. in 1798. From 1801 to 1810 he worked in the Treasury (Rentekammeret), the first two years as copyist, later as proxy. He was appointed bailiff (foged) of Lister in Vest-Agder during 1810. He was elected to the Norwegian Constituent Assembly in 1814, representing the constituency of Lister Amt, together with Gabriel Lund and Teis Lundegaard. At Eidsvoll, he supported the position of the union party (Unionspartiet).

In 1818, he was appointed bailiff in Laurvig. He was also elected in 1818 as a representative from Lister og Mandals amt (now Vest-Agder) to the Norwegian Parliament where he served as secretary on the election and the budget committees. He subsequently became acting County Governor of Jarlsbergs og Laurvigs Amt. While serving there, he was elected to the Norwegian Parliament in 1821 as a representative from Laurvig Grevskab (now Larvik) and in 1824 representing Jarlsberg og Laurviks amt (now Vestfold). Erichstrup was then County Governor of Stavanger Amt (now Rogaland) from 1825 until his death.

== Related Reading ==
- Holme, Jørn (2014). De kom fra alle kanter - Eidsvollsmennene og deres hus. Oslo: Cappelen Damm. ISBN 9788202445645.

Government offices
Preceded by Wilhelm Frimann Krog	County Governor of Stavanger Amt; 1825–1826	Succeeded by Peder Martinius Ottesen
