= Gunnar Fredrik Hellesen =

Norwegian politician (1913–2005)

Gunnar Hellesen

County Governor of Rogaland
- In office 1968–1973
- Monarch: Olav V
- Prime Minister: Per Borten; Trygve Bratteli; Lars Korvald
- Preceded by: Paul Ingebretsen
- Succeeded by: Konrad B. Knutsen

Minister of Defence
- In office 5 June 1970 – 17 March 1971
- Prime Minister: Per Borten
- Preceded by: Otto G. Tidemand
- Succeeded by: Alv Jakob Fostervoll

Member of the Norwegian Parliament
- In office 1 October 1961 – 30 September 1969
- Constituency: Rogaland

Personal details
- Born: 23 February 1913 Haugesund, Rogaland, Norway
- Died: 7 July 2005 (aged 92) Haugesund, Rogaland, Norway
- Party: Conservative

Gunnar Fredrik Hellesen (23 February 1913 – 7 July 2005) was a Norwegian politician for the Conservative Party.

He was born in Haugesund.

He was elected to the Norwegian Parliament from Rogaland in 1961, and was re-elected on one occasion. He had previously served in the position of deputy representative during the term 1958–1961.

On 5 June 1970, he was appointed Minister of Defence during the centre-right cabinet Borten, replacing Otto Grieg Tidemand who on the same day became Minister of Trade and Shipping. Hellesen held the position until the cabinet Borten fell in 1971.

Hellesen was a member of Haugesund city council from 1945 to 1963, serving as mayor in from 1955 to 1959. He served as County Governor of Rogaland from 1968 to 1973.

Political offices
Preceded by Otto Grieg Tidemand	Minister of Defence (Norway); 1970–1971	Succeeded by Alv Jakob Fostervoll
Preceded by Paul Ingebretsen	County Governor of Rogaland; 1968–1973	Succeeded by Konrad B. Knutsen
