= Anna Stang =

Norwegian politician (1834–1901)

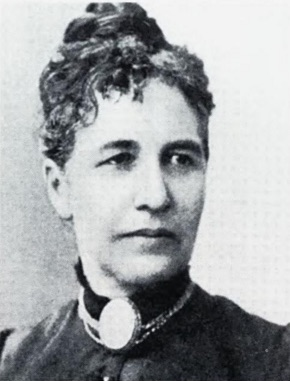
- Anna Stang circa 1870–1890

2nd President of the Norwegian Association for Women's Rights
- In office 1885–1886
- Preceded by: Hagbart Berner
- Succeeded by: Ragna Nielsen

Personal details
- Born: May 18, 1834
- Died: December 23, 1901 (aged 67)
- Party: Liberal Party
- Spouse: Jacob Stang

Anna Stang (May 18, 1834 – December 23, 1901), née Anna Sophie Margrethe Holmsen, was a Norwegian feminist, liberal politician and the second President of the Norwegian Association for Women's Rights, serving from 1885 to 1886. She also ran a private school in Kongsvinger for 17 years. She was married to Norwegian Prime Minister Jacob Stang, and was therefore for the rest of her life addressed as "Madam Prime Minister" (Norwegian: Statsministerinde). She was the mother of Minister of Defence Georg Stang.
