= Frederik Otto Scheel =

Norwegian military officer (1748–1803)

Frederik Otto Scheel (15 July 1748 – 22 May 1803) was a Norwegian military officer and civil servant.

He was born in Christiania (now Oslo), Norway. He belonged to a noble family with strong military traditions. He was the son of Major General Hans Jacob Scheel (1714–74) and Catharine Christine Brügman (1725-1800).

He served from 1762 to 1769 with the Sønnafjelske Dragonregiment and then with the Søndenfjelske Gevorbne Infanteriregiment. He served as County Governor of Stavanger Amt (now Rogaland county) from 1785 to 1799, and is particularly remembered for his contribution to road construction in the district. His efforts expanded the royal road from Stavanger and Jæren.

Scheel had six children with his wife, Dorthe Falk Dedekam (1769-1796) who came from a merchant family in Arendal. He was the father of military officer and weapon designer Frederik Wilhelm Scheel (1795-1870). He died at Stavanger in 1803.

Government offices
Preceded by Peter Frederik Ulrik Benzon	County Governor of Stavanger Amt; 1785–1799	Succeeded by Ulrich Wilhelm Koren
