= Henrik Harboe =

Norwegian civil servant and government official (1784–1848)

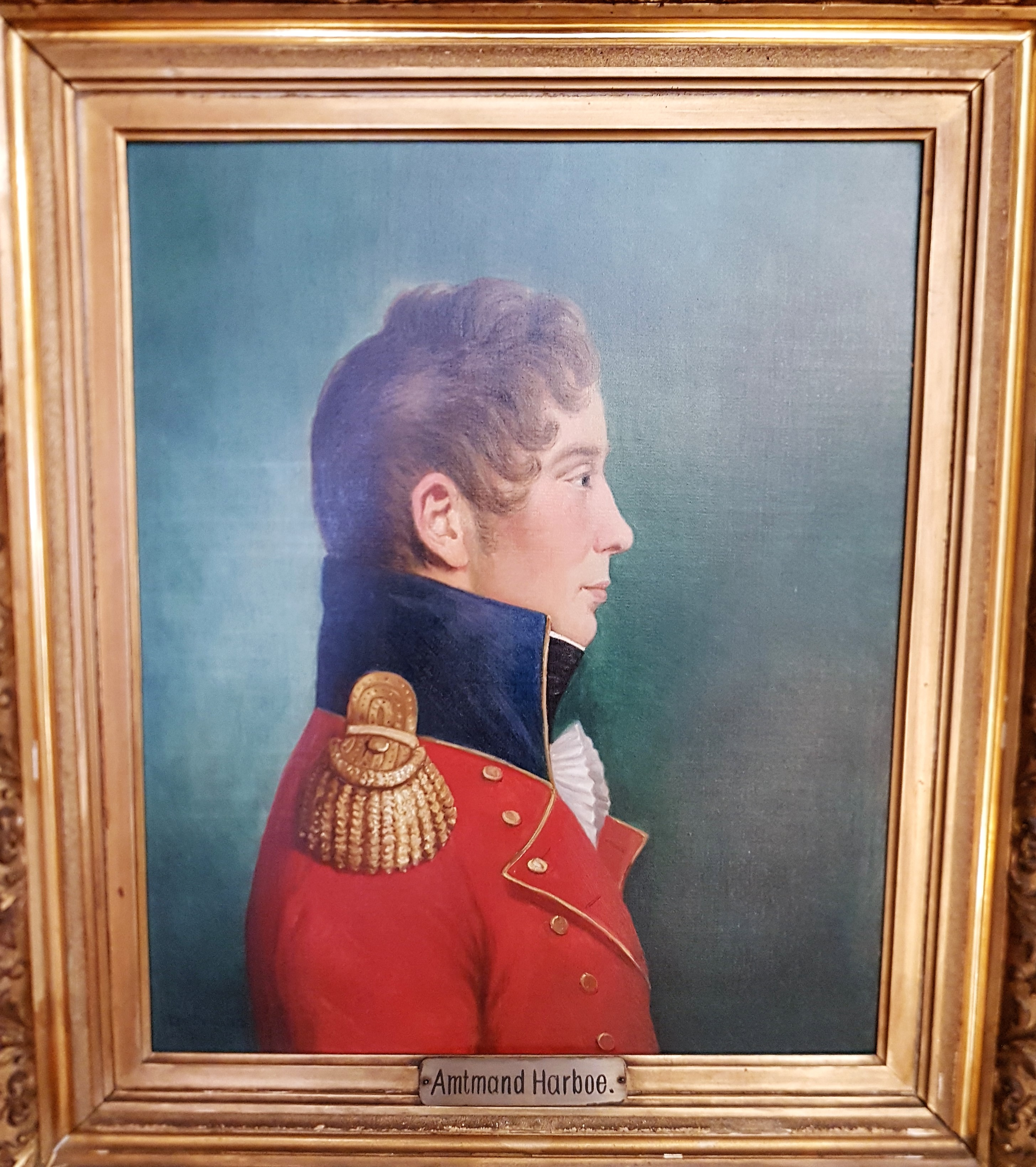

Governor of Nedenæs amt
- In office 1837–1848

Personal details
- Born: 1 May 1784 Copenhagen, Denmark
- Died: 9 December 1848 (aged 64) Arendal, Norway
- Citizenship: Denmark-Norway
- Profession: Politician

Henrik Harboe (1784–1848) was a Norwegian civil servant and government official. He served as the County Governor of Nedenæs county from 1837 until 1848.

Harboe received his Cand.jur. degree in 1803. Later that same year he was an auditor in the Norwegian Artillery Brigade, with the title Chief Auditor. In 1814 he was appointed to be the bailiff in Buskerud, and on 19 April 1837 he became County Governor for Nedenæs amt.

The parents were Colonel Jacob Harboe (1736–1824) and Cecilia Marie Meyer. He married Danish-born Julie Gertrude Mourier (1790–1840) in 1810. Her father was Ferdinand Louis Mourier, a Swiss professor and priest. Henrik and Cecilia lived in Arendal during his time as governor. They had 7 children including Edvard Henrich Waldemar Harboe (1815–1894) and Lorentz Julius Torvald Harboe (1828–1867).

Government offices
Preceded by Ulrik Frederik Anton de Schouboe	County Governor of Nedenæs amt 1837–1848	Succeeded by Iver Steen Thomle
