= Johan Christian Georg Hvoslef =

Norwegian civil servant and lawyer

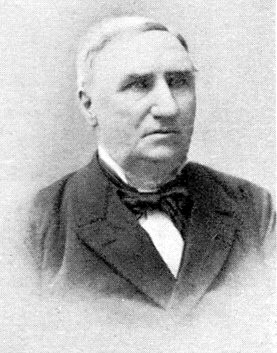

Governor of Lister og Mandals amt
- In office 1882–1889
- Preceded by: Jakob Krefting Bonnevie
- Succeeded by: Hans Georg Jacob Stang

Governor of Jarlsberg og Laurvigs amt
- In office 1865–1882
- Preceded by: Ulrik Frederik Cappelen
- Succeeded by: Carl Johan Michelet

Personal details
- Born: 13 February 1819 Stavern, Norway
- Died: 7 June 1889 (aged 70) Kristiansand, Norway
- Citizenship: Norway
- Children: Anna Hvoslef
- Relatives: Fredrik Waldemar Hvoslef
- Education: Cand. jur. (1843)
- Profession: Lawyer

Johan Christian Georg Hvoslef (1819–1889) was a Norwegian civil servant and lawyer. He served as the County Governor of Jarlsberg og Laurvig and Lister og Mandal counties.

He received his cand. jur. degree in 1843. Soon afterwards, he was hired as a clerk and later an acting judge in Indre Sogn. In 1851 he was a court prosecutor in Lærdalsøyri. From 1856, he was town bailiff in Hammerfest. In 1865, he was appointed County Governor of Jarlsberg og Laurvigs amt. He held that post from 1865 until 1882. In 1882, he was appointed as the Diocesan Governor of Kristianssand stiftamt as well as the County Governor of Lister og Mandals amt. He held that post until his death in 1889.

Johan C.G. Hvoslef was the son of Judge Jens Hvoslef and his wife Elisabeth Christine Mejlænder and the brother of Bishop Fredrik Waldemar Hvoslef who is known from the Kautokeino Uprising. In 1865, he married Amalie Eline Weidemann from Holmestrand. Anna Hvoslef was his daughter.

He was appointed a knight of the Order of St. Olav in 1868 for his meritorious service.

Government offices
Preceded by Ulrik Frederik Cappelen	County Governor of Jarlsberg og Laurvigs amt 1865–1882	Succeeded by Carl Johan Michelet
Preceded by Jakob Krefting Bonnevie	Diocesan Governor of Kristianssand stiftamt 1882–1889	Succeeded by Hans Georg Jacob Stang
Preceded by Jakob Krefting Bonnevie	County Governor of Lister og Mandals amt 1882–1889	Succeeded by Hans Georg Jacob Stang
