= Wilhelm Frimann Krog =

Norwegian civil servant and politician (1767–1825)

Governor of Stavanger Amt
- In office 1814–1824
- Preceded by: Ulrik Frederik Anton de Schouboe
- Succeeded by: Jens Erichstrup

Personal details
- Born: 10 May 1767 Skudenes, Denmark-Norway
- Died: 16 April 1825 (aged 57) Stavanger, Denmark-Norway
- Citizenship: Denmark-Norway
- Profession: Politician

Wilhelm Frimann Krog (1767–1825) was a Norwegian civil servant and politician. He served as the County Governor of Stavanger county from 1814 until 1824.

== Biography ==
From 1799 until 1805, he was the Sysselmann (Governor) for Hunevad county in Iceland. From 1805 to 1814, he was the bailiff for Jæren and Dalane. Then from 1814 to 1824 he was the Governor of Stavanger Amt.

Krog was the son of Truls Christian Krog (1722–1806), the parish priest at Falnes Church, and Helene Sophie Meyer. He married Drude Marie Heiberg in 1801 and together, they had 8 children.

Government offices
Preceded by Ulrik Frederik Anton de Schouboe	County Governor of Stavanger Amt; 1814–1824	Succeeded by Jens Erichstrup
