= John Norem =

Norwegian barrister and politician

Governor of Rogaland
- In office 1932–1958
- Preceded by: Thorvald Andreas Larsen
- Succeeded by: Paul Ingolf Ingebretsen

Personal details
- Born: 11 November 1888 Stavanger, Norway
- Died: 12 May 1976 (aged 87) Norway
- Citizenship: Norway
- Party: Conservative Party
- Education: Cand.jur.
- Profession: Politician

John Norem (11 November 1888 – 12 May 1976) was a Norwegian barrister and politician. He was a member of the Storting from 1925 to 1933, and County Governor of Rogaland from 1933 to 1958 (except during the German occupation).

== Personal life ==
Norem was born in Stavanger to merchant Johan Conrad von der Lippe Norem and Ingeborg Johnsen. In 1912, he married Sofie Meyer Falck, a sister of Thomas Scheen Falck. His first wife died in 1919, and in 1926 he married Thora Margrethe Bjelland, daughter of consul and canning industry pioneer Christian Bjelland.

== Career ==
Norem graduated as cand.jur. in 1912, and worked as barrister in Stavanger from 1912 to 1932. He was member of the municipal council of Stavanger from 1917. He was vice mayor from 1920 to 1922, and mayor from 1922 to 1924.

He was elected representative to the Stortinget for the Market towns of Vest-Agder and Rogaland counties constituency during the years 1925–1927, 1928–1930, and 1931–1933, representing the Conservative Party. From 1932 to 1958 he was the County Governor of Rogaland, although from 1941 to 1945 the occupied government replaced him with Alf Skjegstad Krog. After the war, the legitimate government of Norway reinstated him as Governor.

He was decorated Knight, First Class of the Order of St. Olav in 1952. He died in May 1976.

Government offices
Preceded by Thorvald Andreas Larsen	County Governor of Rogaland; 1932–1958 (from 1941-1945, Alf Skjegstad Krog replaced him as governor by order of the WWII Occupied government)	Succeeded by Paul Ingolf Ingebretsen
