= Tora Aasland =

Norwegian politician (born 1942)

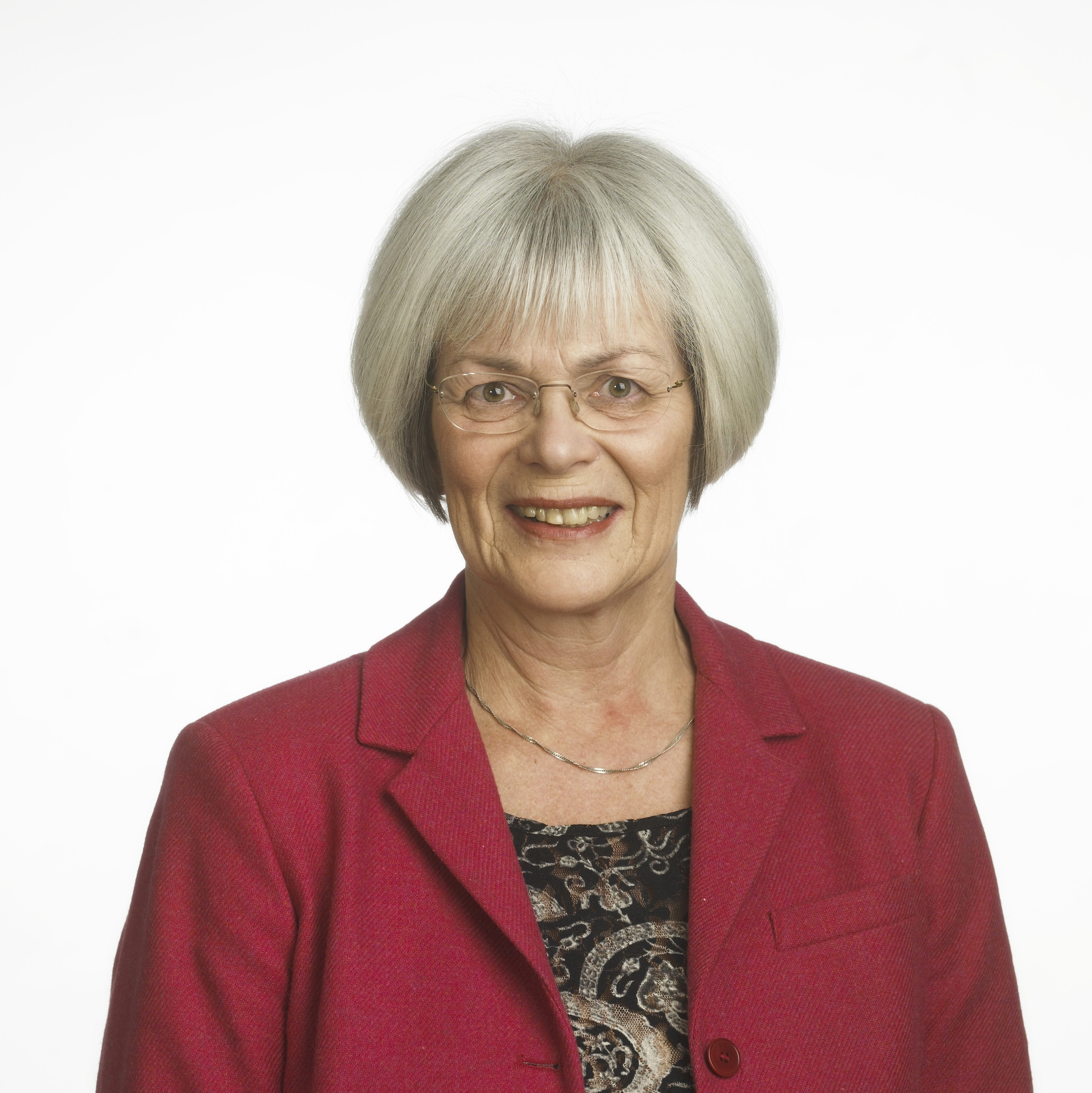
- Aasland in 2006

Minister of Research and Higher Education
- In office 18 October 2007 – 23 March 2012
- Prime Minister: Jens Stoltenberg
- Preceded by: Position established
- Succeeded by: Iselin Nybø (2018)

Member of the Norwegian Parliament
- In office 1 October 1985 – 30 September 1993
- Constituency: Akershus

Governor of Rogaland
- In office 23 March 2012 – 1 October 2013
- Preceded by: Harald Torfinn Thune (acting)
- Succeeded by: Magnhild Meltveit Kleppa
- In office 1 October 1993 – 18 October 2007
- Preceded by: Harald Torfinn Thune (acting)
- Succeeded by: Harald Thorfinn Thune (acting)

Vice President of the Odelsting
- In office 10 October 1989 – 30 September 1993
- President: Inger Lise Gjørv
- Preceded by: Kåre Kristiansen
- Succeeded by: Dag Jostein Fjærvoll

Personal details
- Born: 6 November 1942 (age 83) Skien, Telemark, Norway
- Party: Socialist Left

Tora Aasland (born 6 November 1942, in Skien) is a Norwegian politician for the Socialist Left Party. She served as the Minister of Research and Higher Education from 18 October 2007 to 23 March 2012 held the position as Minister for Research and Higher education 2007-2011.

== Career ==
She was a member of the Norwegian Parliament, representing Akershus, from 1985 to 1993. From 1991 to 2013, she served as the County Governor of Rogaland Career Aasland was a deputy member of the executive committee of Nesodden municipality council during the terms 1975–1979 and 1979–1983.

== Education ==
Aasland has a cand.sociol. degree in sociology and was a researcher at the Norwegian Institute for Social Research from 1976 to 1982, and its acting director from 1980 to 1981. She has cited Vilhelm Aubert as her largest influence.

Government offices
Preceded by Kristin Lønningdal	County Governor of Rogaland; 1991–2013 (Harald Thune was acting governor for her from 1991-1993 and 2007-2012)	Succeeded by Magnhild Meltveit Kleppa
