= Ulrich Wilhelm Koren =

Norwegian civil servant and politician

Governor of Stavanger Amt
- In office 1799–1810
- Preceded by: Frederik Otto Scheel
- Succeeded by: Oluf Borch de Schouboe

Personal details
- Born: 4 April 1747 Bergen, Denmark-Norway
- Died: 9 February 1826 (aged 78) Bergen, Norway
- Citizenship: Denmark-Norway
- Profession: Politician

Ulrich Wilhelm Koren (1747–1826) was a Norwegian civil servant and politician. He served as the bailiff of Sunnhordland and the county governor of Stavanger amt from 1799 until 1810.

He was the son of skipper and merchant in Bergen Niels Koren (1718–1784) and Kirstine Theting (1727–1779). He was first married on 20 May 1779 to Elisabeth Catharina Hagemann (1755–1789), daughter of Lieutenant Colonel Baltzar Christian Hagemann and Anne Marie Schmidt. She died in 1789 and then on 17 March 1790, he married Maren Laurentze Stub (1773–1804), daughter of parish priest Paul Schonevig Stub and Alida Elisabeth Abel.

Koren began working for a judge in Sunnhordland in 1763. In 1776, he became the acting judge for Sunnhordland while the judgeship was temporarily vacant. The same year he was also appointed bailiff for Sunnhordland. He served in that role until 1799 when he was appointed Governor of Stavanger Amt. He held that role until 1810 when he retired.

He was given the rank of Justice Councilor in 1795 and became a knight of the Order of the Dannebrog in 1812.

Government offices
Preceded by Frederik Otto Scheel	County Governor of Stavanger Amt; 1799–1810	Succeeded by Oluf Borch de Schouboe
