= Harald Thune =

Norwegian civil servant

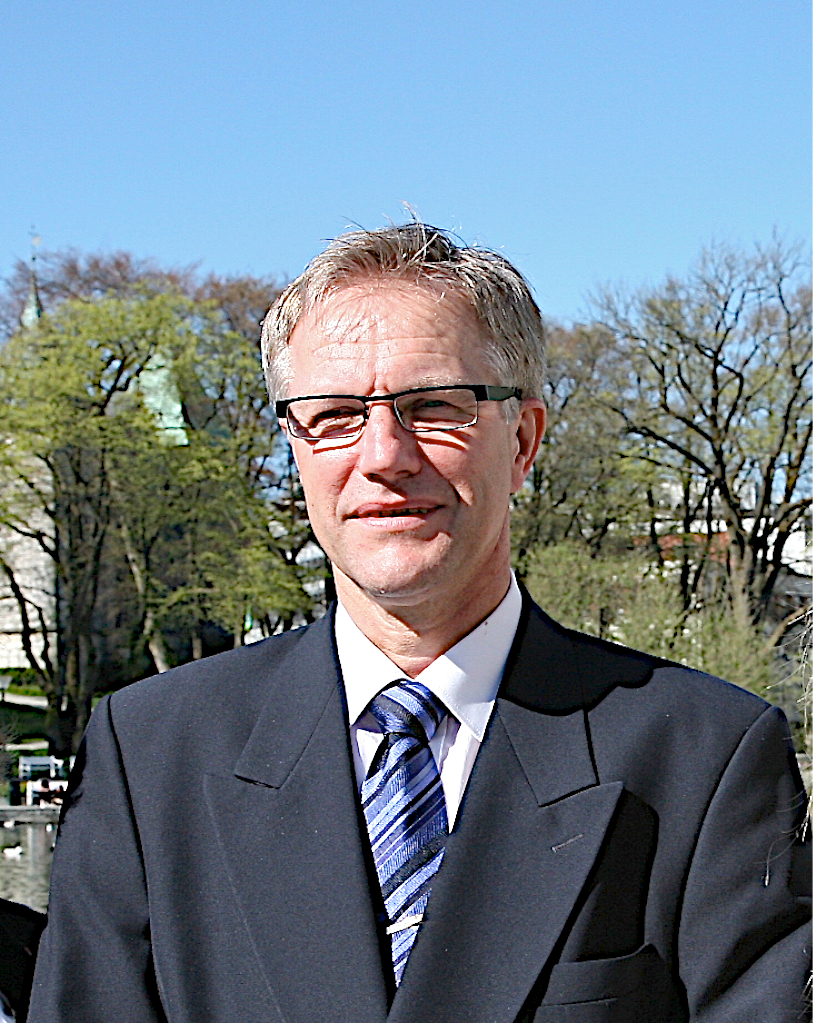
Harald Torfinn Thune

Harald Torfinn Thune (born 12 May 1952) is a Norwegian civil servant.

He was born in Gulen Municipality. He took his education at the University of Bergen, graduating with the cand.jur. degree in 1978. He then embarked on a career as a civil servant.

Thune was hired in the County Governor's Office in Rogaland in 1986. From December 1991 to August 1993 he was acting County Governor, as Tora Aasland had been appointed in 1991 but served as a member of Parliament until 1993. In 2007, when Aasland was appointed to the Stoltenberg's Second Cabinet, Thune was appointed as acting County Governor again.

Government offices
Preceded by Kristin Lønningdal	Acting County Governor of Rogaland; 1991–1993	Succeeded by Tora Aasland
Preceded by Tora Aasland	Acting County Governor of Rogaland; 2007–2012	Succeeded by Tora Aasland
