= List of county governors of Rogaland =

The county governor of Rogaland county in Norway represents the central government administration in the county. The office of county governor is a government agency of the Kingdom of Norway; the title was Amtmann (before 1919), then Fylkesmann (from 1919 to 2020), and then Statsforvalteren (since 2021).

Stavanger amt was established in 1671. In 1838, the border between Stavanger amt and neighboring Lister og Mandals amt was moved slightly to the west to accommodate the new municipal structure that was set forth in the formannskapsdistrikt law. In 1919, the name of the county was changed to Rogaland fylke. In 2002, Ølen Municipality was transferred from Hordaland county into Rogaland county.

The county governor is the government's representative in the county. The governor carries out the resolutions and guidelines of the Storting and government. This is done first by the county governor performing administrative tasks on behalf of the ministries. Secondly, the county governor also monitors the activities of the municipalities and is the appeal body for many types of municipal decisions.

== Names ==
The word for county (amt or fylke) has changed over time. From 1671 until 1918 the title was Amtmann i Stavanger amt. On 1 January 1919, the title was Fylkesmann i Rogaland. On 1 January 2021, the title was again changed to the gender-neutral Statsforvalteren i Rogaland.

== List of county governors ==
Rogaland county has had the following governors:

County governors of Rogaland
Start	End	Name
1671	1673	Henrik Below (16??–1674)
1673	1683	Ludvig Holgersen Rosenkrantz (1628–1685)
1683	1687	Daniel Knoff (1648–1703)
1687	1700	Christian Frederik Pogwisch (1650–1711)
1700	1710	Edvard Hammond (1668–1711)
1710	1714	Ulrik Christian Mese (16??–1714)
1714	1726	Hans Nobel d.y. (1684–1752)
1726	1746	Bendix Christian de Fine (1696–1746)
1746	1761	Henrik Wilhelm Tillisch (1720–1761)
1762	1768	Henrik Lachmann (1738–1797)
1768	1772	Gunder Gundersen Hammer (1725–1772)
1772	1781	Vilhelm Mathias Skeel (1746–1817)
1781	1785	Peter Frederik Ulrik Benzon (1760–1840)
1785	1799	Frederik Otto Scheel (1748–1803)
1799	1810	Ulrich Wilhelm Koren (1747–1826)
1810	1812	Oluf Borch de Schouboe (1777–1844)
1812	1814	Ulrik Fredrik Anton de Schouboe (1782–1863)
1814	1824	Wilhelm Frimann Krog (1767–1825)
1825	1826	Jens Erichstrup (1775–1826)
1826	1828	Peder Martinius Ottesen (1782–1852)
1829	1833	Christian Ulrik Kastrup (1784–1850)
1833	1853	Gunder Aas (1785–1853)
1853	1863	Anton Theodor Harris (1804–1866)
1864	1888	Vilhelm Ludvig Herman von Munthe af Morgenstierne (1814–1888)
1889	1910	Carl Lauritz Mechelborg Oppen (1830–1914)
1910	1932	Thorvald Andreas Larsen (1863–1936)
1932	1958	John Norem (1888–1976)
July 1941	May 1945	Alf Skjegstad Krog (born 1895) (WWII Occupied government)
1959	1968	Paul Ingolf Ingebretsen (1904–1968)
1968	1973	Gunnar Fredrik Hellesen (1913–2005)
1973	1982	Konrad Birger Knutsen (1925–2012)
1982	1991	Kristin Kverneland Lønningdal (1923–2010)
1991	1 Oct 1993	Harald Thune (born 1952); Acting governor for Aasland while she finished her Parliamentary term.
1991	31 Oct 2013	Tora (Haug) Aasland (born 1942)
18 Oct 2007	23 Mar 2012	Harald Thune (born 1952); Acting governor for Aasland while she was serving in the Cabinet.
1 Nov 2013	30 June 2019	Magnhild Meltveit Kleppa (born 1948)
1 July 2019	31 Oct 2021	Lone Merethe Solheim (born 1964); Acting governor for Høie while he finishes his term in Parliament.
1 July 2019	present	Bent Høie (born 1971)
