= Adam Ditlev Wedell-Wedellsborg =

Dano-Norwegian government official

Baron Adam Ditlev Wedell-Wedellsborg

Governor of Lister og Mandals amt
- In office 1810–1814

Personal details
- Born: 1 November 1782 Wedellsborg, Funen, Denmark-Norway
- Died: 3 September 1827 (aged 44) Kerte, Assens, Denmark
- Citizenship: Denmark-Norway
- Education: Cand.jur.

Adam Ditlev Wedell-Wedellsborg (1782-1827) was a Dano-Norwegian government official. He served as the County Governor of Lister og Mandal amt from 1810 until 1814. When he got the governorship he was only 28 years old. He was a baron and a member of the Wedel family, an old noble family from Germany. When the union between Denmark and Norway ended in 1814, he resigned as governor, left Norway and moved to Denmark. He died in the town of Assens in 1827, at only 44 years old.

Government offices
Preceded by Hans Vilhelm Cederfeld de Simonsen	County Governor of Lister og Mandals amt 1810–1814	Succeeded by Ulrik Frederik Anton de Schouboe
