= Jens Stoud =

Norwegian government official (1719–1768)

Governor of Lister og Mandals amt
- In office 1745–1768

Personal details
- Born: 8 January 1719 Norway
- Died: 19 February 1768 (aged 49) Christianssand, Norway
- Citizenship: Norway

Jens Stoud (1719–1768) was a Norwegian government official. He served as the County Governor of Lister og Mandal county from 1745 until 1768.

Government offices
Preceded by Vilhelm Reesen	County Governor of Lister og Mandals amt 1745–1768	Succeeded by Magnus Theiste
