= Peter Ulrich Frederik Benzon =

Norwegian civil servant and politician

Peter Frederik Ulrik Benzon
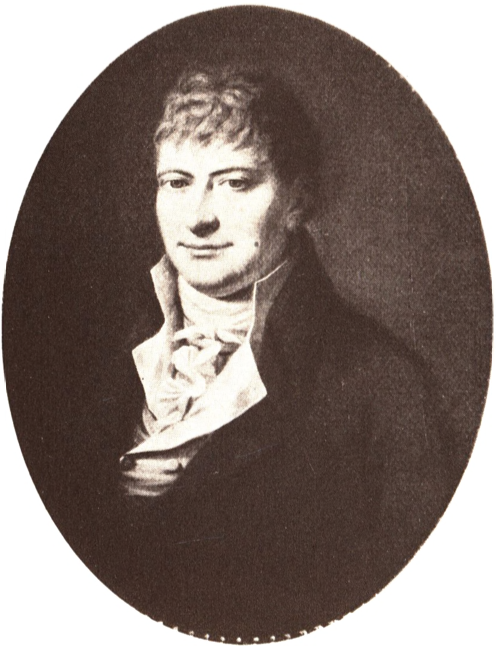

Governor of Stavangers amt
- In office 1781–1785

Personal details
- Born: 6 November 1760 Odense, Denmark
- Died: 27 January 1840 (aged 79) Odense, Denmark
- Citizenship: Denmark-Norway

Peter Ulrich Frederik Benzon (11 June 1760 – 21. January 1840) was a Danish jurist and landowner. He spent four years in Norway, then part of Denmark-Norway, as County governor of Stavanger. After his return to Denmark, he settled on the Christiansdal estate on Funen.

== Early life and education ==
Benzon was born in Odense to colonel-lieutenant Christian Benzon (died 1801) and Albertine Christine von Benzon. His father held the entailed properties Stamhuset Cathrineberg and Stamhuset Christiansdal. Benzon was appointed to kammerjunker in 1777 and the next year to gofjunker. In 1779, he earned an Exam. Juris degree from the University of Copenhagen.

== Years in Norway, 1781–1785 ==
In 1781, when he was just 21 years old, Benzon was appointed as chamberlain (kammerherre) and, by cabinet order, as county governor of Stavanger. This was an unusual posting for a 21-year-old man, especially since Christian Colbjørnsen, a much more qualified jurist, was also among the applicants, but he had connections in the royal court.

He served in Stavanger until his resignation in 1785 due to his wife's health. It is said that she could not tolerate the colder climate in Stavanger and needed to go back to Denmark.

== Property ==
In 1801, he came into possession of the Tirsbækske Fideikommis. In 1804, he ceded it to his brother, Jakov Benzon, in exchange for Christiansdal on Funen.

== Personal life ==
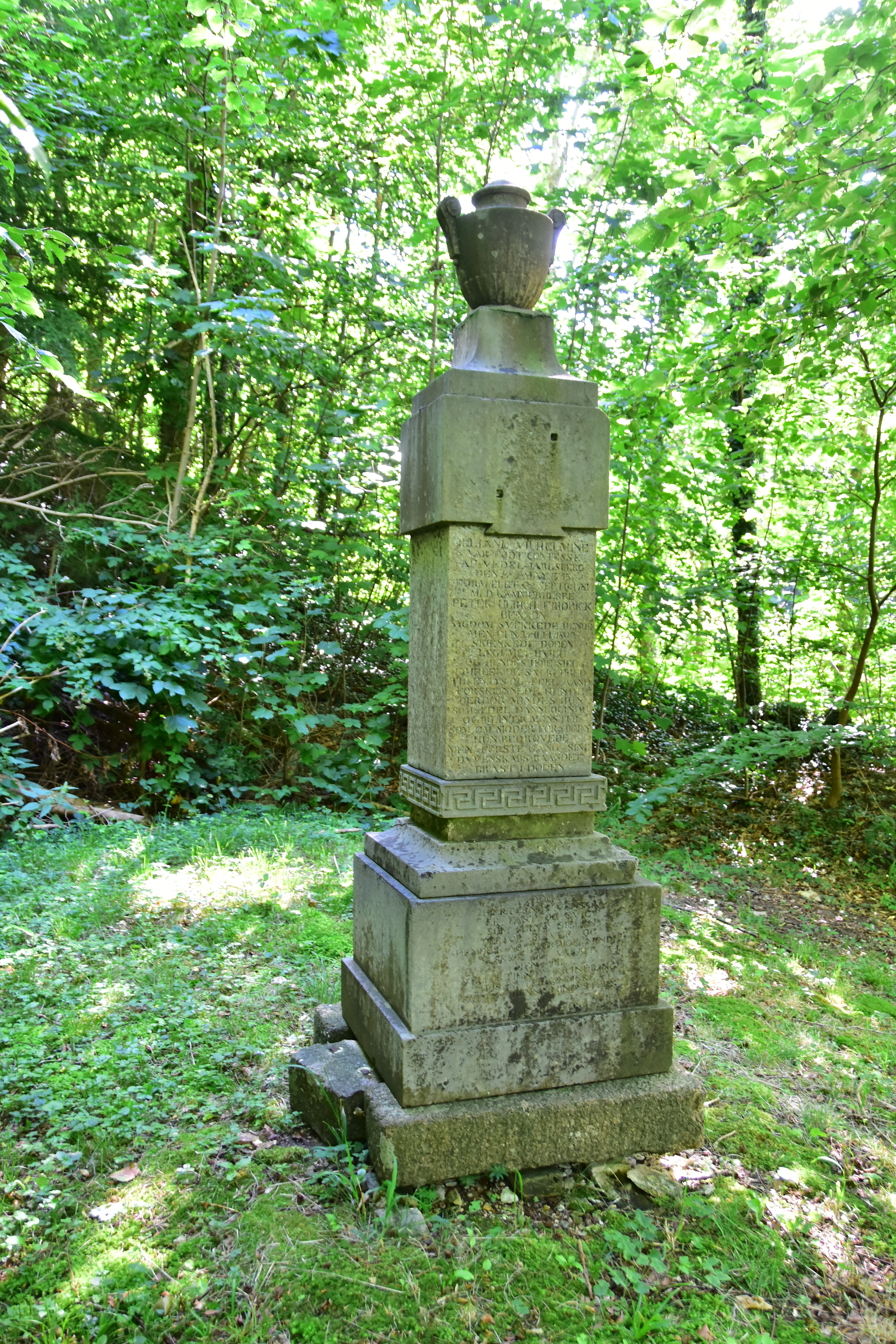
Benzon's monument to his first wife in the garden of Tirsbæk Manor.

Benzon married Juliane Wilhelmine Wedel-Jarlsberg (1753–1802) on 4 September 1781. She was a daughter of Count Frederik Christian Otto Wedel-Jarlsberg and Sophie née Huitfeldt. The couple had a son and a daughter. She died in 1802 and was buried under a marble monument in the garden at Tirsbæk Manor. The monument features a long inscription.

After her death, he was married to Frederica Edel Benedicta Brüggemann (1777–1846), a daughter of colonel Nicolai Brüggemann and Vibeke Marie née Pentz. Their wedding took place on 19 October 1805. He and Frederica had another son.

Through both of his marriages, he had one daughter and two sons. His daughter, Juliane Christiane Vilhelmine Christiane Wilhelmina Benzon, was married to Ferdinand Carl Maria Wedel-Jarlsberg. His eldest son, Christian Frederik Otto Benzon, was married to Nielsine de Jermiin, a daughter of Niels Thomasen de Jermiin, through whom he became the owner Lønborggaardof. His younger son, Jens von Benzon, by his second wife, became an army major and post master. He was married to Sophie Marie Albertine Ahlefeldt, daughter of Cai Georg Wilhelm Ahlefeldt-Dehn and Johanne von Heinen.

Government offices
Preceded by Vilhelm Mathias Skeel	Governor of Stavangers amt 1781–1785	Succeeded by Frederik Otto Scheel
