= List of county governors of Vest-Agder =

The county governor of Vest-Agder county in Norway represented the central government administration in the county. The office of county governor is a government agency of the Kingdom of Norway; the title was Amtmann (before 1919) and then Fylkesmann (after 1919). On 1 January 2016, the office was merged with the county governor of Aust-Agder into the county governor of Aust- og Vest-Agder in preparation for the merger of the two counties on 1 January 2020.

The diocesan county called Stavanger stiftamt was established in 1669 by the king and it had several subordinate counties (amt) including Agdesiden amt. In 1671, Agdesiden amt was divided into Lister og Mandals amt (later called Vest-Agder) and Nedenæs amt (later called Aust-Agder). In 1682, the Stavanger stiftamt headquarters was moved to the town of Christianssand and renamed Christianssand stiftamt. The seat of Lister og Mandals amt was also at Christianssand. In 1919, the county was renamed Vest-Agder. In 2020, Vest-Agder and Aust-Agder counties were merged into Agder county.

The county governor is the government's representative in the county. The governor carries out the resolutions and guidelines of the Storting and government. This is done first by the county governor performing administrative tasks on behalf of the ministries. Secondly, the county governor also monitors the activities of the municipalities and is the appeal body for many types of municipal decisions.

== Names ==
The word for county (amt or fylke) has changed over time as has the name of the county. From 1671 until 1918, the title was Amtmann i Lister og Mandals amt. From 1919 until 2016, the title was Fylkesmann i Vest-Agder fylke.

== List of county governors ==
Vest-Agder county has had the following governors:

County governors of Lister og Mandals amt
| Start | End | Name |
|---|---|---|
| 1671 | c. 1675 | Robert Hamilton |
| 1677 | 1681 | Jens Toller Rosenheim (1636–1690); Served concurrently as Amtmann for Nedenæs amt (1680-1681). |
| 1681 | 1683 | Daniel Danielsen Knoff (1614–1687) |
| 1683 | 1685 | Ludvig Holgersen Rosenkrantz (1625–1685); Served concurrently as Stiftamtmann for Christianssand stiftamt. |
| 1685 | 1692 | Christian Stockfleth (1640–1704); Served concurrently as Stiftamtmann for Christianssand stiftamt. |
| 1685 | 1692 | Claus Røyem (1638–1692) (Acting for Stockfleth while he served as envoy to Sweden.) |
| 1692 | 1699 | Jørgen Hansen Burchart |
| 1699 | 1711 | Andreas Undall (1669–1728) |
| 1711 | 1718 | Povel Juel (c. 1673–1723) (Suspended by the King from June 1713–January 1715; fired in 1718.) |
| 1718 | 1745 | Vilhelm Reesen (1675–1745) |
| 1745 | 1768 | Jens Stoud (1713–1768) |
| 1768 | 1771 | Magnus Theiste (1725–1791) |
| 1771 | 1773 | Frederik Georg Adeler (1736–1810) |
| 1773 | 1805 | Peter Holm (1733–1817) |
| 1805 | 1810 | Hans Vilhelm Cederfeld de Simonsen (1737–1836) |
| 1810 | 1814 | Adam Ditlev Wedell-Wedellsborg (1782–1827) |
| 1814 | 1815 | Ulrik Frederik Anton de Schouboe (1782–1863) |
| 1815 | 1836 | Oluf Borch de Schouboe (1777–1844); Served concurrently as Stiftamtmann for Christianssand stiftamt. |
| 1837 | 1846 | Niels Arntzen Sem (1782–1859); Served concurrently as Stiftamtmann for Christianssand stiftamt. |
| 1846 | 1852 | Carl Valentin Falsen (1787–1852); Served concurrently as Stiftamtmann for Christianssand stiftamt. |
| 1852 | 1859 | Mathias Bille Kjørboe (1794–1859); Served concurrently as Stiftamtmann for Christianssand stiftamt. |
| 1860 | 1871 | Niels Petersen Vogt (1817–1894); Served concurrently as Stiftamtmann for Christianssand stiftamt. |
| 1871 | 1881 | Jakob Krefting Bonnevie (1814–1881); Served concurrently as Stiftamtmann for Christianssand stiftamt. |
| 1882 | 1889 | Johan Christian Georg Hvoslef (1819–1889); Served concurrently as Stiftamtmann for Kristianssand stiftamt. |
| 1889 | 1906 | Hans Georg Jacob Stang (1830–1907); Served concurrently as Stiftamtmann for Kristiansand stiftamt. |
| 1907 | 1918 | Daniel Bremer Juell Koren (1858–1948); Served concurrently as Stiftamtmann for Kristiansand stiftamt (1907-1918). |
County governors of Vest-Agder fylke
| 1919 | 1928 | Daniel Bremer Juell Koren (1858–1948) |
| 1928 | 1948 | Hagbarth Lund (1877–1963) |
| 1942 | 1945 | Iver Leuch Elieson (1889–1968) (WWII Occupied government) |
| 1948 | 1954 | Alf Frydenberg (1896–1989) |
| 1954 | 1966 | Lars Evensen (1896–1969) |
| 1966 | 1982 | Bue Fjermeros (1912–2000) |
| 1982 | 1998 | Oluf Skarpnes (1932–2019) |
| Dec; 1998 | 31 Dec 2015 | Ann-Kristin Olsen (born 1945) |
| 7 Feb 2006 | 28 July 2006 | Lars Erik Lyngdal (born 1945) (Acting for Olsen) |
Office abolished on 1 January 2016, see List of county governors of Agder
