= Paul Ingebretsen =

Norwegian politician (1904–1968)

Paul Ingolf Ingebretsen

Governor of Rogaland
- In office 1959–1968
- Preceded by: John Norem
- Succeeded by: Gunnar Fredrik Hellesen

Personal details
- Born: 15 October 1904 Stavanger, Norway
- Died: 16 August 1968 (aged 63) Norway
- Citizenship: Norway
- Education: Cand.jur.
- Profession: Politician

Paul Ingebretsen (15 October 1904 – 16 August 1968) was a Norwegian politician for the Liberal Party.

Ingebretsen was born in the city of Stavanger. He graduated as cand.jur. in 1927. He worked as Inspector of Taxes in Stavanger from 1947 to 1958.

He was elected to the Norwegian Parliament for the Market towns of Vest-Agder and Rogaland counties constituency in 1950 until 1953. He was later re-elected to represent Rogaland county in 1954 and again in 1958, serving in the parliament until 1961.

Ingebretsen held various positions on the Stavanger city council from 1934 to 1955, except for a period between 1940 and 1945 during the German occupation of Norway. He served as County Governor of Rogaland from 1959 until his death in 1968.

Government offices
Preceded by John Norem	County Governor of Rogaland; 1959–1968	Succeeded by Gunnar Hellesen
