= Povel Juel =

Norwegian civil servant and writer (c.1673–1723)

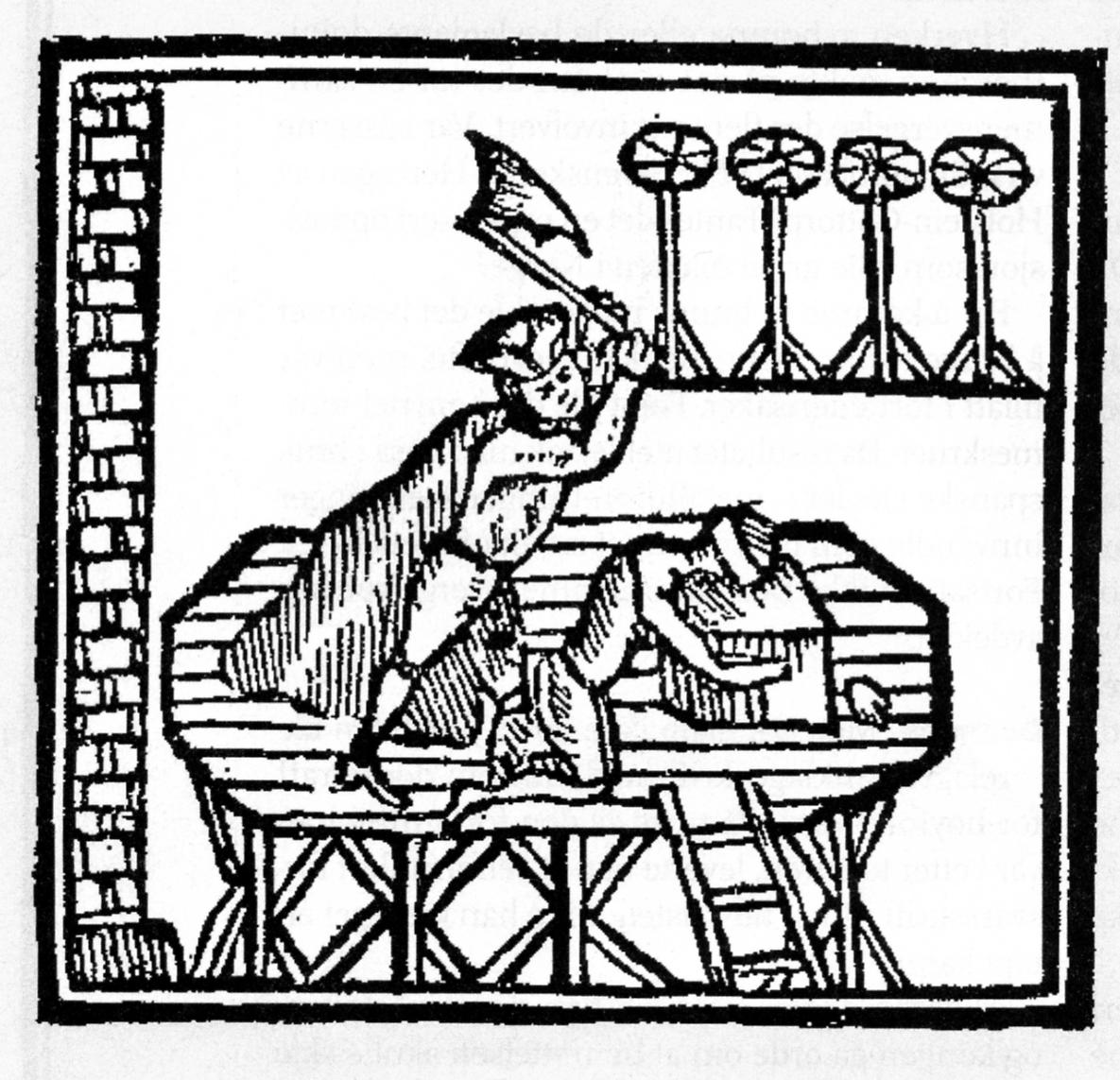
- Povel Juel on the scaffold
- Born: c.1673 Trondheim, Norway
- Died: 8 March 1723 (aged 49–50); Copenhagen, Denmark
- Cause of death: Decapitation
- Occupations: Civil servant and Writer
- Known for: The Povel Juel Plot
- Notable work: Et lycksaligt Liv (1721); En god Bonde, hans Avl og Biæring (1722)

Povel Juel (c.1673 – 8 March 1723) was a Norwegian civil servant and writer, executed for treason in 1723.

== Early life ==
Povel Juel was born and grew up in Trondheim, Norway where his father was a merchant, and a big landowner. At a young age he became the taxman for Bishop Peder Krog, and an assistant to the judge (sorenskriver) in Harstad. But after a fire at the judge`s farm in 1695, where a female servant lost her life, he had to leave Harstad, because of a rumour that he had started the fire to kill the girl since she was pregnant with his child. Juel then moved to Bergen where he worked as a lawyer from 1695 to 1709. In 1709, he was appointed acting commissioner in Bergen.

== As Governor ==
Juel was appointed to be the County Governor of Lister og Mandals amt in 1711. As Governor, he often came into conflict with his superior, the Diocesan Governor of Christianssand stiftamt, Henrik Adeler. One such incident is when Juel had a British ship seized and detained. Adeler ordered him to release the ship, but Juel refused and had the skipper of the ship arrested. Juel was suspended from his job as governor in 1713, but regained his position in 1715. After his reinstatement, he wrote to the King and complained that he hadn't been paid since he began as governor in 1711. He also sent letters with very sharp personal attacks against other government officials. He was fired as governor in 1718 due to unruly and arbitrary behavior. After his firing, he sent several letters to King Frederick IV that asked for another job, but were somewhat threatening.

== Successful Author ==
After he was deposed as governor, he moved to Sweden, and lived there until 1721, and then he moved to Denmark. Juel settled in Copenhagen. Here he became a successful author. Among his books were Et lycksaligt Liv from 1721, and En god Bonde, hans Avl og Biæring from 1722, both books became bestsellers, and was in print 100 years after his death.

== The Conspiracy ==
In 1723, Juel was charged with a role in a conspiracy involving Charles Frederick, Duke of Holstein-Gottorp, (pretender to the throne of Sweden, husband of Grand Duchess Anna Petrovna of Russia and father of Peter III of Russia). The plot involved deposing Frederick IV in favour of Charles Frederick as King of Norway, with military help from Russia, and in return Russia would get the Faroe Islands, Iceland and Greenland. He was executed for high treason at the New Square, Copenhagen in 1723 because of this conspiracy. The plot did not lead to a dissolution of the union between Denmark and Norway at this time, but almost ninety-one years later the union was dissolved after the Treaty of Kiel, in 1814.

Government offices
Preceded by Andreas Undall	County Governor of Lister og Mandals Amt; 1711–1718	Succeeded by Vilhelm Reesen
