= Iver Steen Thomle =

Norwegian jurist

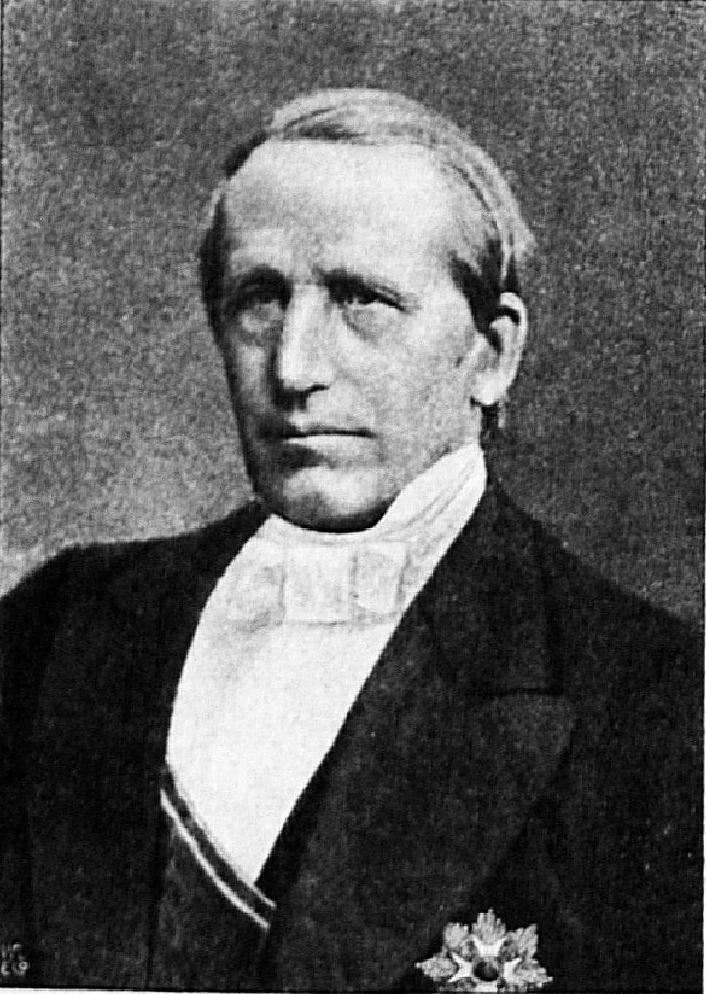
Iver Steen Thomle

Iver Steen Thomle (1 March 1812, in Froland – 16 September 1889, in Kristiania) was a Norwegian jurist.

He was the son of Erich Andreas Thomle and his wife Mette Maria, née Binneballe. His brother was politician and jurist August Thomle. In 1838 Iver Steen Thomle married Augusta Sophie Smith. She died shortly after, but Thomle married Juliane Marie Heyerdahl in 1845.

Thomle graduated from the University of Christiania in 1833. He held jobs in the lawyer's office of Frederik Stang and later the Ministry of Justice. In 1849 he became County Governor of Nedenes (today part of Agder county), a post he held until 1860. He was appointed acting Minister of Justice from September to October 1857.

In 1860 he became a Supreme Court judge. In 1879 he took the dr. juris degree at the University of Copenhagen, and that same year became the seventh Chief Justice of the Supreme Court. He held the position until 1886; as such he was a part of the impeachment trial against the cabinet Selmer in 1883–1884.

Political offices
Preceded by Henrik Harboe	County Governor of Nedenes; 1849–1860	Succeeded by Henrik Laurentius Helliesen
Legal offices
Preceded by Erik Røring Møinichen	Norwegian Minister of Justice and the Police (acting); September 1857–October 1857	Succeeded by Jørgen Herman Vogt
Preceded by Hans Meldahl	Chief Justice of the Supreme Court of Norway; 1878–1886	Succeeded by Morten Lambrechts
