= Magnus Theiste =

Norwegian government official (1725–1791)

Governor of Lister og Mandals amt
- In office 1768–1771

Governor of Nordre Bergenhus amt
- In office 1771–1779

Personal details
- Born: 1725 Christiania, Norway
- Died: 1791 (aged 65–66) Copenhagen, Denmark
- Citizenship: Denmark-Norway
- Parents: Jacob Monsen Theiste (father); Anna Beata Sørensdatter (mother)
- Education: Oslo Cathedral School
- Profession: Government official

Magnus Theiste (1725 – 25 November 1791) was a Norwegian government official. He served as the County Governor of Lister og Mandal county from 1768 to 1771 and of Nordre Bergenhus county from 1771 to 1779.

He was the son of Jacob Monsen Theiste, a timber trader from Christiania and his second wife, Anna Beata Sørensdatter (née Løchstør). He was born in Christiania in 1725. He attended Oslo Cathedral School in 1744 and after graduation, he traveled abroad. From 1761 to 1763, he traveled around Norway, financed by the Dano-Norwegian state, during his journey he wrote a detailed journal about the country. The original journal is today kept at The Royal Library in Copenhagen, Denmark.

In 1768, he was appointed as the County Governor of Lister og Mandals amt. In 1771, he was reassigned and he became the County Governor of Nordre Bergenhus amt.

== As Governor of Nordre Bergenhus ==
During his time in Nordre Bergenhus, he came into some disagreements with Nicolai Frederik Krogh, the roads director for the county. They disagreed over a bridge and in 1773 and it was so bad that royal intervention was required to settle the matter. Some time later, residents of the county sent formal complaints to the King about Theiste as governor. On 29 June 1776, a letter from the King suspended part of his salary, and an appointed commission investigated the complaints and sentenced him to a fine. Soon after, Theiste sent the Diocesan Governor Christian de Schouboe 40 Danish rigsdaler with a request for a favorable declaration in connection with the complaints received. Later, the Supreme Court sentenced him be removed from his office because of trying to pay off de Schouboe. He left office on 23 November 1779. In 1780, however, he received the remainder of his salary for the year plus he was awarded an annual pension of 300 Danish rigsdaler because the sentence was deemed to be somewhat strict in relation to the offense.

He died in Copenhagen on 25 November 1791. Theiste never married.

Government offices
Preceded by Jens Stoud	County Governor of Lister og Mandals amt 1768–1771	Succeeded by Frederik Georg Adeler
Preceded by Joachim de Knagenhielm	County Governor of Nordre Bergenhus amt 1771–1779	Succeeded by Ditlev von Pentz
