= Peder Martin Ottesen =

Norwegian civil servant and politician

Governor of Stavanger Amt
- In office 1826–1828
- Preceded by: Jens Erichstrup
- Succeeded by: Christian Ulrik Kastrup

Personal details
- Born: 17 September 1783 Høyland, Denmark-Norway
- Died: 18 March 1852 (aged 68) Christiania, Sweden-Norway
- Citizenship: Norway
- Education: Cand.jur.
- Profession: civil servant

Peder Martin Ottesen (1783–1852) was a Norwegian civil servant and politician. He served as the County Governor of Stavanger county from 1826 until 1828.

He finished his schooling in 1804 and went on to receive a Cand.jur. degree in 1807. He began his career as a bureau chief in the government commission in Christiania from 1807 to 1810. Ottesen was later the chancellor's secretary from 1811 to 1813, then a judge in Inderøy from 1813 to 1818. He was an assessor at the Akershus diocesan court from 1818 to 1826. Then from 1826 to 1828, he was the governor of Stavanger Amt. In 1828, he became the burgomaster of Christiania, a job he held until 1837. In December 1830, he was the acting governor of Akershus stiftamt after the previous governor left the job and before the next governor began his duties. After being burgomaster, he became the assessor in the Supreme Court starting in 1837.

Ottesen was elected to the Storting from Nordre Trondhjem county from 1818 to 1820, after having been the first deputy representative 1815–1817. Ottesen sat on 17 committees, of which one as chairman and four as secretary. In 1818 he was also deputy secretary of the Lagting. Ottesen was elected auditor general for the Storting in 1824.

He was the son of Provost Otto Ottesen and his wife Christine Realfsdatter Ording. He was the brother of two provosts: Otto Christian Ottesen and Realf Ottesen. Peder Martin Ottesen was married to the merchant's daughter Inger Andrea Riis from Christiania. The assessor Peter Vogt Ottesen is a descendant of theirs.

Government offices
Preceded by Jens Erichstrup	County Governor of Stavanger Amt; 1826–1828	Succeeded by Christian Ulrik Kastrup
