= Carl Lauritz Mechelborg Oppen =

Norwegian jurist and politician

Carl Lauritz Mechelborg Oppen (1830–1914) was a Norwegian jurist and politician.

A jurist by education, he worked as a civil servant in various government ministries. In 1875, he became County Governor of Nordre Bergenhus amt, a post he held until 1889 when he became County Governor of Stavanger amt. He held this position until 1910.

Government offices
Preceded by Nicolai Ræder	County Governor of Nordre Bergenhus amt 1875–1889	Succeeded by Olaj Olsen
Preceded by Vilhelm von Munthe af Morgenstierne	County Governor of Stavanger amt 1889–1910	Succeeded by Thorvald Andreas Larsen
