= Robert Hamilton (Norwegian governor) =

Norwegian governor and military officer

Robert Thomas Hamilton

Governor of Lister og Mandals amt
- In office 1671–1675

Personal details
- Born: Unknown Scotland
- Died: 16 February 1677 Norway
- Citizenship: Denmark-Norway
- Profession: Military officer

Robert Thomas Hamilton (died 1677) was a military officer who served in Denmark and Norway. He served as the first County Governor of Lister og Mandal county from 1671 until around 1675.

Robert Hamilton was born in Scotland. He began as an officer for army for the Kingdom of Denmark-Norway in 1657, serving in the cavalry. This was during a time of an alliance between the House of Stuart who ruled in Britain and the House of Oldenburg who ruled in Denmark-Norway. He was promoted to captain in Norway in 1658 and became a colonel watchmaster in 1660. Hamilton's promotion continued and he made lieutenant colonel in 1661 due to a commendation by King Charles II. He was also named a Knight of the Elephant the same year. In 1668, King Frederik III of Denmark-Norway ordered the Governor-general of Norway to pay 2000 rigsdaler of the army's money to Hamilton in advance of his wages.

In 1670, Hamilton left the cavalry and became commander of Kronborg Castle and was also appointed as the County Governor of Lister og Mandals amt in 1671. These appointments happened after years of service by the Scotsman to the Danish-Norwegian Oldenburg monarchy. He continued as governor until he resigned around 1675 when the Scanian War broke out between the kingdoms of Sweden and Denmark-Norway. At some point Hamilton raised a marine regiment of about 1,000 men for the navy at his own expense. These marines were still in service in the forces of Rigsadmiral Gustaf Otto Stenbock in 1679, although Hamilton himself died before that date. Hamilton is said to have died on 16 February 1677 in Norway and was buried at the King's cost in Copenhagen on 7 May 1677.

Government offices
| New office | County Governor of Lister og Mandals amt 1671–1675 | Succeeded by Jens Toller Rosenheim |
