= Daniel Danielsen Knoff =

Dano-Norwegian civil servant and politician

Governor of Romsdalen Amt
- In office 1680–1681

Governor of Lister og Mandals Amt
- In office 1681–1683

Governor of Stavanger Amt
- In office 1683–1687

Personal details
- Born: 26 September 1614 Roskilde, Denmark
- Died: 6 May 1687 (aged 72) Strømsø, Norway
- Citizenship: Denmark-Norway
- Profession: Politician

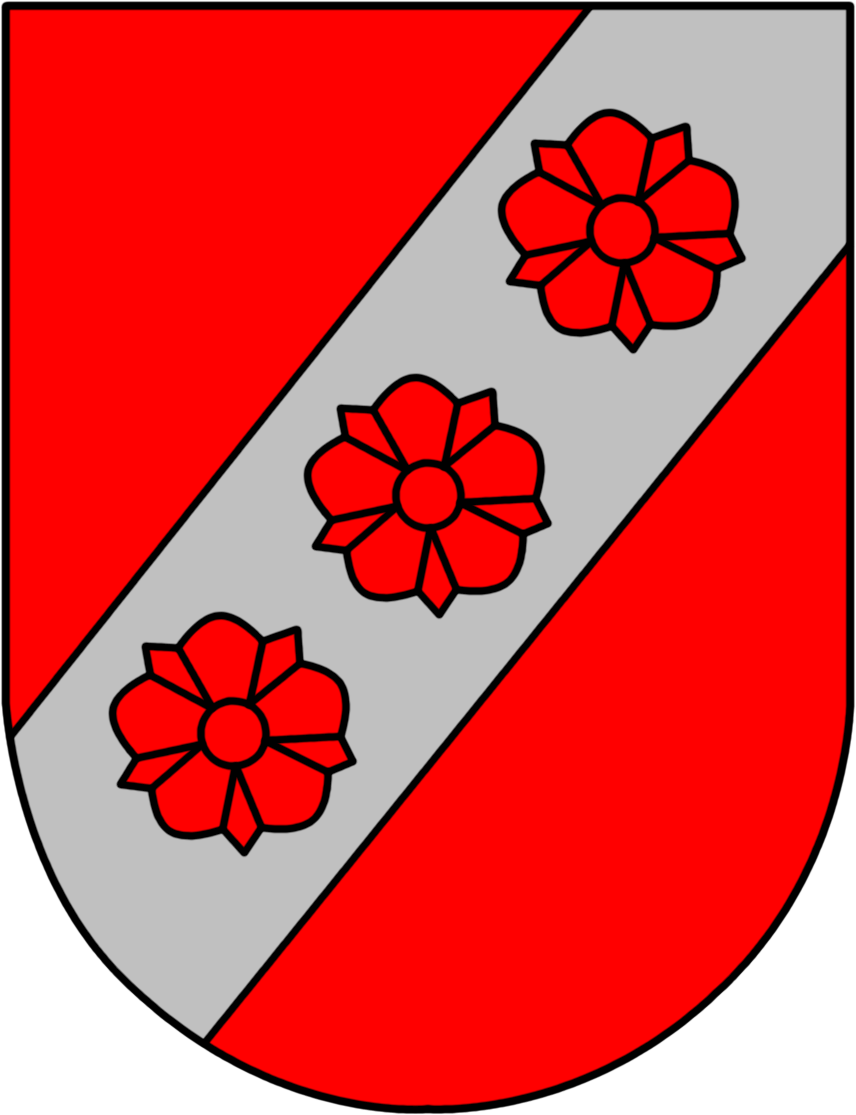
Daniel Danielsen Knoff Coat of Arms

Daniel Danielsen Knoff (1614–1687) was a Dano-Norwegian civil servant and politician. He served as the County Governor of three different counties: Romsdalen county from 1680 until 1681, Lister og Mandal county from 1681 until 1683, and in Stavanger county from 1683 until his death in 1687.

Knoff was born in Roskilde in Denmark. He was a Norwegian businessman and customs administrator. In 1649, he was employed as a customs officer at Bragernes, working as the general customs administrator over the southern part of Norway from 1655 to 1670 and 1673–80. He built a large farm at Strømsø and owned several ironworks and farms in the area. Knoff played an important role in the fight for market town rights for Strømsø and Bragernes (later they merged to form the town of Drammen). He then went on to serve the King as a county governor in three different counties.

Government offices
Preceded by Fredrik von Offenberg	County Governor of Romsdalen Amt; 1680–1681	Succeeded by Jonas Lilienskiold
Preceded by Jens Toller Rosenheim	County Governor of Lister og Mandals Amt; 1681–1683	Succeeded by Ludvig Holgersen Rosenkrantz
Preceded by Ludvig Holgersen Rosenkrantz	County Governor of Stavanger Amt; 1683–1687	Succeeded by Christian Frederik Pogwisch
