= Hans Vilhelm Cederfeld de Simonsen =

Danish landowner and government official

Governor of Christianssand stiftamt
- In office 1810–1812

Diocesan Governor of Fyens stiftamt
- In office 1814–1836

Personal details
- Born: 10 July 1777 Rørup, Funen, Denmark
- Died: 5 May 1836 (aged 58) Odense, Denmark
- Citizenship: Denmark-Norway
- Education: Cand.jur.
- Profession: Politician

Hans Vilhelm Cederfeld de Simonsen (1777–1836) was a Danish landowner and government official. He served as the Diocesan Governor and County Governor of several different counties in Denmark and Norway.

== Early life and education ==
His father was Lorentz Christian Ernst Cederfeld de Simonsen, who in 1776 had married Anne Sophie Simonsen and thereby fulfilled the condition to take possession of the Erholm Manor on the island of Funen. His paternal grandfather was Bartholomæus de Cederfeld. He became a student in 1794 with a Cand.jur. degree.

== Career ==
He took a job in the Rentekammeret, a government agency in 1798. On 20 December 1805, he was appointed to be the County Governor of Lister og Mandals amt in Norway, when he was only 28 years old. In 1810, he was promoted to be the Diocesan Governor of Christianssand stiftamt (and concurrently the County Governor of Nedenæs amt). On 26 November 1811, he was transferred to Denmark where he became the Diocesan Governor of Lolland-Falster (and concurrently the County Governor of Maribo County). On 28 January 1812, he was made a Knight of the Order of the Dannebrog. On 12 April 1814, he was appointed the Diocesan Governor of Fyens stiftamt (and concurrently the County Governor of Odense County). He continued in that role until his death on 5 May 1836.

He was married on 13 August 1814 in Borreby to Elisabeth Castenschiold, daughter of Lieutenant General Joachim Castenschiold in Borreby.

Government offices
| Preceded by Peter Holm | County Governor of Lister og Mandals amt 1805–1810 | Succeeded by Adam Ditlev Wedell-Wedellsborg |
| Preceded by Nicolai Emanuel de Thygeson | Diocesan Governor of Christianssand stiftamt 1810–1812 | Succeeded by Oluf Borch de Schouboe |
| Preceded by Nicolai Emanuel de Thygeson | County Governor of Nedenæs amt 1810–1812 | Succeeded by Oluf Borch de Schouboe |
| Preceded by Caspar Wilhelm von Munthe af Morgenstierne | Diocesan Governor of Lolland-Falster stiftamt 1812–1814 | Succeeded by Mathias Reinhold von Jessen |
| Preceded by Caspar Wilhelm von Munthe af Morgenstierne | County Governor of Maribo amt 1812–1814 | Succeeded by Mathias Reinhold von Jessen |
| Preceded by Gebhard Moltke-Huitfeldt | Diocesan Governor of Fyens stiftamt 1814–1836 | Succeeded by Johan Carl Thuerecht Castenschiold |
| Preceded by Gebhard Moltke-Huitfeldt | County Governor of Odense amt 1814–1836 | Succeeded by Johan Carl Thuerecht Castenschiold |
