= Jens Toller Rosenheim =

Norwegian nobleman, jurist and official (1636–1690)

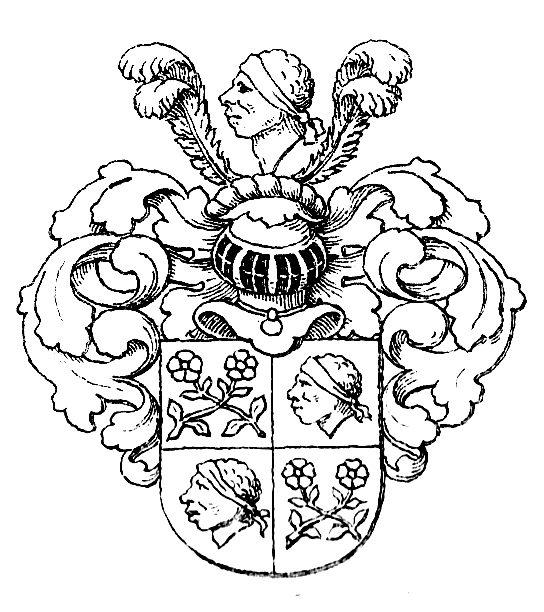
- Rosenheim coat of arms

Governor of Lister og Mandals amt
- In office 1677–1681

Governor of Nedenæs amt
- In office 1680–1681

Personal details
- Born: 1636 Christiania, Norway
- Died: 1690 (aged 53–54) Dublin, Ireland
- Citizenship: Denmark-Norway
- Education: University of Copenhagen (1652); University of Leiden (1658)
- Occupation: Lawyer
- Profession: Norwegian nobleman

Jens Toller Rosenheim (born 1636 in Christiania, died in 1690 in Dublin), was a Norwegian nobleman, jurist and official.

== Family and marriage ==
Jens Toller was the son of Niels Toller (1592-1642), who was Mayor of Christiania (now Oslo) and one of the leading merchants in the city. His father had originally come from Haderslev. Upon his father's death, Jens and his brother Niels inherited a large fortune. Jens Toller attended the University of Copenhagen (1652) and the University of Leiden (1658). He married in 1666 Anne Hansdatter Lilienskiold (d. ca 1680), the daughter of Hans Hansen Lilienskiold (1610-1681) who was the Mayor of Bergen.

== General history ==
Jens Toller became lawyer in 1666. He was in 1676 ennobled under the surname Rosenheim. In 1679, he became the judge of the Supreme Court. In 1676 he became a deputy in the Danish Chancellery. In 1677, he became a county governor in Lister and Mandal county, a post he held until 1681. He also temporarily served as a stewart (acting governor) in the Christianssand stiftamt, a diocesan county in the absence of Ove Juul, the Governor-general of Norway. He also served as the County Governor of Nedenæs county from 1680-1681. Rosenheim was a diplomat to England from 1687-1688. Around 1689, he went to Ireland as the Supreme Commissary of War for the Danish troops. The troops were later given to King Wilhelm III of Orange in order to fight the forces of the expelled king, James II. Rosenheim died during his commission in Ireland.

== Coat of arms ==
Description: A shield of four fields, whereof the upper dexter and the lower sinister on white background have two crossing green rose stilks with red flower, and the others on yellow background have a black human head with a white headband. The same head is the crest.

== See also ==
- Danish nobility
- Norwegian nobility
- Jens Toller Rosenheim article in the Norwegian Wikipedia

Government offices
Preceded by Robert Hamilton	County Governor of Lister og Mandals amt 1677–1681	Succeeded by Daniel Danielsen Knoff
Preceded by Ove Juul	County Governor of Nedenæs amt 1680–1681	Succeeded by Jørgen Müller
