= Jakob Krefting Bonnevie =

Norwegian civil servant and politician

Diocesan Governor of Christianssand stiftamt
- In office 1871–1881
- Preceded by: Niels Petersen Vogt
- Succeeded by: Johan Christian Georg Hvoslef

Personal details
- Born: 15 April 1814 Borre, Norway
- Died: 17 October 1881 (aged 67) Kristiansand, Norway
- Citizenship: Norway
- Education: Cand.jur. (1836)
- Alma mater: Royal Frederick University
- Profession: Politician

Jakob Krefting Bonnevie (1814–1881) was a Norwegian civil servant and politician. He served as the County Governor of Lister og Mandal county from 1871 until his death in 1881.

Bonnevie was born on the large farm Falkensten in Borre in Jarlsberg og Laurvig county. He was a student at the Christiania Cathedral School, graduating in 1831. He then went on to receive his cand.jur. degree at the Royal Frederick University in Christiania in 1836.

Starting in 1837, Bonnevie worked at the Ministry of Education and Church Affairs first as a copyist, later as a clerk and then in 1841 he was named a bureau chief within the ministry. In 1856, he got a position as a councilor in Bergen. Five years later, in 1861, he moved to Kristiansand, where he was Burgomaster for ten years. In 1871, he was named Diocesan Governor for Christianssand stiftamt as well as Lister og Mandals amt (a subordinate county). He held those jobs until he died in 1881.

In 1844 while he worked for the Ministry of Education and Church Affairs, Bonnevie was secretary of the committee that presented the Dissenters Act which later became law. He also ran several times for a seat in the Storting. He ran in 1856 for a seat in Bergen, and ran again in 1858, 1864, and 1867 to represent Kristiansand, but every time he ran, he ended up getting elected to a deputy seats, which meant he would only serve if the elected member had to resign, so he did not serve in any of those Parliaments. However, he was elected to the Storting twice, the first time for the 1871–73 term and again for the 1874–76 term. Both times he was elected as a parliamentary representative for Kristiansand.

He was married to Betty Hermandine Dorothea Lorenzen.

Government offices
| Preceded by Niels Petersen Vogt | Diocesan Governor of Christianssand stiftamt 1871–1881 | Succeeded by Johan Christian Georg Hvoslef |
| Preceded by Niels Petersen Vogt | County Governor of Lister og Mandals amt 1871–1881 | Succeeded by Johan Christian Georg Hvoslef |
