= Konrad B. Knutsen =

Norwegian civil servant (1925–2012)

Konrad Birger Knutsen

Governor of Rogaland
- In office 1973–1981
- Preceded by: Gunnar Fredrik Hellesen
- Succeeded by: Kristin Kverneland Lønningdal

Personal details
- Born: 21 September 1925 Voss Municipality, Norway
- Died: 2 October 2012 (aged 87) Stavanger, Norway
- Education: Cand.jur.
- Profession: Politician

Konrad Birger Knutsen (21 September 1925 – 2 October 2012) was a Norwegian civil servant.

== Biography ==
Knutsen was born on 21 September 1925, in Voss Municipality, and grew up in Bergen and Trondheim. In his education, he earned a candidate degree. He worked at the Norwegian School of Economics and the Ministry of Local Government. He was appointed as chief administrative officer in Hetland Municipality in 1958, as the youngest person in Norway to hold the position. When Hetland was incorporated into Stavanger municipality, Knutsen became chief administrative officer of technics. He then succeeded Andreas Cappelen as chief administrative officer of finance in Stavanger from 1967 to 1973, and County Governor of Rogaland from 1973 to 1981. From January 1975 to November 1981, he served as the State Conciliator of Norway. He was then the chief executive officer of the bank Rogalandsbanken from 1981 to its liquidation in 1987, then a lawyer.

During Knutsen's career in Stavanger and Rogaland, the city was chosen as headquarters for Statoil (now Equinor) and the Norwegian Offshore Directorate, and industry was expanded at Forus. From 2005, he worked for a University of Stavanger. Knutsen was also chair of Elf Aquitaine's Norwegian office, as well as a board member of the Norwegian Missionary Society and the Norwegian Seamen's Mission.

Knutsen was decorated as a Commander of the Order of St. Olav in 1980 and of the Legion of Honour in 1984. He died on 2 October 2012, aged 87, in Stavanger.

Government offices
Preceded by Gunnar Fredrik Hellesen	County Governor of Rogaland; 1973–1981	Succeeded by Kristin Kverneland Lønningdal
Preceded by Preben Munthe	State Conciliator of Norway; 1975–1981	Succeeded by Bjørn Haug
