= Oluf Borch de Schouboe =

Norwegian civil servant and government official

Governor of Stavanger amt
- In office 1810–1812

Diocesan Governor of Christianssand stiftamt
- In office 1812–1836

Personal details
- Born: 5 June 1777 Bergen, Norway
- Died: 21 December 1844 (aged 67) Stockholm, Sweden
- Citizenship: Norway
- Education: University of Copenhagen
- Profession: Politician

Oluf Borch de Schouboe (5 June 1777 – 21 December 1844) was a Norwegian civil servant and government official.

Schouboe was born in Bergen, Norway. As the son of Councillor of State Christian de Schouboe (1737-1789) and Anna Magdalena Müller (1751-1785), he belonged to the Norwegian aristocracy. He is the brother of Ulrik Fredrik Anton de Schouboe.

He completed his legal examination at the University of Copenhagen in 1801. He then served as magistrate at Nykøbing Falster and Elsinore. In 1810, he was appointed Governor of Stavanger Amt, a post held until 1812 when he was promoted and appointed to be the Diocesan Governor of Christianssand Stiftamt. This stiftamt was subdivided into several subordinate counties amt. During this time, he also served as governor of some of these subordinate counties as well. First, he served as the Governor of Nedenes Amt from 1812 to 1815 and then switched roles to be the Governor of Lister og Mandals Amt from 1815 to 1836.

He served as Minister of Education and Church Affairs in 1836, 1839–1840, and 1843–1844; Minister of Auditing in 1838–1839 and 1841–1842; Minister of the Army in 1839 and 1842–1843; and member of the Council of State Division in Stockholm in 1837–1838, 1840–1841, and 1844.

Government offices
| Preceded by Ulrich Wilhelm Koren | County Governor of Stavanger Amt; 1810–1812 | Succeeded by Ulrik Fredrik Anton de Schouboe |
| Preceded by Hans Vilhelm Cederfeld de Simonsen | Diocesan Governor of Christianssand Stiftamt; 1812–1836 | Succeeded by Niels Arntzen Sem |
| Preceded by Hans Vilhelm Cederfeld de Simonsen | County Governor of Nedenes Amt; 1812–1815 | Succeeded by Ulrik Fredrik Anton de Schouboe |
| Preceded by Ulrik Frederik Anton de Schouboe | County Governor of Lister og Mandals Amt; 1815–1836 | Succeeded by Niels Arntzen Sem |
