= Georg Stang =

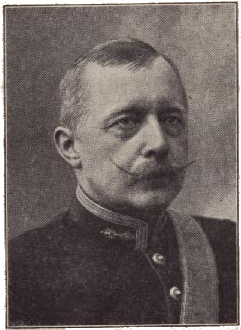

Minister of Defence
- In office 6 November 1900 – 9 June 1903
- Prime Minister: Johannes Steen; Otto Blehr
- Preceded by: Peter T. Holst
- Succeeded by: Thomas Heftye

Personal details
- Born: Hans Georg Jacob Stang; 17 February 1858 Kristiania, Sweden-Norway
- Died: 11 September 1907 (aged 49) Kristiania, Norway
- Party: Liberal
- Spouse: Sigrid Due (m. 1890)
- Parent(s): Jacob Stang (father); Anna Stang (mother)

Hans Georg Jacob Stang (17 February 1858 – 11 September 1907) was a Norwegian military officer and politician from the Liberal Party. He served as the Norwegian Minister of Defence from 1900 to 1903.
