= Ulrik Frederik Anton de Schouboe =

Norwegian civil servant and politician

Governor of Stavanger Amt
- In office 1812–1814
- Preceded by: Oluf Borch de Schouboe
- Succeeded by: Wilhelm Frimann Krog

Governor of Lister og Mandal Amt
- In office 1814–1815
- Preceded by: Adam Ditlev Wedell-Wedellsborg
- Succeeded by: Oluf Borch de Schouboe

Governor of Nedenes Amt
- In office 1815–1837
- Preceded by: Oluf Borch de Schouboe
- Succeeded by: Henrik Harboe

Personal details
- Born: 5 June 1782 Bergen, Denmark-Norway
- Died: 18 December 1863 (aged 81) Christiania, Norway
- Citizenship: Denmark-Norway, Norway
- Education: Cand. jur.
- Profession: Politician

Ulrik Frederik Anton de Schouboe (1782–1863) was a Norwegian civil servant and politician. He served as the County Governor of Stavanger, Lister og Mandal, and Nedenes counties during his career.

Schouboe was the son of the Governor Christian de Schouboe and Anna Magdalene Müller, and he was also the brother of Oluf Borch de Schouboe. He became a student in 1801 and he received his cand. jur. degree in 1804. Starting in 1807, he was employed by the Danske Kancelli. From 1812 to 1814, he was the Governor of Stavanger Amt. From 1814 to 1815, he was the Governor of Lister og Mandals Amt (the first after the dissolution of the union with Denmark) and then from 1815 to 1837, he was the Governor of Nedenes Amt. From 1837 to 1859 he was a State Secretary for the government.

Government offices
Preceded by Oluf Borch de Schouboe	County Governor of Stavanger Amt; 1812–1814	Succeeded by Wilhelm Frimann Krog
Preceded by Adam Ditlev Wedell-Wedellsborg	County Governor of Lister og Mandals Amt; 1814–1815	Succeeded by Oluf Borch de Schouboe
Preceded by Oluf Borch de Schouboe	County Governor of Nedenes Amt; 1815–1837	Succeeded by Henrik Harboe
