= Hans Georg Jacob Stang (prime minister) =

Norwegian attorney, official and politician

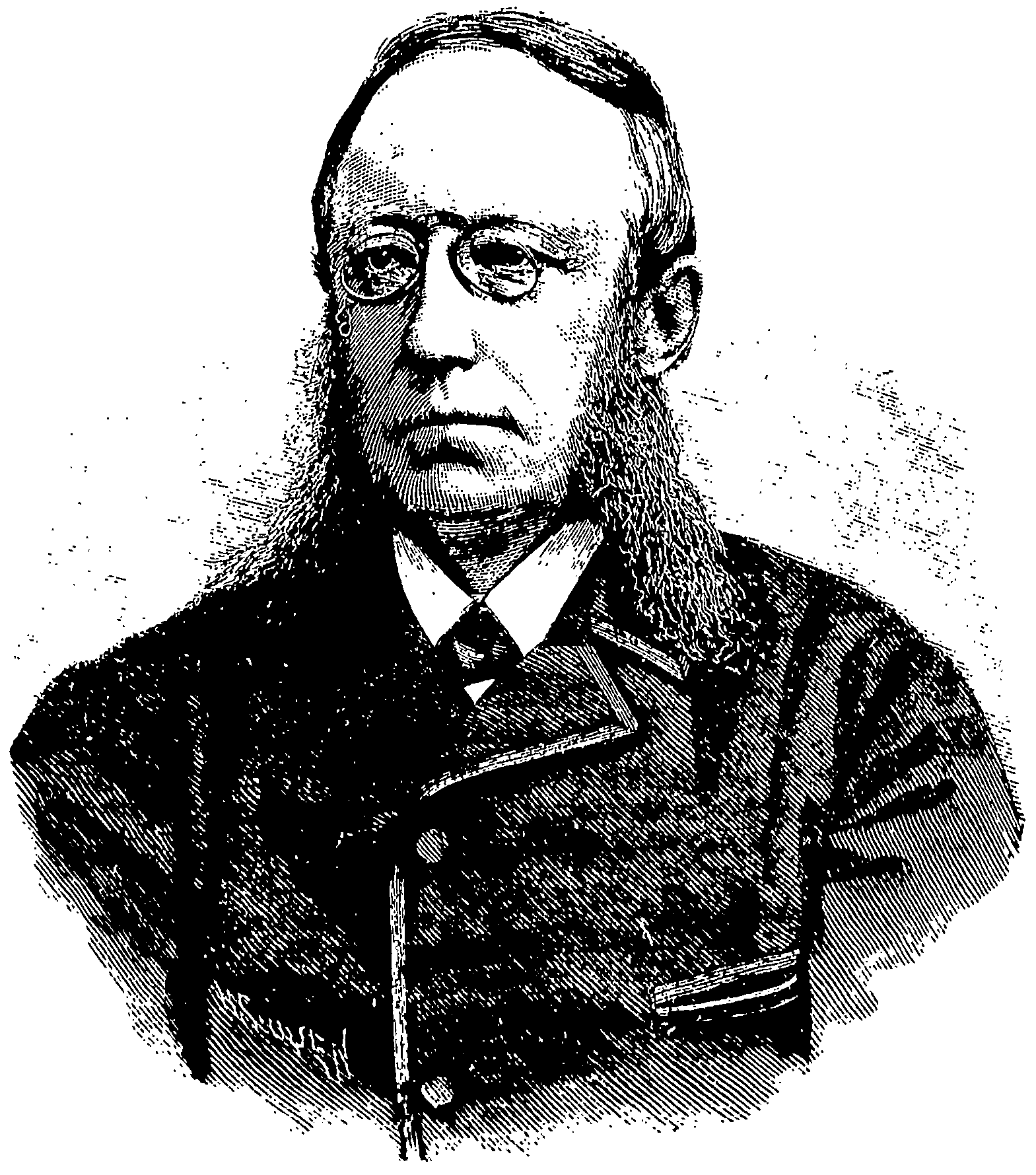

Diocesan Governor of Kristiansand stiftamt
- In office 1889–1906
- Preceded by: Johan Christian Georg Hvoslef
- Succeeded by: Daniel Bremer Juell Koren

Norwegian Prime Minister in Stockholm
- In office 1888–1889
- Monarch: Oscar II
- Preceded by: Ole Richter
- Succeeded by: Gregers Gram

Personal details
- Born: 17 November 1830 Nannestad, Norway
- Died: 1 March 1907 (aged 76) Kristiansand, Norway
- Citizenship: Norway
- Party: Liberal Party
- Spouse: Anna Stang
- Children: Georg Stang
- Education: University of Christiania
- Profession: Politician

Hans Georg Jacob Stang (17 November 1830–1 March 1907) was a Norwegian attorney, official, and politician. He was the Norwegian prime minister in Stockholm (Norges statsminister i Stockholm) from 1888–1889.

== Biography ==
Stang was born in Nannestad, Norway and attended Oslo Cathedral School until 1848, before graduating with a degree in law from the University of Christiania in 1852. He worked for a number of years as a judge in Christiania (now Oslo) before establishing his legal practice in Kongsvinger during 1859. From 1878 to 1884 he was a city judge in Christiania.

He entered into national politics as a member of the administration of Prime Minister Johan Sverdrup in 1884. He was member of the Council of State Division in Stockholm (Norske statsråder i Stockholm) from 1884–1885 and again from 1886–1887. He was the Minister of the Interior from 1885–1886 and Minister of Justice from 1887–1888, as well as head of the Ministry of Justice in 1888. He also served as the County Governor of Lister og Mandals amt and Diocesan Governor of Kristiansand from 1889–1906.

== Personal life ==
He married Anna Sophie Margrethe Holmsen on 28 December 1855. His wife was President of the Norwegian Association for Women's Rights. They were the parents of Georg Stang, who served as Norwegian Minister of Defense (1900–03). He died in Kristiansand on 1 March 1907.

Political offices
Preceded by Sofus Arctander	Minister of the Interior; 1885–1886	Succeeded by Sofus Arctander
Preceded by Birger Kildal	Minister of Justice; 1887–1888	Succeeded by Walter Scott Dahl
Preceded by Ole Richter	Norwegian Prime Minister in Stockholm; 1888–1889	Succeeded by Gregers Gram
Government offices
Preceded by Johan Christian Georg Hvoslef	Diocesan Governor of Kristiansand stiftamt 1889–1906	Succeeded by Daniel Bremer Juell Koren
Preceded by Johan Christian Georg Hvoslef	County Governor of Lister og Mandals amt 1889–1906	Succeeded by Daniel Bremer Juell Koren
