= Friedrich Gotschalk =

Danish businessman and banker (1786–1869)

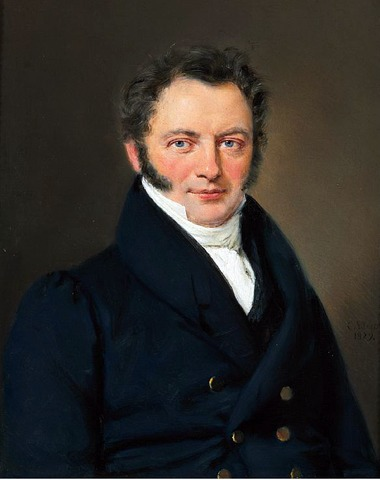
Friedrich Gotschalk (1786–1869)

Friedrich Gotschalk (10 July 1786 – 8 April 1869) was a Danish businessman and banker. He and his brother Edouard Gotschalk owned the trading firm Fr. & E. Gotschalk from 1820 to 1858. It was after his retirement continued by two sons and a nephew, and later, by other owners, until at least the 1950s. Gotschalk owned the property Amaliegade 16 in Copenhagen.

== Early life ==
Gotschalk was born on 10 July 1786 in Gevelsberg, Arnsberg, North Rhine-Westphalia. His parents were Peter Daniel Gotschalk and Christina Dorothea Gotschalk. His grandson Frederik Gotschalk mentions in his memoirs (Ungdomserindringer, 1917) that his grandfather fled to Altona to escape military service in Napoleon's army. He would later continue to Copenhagen where he settled on a permanent basis.

== Career ==
Gotschalk established his own trading firm in 1809. In 1820, he partnered with his brother Eduard Gotschalk (1781–1858).

== Personal life and legacy ==
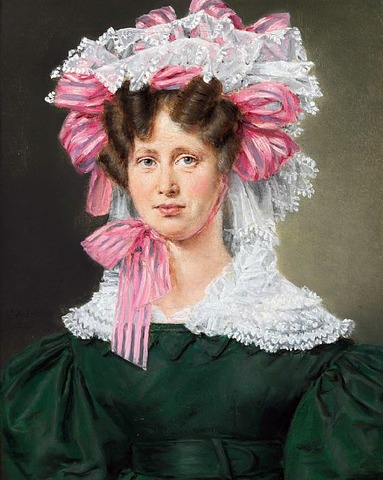
Marie Frederikke Kierulff

Gotschalk was married to Marie Frederikke Kierulff (1681–1870), daughter of Søren Severin Kierulf (1752–1834) and Friderica Amalia Humble (1770–1811). They had three sons and six daughters. Gotschalk's brother Edouard was married to her sister Cathinka Hampton Kjerulff (1806–1835).

Friedrich Gotschalk owned the property at Amaliegade 16 in Copenhagen. It was later owned by one of his sons.

From his retirement in 1858, Gotschalk's firm was continued by his sons John Kjærulf Gotschalk (1820–1889) and Peter Frederik Gotschalk (1816–1874). In 1860, Victor Hugo Gotschalk, their cousin, was also made a partner in the firm. John Kjærulf Gotschalk was the sole owner of the firm from 1874. In 1887, he partnered with John Hornemann (1858–1915). Hornemann was the sole owner of the firm from 1889 until his death. From 1 February 1916, the firm was continued by banker Paul Hagemann (1882-). The firm was later headquartered at Sankt Annæ Plads 8 (1910) and Rådhusstræde 7 (1950).

John Kjærulf Gotschalk (1820–1889) was married twice, first to Bertha Scharff (died 1850) and then Johanne Rosing (1827–90). Peter Frederik Gotschalk (1816–1874) was married to Christine Marie Emilie Casadaban (1833–), daughter of royal cook Alphonse Casadaban and Johanne Caroline (Casabadan (méeLund).

Gotschalk's third son William Edvard Gotschalk (1823–1862) was a medical doctor. He worked for Almindeligt Hospital in 1847–50 and as a ship's physician in Skibslæge 48–49. In 1850, he settled in Chile where he became city physician in Copiapó. On 4 June 1862, he was appointed Danish consul to Chile.

Gotschalk's eldest daughter Ida Frederikke was later married to the businessman and politician Christian August Broberg. The daughter Lucinde married Peter Christian Knudtzon (who owned the adjacent property Amaliegade 14 from 1858). The daughter Harriet Julie married the naval physician Christian Wilken Hornemann. The daughter Louise Augusta married Sigvard August Blom, a son of master builder Thomas Blom. The daughter Emmy married the businessman Alfred Hansen, owner of A. M. Hansen & Co. and Øregaard.

In his memoirs, Ungdonserindringer, published as part of the series Memoirer of Breve (1816), Gotschalk's grandson Frederik Gotschalk Knudtzon provides a description of Gotschalk, his home and other members of the family. Gotschalk and his home is also mentioned in the businessman Luis Bramsen's memoirs. Gotschalk's son Kjerulf and Bramsen were classmates at St. Petris Realskole from around 1825.
