= Amaliegade 16 =

Historic building in Denmark

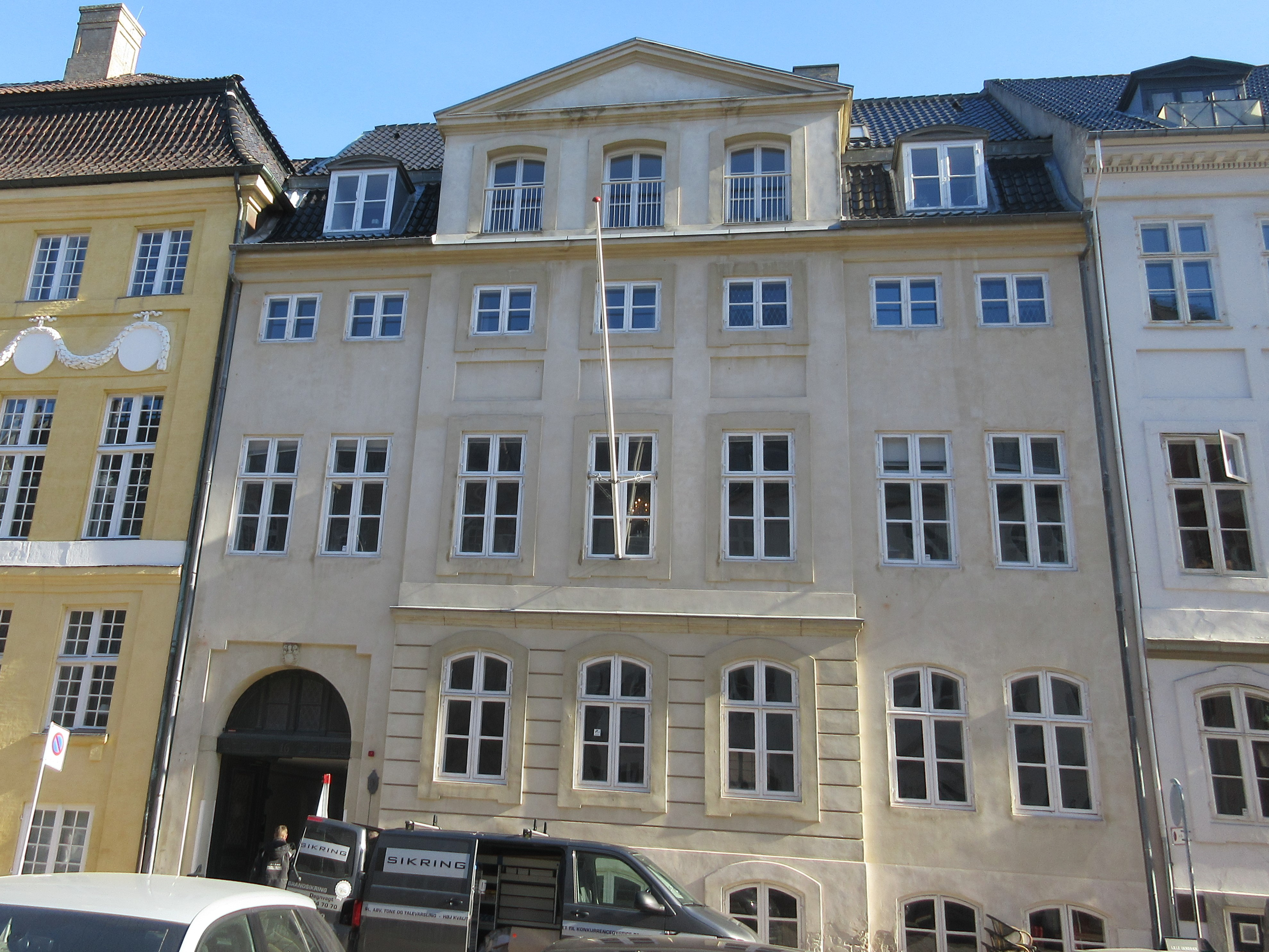
- Interactive map of the Amaliegade 16 area

General information
- Location: Copenhagen, Denmark
- Coordinates: 55°40′58.23″N 12°35′33.39″E
- Completed: 1756

Design and construction
- Architect: Nicolai Eigtved

Amaliegade 16 is a historic building located next to the Yellow Mansion in the heart of the Frederiksstaden district of central Copenhagen, Denmark. The building dates from the 1750s but was altered in the second half of the 18th century. It was listed on the Danish registry of protected buildings and places in 1918.

== History ==
=== 18th century ===
Amaliegade 16 was one of several houses in the street that was designed by Nicolai Eigtved who a few years prior had also created the masterplan for the new Frederiksstaden district. It was built after his death by his successor Lauritz de Thurah in 1756-1757 for master carpenter Johan Andreas Pfüntzer (ca.1708-ca.1764).

Johan Andrea Pfitzner's property was listed in the new cadastre of 1756 as No. 71 K1 in St. Ann's East Quarter. On Christian Gedde's map of St. Ann's East Quarter, it is marked as No. 317.

=== 1800–c. 1820 ===
The statesman Frederik Julius Kaas lived in the building from 1802. The Kaas family's coat of arms is seen on the jeystone above the gate. In the same year, on 23 May, 1671, Parsberg was raised to Count. Jaas had just returned to Copenhagen after spending 20 years in Norway, then part of Denmark-Norway, most recently as deocesan governor of Akershus. He had just been appointed to president of the Supreme Court. In 1804, he was appointed as president of Danske Kancelli.

The property was listed in the new cadastre of 1806 as No. 122 in St. Ann's East Quarter. It belonged to a member of the Drewsen family at that time.

Licensed as a grosserer and with title of regimentsskriver F. C. Bülow (1769-1844), a military officer, resided in one of the apartments from 1805 to 1810.

=== Friedrich Gotschalk ===
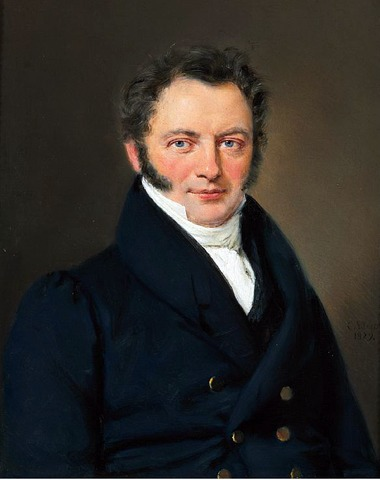
Friedrich Gotschalk

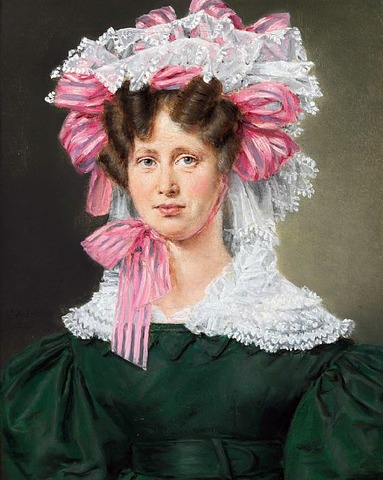
Marie Frederikke Gotschalk, née Kierulff

The property was later acquired by merchant and banker Friedrich Gotschalk.

Gotschalk's property was home to 21 residents in four households at the 1834 census. Friedrich Gotschalk resided on the first floor with his wife Marie Friedr.Kierulf, their nine children (aged five to 21), one male servant and four maids. Otto Grev Af Baudissin. a captain in the King's Lige Guard On Foot, resided on the ground floor with his wife Andreas Madsen. Christine Sal.Lundsteen, a concierge and laundry lady, resided in the basement 2with her 19-year-old daughter Johanne Wilhelmine Lundsteen. Johann Adolph Saran, a warehouse manager, resided in the rear wing.

Gotschalk's building was home to 15 residents at the 1845 census. Gotschalk resided there with his wife Maria Frederikke Gotschalkm their six children (aged 17 to 29), one male servant and three maids. Mette Abitz, a concierge, resided in the building with his wife Marie Sophie Frederikke and their son Peter Lorenz Christian Abitz.

Their daughter Ida Frederikke was later married to the businessman and politician Christian August Broberg. The daughter Lucinde married Peter Christian Knudtzon. The daughter Harriet Julie married the naval physician Christian Wilken Hornemann. The daughter Louise Augusta married Sigvard August Blom, a son of master building Thomas Blom. The daughter Emmy married the businessman Alfred Hansen, owner of A. M. Hansen & Co. and Øregaard.

Frederik Gotschalk Knudtzon, Gotschalk's grandson, had described the Gotscalk' family's life in the building in his Ungdomserindringer.

== Architecture ==
Amaliegade 16 consists of three storeys over a high cellar. The building is seven bays wide and has a three-bay median risalit. The median risalit was originally tipped by a triangular pediment but it was removed in 1867 and replaced by the current three-bay wall dormer in 1895. The median risalit is divided horizontally by a cornice between the first and second floor. It originally ran along the full width of the building. The keystone above the gate features a carved coat of arms.

The roof is a Mansard roof with black tile towards the street while it is clad with winged red tile towards the courtyard. The central three-bay wall dormer is flanked by two smaller dormer windows.

A four-storey, six-bay side wing extends from the rear side of the building.

== Today ==
Amaliegade 16 was acquired by Jeudan in 2019 and contains a combination of residential apartments and office space. Tenants include the law firms Cumberland Advokater and Invictus Advokater and the cosmetics company Tromborg.
