= Severin Kierulf =

Danish businessman in India

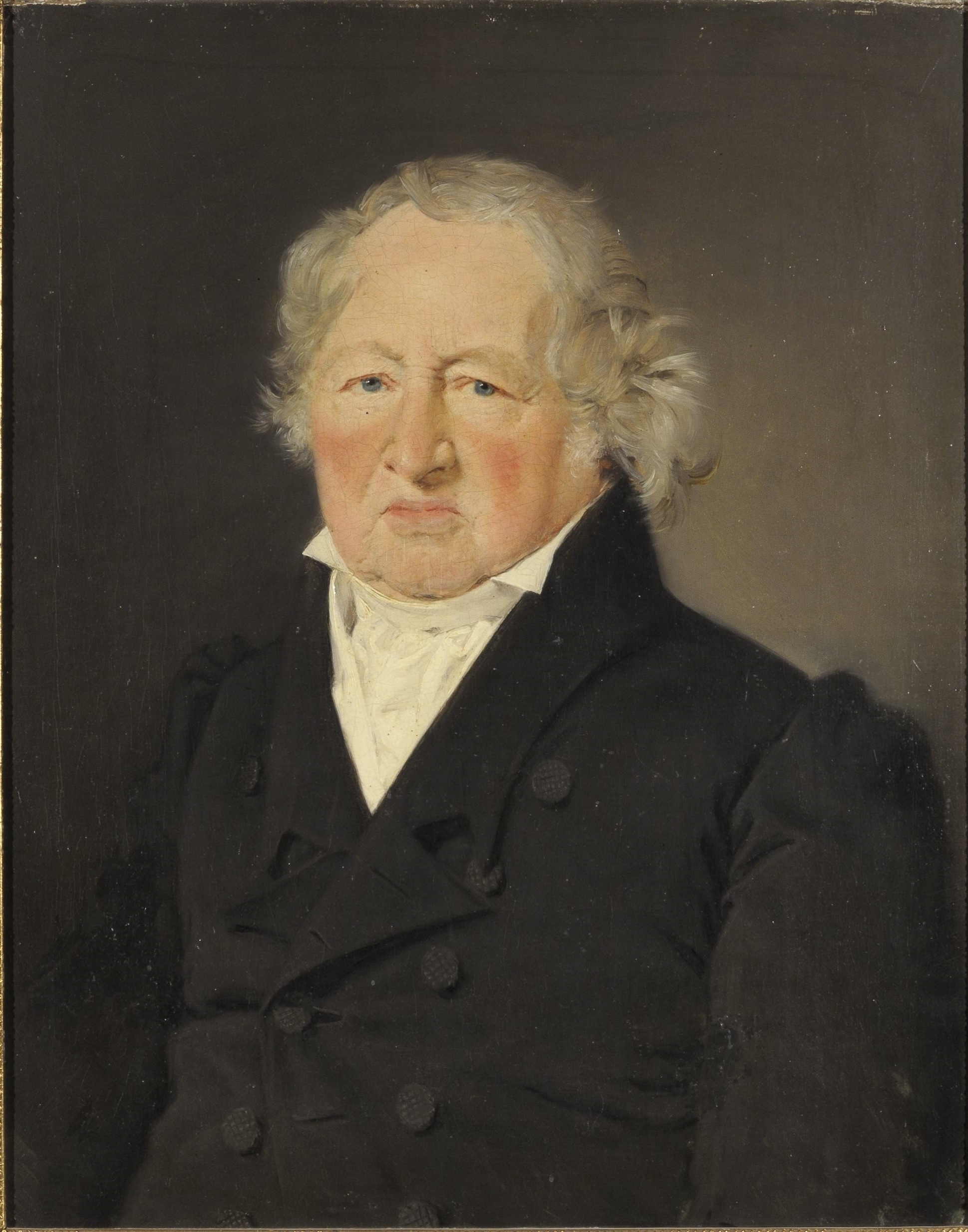
Severin Kierulf painted by Christian Albrecht Jensen.

Severin Kierulf (17 December 1752 – 7–8 October 1834) was a Danish businessman in India. He was a partner in the firm Duntzfeldt & Kierulf and served as factor for the Danish Asiatic Company in Frederiksnagore (Serampore). He was the father-in-law of businessman Friedrich Gotschalk.

== Early life and education ==
Kierulf was born on 17 December 1752 in Svindinge on Funen, the son of Poul Sørensen Kjerulf (1717–1781) and Karen Friis Hansdatter Fabricius.

== Career ==
In 1776, he served as Bottelér on board the Danish Asiatic Company's ship Ganges. In Frederiksnagore he was employed as Assistant for the company. From 1788 to 1799, he was in Tranquebar. In 1799, he moved back to Serampore after HAVING BEEN appointed as factor. In 1812, he was promoted to 1st Factor. He was also involved in private trade as partner in the firm Duntzfelt, Blom & Kierulf. His business partner William Duntzfelt moved to Copenhagen in 1788.

== Personal life ==
In 1790, while he lived in Tranquebar, Kierulf was married to Frederikke Humble (1770–1711). In 1822, he moved back to Denmark. He made the voyage on board the frigate Nymphen, captained by his son Poul Severin Kierulf. He lived with his daughter and son-in-law in Copenhagen. He died on 7–8 October 1834.

Kierulf was survived by five of his children. Marie Frederikke (1791–1870) was married to the businessman Friedrich Gotschalk. They lived at Amaliegade 16 in Copenhagen. Poul (Paul)Severin Kierulf (1793–1841) was an officer in the Royal Danish Navy, general trader and ship-owner. He was married to Johanne Marie Mørch (1796-1867). The couple had no children. Christian Pingel Kierulf (1800–1849) was a medical doctor. He was married to Catrine Nielsen. William Duntzfeld Kierulf (1800–1841) settled as a merchant in Manila. He owned the company Kierulf & Co. In 1839, he was appointed as Danish consul-general in the city. Cathinka Hampton Kierulf (1806–1835) was married to Eduard Gotschalk (1791-1858), brother and business partner of the above-mentioned Friedrich Gotschalk.

A series of Kierulf's notebooks from the years 1808–1822, as well as a number of other artifacts associated with Kierulf, are in the collection of the Danish Maritime Museum. A portrait of Kierulf by Christian Albrecht Jensen was presented to the museum in 1979.
