= Carl Rafn =

Carl Rafn may refer to:

- Carl Christian Rafn (1795–1864), Danish historian, translator, and antiquarian
- Carl Gottlob Rafn (1769–1808), Danish scientist and civil servant
