= Rådhusstræde 7 =

Listed building in Copenhagen

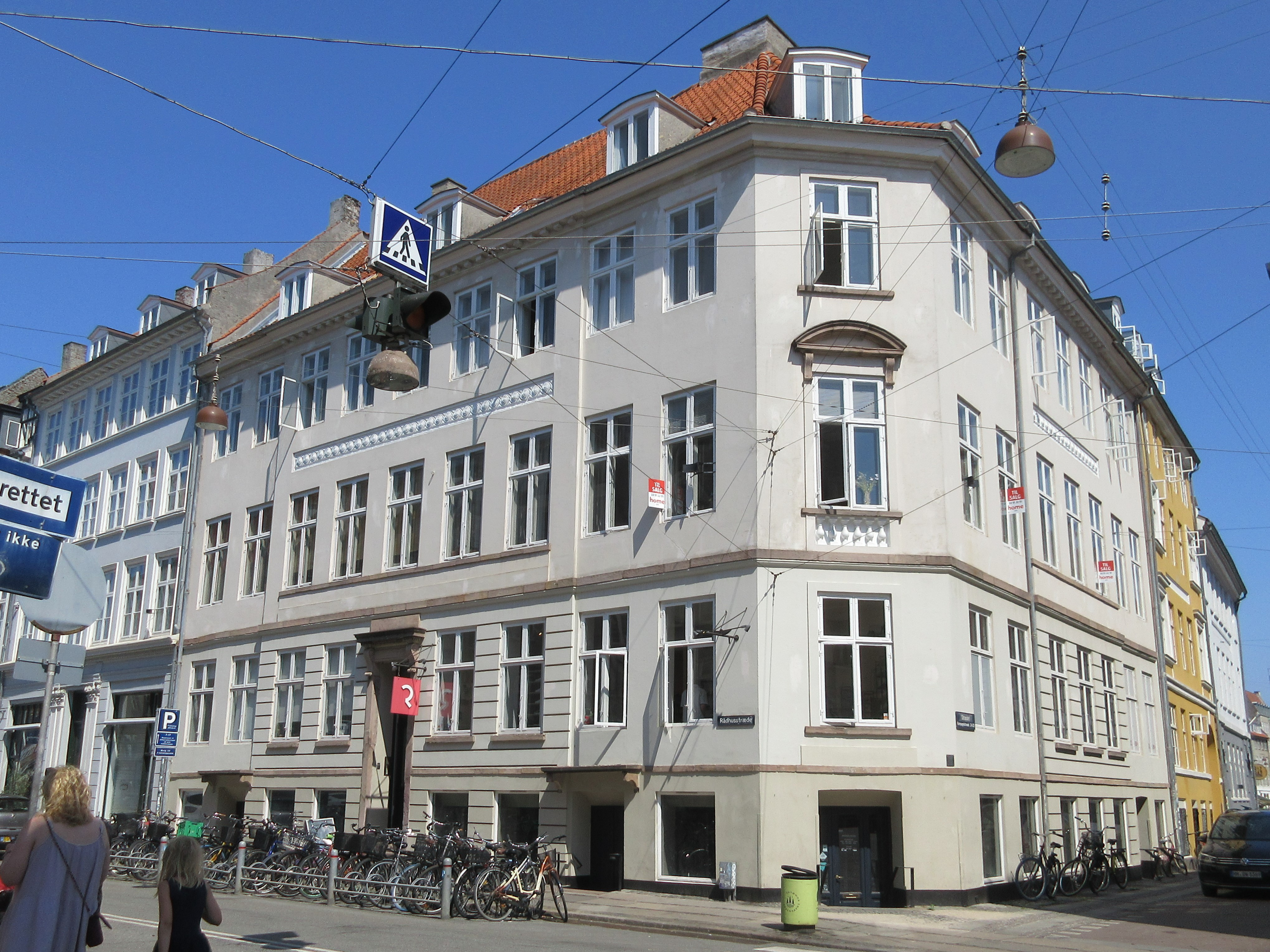
- Interactive map of the Rådhusstræde 7 area

General information
- Architectural style: Neoclassical
- Location: Copenhagen, Denmark
- Coordinates: 55°40′36.55″N 12°34′27.84″E
- Completed: 1797–

Design and construction
- Architect: Johan Peter Boye Junge

Rådhusstræde 7 is a Neoclassical building situated at the corner of Rådhusstræde and Kompagnistræde in the Old Town of Copenhagen, Denmark. The building was like most of the other buildings in the street constructed as part of the rebuilding of the city following the Copenhagen Fire of 1795. It was listed in the Danish registry of protected buildings and places in 1918. The scope of the heritage listing was expanded in 1979. Notable former residents include the civil servant and naturalist Carl Gottlob Rafn and professor of philosophy Frederik Christian Sibbern.

== History ==
=== 18th century ===
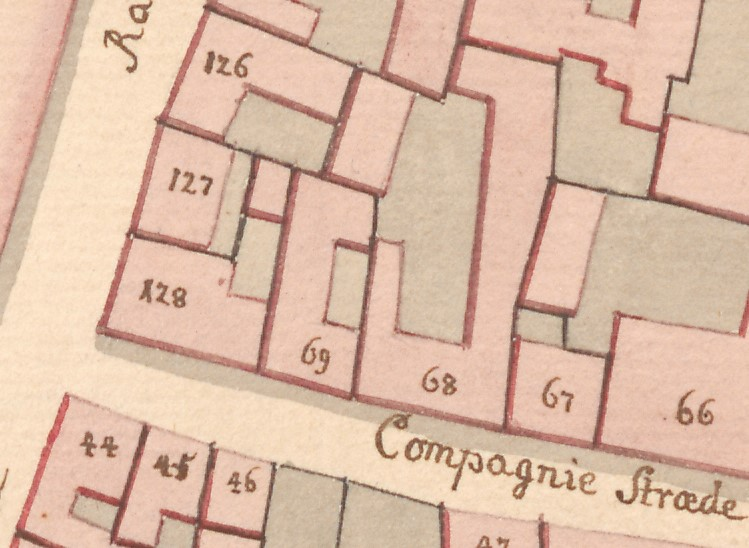
No. 127 and No. 128 seen on a detail from Christian Gedde's map of Snaren's Quarter, 1756.

The site was formerly made up of three smaller properties. The corner property was listed in Copenhagen's first cadastre of 1689 as No. 71 in Snaren's Quarter, owned by merchant Christian Meyer. The adjacent property in Rådhusstræde was listed as No. 144, owned by tailor Frederik Knøtel. The next property in Rådhusstræde was listed as No. 145, owned by hatter Claus Scharmer. No. 144 and No. 145 were later merged into a single property. It was listed in the new cadastre of 1756 as No. 127 in Snaren's Quarter and belonged to hatter Niels Eegholm at that time. The old No. 71 was listed as No. 128 and belonged to baker Hans Reimer.

No. 127 was home to 12 residents in three households at the time of the 1787 census. Anna Cathrina Zøllner, a widow, resided in the building with her niece Charlotte Chatrine Lund, her nephew Jacob Mathias Sencius Lund and one maid. Sara Cathrina Schmidt, another widow (of an etatsråd), resided in the building with one maid and the lodger Niels Ahrentzen. Hans Petersen, a horseman (forrider) for the crown prince, resided in the building with his wife Christina Fischer, their three children (aged four to nine) and one maid. No. 128 was home to 21 residents in five households at the 1787 census. Christian Friderich Dermann, widow of a wigmaker, resided in the building with one maid. Lovise Knudsen, another widow, was also residing in the building with one maid. Friderich Henningsen, a renteskriver with title of justitsråd, resided in the building with his wife Maria Dorethea Henningsen, his nephew Carl Friderich Henningsen (also a renteskriver), and one maid. Maria Elisabeth Dircks, a widow dealing in West Indian products, resided in the building with her three children (aged nine to 15) and two maids. Anthon Christensen, a coachman (materialkysk), resided in the building with his wife Anne Maria Jørgens Datter, their three-year-old son and four lodgers.

The two properties were both destroyed in the Copenhagen Fire of 1795, together with most of the other buildings in the area. The two fire sites were subsequently merged into a single property. The present building on the site was constructed in 1797–1798 for widow Marie Elisabeth Dircks. It is not clear weather she was already the owner of the property at the time of the 1787 census. Her late husband was Boye Boyesen? Diriks (1744–1780), a ship captain sailing in the Danish West Indies.

=== Cantor family ===
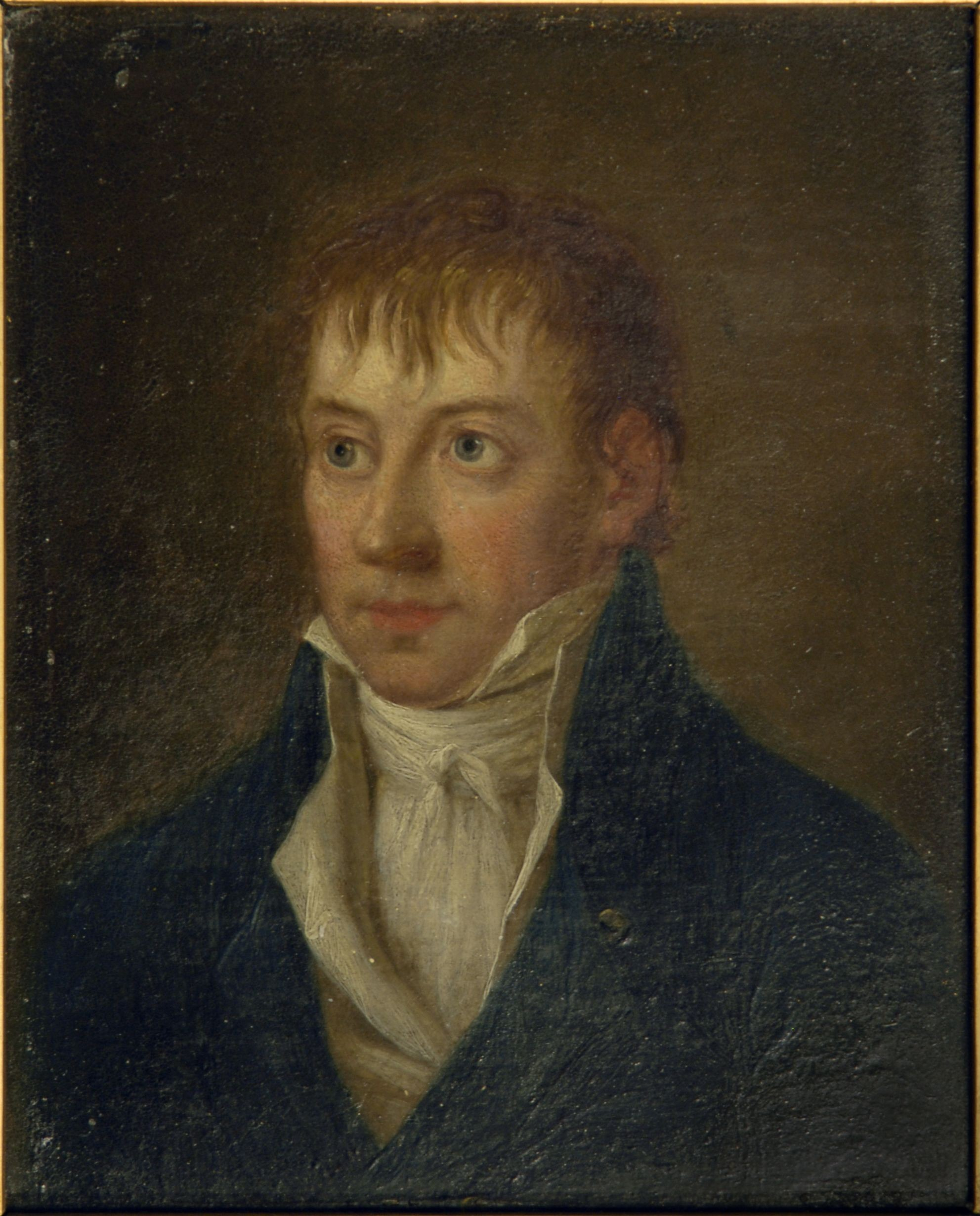
Carl Gottlob Rafn, painted by Hansen

Dircks died before her new building was completed. It was subsequently sold to the Jewish businessman (grosserer) Heiman Isaac Cantor. His property was home to 31 residents in seven households at the 1801 census. Heiman Isaac Cantor resided in the building with his wife Sara Wulff, his bookkeeper Bram Helft and one maid. Carl Gottlob Rafn, a civil servant and natural historian, resided in the building with his wife Anne Catharine Lorenzen, their one-year-old son Peter Christian Rafn, one and three maids. Margrethe Klow, a widow, resided in the building with her 40-year-old son Hendrich Høyer and two maids. Hanne Seierød, another widow, resided in the building with her 29-year-old daughter Catharine Seierød and one maid. Peter Meyer, a junk dealer, resided in the basement with his wife Birthe Marie Smidt, their 20-year-old son Johannes Meyer and a six-year-old grandson. Niels Christophersen, a beer seller (øltapper), resided in the basement with his wife Christine Holm and their two children (aged four and six). Berg Theraldsen Sundbye, another beer seller (øltapper), resided in the basement with his wife Lovise Jensdatter and their three children (aged two to five).

The property was listed in the new cadastre of 1806 as No. 43 in Snaren's Quarter. It was still owned by Heiman Cantor at that time. Frederik Christian Sibbern, a professor of philosophy at the University of Copenhagen, was a resident of the building in 1816.

=== 1840 census ===
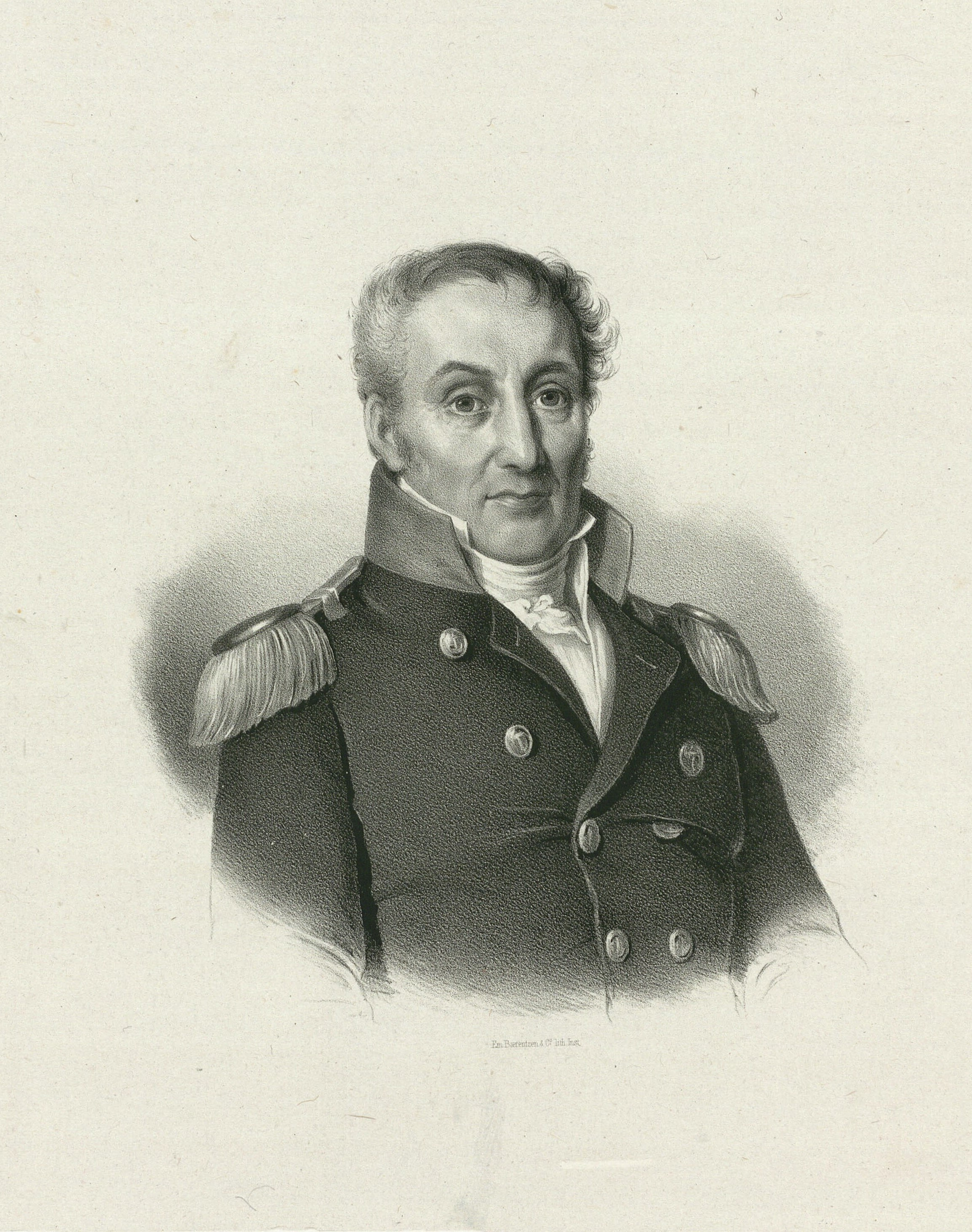
Jonas Rist

The property was home to 48 residents in seven households at the 1840 census. Christian Wilhelm Behrend, a broker, resided on the ground floor with his wife Christine (née Meier), their six children (aged 10 to 23) and one maid. Simon Georg Klein, a royal clerk, resided on the same floor with his wife Petrea Augusta (née Steffensen), their three children (aged three and seven) and two maids. Jonas Rist (1767–1845), a commander captain, resided on the first floor with his wife Inger (née Hyssing), two sons (aged 31 and 33) and three maids. Johan Hendrik Falkenthal (ca. 1790–1850), a secretary, resided on the same floor with his wife Nielsine (née Kurtzhals, 1808–1888, a sister of architect Niels Schønberg Kurtzhals and Bertel Thorvaldsen's former girlfriend Sophie Amalie Kurtzhals), their three children (aged four to ten) and one maid. Karen Marie Gyldenpalm, widow of provost Hans Hagerup Gyldenpalm (1774–1827), resided on the second floor with her sister Ghrete Bolette Mariager and one maid. Lovise Charlotte Andersen, a master painter, resided on the same floor with his wife Lovise Magrethe (née Weyle), their two sons (aged one and two), two painter's apprentices and two maids. Hans Jensen Thoustrup, a barkeeper, resided in the basement with his wife Bergitte Thoustrup, their two daughters (aged 15 and 19), his 20-year-old nephew Peter Eriksen and one maid. Karen Koller, a widow cake baker (kukkenbager), resided in the basement with her sister Peter Koller.

=== 1860 census ===
The property was home to 40 residents in seven households at the 1860 census. Ane Dorthea Fonnesbech (1802–1891), widow of Anders Christensen Fonnesbech (1777–1842), resided on the first floor to the right with her daughter Marie Catrine Fonnesbech, a husjomfru and a maid. Emil Ludvig Edvard Which, a district physician, resided on the first floor to the left with his wife Magnasine Wick (née Buch), their two daughters (aged eight to 11), his sister Caroline Mathea Wick and one maid. Andreas Prinneau, a retired captain, resided on the second floor to the right with his wife Christiane Prinneau, one maid and one lodger. Nicoline Koefoed, widow of a justitsråd, resided on the second floor to the right with 41-year-old Nine Bruun and one maid. Ole Christen Listrup, a pastry baker, resided on the ground floor to the left and in the basement to the left with his wife Signe Frederich Listrup (née Thorkildsen), their five children (aged one to 13), two pastry bakers (employees), two apprentices, a caretaker, two waitresses and two maids. Johan Adolph Klein, an infantry lieutenant, resided on the ground floor to the right with his wife Anna Catharine Maren (née Berg), their two-year-old daughter, a clerk, a husjomfru and a maid. Morten Nielsen, a barkeeper, resided in the basement to the right with his wife Ane Regine Hendriksen.

=== 20th century ===
The property was home to four households at the 1906 census. Wilhelm August Sophus Weincke (1852–1914), a businessman (grosserer), resided on the second floor with his wife Emilie Weincke, his two children and two maids. Ida Tegner, a married woman, resided on the first floor with her two children (aged 19 and 24) and one maid. Margrethe Storck, a nurse, resided in the garret with the widow Bertha Christiansen and one maid. Lars Andersen, a barkeeper, resided in the basement with his wife Henrikke Dorthea Andersen. their daughter Anna Caroline Andersen and their daughter-in-law Ellen Kirstine Anholm.

Wilhelm August Sophus Weincke had established a tobacco wholesale company in 1874. It was based at Ny Vestergade 9 in 1910.

Fr. & E Gotschalk, a firm established by Edouard and Friedrich Gotschalk as far back as 1820, was based in the building in 1950.

== Architecture ==
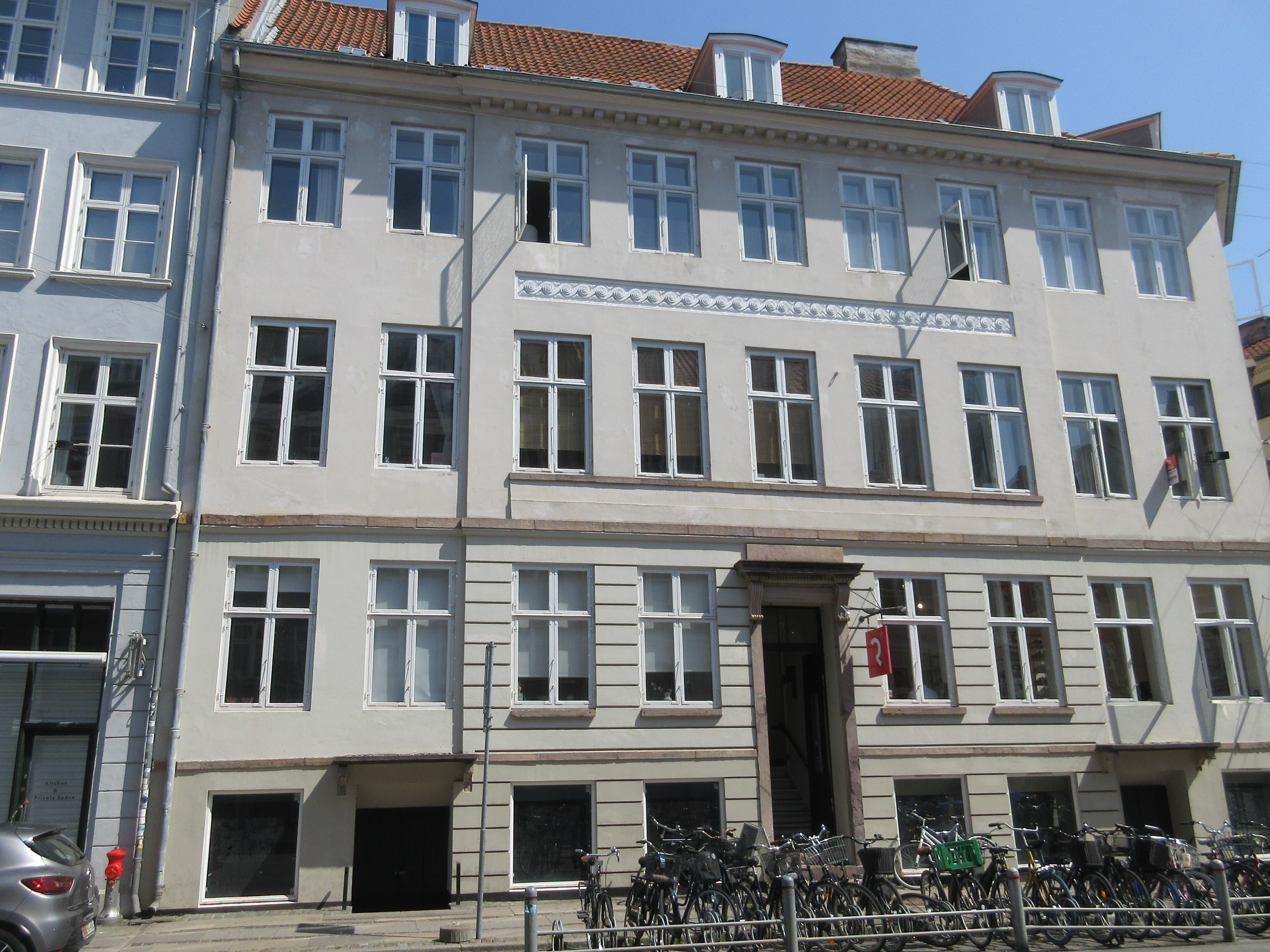
The facade towards Rådhusstræde.

Rådhusstræde 7 is a corner building constructed with three storeys above a walk-out basement. It has a nine-bay-long facade towards Rådhusstræde, a seven-bays-long facade towards Kompagnistræde and a chamfered corner. The plastered facade features a wide sandstone band above the ground floor and a more narrow one above the exposed part of the basement. The five central bays in Rådhusstræde and the three central ones in Kompagnistræde form slightly projecting median risalits, both of which are accented with shadow joints on the ground floor and the exposed part of the ground floor. The cornice is also dentillated on the median risalit, while its lateral parts is without dentillation. A frieze with wave schroll ornamentation is seen between the windows of the second and third floor. The first-floor corner windows is also accented, both with a blind balustrade below it a projecting sandstone sill and a hood mould supported by corbels. The central main entrance in Rådhusstræde and the two basement entrances in the second and seventh bays are also topped by hood moulds. A three-bay-long side wing extends from the rear side of the Rådhusstræde wing along the north side of a central courtyard.

== Today ==
The property is owned by E/F Rådhusstræde 7. It contains retail space on the ground floor and in the basement and two condominiums on each of the upper floors.
