= Amaliegade 14 =

Historic building in Copenhagen, Denmark

Coordinates: 55.6827°N 12.5924°E

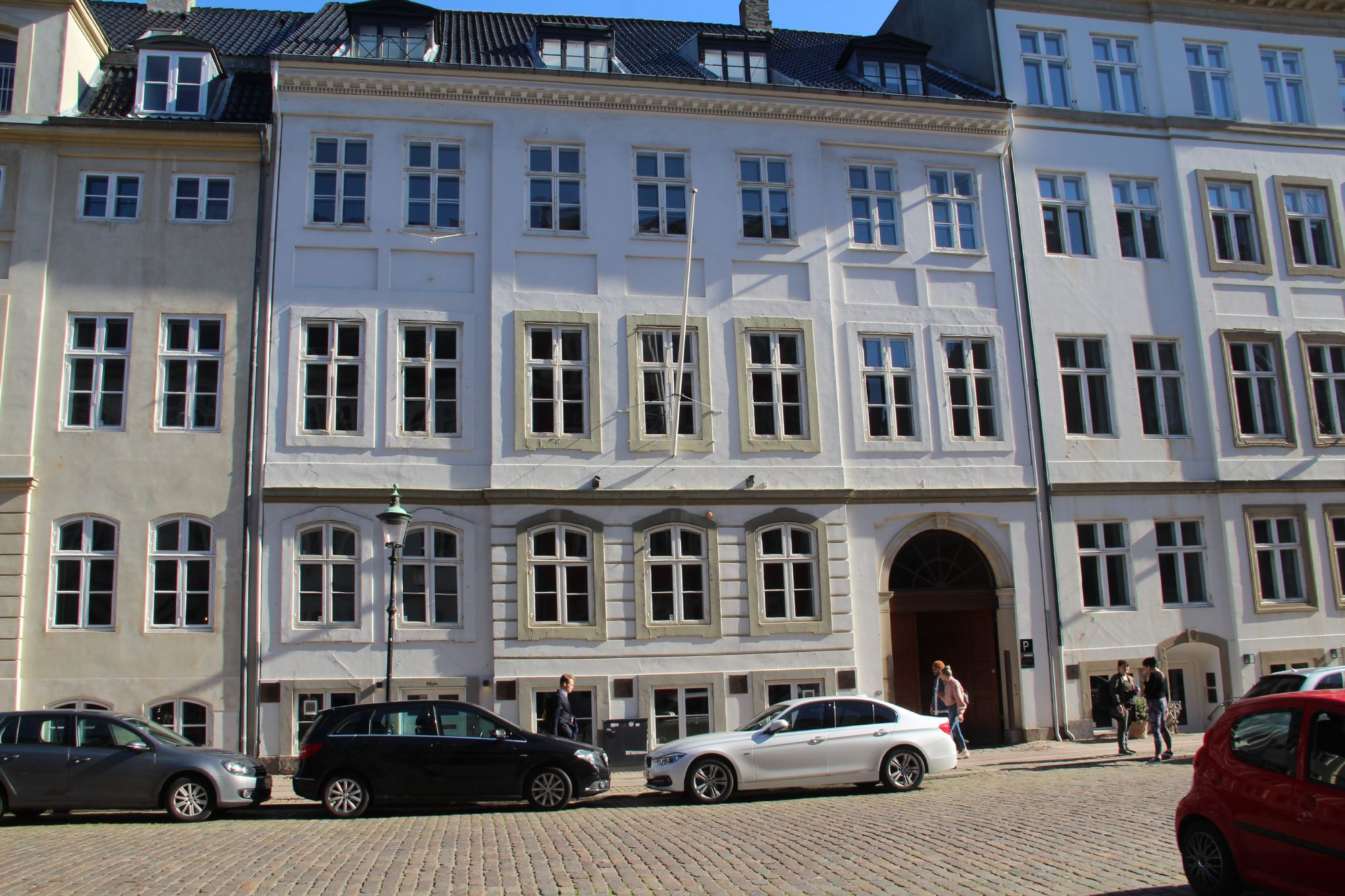
- Amaliegade 14
- Interactive map of the Amaliegade 14 area

General information
- Architectural style: Rococo
- Location: Copenhagen, Denmark, Denmark
- Completed: 1755

Design and construction
- Architect: Niels Eigtved

Amaliegade 14 is a Rococo-style building in the Frederiksstaden neighbourhood of central Copenhagen, Denmark. It was listed on the Danish registry of protected buildings and places in 1918.

== History ==
=== 18th century ===
Amaliegade 14 was built for Anne Krieger in 1755. It was designed by Niels Eigtved, who a few years prior had also created the master plan for the new district. In the new cadastre of 1756, it was listed as No. 71 K2. On Christian Gedde's map of St. Ann's East Quarter from 1757, it was marked as No. 318.

The property was sold to colonel Gustav Friedrich von Isenburg-Büdingen in 1756.

Former governor of Danish India Hermann Abbestée acquired the property in 1794. He had returned to Copenhagen in September 1789.

=== Staal Hagen family, 1795–1846 ===
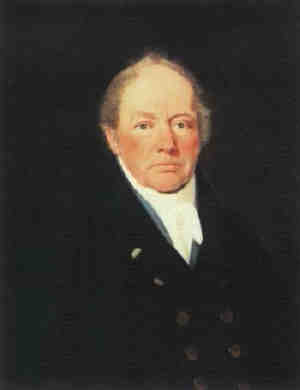
Hans Staal Hagen

After Abbestée's death, the property was sold at auction on 4 March 1795. The buyer was merchant Hans Staal Hagen (1764–1834). Steen Andersen Bille (1751–1833), geheimeråd and prime minister, resided in the building from 1795 to 1797.

Frederik Moltke, who would later serve as privy councillor from 1810 to 1914, lived in the building from 1799 to 1810. He was a close friend of the poet Johannes Ewald.

Staal-Hagen's property was home to 26 residents in seven households at the 1834 census. Hans Staal Hagen resided on the ground floor with his wife Anna Sophie Hagen født Munk, 53-year-old Annine Wilhelmine Hagen, 10-year-old Annette Charlotte Hagen and three maids. Carl Frederik Chr. Ahlefeldt Laurvig, a count and royal marshall, resided on the first floor with his wife Antoinette Ahlefeldt født Juel Wind Frijes, their six children (aged four to 15), one male servant and three maids. Carl Otto Emil Schlegel, a captain in the Engineering Corps, resided on the second floor with pme servamt. Magnus Christian Puggaard, a royal bookkeeper with title of kammerråd, resided on the same floor. Hartvig Wilberg, an office clerk, resided on the second floor of the side wing with the assistant and court mechanician Christian Foss. Two of Danneskiold-Samsøe's servants resided in the cross wing. Anders Jensen, a concierge, resided in the basement with his wife Inger Jensen født Andresen.

The property was home to 28 residents in three households at the 1840 census. Ane Sophie Hagen resided on the second floor with her daughter Anna Wilhelmine Hagen, her granddaughter Anette Charlotte Hagen, a concierge, the concierge and one maid. Ludvig Gottfred Fürst resided on the ground floor with his wife Augusta Christiane Ebbesen, their two-year-old son, two office clerks, three male servants and one maid. Carl Friederich Christopher Ahlefeldt Laurvig, a ritmester, resided on the first floor with his wife Antoinette Nancy Ahlefeld Laurvig, their six children (aged six to 19), two male servants and three maids.

=== F. P. Sommer, 1846–1849 ===
The wholesale merchant F. P. Sommer owned the property from 1840 to 1851. His property was home to 27 residents in three households at the 1845 census. Ludv.Gottf.Fürst, a wholesale merchant (grosserer), resided in the building with his wife Augusta Christiane Fürst (née Ebbesen), their three children (aged three to seven), two male servants and three maids. Carl Fried.Christ.Ahlefeldt resided in the building with his wife Antoinette Nancy Ahlefeldt, their six children (aged 10 to 24) two male servants and three maids. Ane Sophie Hagen, a widow with means, resided in the building with her daughters Anina Wilhelmine Petrea Hagen and Annette Charlotte Hagen and one maid.

=== Philip Heyman, 1849–1851 ===
Wulff Philip Heyman, who owned the property from 1840 to 1851, was the father of Isaac and Philip Heyman. Carl Frederik Rentzmann, who owned the property from 1851 to 1858, was the father of the civil servant Peter Nicolai Rentzmann.

=== Carl Frederik Rentzmann, 1851–1858 ===
In 1851 Carl Frederik Rentzmann bought the building. Steen Andersen Bille (1797–1883), a son of the earlier resident by the same name, was a resident in the building from 1857 to 1869.

=== Knudtzon family, 1858–1913 ===
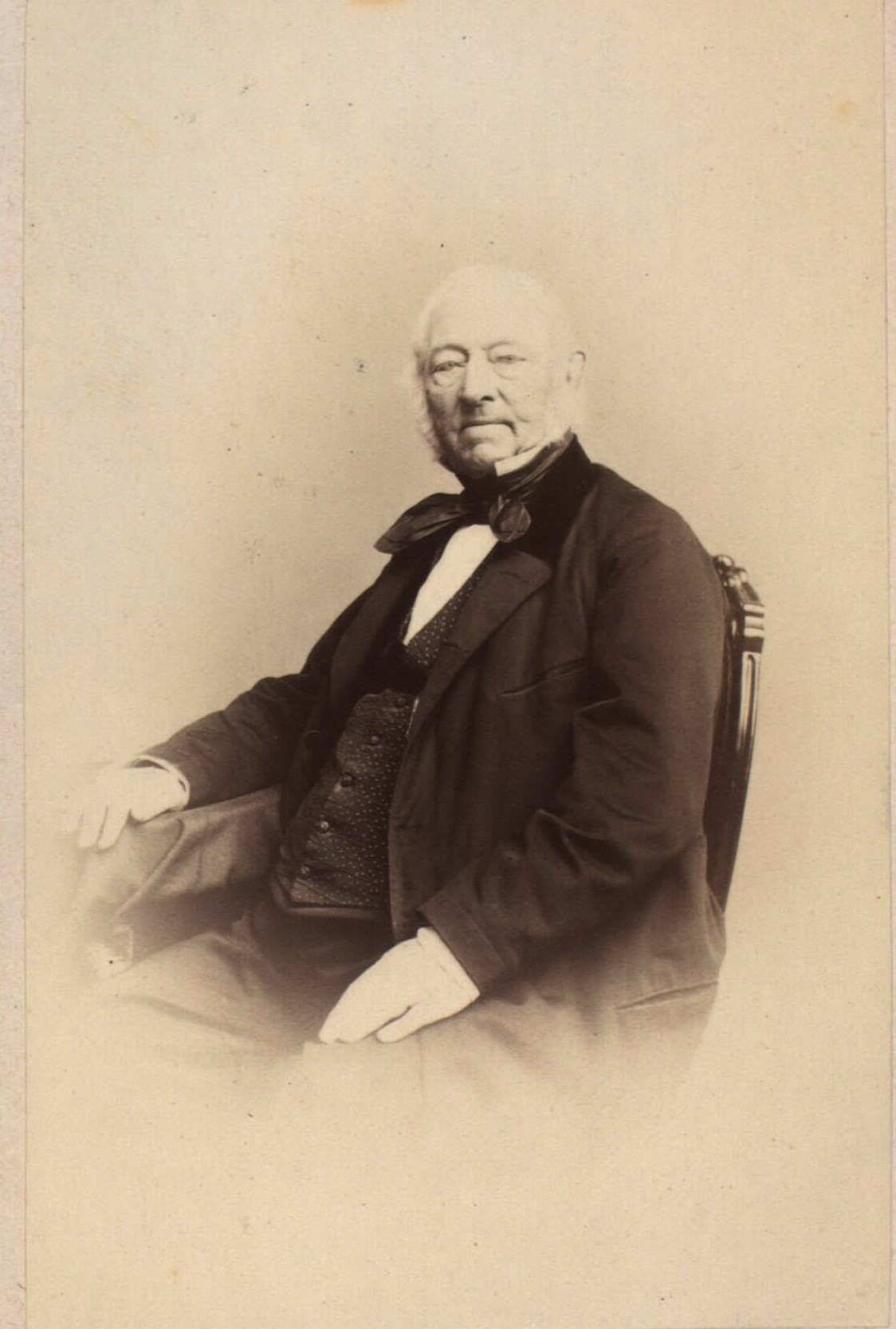
Knudtzon, Peter Christian (1789-1864)-

In 1858, Amaliegade 14 was acquired by Peter Christian Knudtzon. He was one of the largest merchants trading in Iceland. His widow Lucinde kept the property following her husband's death in 1864. David Baruch Adler, a merchant, banker and politician, was among her tenants from 1870 but moved when he purchased the Gustmeyer House in 1873.

Knudtzon's eldest son, Søren Christian Knudtzon, joined his father's firm. He would later also serve as director of the National Bank of Denmark.The building in Amaliegade was after his mother's death passed to him.

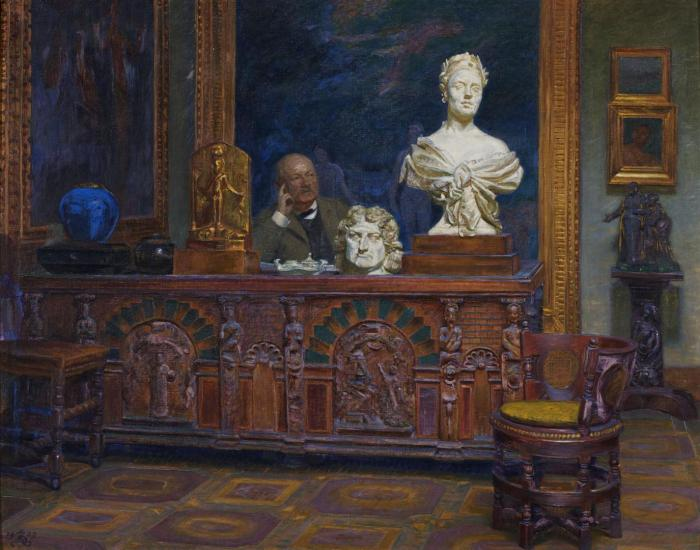
Kristian Zahrtmann: The Artist's Studio at Amaliegade 14, 1909.

The painter Kristian Zahrtmann resided on the third floor from 1893. Zahrtmann was a good friend of Frederik Gotschalk Knudtzon. They had met each other in Italy. He had used Søren Christian Knudtzon as a model when painting his Don Juan back in 1885. He moved to a newly built house, Casa d-Antino, Mariendalsvej 79, in 1913.

On Knudtzon's death in 1913, Amaliegade 14 was sold to textile merchant Carl Lauritzen.

=== 1910–present ===
The composer Hakon Schmedes was among the residents of the building in 1910.

The Swiss Embassy was based in the building from 1929. It later moved to Hellerup in 2015.

In 1940, Amaliegade 14 was acquired by Valerius Ragoczy. He had made a fortune in the leather industry and was also the owner of the summer residence Smidstrupøre in Rungsted. He was married to the sculptor Laura Ragoczy. He had recently partnered with Louis H. Poulsen to form Poulsen & Ragogczy, a wholesale company trading in leather and hides, which was from then on based at Amaliegade 14. The company was later continued by Ragoczy's son, Lothar Ragoczy, who served as president of the Confederation of Leather Wholesalers in Denmark for some time.

Danish Maritime, an industry organisation for manufacturers of ships and maritime equipment, was based on the first floor from 2015 until 31 December 2017.

== Architecture ==
The building is seven bays wide and has a three-bay median risalit. The facade is divided horizontally by a cornice between the first and second floor. Under the roof runs another cornice supported by corbels. The complex also comprises a seven bay long side wing and a five-bay rear wing.

== Today ==
The building is owned by the property company Jeudan and used as office space. A number of companies are based in it, including Portchain.

== List of owners ==
- (1753–1756) Justitsraadinde Anne Krieger
- (1756–1763) G. F. Ysenborg
- (1763–1766) Frederick Charles Ferdinand, Duke of Brunswick-Lüneburg
- (1766–1780) Etatsraad J. Pieper
- (1780–1788) Generalmajor H. Ax Ahlefeldt
- (1788–1794) Justitsraad P. Prihn
- (1794–1795) Hermann Abbestée
- (1795–1846) Hans Staal Hagen
- (1846–1849) Wholesaler F. P. Sommer
- (1849–1851) Wulff Philip Heyman
- ( 1851–1858) Carl Frederik Rentzmann
- (1858–1864) Peter Christian Knudtzon
- (1864–1889) Lucinde Knutzon
- (1889–1913) Søren Christian Knudtzon
- (1913–1916) Mannefakturhandler C. Lauritzen
- (1916–1934) Manufacturer H. N. Petersen
- (1934–1940) Wholesaler F. Jørgensen
- (1940–1957) Valerius Ragoczy
- (1957–) Poulsen & Ragogczy

== See also ==
- Listed buildings in Copenhagen Municipality
