= Christian August Broberg =

Danish merchant and politician

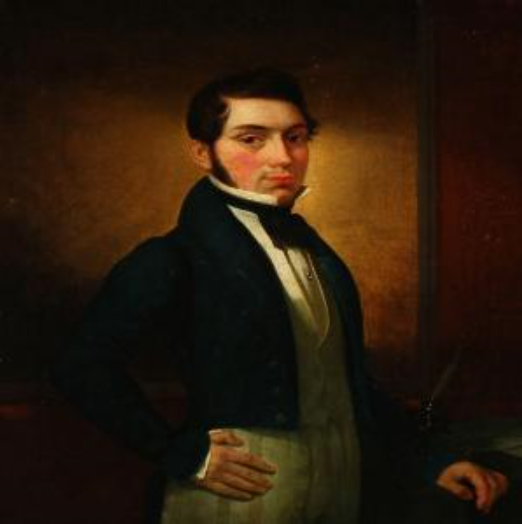
- Broberg painted by David Monies
- Born: 8 April 1811; Copenhagen, Denmark
- Died: 30 April 1884 (aged 73); Copenhagen, Denmark
- Occupations: Merchant, ship owner, ship builder
- Awards: Commander of the Dannebrog, 1874

Christian August Broberg (3 April 1811 – 30 April 1886) was a Danish merchant, ship owner and politician. His company, C. Broberg & Søn, founded by his father in 1805, was the largest importer of coffee to the Nordic countries in the 1860s and early 1870s but collapsed during the coffee crisis of 1874 as a result of high-risk, speculative transactions undertaken by his son.

== Early life and education ==
Broberg was born in Copenhagen, the son of merchant and ship-owner Christian Mortensen Broberg (1776–1852) and Anna Cosine Edsleff (1774–1851). He became an apprentice in his father's office from 1828 and then continued his education abroad. He came to Messina in 1832 where he worked for Ferd. Baller & Co. and became a partner. He returned to Copenhagen in 1835.

== Chr. Broberg & Søn ==
Broberg's father had established his company in 1805 and it acquired its first ship Aurora in 1814. It was initially involved in the import of exotic fruit and other colonial goods from Asia but would later specialize in the lucrative coffee trade.

On 1 January 1836, Broberg became a partner in the family firm which now changed its name to Chr. Broberg & Søn. He headed the company after his father's death in 1852. Chr. Broberg & Søn was the first trading house in the Nordic countries which established direct trade relations to Brazil (E. Jonston & Co., Rio and Santos) in competition with those in Hamburg. He brought the coffee home in his own fleet of merchant ships and became one of the largest ship-owners in Denmark of his time. In the 1860s, it was by far the largest Nordic importer of coffee.

Broberg & Søn was hit hard by the 1874 international coffee crisis. Christian August Broberg was abroad and had left the company in the hands of his son, Carl August B.s (1846–1917), who had engaged in risky, speculative transactions. Broberg hurried back to Copenhagen but was unable to prevent the loss of almost his entire fortune.

=== Ships ===
This list is incomplete

Name	Image	Owned	Type	Built	Comments	Reference
Frederik		1813 or 1814 - 1817	Ketch	1809/1813	Broken up after wreck on 26 November 1831	Ref
Aurora		1814 / 1837				Ref
Dan(n)eschold		1814-1820	Schooner	Before 1814	Wrecked in 1820	Ref
De Jonge Norman		1814-1817	Sloop	1814	Sold to Gregorius Rydahl in 1817	Ref
Anna		1818-1831	Schooner	1810	Sank in 1831	Ref
Der Anfang		1815-1833	Ketch	1810	Wrecked on 1 February 1833	
De fire søskende		1815-1833	Yacht	1803	Wrecked in 1833	Ref
De Quelle		1826-1834	Brig/cutlass/bysse	1777	Wrecked in 1834	Ref
Christian August		1831-1839	Brig	1804		Ref
Chonqua		1831-1839	Brig	1824	Wrecked off Gotland on 2 November 1839	Ref
Ida		1833-1837	Schooner	1833	Wrecked in 1 December 1837	Ref
Hercules		1839-1860	Barque	1839 by Hans Peter Carstensen (Danish) at Josefinevarvet	Sold in 1860 to England	Ref
Brazilianeren		1846-1866	Brig	1846 by H.P. Carstensen et al	Sold to B.J. Jans (Dragør) in 1869	Ref
Alart		1849-1863	Skonnertbrig	1849 in Kerteminde	Renamed Dannevirke in 1863. Sold to A.H. Carlsen Marstal in 1874	Ref
Foreningen		1854-1875	Barque	1854	Wrecked on 14 December 1875 at Dunkerque on the way from Newcastle to Martinique	Ref
Gertrude Sarauw		1855-1863	Skonnertbrig	1849	Sold on 1 January 1863 to H. A. Clausen	Ref
Augusta Aurora		1861-1864	Schooner	1856 by S.P. Bech		Ref

== Other occupations ==
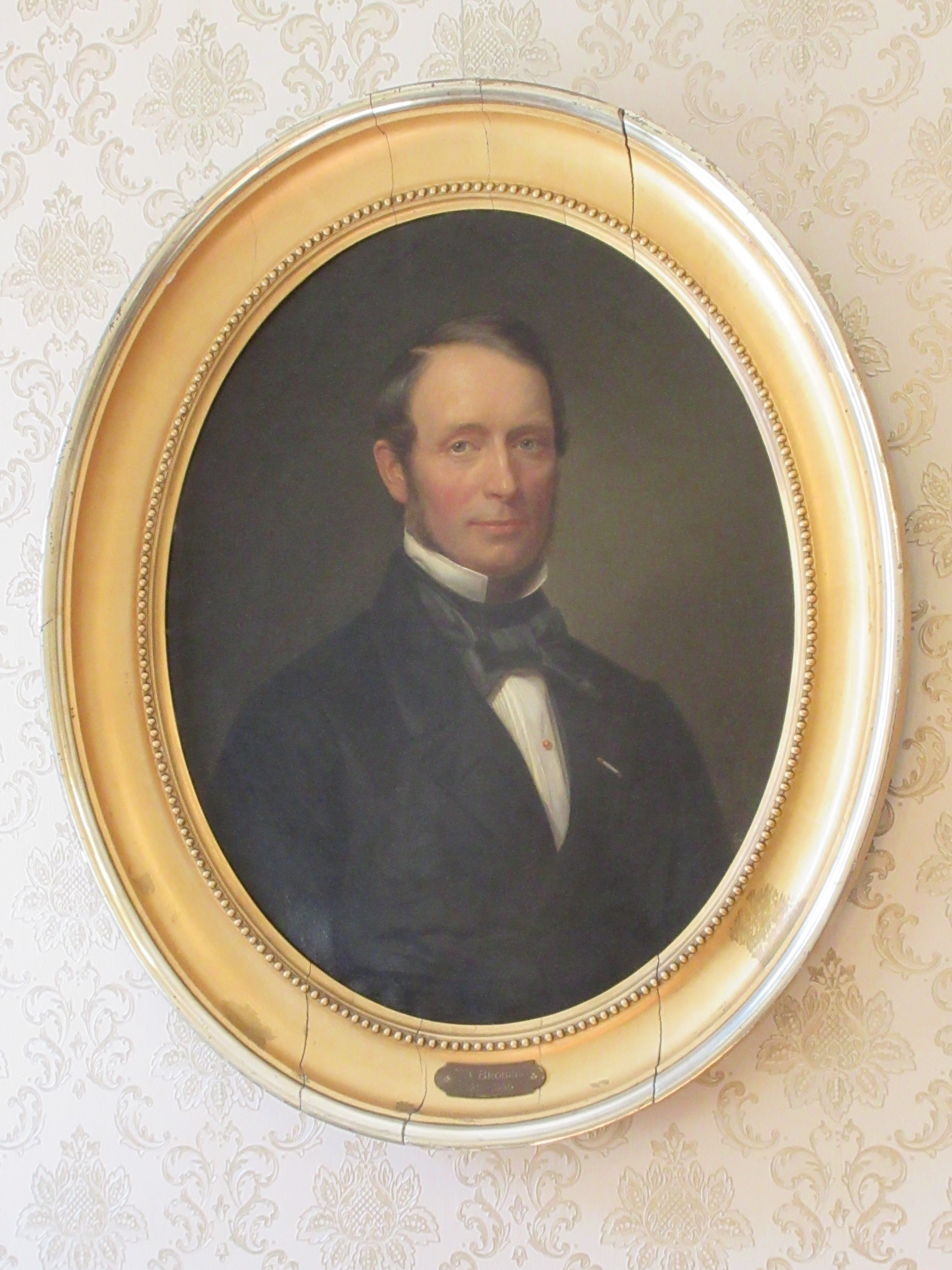
Painting of C. A. Broberg in the Geering House in Copenhagen

Broberg was also involved in the establishment of a number of other ventures. He was elected for the board of representatives of the Bank of Denmark in 1844. He was one of the founders of Lånebanken in 1853. In 1857, he was also a co-founder of Privatbanken and remained a member of the bank council until his death. Broberg was a driving force behind the appointment of Carl Frederik Tietgen to bank manager and later secured him extensive freedom of action. Broberg was a board member of many of the successful companies later founded by Tietgen.

== Politics, public office and honors ==
Broberg was a member of Grosserer-Societetet's committee from February 1743 to 1863 and was its vice president from February 1856.

He was a member of the Copenhagen City Council from 1845 to 1851 and was elected to the Folketinget in Copenhagen's 2nd constituency in December 1849. He ran for reelection in the same constituency but lost to Alfred Hage. He was instead reelected in the 3rd constituency in the by-election in July 1854, but left the office in May 1856 after being elected to Rigsrådet (Privy Council) in February that same year. He was a member of Rigsrådet until 1863 and was elected to the Landsting in 1864 but left office in 1866. From 1882 to 1886, he was persuaded to return to the Landsting. He was a driving force behind the sale of Børsen to Grosserer-Societetet in 1855–1856. As a politician, he was mainly interested in mercantile issues.

Broberg was awarded the Order of the Dannebrog in 1851, became Dannebrogsmand in 1854 and a Commander of the Dannebrog in 1874. He was awarded the title etatsråd in 1857.

== Personal life ==
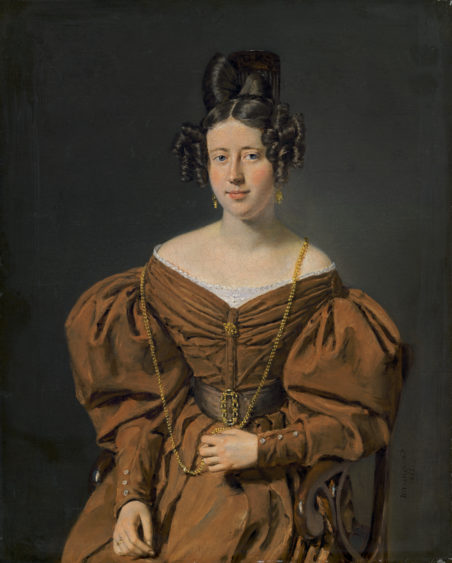
Ida Frederikke Broberg

Broberg married Ida Frederikke Gotschalk (1814–1877), daughter of merchant and Consul-General Frederik Gotschalk (1786–1869) and Marie Frederikke Kierulf (1791–1870), on 21 November 1835 in St. Peter's Church in Copenhagen.

They had three daughters and a son. The son, Carl Broberg, continued the company after his father's retirement in 1882. The shipping activities had been discontinued after the 1874 crisis but it was still active under the name Chr. Broberg, Søn / Co. in 1910. One of Carl Broberg's daughters, Dorit Vroberg, married Harald Heering of the Heering family.

Broberg died on 30 April 1886 and is buried in the Cemetery of Holmen. Brobergsgade, a street in Christianshavn, is named after him.
