= Peter Christian Knudtzon =

Danish businessman

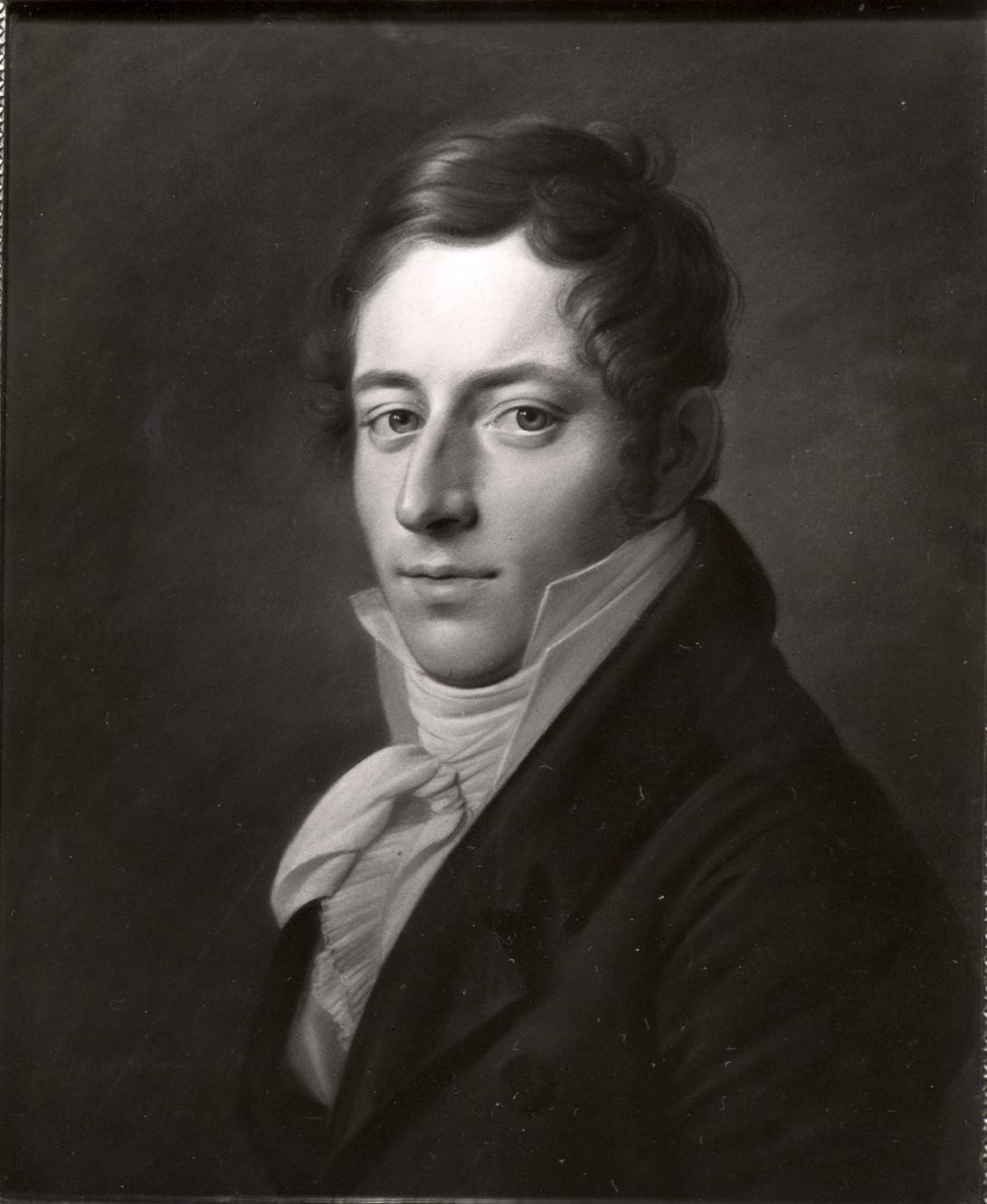
- Peter Christian Knudtzon by Hornemann
- Born: 19 March 1789; Kristiansund, Norway
- Died: 17 November 1864 (aged 75); Copenhagen, Denmark
- Occupation: Businessman

Peter Christian Knudtzon (19 March 1789 – 17 November 1864) was a Danish businessman and ship-owner. He was one of the largest traders in Iceland in the middle of the 19th century. He owned Amaliegade 14 in Copenhagen. He was the father of Governor of the Bank of Denmark Søren Christian Knudtzon.

== Early life and family background ==
Knudtzon was born on 19 March 1789 in Kristiansund, Norway, the son of merchant Nicolay Heinrich Knudtzon (1751–1842) and Janicke Fasting (1762–1848). His father was one of the town's leading merchants. His paternal uncle, Hans Carl Knudtzon, was also a successful merchant. Knudtzon was raised in Slesvig, from which his father had emigrated to Norway in 1780. After moving to Copenhagen at the age of 16, he initially worked for J. J. Holbech.

== Career ==
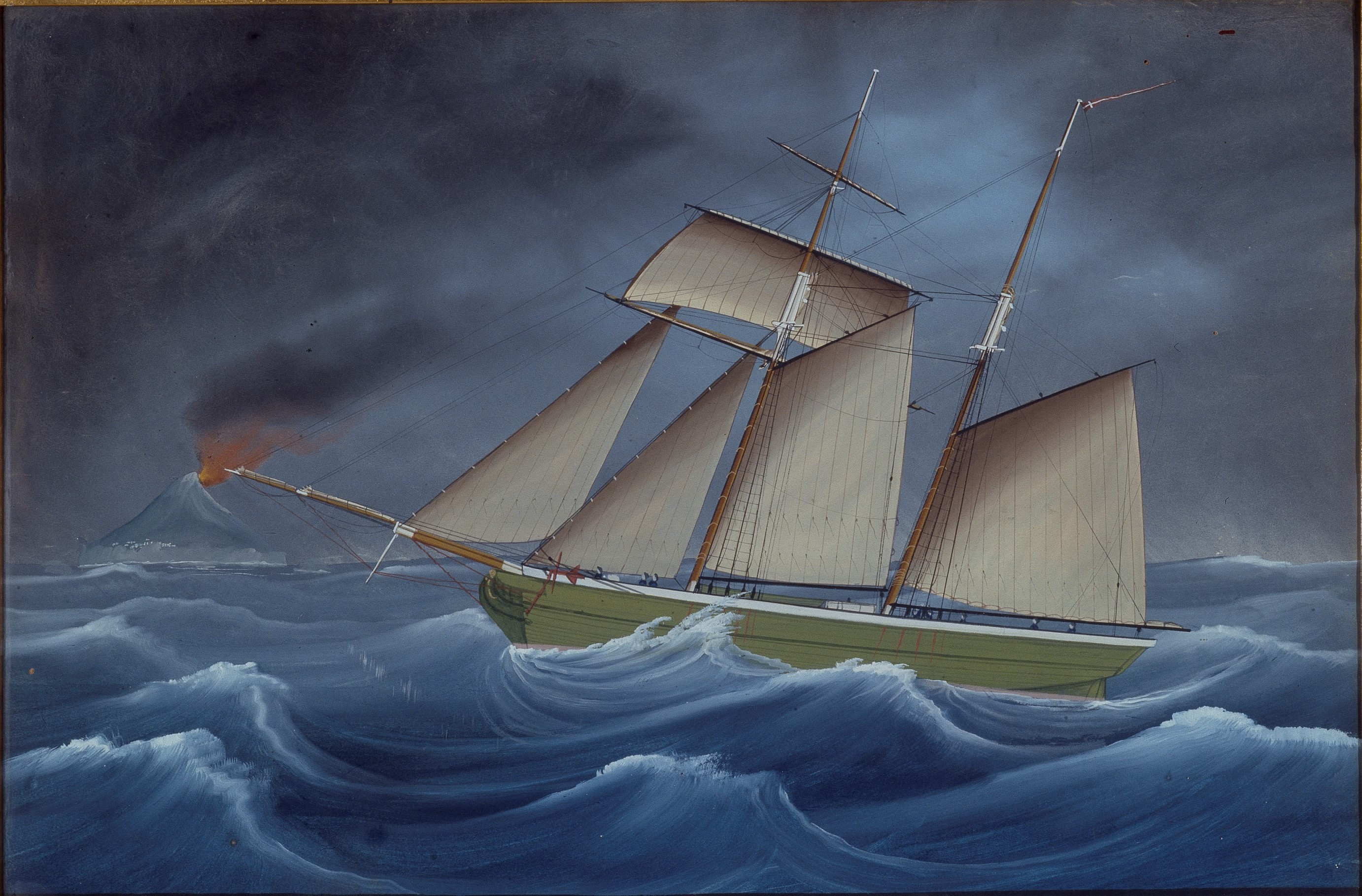
Knudtzon's schooner Lucinde with Vesuvio in the background, 1747.

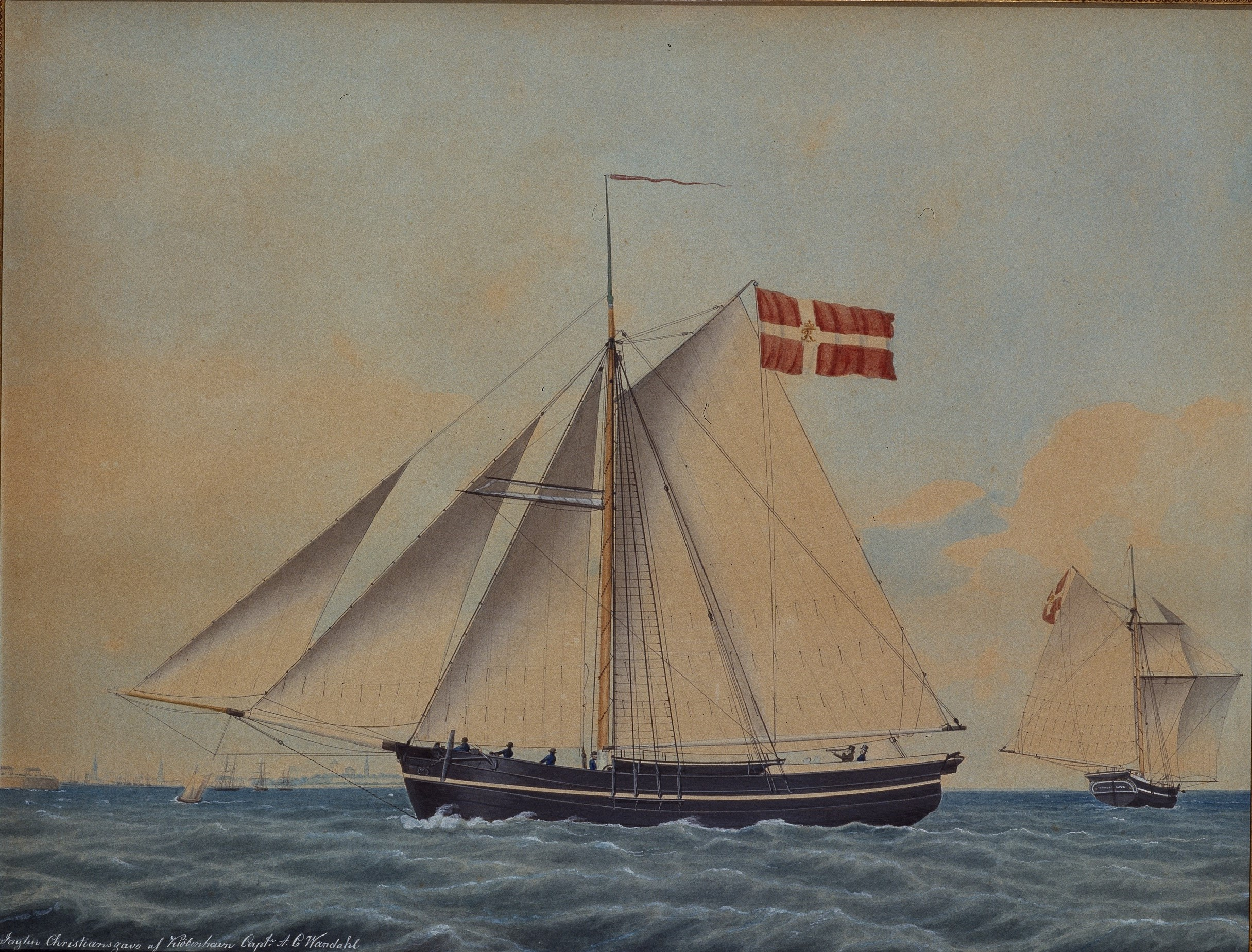
Knudtzon's yacht Christiansgave, 1848.

In 1810, Knudtzon started his own business. He engaged in a number of speculative investments, especially on the property market in Copenhagen, with considerable success. In 1814, Knudtzon and two brothers-in-law took over his father-in-law's trading business in Iceland. The turbulent times during the war years of 1807 to 1814 brought him many difficulties, bringing him close to bankruptcy in 1818 and 1820, but both times with quick comebacks. In the 1830s, he completely dominated trade on the southern part of the island. A fleet of smaller fishing vessels picked up salt in Spain and returned with dried and salted cod for the Mediterranean market. In 1842, he was hit a third time by economic difficulties but again managed to recover fairly quickly.

In 1834 he founded Icelands first and Oldest Bakery Bernhöftsbakari

In 1855, P. C. Knudtzon & Søn's fleet consisted of the brigs Wilhelmine and Johanne, the schooners Harriet, Louise, Lucinde and Marie, the galleass Emmy, and the yachts Anna Helena, Cathinca, Christiansgave, Kis and Orøven.

== Politics and public offices ==
In 1824, Knudtzon was elected to the Council of 32 Men. In the 1830s, he was elected to the Roskilde Constituent Assembly in the first election period (1835–1840). From 1847 to 1848, he was a member of the Grossist Society's committee.

In 1831, he was instrumental in establishing the Grossist Society's relief fund (Danish: understøttelsesfond), together with his friend Christian Rønnenkamp and the firm Hambro & Søn.

== Personal life ==
Knudtzon married Marie Thomsen (1 October 1788 – 25 July 1831) on 24 June 1810. She was daughter of merchant Jess Thomsen (1734–1816) and Engel Knutzen (c. 1748–1829). They had one son, Jes Nicolai Knudtzon (1811–1840). Following the death of his first wife on 13 November 1839, Knudtzon married Lucinde Gotschalk (17 March 1818 – 17 December 1888) in St. Peter's Church in Copenhagen. She was the daughter of merchant Frederik (Friedrich) Gotschalk (1786–1869) and Marie Frederikke Kierulf (1791–1870). From 1757, Knudtzon was the owner of the property at Amaliegade 14 in Copenhagen. He died on 17 November 1864 and is buried in the Assistens Cemetery.

He was survived by the following children:

- Nicolay Henrich Knudtzon (31 July 1841 – 18 July 1925)
- Frederik Gotschalk Knudtzon (11 January 1843 – 14 May 1917)
- Søren Christian Knudtzon (16 July 1844 – 12 August 1913)
- Jørgen Bailli Knudtzon (15 September 1847 – 29 March 1909)
- Bertha Knudtzon (24 February 1850 – 4 May 1923)
- Marie Lucinde Knudtzon (26 October 1851 – 28 April 1926)
- Harriet Knudtzon (16 February 1855 – 24 May 1927), married dermatologist Ludvig Nielsen.
- Benedicte Knudtzon (23 September 1856 – 14 May 1940), married zoologist Jonas Collin.
