= Carl Gottlob Rafn =

Danish Enlightenment scientist and civil servant

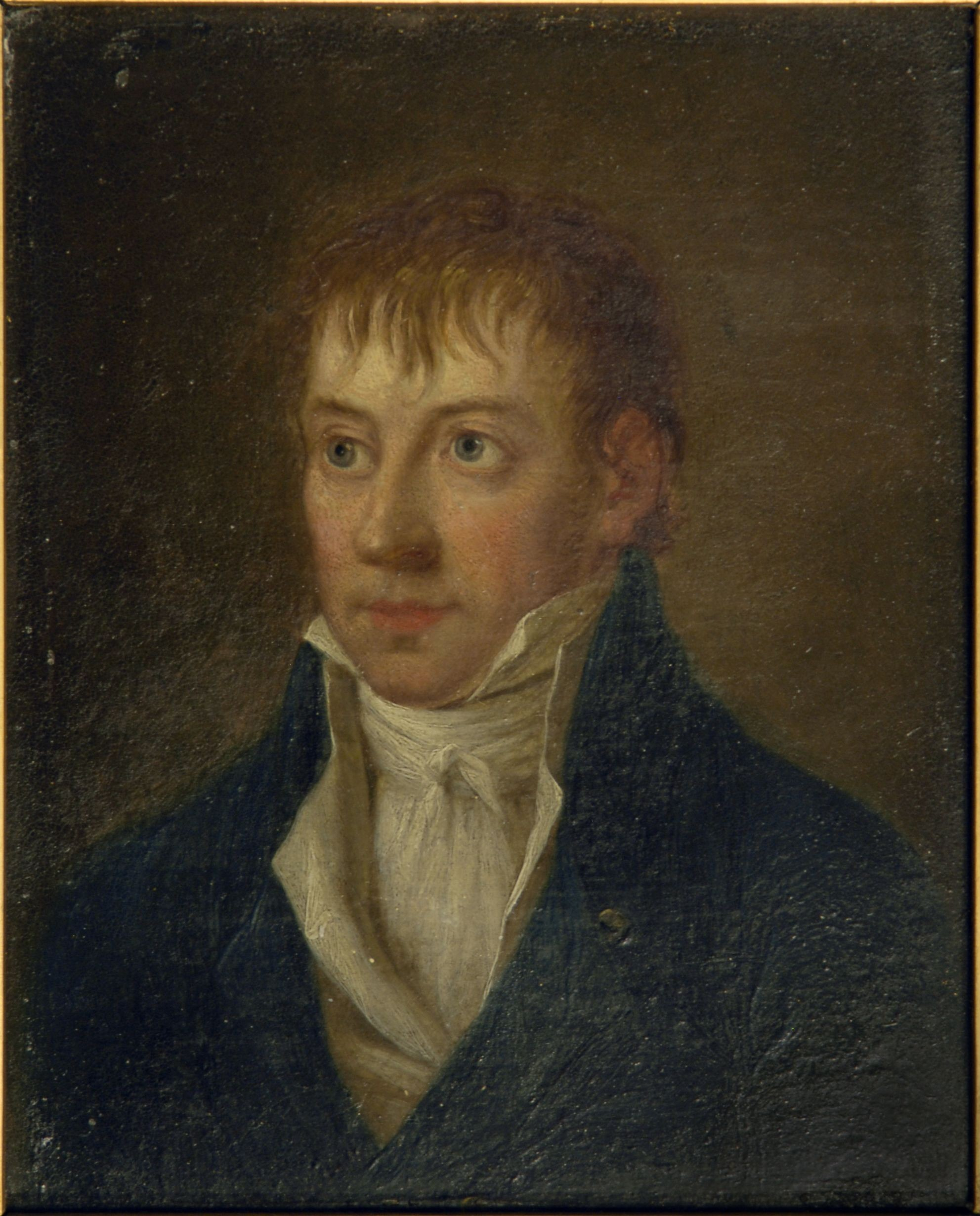
Carl Gottlob Rafn, painted by Hansen

Carl Gottlob Rafn (31 July 1769 – 17 May 1808) was a Danish Enlightenment scientist and civil servant. He wrote influential papers on a broad array of basic and applied sciences.

== Life ==
Rafn was born in Viborg, Denmark as the son of a judge. He began studies of medicine and botany at the University of Copenhagen in 1788, but later changed to veterinary science with P.C. Abildgaard at the Veterinary School in Copenhagen. He never took any final exam, however. Instead, he became Assessor in the Ministries of Agriculture and Commerce under the Danish absolute monarchy and filled various other posts, such as being the first director of a new Royal Aquavit Distillery, which was founded on his own initiative. Rafn died in Copenhagen in 1808, only 39 years old.

== Scientific works ==
Rafn made contributions to many prize essay contests on all disciplines of science. One of these was a flora of Denmark - Flora of Denmarks and Holstein, for which he was runner-up (the first prize went to J. W. Hornemann for his Forsøg til en dansk økonomisk Plantelære). Part of Rafn’s contribution was a text book on plant physiology. This was also published in a separate volume and translated to other languages.

Together with his friend the physicist J. D. Herholdt, Rafn wrote an account “On the hibernation of animals” that won a prize from the French Institut National.

The same two authors stood behind a small, but influential book entitled An Attempt at an Historical Survey of Life-saving Measures for Drowning Persons and Information of the Best Means by Which They Can Again Be Brought Back to Life from 1794. All knowledge on anesthesia caused by submergence and on resuscitation available at the time was collected. More recently, the book was reprinted – both in Danish and in English translation – on the occasion of the 10 anniversary of the Scandinavian Society of Anaesthesiology and Intensive Care Medicine in 1960. This treatise has been hailed as containing ”an enormous amount of information, and more importantly, wise comment - much of which was visionary and subsequently has been proven to be of key relevance to resuscitation of the submerged victim as practiced today”.

Rafn became a member of the Royal Danish Academy of Sciences and Letters in 1798.

A few names of his making are still in use, e.g. Centaurium erythraea Rafn.
