= Oslo Cathedral =

- Norwegian: Oslo domkirke
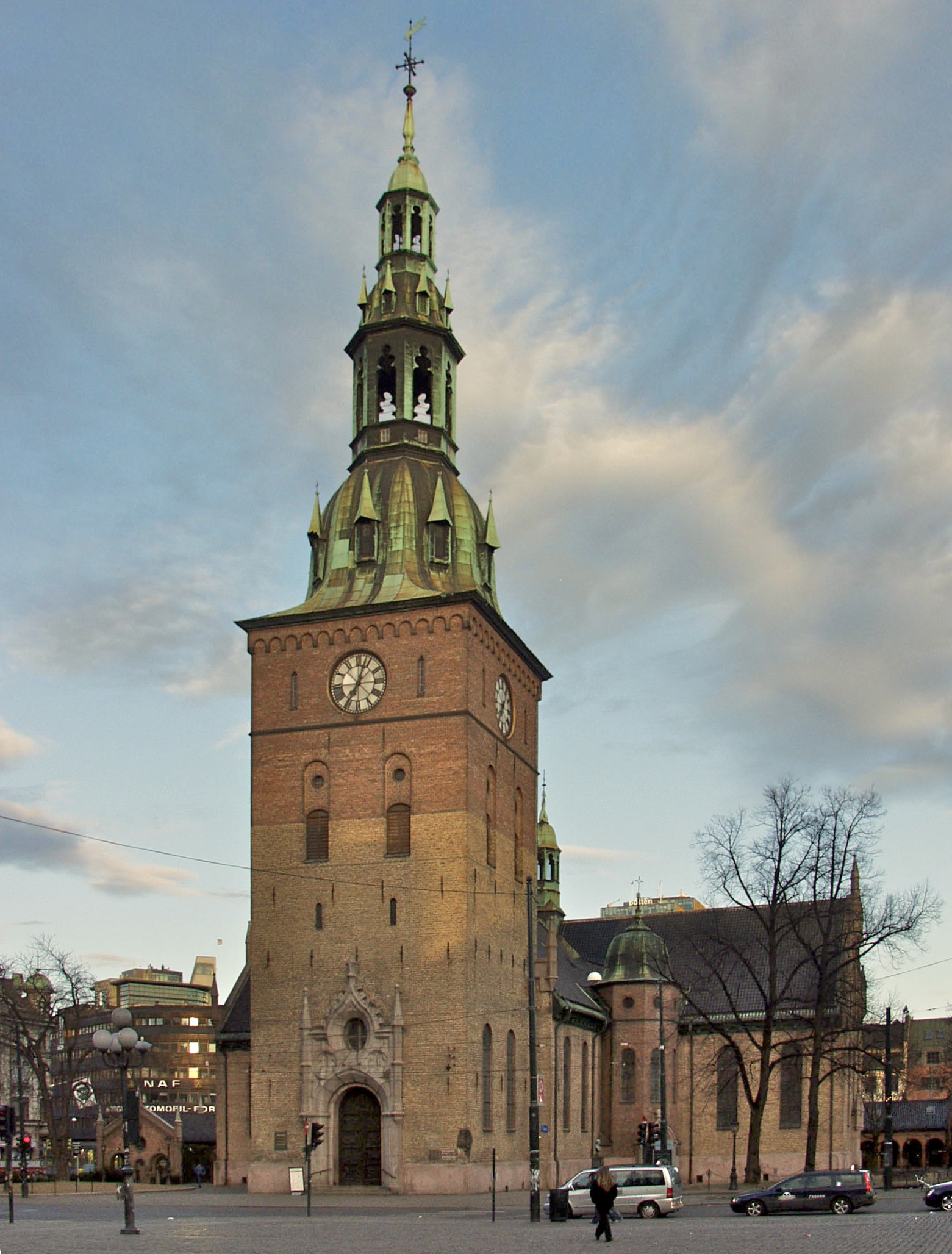
- Oslo Cathedral from Stortorvet

- Location within Oslo Location within Norway
- 59°54′44.35″N 10°44′49.05″E
- Location: Oslo
- Country: Norway
- Denomination: Church of Norway
- Website: www.oslodomkirke.no

History
- Former name: Our Saviour's Church
- Status: Active
- Founded: 1694

Architecture
- Functional status: Cathedral
- Years built: 1694-1697
- Completed: 1697

Administration
- Diocese: Oslo
- Parish: Oslo

Clergy
- Bishop: Sunniva Gylver
- Dean: Pål Kristian Balstad
- Priest(s): Jonas Lind Asgedom

Oslo Cathedral (Norwegian: Oslo domkirke) — formerly Our Savior's Church (Norwegian: Vår Frelsers kirke) — is the main church for the Church of Norway Diocese of Oslo, as well as the parish church for downtown Oslo. The present building dates from 1694 to 1697.

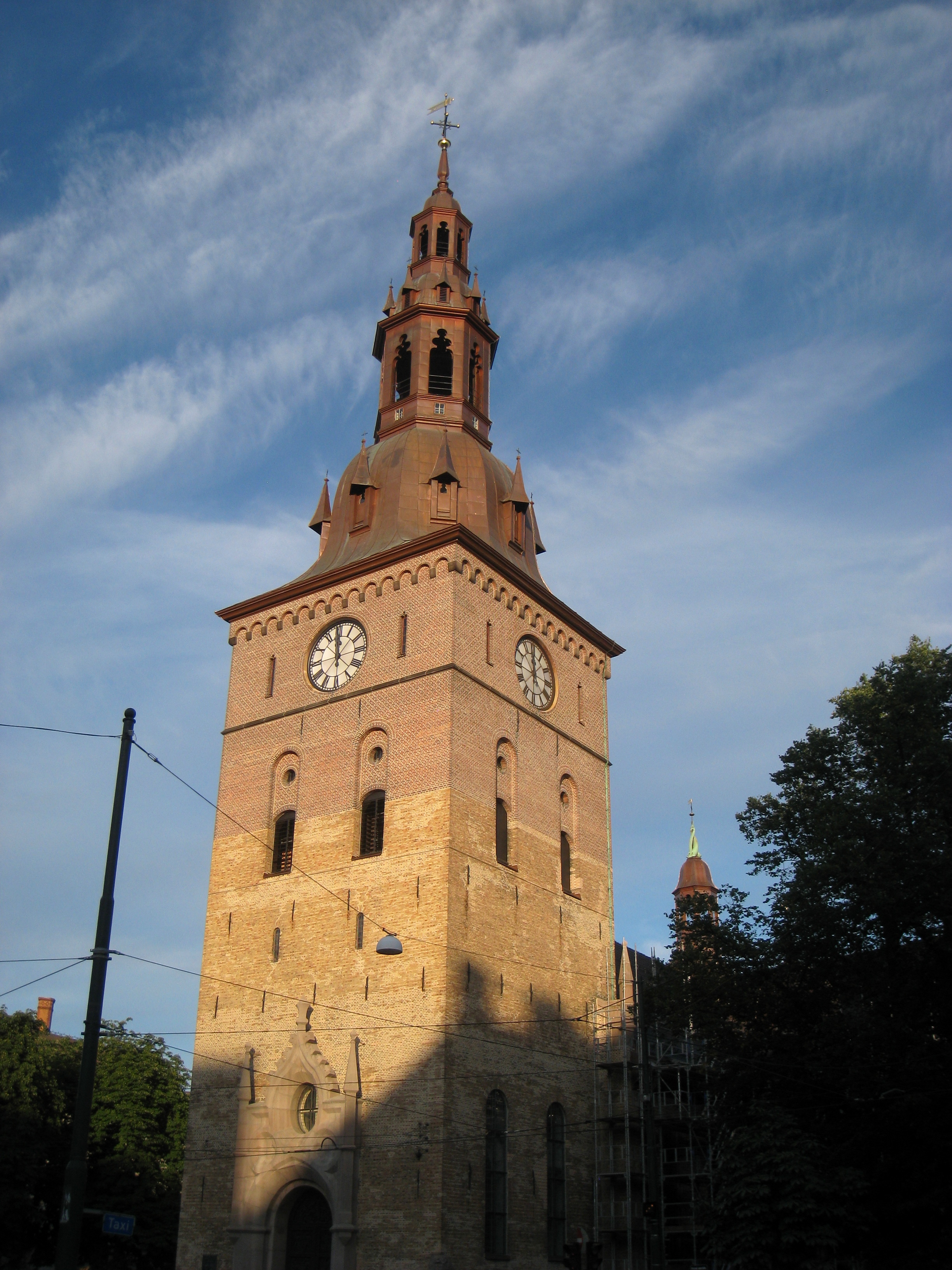
The tower

The Norwegian royal family and the Norwegian Government use the cathedral for public events. It was closed for renovation in August 2006 and re-opened with a festive high mass on 18 April 2010.

== History ==
The current Oslo Cathedral is the third cathedral in Oslo, Norway. The first, Hallvards Cathedral, was built by King Sigurd I of Norway in the first half of the 12th century, and was located by the Old Bishop's Palace in Oslo, some 1.5 kilometres (0.93 mi) east of today's cathedral.

For almost 500 years, Hallvards Cathedral was the most important church in the city. After a great fire in Oslo during 1624, King Christian IV decided to move the city a few kilometers west to be protected by Akershus Fortress. Construction of a new church was begun in 1632, on the main square in the new city. After that, Hallvards Cathedral fell into disrepair and decayed.

In 1639 the second cathedral, Hellig Trefoldighet (Holy Trinity), was built. This cathedral burnt down after only 50 years, however, and the current cathedral was built to replace it. The church was likely designed by Jørgen Wiggers, councillor of state (etatsråd). The current cathedral was erected on a small rocky outcrop in the east end of what would later become Stortorvet. The foundation stone was laid in 1694 and the church was consecrated in November 1697.

In August 2001, Oslo Cathedral was the site of the wedding of Prince Haakon, and Princess Mette-Marit Tjessem Høiby. King Harald V and Queen Sonja of Norway were also married at Oslo Cathedral on 29 August 1968 and the next funeral of the King, to be scheduled on September 9, 2026.

== Restoration ==
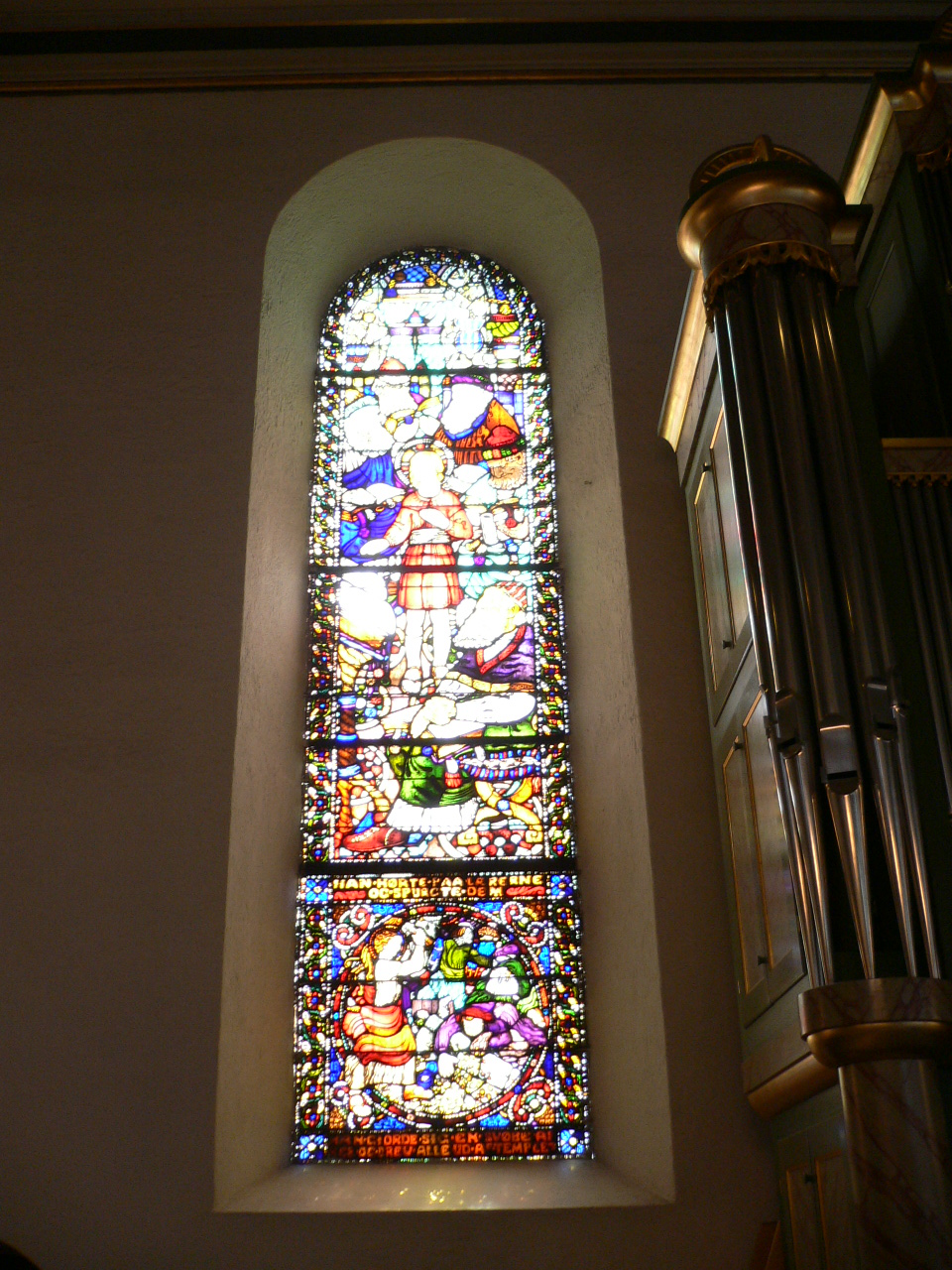
Stained glass window

The cathedral was rebuilt between 1848 and 1850 after a plan by German-born architect, Alexis de Chateauneuf (1799–1853). Another German-born architect, Heinrich Ernst Schirmer (1814–1887) was the construction manager for the project. When Chateauneuf became ill in 1850, Schirmer retained Wilhelm von Hanno (1826–1882) to complete the project.

Oslo Cathedral is located at Stortorvet square north/north-east of Karl Johans gate, between Kirke gate and Dronningens gate. The cathedral's lower end is surrounded by the Bazaar (Basarene ved Oslo domkirke), a curved long building with a tower covered in green copper like the cathedral. Integrated with Basarene is the Fire Watch (Brannvakten) which served as Oslo's main fire station from 1860 until 1939, when today's main fire station at Arne Garborgs plass was opened. The cathedral, Basarene and Brannvakten are all built in red brick. Both Basarene and Brannvakten were built between 1840 and 1859 from the plans of city architect, Christian H. Grosch.

Artwork from recent times in the cathedral includes stained-glass windows in the choir by Emanuel Vigeland installed between 1910 and 1916, west portal bronze doors executed by Dagfin Werenskiold (1892–1977) in 1938, and the silver sculpture with communion scene by Italian sculptor Arrigo Minerbi dating from 1930. The ceiling decorations are by Norwegian painter Hugo Lous Mohr (1889–1970). In the latter half of the 1990s, the main organ built by Ryde & Berg of Fredrikstad, was mounted behind the old baroque facade.

Restoration was completed at the time of the city's 900 anniversary in 1950. The church was restored under the plans of architect Arnstein Arneberg. The neo-Gothic interior was removed and the original furnishings brought back. Arneberg also designed the chapel on the south side of the church. The church was closed in August 2006 for renovation and was opened in April 2010 in the presence of Harald V of Norway and the Norwegian royal family.

== Bishops of Oslo since the Reformation ==
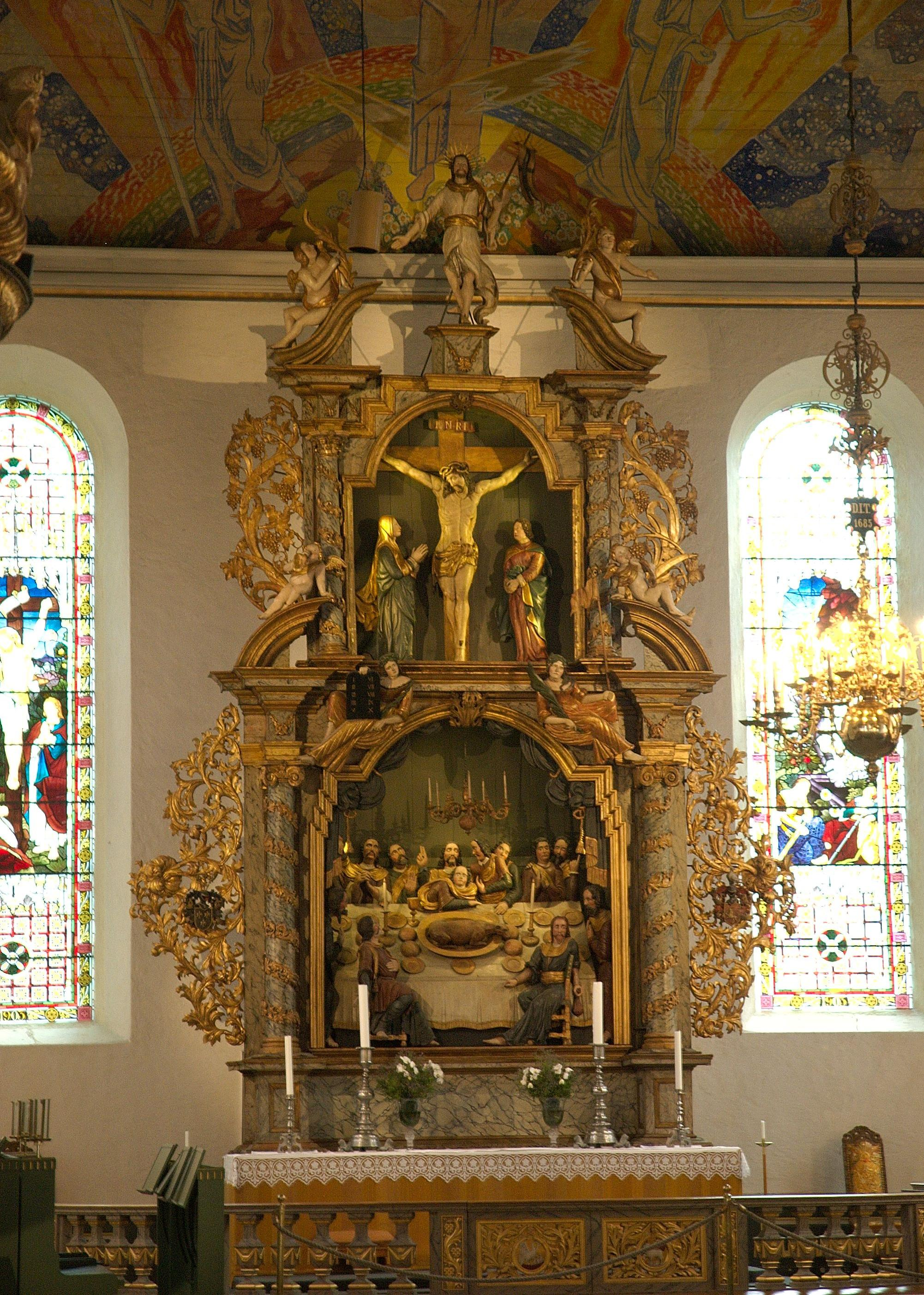
Altar

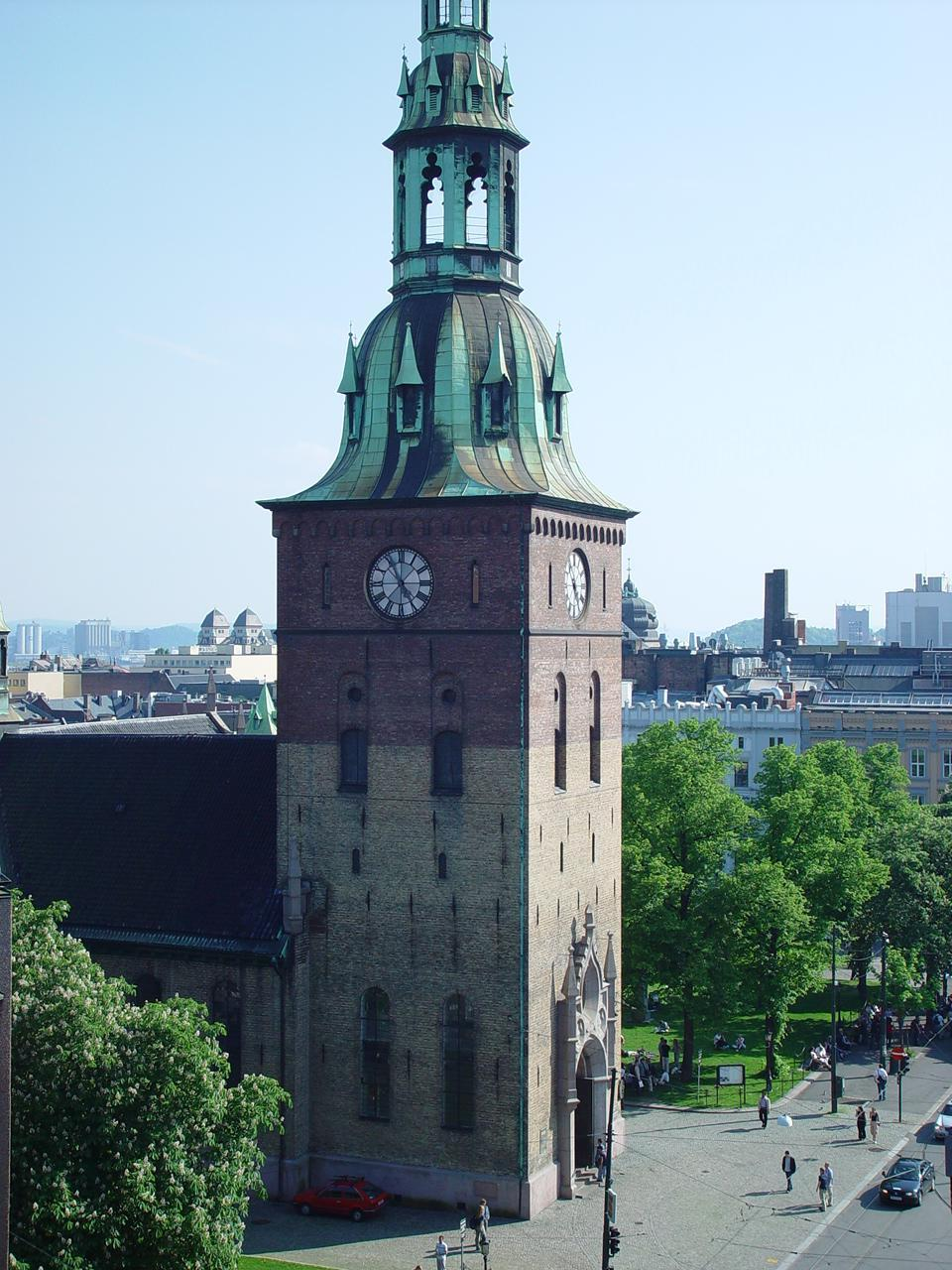
The cathedral

- 1541–1545 Hans Rev
- 1545–1548 Anders Madssøn
- 1548–1580 Frants Berg
- 1580–1600 Jens Nilssøn
- 1601–1607 Anders Bendssøn Dall
- 1607–1617 Niels Claussøn Senning
- 1617–1639 Niels Simonsen Glostrup
- 1639–1646 Oluf Boesen
- 1646–1664 Henning Stockfleth
- 1664–1699 Hans Rosing
- 1699–1712 Hans Munch
- 1713–1730 Bartholomæus Deichman
- 1731–1737 Peder Hersleb
- 1738–1758 Niels Dorph
- 1758–1773 Frederik Nannestad
- 1773–1804 Christen Schmidt
- 1805–1822 Frederik Julius Bech
- 1823–1845 Christian Sørensen
- 1846–1874 Jens Lauritz Arup
- 1875–1893 Carl Peter Parelius Essendrop
- 1893–1896 Frederik Wilhelm Bugge
- 1896–1912 Anton Christian Bang
- 1912–1922 Jens Frølich Tandberg
- 1922–1937 Johan P. Lunde
- 1937–1951 Eivind Berggrav
- 1951–1968 Johannes Smemo
- 1968–1973 Fridtjov Søiland Birkeli
- 1973–1977 Kaare Støylen
- 1977–1998 Andreas Aarflot
- 1998–2005 Gunnar Stålsett
- 2005–2017 Ole Christian Kvarme
- 2017–2024 Kari Veiteberg
- 2025-Present Sunniva Gylver

== Organs and organists ==
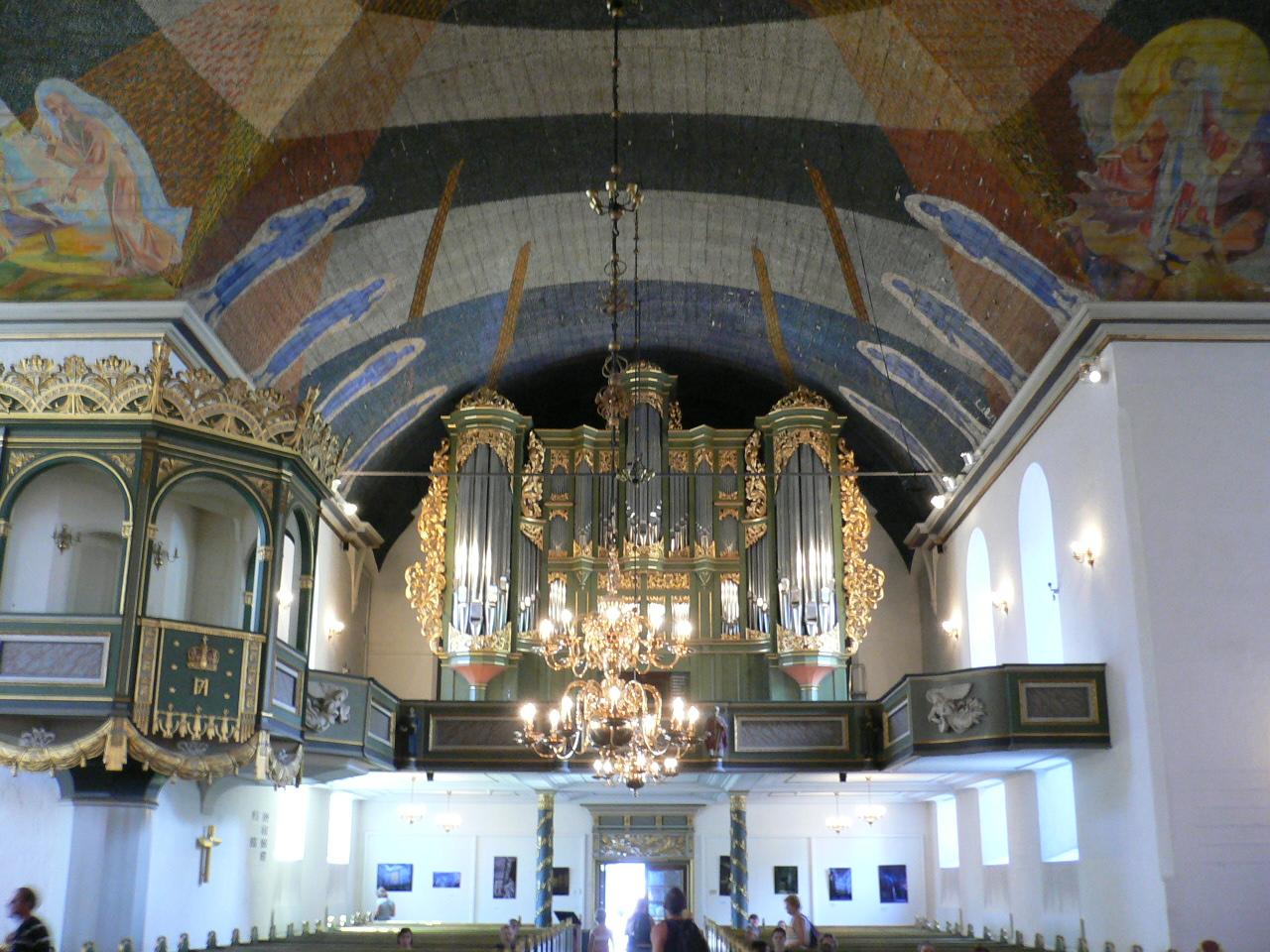
Interior ceiling

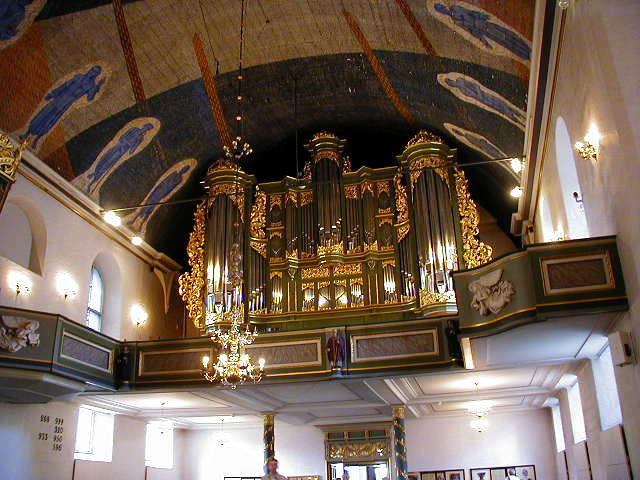
The organ

The cathedral's first organ was built in 1711 by Carl Gustav Luckvitz, while the current main organ was built by Jan Ryde in 1997 for the 300-year anniversary. The two smaller organs in the cathedral were also built by Ryde og Berg Orgelbyggeri.

=== Organists ===
- 1709–1721 Christian Olsen Rode
- 1721–1764 Johan Fredrik Clasen
- 1764–1769 Johan Adolph Pløen
- 1769–1809 Johan Krøyer
- 1809–1828 Fredrik Christian Groth
- 1820–1826 Frederik Christian Lindeman
- 1828–1840 Jacob Andreas Lindeman
- 1840–1887 Ludvig Mathias Lindeman
- 1887–1916 Christian Cappelen
- 1913–1916 Wilhelm Huus-Hansen
- 1916–1932 Eyvind Alnæs
- 1933–1966 Arild Sandvold
- 1966–1982 Rolf Karlsen
- 1982–2015 Terje Kvam
- 1982– Kåre Nordstoga
- 2015– Marcus André Berg

== Carillon and carillonneurs ==
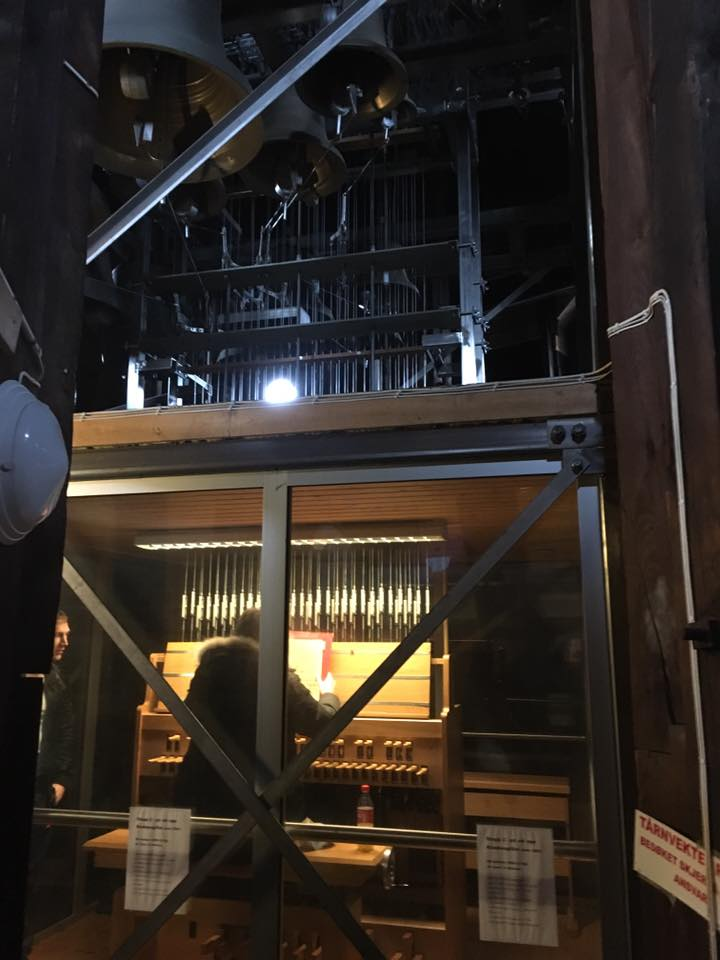
Carillonneur Brynjar Landmark in the carillon cabinet of Oslo Cathedral

In 1924 Oslo Cathedral received a donation of 24,000 NOK for a carillon in the belfry, but this was never implemented. In 2003 a second donation, by Ørnulf Myklestad, resulted in a 48-bell concert carillon under the direction of carillonneur Vegar Sandholt. This carillon is inside the tower, not the belfry; the acoustic problems arising from this location have been highlighted in a 2005 masters thesis by Laura Rueslåtten for the Scandinavian Carillon School.

From December 2016 the carillon has been in regular use for hour, quarter-strokes and ritornelles, with contributions by Vegar Sandholt and Kåre Nordstoga, programmed and maintained by Brynjar Landmark, and with 18 different melodies between 7:00 am and midnight, changing according to the calendar.

== See also ==
- List of cathedrals in Norway
- Church of Norway
- Nidaros Cathedral

== Other sources ==
- Gervin, Karl Oslo domkirke: mennesker og miljøer i 900 år [Oslo Cathedral: People and Community for 900 Years] (1997) ISBN 82-03-22191-2,
- (no) Storsletten, Ola Kirker i Norge, b. 5: Etter reformasjonen : 1600-tallet [Churches in Norway, Vol. 5: After the Reformation: The 1600s] (2008) ISBN 978-82-91399-15-7
- (no) Tronshaug, Hans Jacob Oslo domkirkes orgelhistorie : orgler, organister, kantorer og orgelbyggere gjennom fem århundrer [The Organ of the Oslo Cathedral: Organs, Organists, Cantors and Organ Buiiders through Five Centuries] (1998) ISBN 82-994632-0-3
