= Christoffer Hjort =

Norwegian priest (1561–1616)

- Born: 1561
- Died: 1616 (aged 54–55)
- Education: University of Wittenberg
- Occupation: Clergyman
- Parent: Rasmus Hjort
- Relatives: Frants Berg (grandfather)

Christoffer Hjort (1561–1616) was a Norwegian clergyman and crypto-Catholic. He served as a vicar in Aker and was the priest at the chapel of Akershus Castle, until he was expelled from the country for Catholicism in 1613.

== Personal life ==
Hjort was probably born in Tønsberg. He was the son of Rasmus Hjort, a humanist and the dean at Tønsberg, and his wife Gidse Berg. He was also a grandson of Frants Berg, who was Bishop of the Diocese of Oslo.

== Career ==
Hjort first studied at Oslo Cathedral School, and then in Copenhagen, Rostock and at the Jesuit college of Braunsberg. In 1592 he enrolled at the University of Wittenberg, and from 1593 to 1594 he studied philosophy at the Jesuit college in Olomouc in Moravia. The next year he worked as assistant to the astronomer Tycho Brahe. Back in Norway he was appointed rector at Oslo Cathedral School. From 1602 he served as vicar in Toten, and in 1610 he was appointed as a vicar in Aker and as a priest at the chapel of Akershus Castle.

In 1613 a decision was made to take strong measures in Denmark-Norway against Catholics, especially supporters of the Jesuits, due to fear of the Counter-Reformation movement. Hjort and others were prosecuted for Catholicism and eventually convicted at a trial held at the vicarage of Gjerpen Church. The inquisitor was Niels Claussøn Senning, the Bishop of Oslo. King Christian IV was present at the trial, and had instructed every bishop in the country to attend. Hjort was sentenced to loss of benefice and inheritance and was ordered to leave the country within 12 weeks. His brother Jacob, vicar at Onsøy, was also convicted, as were several other priests. Hjort died near Danzig in 1616.

== See also ==
- Clergy
- Crypto-Christianity
- Aker, Norway
- Akershus Fortress
