= Christoffer Dahl =

Norwegian footballer (born 1984)

Personal information
- Date of birth: 8 January 1984 (age 42)
- Place of birth: Vikersund, Norway
- Height: 1.79 m (5 ft 10 1/2 in)
- Position: Midfielder

Youth career
- Vikersund

Senior career*
Years	Team	Apps	(Gls)
–2003	KFUM Oslo		
2003–2006	Lyn	34	(0)
2006	→ Manglerud Star (loan)	16	(0)
2007–2011	KFUM Oslo		
2012	Hønefoss	14	(1)

International career^{‡}
	Norway U21	7	(0)
- * Club domestic league appearances and goals as of 27 September 2012 ‡ National team caps and goals as of 14 November 2010

Christoffer Dahl (born 8 January 1984) is a Norwegian professional footballer who plays as a midfielder for KFUM Oslo. Dahl has played for both Lyn and Hønefoss BK in Tippeligaen.

He also plays futsal for Norwegian Futsal Premier League club KFUM-Kameratene Oslo Futsal.

== Career ==
He started his career in Vikersund before moving to Oslo, and joining KFUM Oslo. He was transferred to Lyn ahead of the 2003 season, where he made his Tippeligaen debut against Viking in a 3–3 draw on 25 May 2003. He was loaned out to Norwegian First Division club Manglerud Star for 16 matches in 2006.

In 2006, he announced that he was retiring from elite football, due to lack of motivation. He decided to start teaching education, and play football for his former club KFUM Oslo, then in the Norwegian Third Division. The team was later promoted to the Second Division.

After playing five seasons for KFUM, he joined the newly promoted Tippeligaen side Hønefoss ahead of the 2012 season. After a half season at the club, he once again decide to step down professional football and rejoined KFUM. He played 14 matches for the club in Tippeligaen, and scored the winning goal in the 16 May match against Rosenborg on Lerkendal Stadion.

== Personal life ==
He is the son of Norwegian priest, Per Arne Dahl, who was nominated as the successor of Oslo bishop, Gunnar Stålsett, but lost to Ole Christian Kvarme.
