= Kvarme =

Kvarme is a Norwegian surname. Notable people with the surname include:

- Bjørn Tore Kvarme (born 1972), Norwegian footballer
- Geir Kvarme (born 1963), Norwegian actor
- Ole Christian Kvarme (born 1948), Norwegian Lutheran bishop
