= Vatnås Church =

Church in Buskerud, Norway

- Vatnås kirke
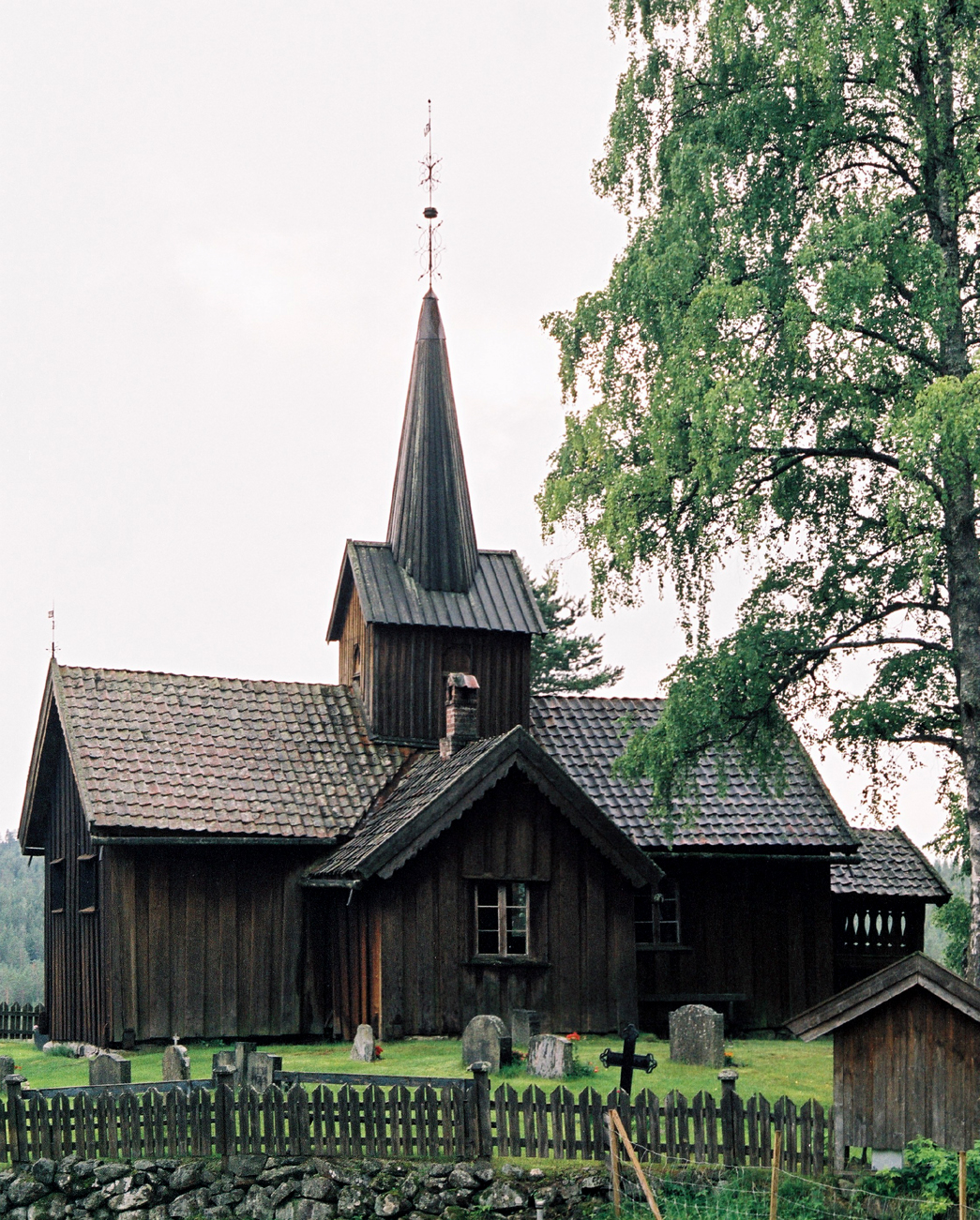
- View of the church
- Vatnås Church
- 59°57′37″N 9°36′53″E
- Location: Sigdal, Buskerud
- Country: Norway
- Denomination: Church of Norway
- Previous denomination: Catholic Church
- Churchmanship: Evangelical Lutheran

History
- Status: Parish church
- Founded: 1660
- Consecrated: 1660

Architecture
- Functional status: Active
- Architectural type: Cruciform
- Completed: 1660 (366 years ago)

Specifications
- Capacity: 125
- Materials: Wood

Administration
- Diocese: Tunsberg
- Deanery: Eiker prosti
- Parish: Sigdal
- Norwegian Cultural Heritage Site
- Type: Church
- Status: Automatically protected
- ID: 85783

Vatnås Church (Norwegian: Vatnås kirke) is a parish church of the Church of Norway in Sigdal Municipality in Buskerud county, Norway. It is located in the village of Vatnås. It is one of the churches for the Sigdal parish which is part of the Eiker prosti (deanery) in the Diocese of Tunsberg. The brown, wooden church was built in a cruciform design in 1660 using plans drawn up by an unknown architect. The church seats about 125 people.

== History ==
The earliest existing historical records of the church date back to the year 1590, but the church was not built that year. The first church in Vatnås was a wooden stave church. The church was likely built in the 13th century, but after the Black Death in Norway, the church was abandoned because there were not enough people in the area to use it. The church then sat empty from about 1350 until the mid-1600s. In 1590, Jens Nilssøn wrote that the church was far from the village in the wild forest and that the church was completely dilapidated and destroyed. In the late 1650s, the old church was torn down and a new church was built in 1660 on the same site.

The new church was a fairly small cruciform church with approximately 125 seats. There is a choir in the east transept with its own entrance in the south. The church is a log building that is clad with external paneling, while the timbers are visible inside the church. The building was renovated in the 1870s. In 1947–1948 the church was renovated again in an attempt to return it to its original condition.

== Media gallery ==
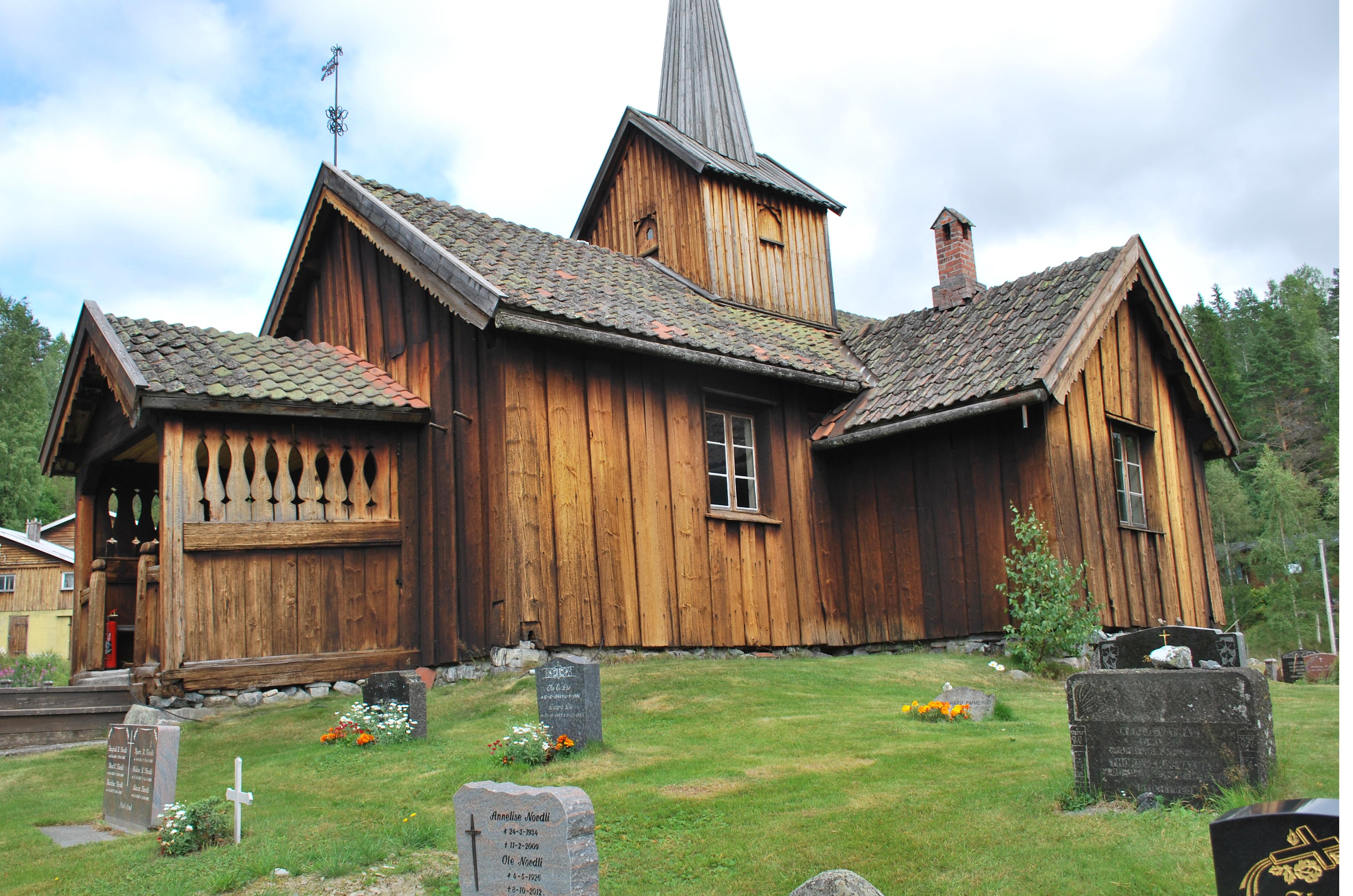

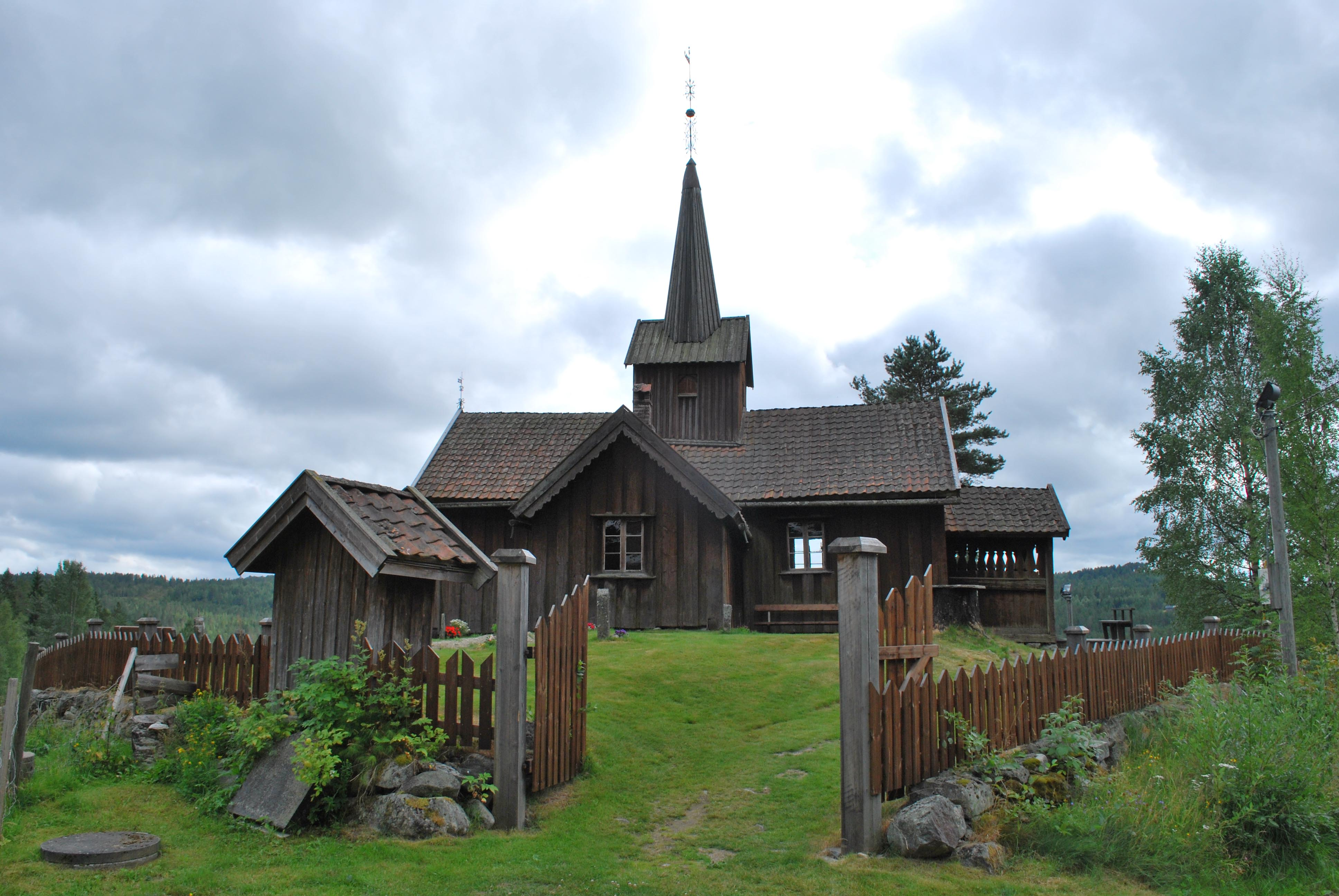

== See also ==
- List of churches in Tunsberg
