= Rasmus Hjort =

Norwegian priest and humanist

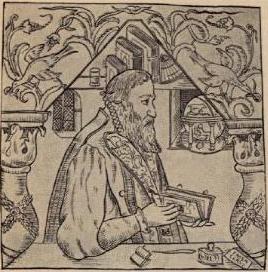
- Born: c. 1525
- Died: 1604
- Occupations: priest and humanist
- Spouse: Gidse Frantsdatter Berg

Rasmus Hjort (c. 1525 – 17 April 1604) was a Norwegian priest and humanist.

Neither his exact birthplace or his parentage are unknown. His training had been associated with Poul Madsen (1527–1590), Bishop of the Diocese of Zealand in Denmark. He worked at the Oslo Cathedral School, where he advanced to rector. From 1562 he served as dean in Tønsberg which Bishop Frants Berg had ceded to him.

He was married to Gidse Frantsdatter Berg, a daughter of Bishop Frants Berg. He is also known for his role as father. In 1613, three of his sons were accused of supporting Roman Catholicism. At that time, strong measures in Denmark and Norway were being made against Catholicism, especially supporters of the Jesuits, due to fear of the Counter-Reformation movement. Two of his sons, Christoffer Hjort, chapel of Akershus Castle and Jacob Hjort, vicar at Onsøy were expelled.
