= Frederik Schmidt =

Norwegian politician (1771–1840)

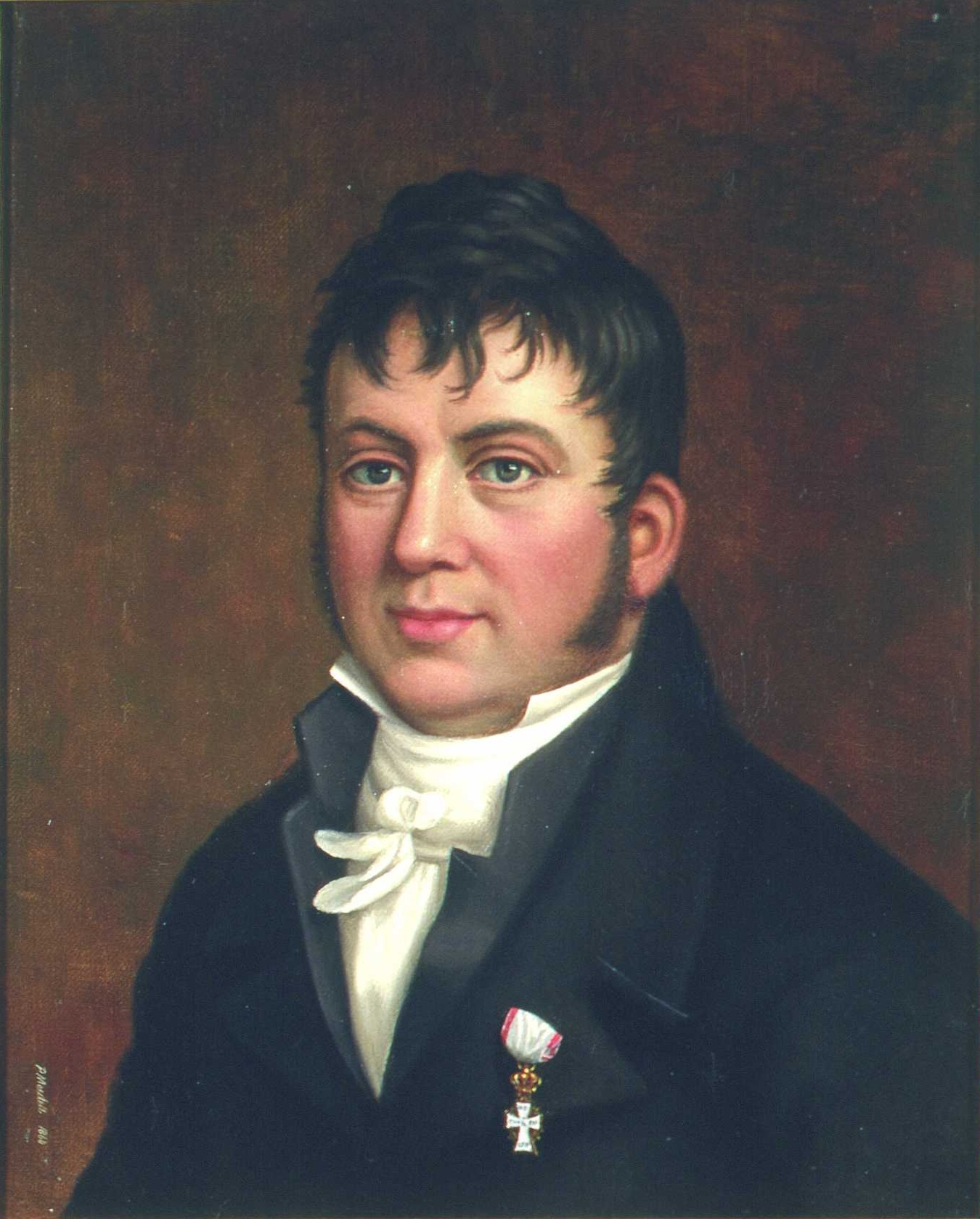
Frederik Schmidt by P. Meidell. The painting belongs to Eidsvoll 1814. From DigitaltMuseum

Frederik Schmidt (27 May 1771 – 16 February 1840) was a Danish-Norwegian priest, politician, doctor of theology, poet and diarist.

== Biography ==
Schmidt was born in Asminderød, Denmark, to Christen Schmidt (1727–1804) and Petronelle S. Lemmich (1734–1798). His parents were of Norwegian descent, and they moved to Norway as his father became bishop in 1773. Schmidt enrolled as a student at the University of Copenhagen in 1787, and after a later hiatus he returned and graduated with the cand.theol. degree in 1791. He was a member of the Norwegian Society.

Schmidt was a priest in Christiania from 1792, and started the periodical Hermoder in 1795, which he edited until 1797. In 1798 he became vicar of Eiker. He was promoted to dean in 1808. He also tried to become dean of Copenhagen, but did not receive the appointment. In 1817 he failed again, in becoming bishop of the Diocese of Bergen. He took an absence of leave of two years, and then resigned from his position in Eiker. In 1820 he returned to Denmark as vicar of Himmelev. He took the dr. theol. degree in 1826 with the thesis Historia Paulicianorum orientalium.

Schmidt was elected to the Norwegian Constituent Assembly in 1814. He supported Crown Prince Christian Frederick of Denmark-Norway and his endeavor to become the new ruler of Norway. When Sweden stopped this plan with a military campaign, Schmidt accepted the subsequent union between Sweden and Norway. However, Schmidt took the initiative to a scrutiny of the Norwegian government's role in the military campaign. This initiative led to Norway's first Impeachment case, against Lieutenant General Fredrik Gottschalk von Haxthausen. Schmidt took this initiative has he had been elected to the first session of the Parliament of Norway, representing the constituency of Buskeruds Amt. He only served one term. After 1814, Schmidt moved back to his birth country of Denmark in resentment over the union with Sweden, but probably also in frustration that he did not become the Bishop of Bergen. He was also one of the co-founders of the Royal Norwegian Society of Development (Det Kongelige Selskap for Norges Velin) 1809. In 1813 he was appointed a Knight of the Order of the Dannebrog.

Frederik Schmidt died in February 1840 in Himmelev, Denmark.

== Family and personal life ==
Schmidt married Maren Elisabeth Mathea Oppen (1778–1841) in January 1799 in Christiania.

Schmidt wrote poems, and releases include Samlede Digte (1811) and Ny samlede Digte (1835). He is also known for his diaries. Diaries for the years 1790, 1794, 1807, 1811, 1814, 1817, 1818 and 1819 have been preserved by the Royal Danish Library in Copenhagen. Excerpts from diaries were released in 1868 as Provst Fredrik Schmidts Dagbøger. A new edition came, in three volumes, between 1966 and 1985. These diaries are regarded as having significant historical value.
