= Hans Rosing =

Norwegian clergyman

Bishop Hans Rosing
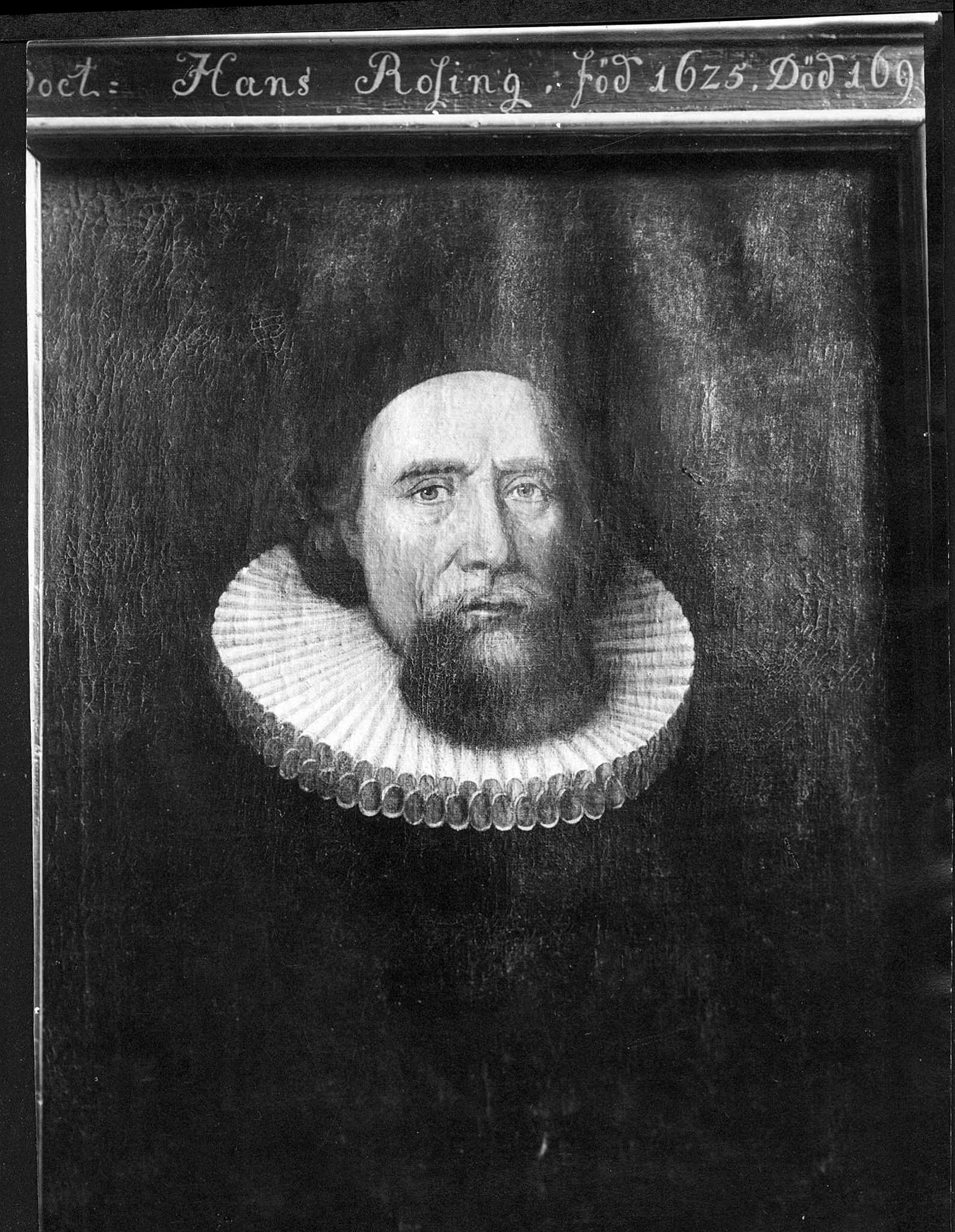

Personal details
- Born: 9 August 1625 Brønnøy in Nordland, Norway
- Died: 13 April 1699 (aged 73) Oslo, Norway
- Denomination: Lutheran
- Parents: Claus Rasmussen Rosing and Birgitte Schanche
- Occupation: Priest
- Education: University of Copenhagen

Hans Rosing (9 August 1625 – 13 April 1699) was a Norwegian clergyman. He served as Bishop of the Diocese of Oslo from 1664 until 1699.

== Biography ==
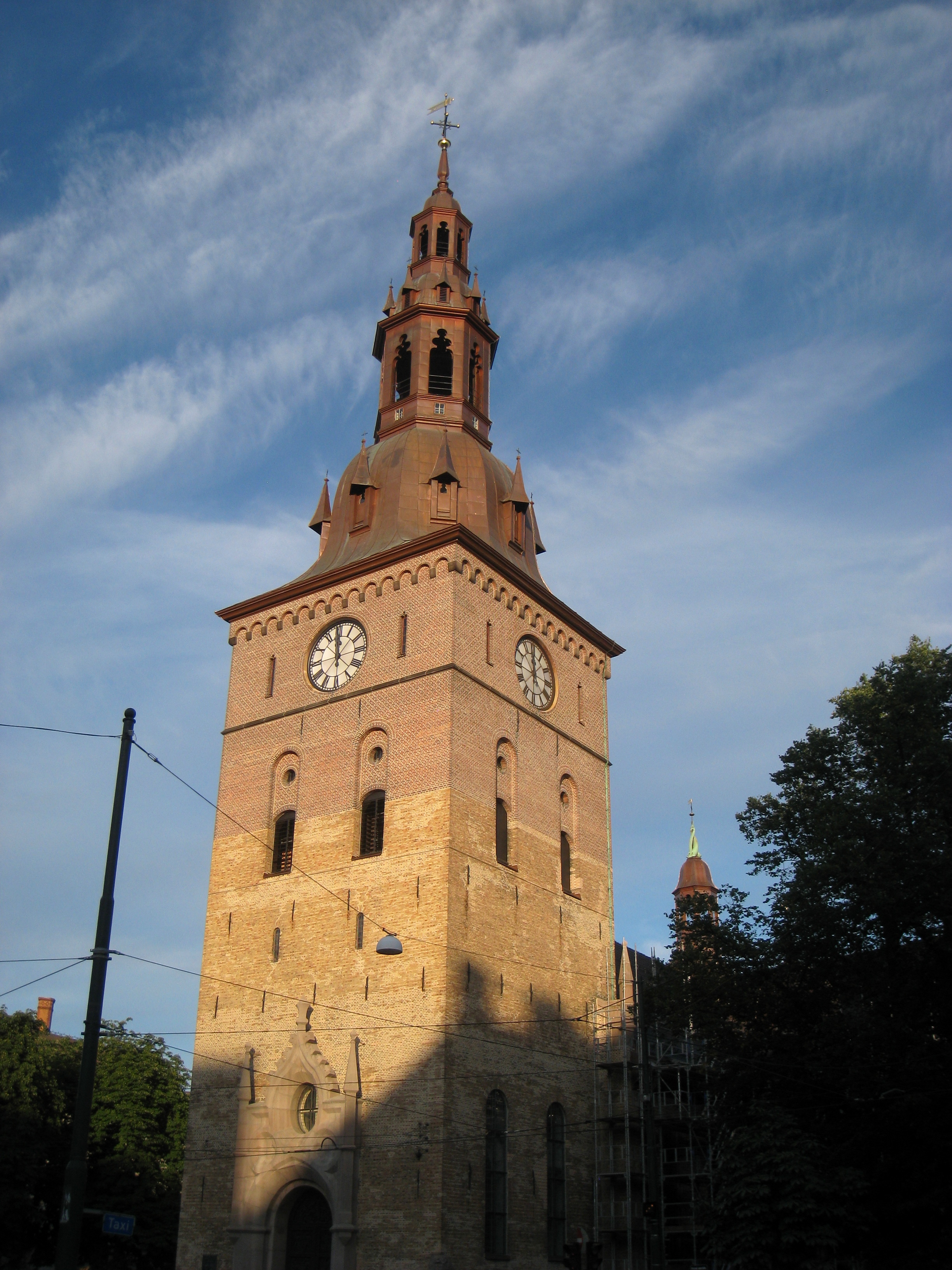
Oslo Cathedral

He was born at Brønnøy in Nordland county, Norway. He was the son of Claus Rasmussen Rosing (ca. 1602-1644) and Birgitte Christensdatter Schanche (1603-1681). Both his father and grandfather were priests. He attended Trondheim Cathedral School. From 1645 he went at the University of Copenhagen. From 1649 he had the opportunity to study abroad and was enrolled at the universities of Leiden, Leipzig and Orléans.

From 1652 he started as vicar at Tureby on Zealand and shortly after he married Gertrud Hansdatter Borchardsen (1636-1660), daughter of Hans Borchardsen (1597-1643), Bishop of Ribe. He was transferred to Kalundborg in 1660. He served as Bishop of the Diocese of Oslo (Akershus stift) from 1664 until his death in 1699.

As bishop, he encouraged improved clerical training. He also collaborated closely with Viceroy (Statholder) Ulrik Frederik Gyldenløve (1638–1704) who was Governor-general of Norway. Additionally he arranged for the construction of Vår Frelsers kirke (now Oslo Cathedral). The foundation was laid in 1694 and the church was consecrated in November 1697.

Rosing was married twice; 1st with Gertrud Hansdatter Borchardsen (1636-1660), 2nd with Kirsten Bang (ca. 1635-1699).

Church of Norway titles
Preceded by Henning Stockfleth	Bishop of Christiania; 1664–1699	Succeeded by Hans Munch
