= Bartholomæus Deichman =

Danish-Norwegian clergyman

Right Reverend Doctor Bartholomæus Deichman
- Bishop
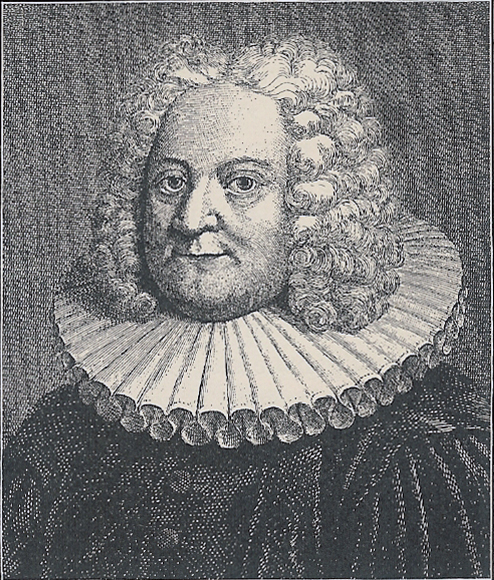
- Church: Church of Norway
- Diocese: Christiania (1699–1712)
- Predecessor: Hans Munch
- Successor: Peder Hersleb

Personal details
- Born: 5 February 1671 Copenhagen, Denmark
- Died: 16 April 1731 (aged 60) Christiania, Norway
- Denomination: Lutheranism
- Occupation: Priest

Bartholomæus Deichman (5 February 1671 – 16 April 1731) was a Danish-Norwegian clergyman, predominantly within the Church of Norway. He was bishop of Bishop of Viborg from 1700 and Bishop of the Diocese of Christiania from 1712 to 1730.

As the Bishop of Christiania (now Oslo), Deichman was involved in the Norwegian church sale of the 1720s. Because of his close relationship with Frederick IV of Denmark, Deichman's power in Norway rivaled that of the Governor-General and made him one of the most powerful officials in Norway until his abrupt dismissal by Christian VI in 1730.

== Early life and education ==
Bartholomæus Deichman was born on 5 February 1671 in Copenhagen. His father, Peder Deichman (ca. 1639–1684), was a wine merchant and town clerk. His mother, Else Pedersdatter (d. ca. 1675), died when he was a child. His father remarried in 1677.

Deichman matriculated at the University of Copenhagen in 1688, and was awarded his Baccalaureate mere months later. After taking the theological exam in 1690, he studied in Frankfurt, Leiden, and Utrecht. Although he considered pursuing medicine, he was convinced by the Bishop of Zealand, Hans Bagger, to continue studying theology.

== Career ==
In 1693 he was ordained and began serving as chaplain to the Danish auxiliary troops. The troops had been leased to the King of England to serve in the Nine Years' War. Deichman served as their chaplain for three years. In 1696, he left the military to accompany Prince Charles of Denmark as his personal priest and confessor on his trip to France and Italy, which lasted until 1699.

Deichman had already secured a position in clergy, and on his return to Denmark was made parish priest in Kolding. He delivered his first sermon in Kolding on Whitsun in 1699. He did not remain there long and almost immediately thereafter left for Odense where he was made the diocesan deacon. Having abruptly risen through the ranks of the Church of Denmark, he was meant to have achieved his doctorate in theology before being made Bishop, but did not have time to do so before being made Bishop of Viborg on 12 June 1700. On 10 September 1712, Deichman was appointed Bishop of Christiania. He would remain in Christiania for the rest of his life.

Having formerly been Prince Charles' priest, Deichman had close connections with the Danish court. Because of this connection, it is suspected that Deichman was later involved in Frederick IV's bigamous marriage to Anne Sophie Reventlow in 1712. There is no evidence that he supported their marriage, but was undeniably favored by the King after the face. Over time, he became a close advisor to the king on Norwegian affairs, much to the frustration of the Governor-General of Norway, Johan Vibe. His power was vocally opposed by Vibe, alongside Frederik Rostgaard and Admiral Christian Gabel. After his efforts to create a new land register were blocked, he arranged a commission to investigate the officials that had opposed him in 1724. Under false pretenses, he accused his opponents of taking bribes, while simultaneously spreading rumors about them. His efforts saw both Rostgaard and Gabel fall out of favor.

When Frederick IV died in 1730, Deichman was immediately removed from his position as Bishop by the newly-crowned Christian VI. Deichman was accused of having abused his office and an investigation was launched. The investigation did not find him guilty of any specific crimes, but was not completed by the time that he died in 1731.

== Personal life ==
In 1699, he married Else Rosemeyer (ca. 1669–1745), daughter of Carl Rosemeyer (d. 1670) and his wife Anna Pedersdatter (d. 1679). They had six children: three sons and three daughters. Their son, Carl Deichman (1705–1780), was an investor in Fossum Ironworks and later owner of Eidsfos Verk. Their daughter, Margrethe Deichman (1708–1759), was married to Chancellor Herman Løvenskiold (1701–1759), a member of the noble Løvenskiold noble family who owned Borgestad Manor in Gjerpen.

Deichman died on 16 April 1731 in Christiania. He was buried at Oslo Cathedral. During his life, he collected a sizeable library with over 15,000 volumes, which was sold at auction in 1732. He had started collecting books while traveling with Prince Charles in the 1690s.

Church of Norway titles
Preceded by Hans Munch	Bishop of Oslo; 1712– 1730	Succeeded by Peder Hersleb
