= Anders Bendssøn Dall =

Danish Lutheran prelate (1550-1607)

The Right Reverend Anders Bendssøn Dall
- Bishop of Oslo
- Diocese: Oslo
- Installed: 1601
- Term ended: 18 April 1607
- Predecessor: Jens Nilssøn
- Successor: Niels Claussøn Senning

Personal details
- Born: 1550 Denmark, Denmark–Norway
- Died: 18 April 1607 (aged 56–57) Oslo, Norway, Denmark–Norway
- Spouse: Anne Pedersdatter
- Education: University of Copenhagen (Mag.art)

Anders Bendssøn Dall (Latinized as Andreas Benedictus Dallinus) was a Danish Lutheran prelate of the Church of Norway who served as Bishop of Oslo from 1601 to 1607. He played an important role in proposing a new church ordinance for the Norwegian Church to have more autonomy from the Church of Denmark.

== Early life and education ==
Dall was born in Denmark around 1550; his parents' names are unknown. After entering the priesthood, he studied at the University of Copenhagen and other foreign universities. In 1591, after several years as a parish priest, Dall returned to the University of Copenhagen, receiving his magister degree.

== Priesthood ==
Dall began his priestly career in the early 1580s in Denmark, first as the parish priest in Eltang and Vilstrup, before becoming pastor in Kolding in 1586. During his time in Kolding, he authored a large manuscript entitled Theologia Davidica, and a book of sermons on the Books of Psalms. In 1590, he became vicar of the Church of the Holy Ghost in Copenhagen. In 1591, after being awarded his magister degree, he was appointed court preacher of Christian IV, King of Denmark and Norway. He accompanied the king on his trip to Norway in 1598. During the 1590s, Dall published several translations of theological writings, and also translated an account of Christian IV's coronation.

== Episcopacy ==
Dall was appointed Bishop of Oslo in Spring 1600, and was installed in 1601. As bishop, he worked to clarify church canons and issues involving church finances. It is believed that he was also the most prominent figure in proposing a separate church ordinance that would give the Church of Norway independence from the Church of Denmark. On 2 January 1604, Dall and three other Norwegian bishops gathered to discuss the proposal, and Dall personally met with King Christian IV to represent the Norwegian Church. Dall led negotiations in Bergen between 22 April and 19 May 1604, and a draft of a new ordinance became the basis of the proposal that was presented to the king that same year. Dall and the other bishops, in authoring the ordinance, had considered some new theological positions, including a controversial understanding of baptism, and stricter church discipline with more power centered with the bishops. Church historian Tarald Rasmussen described Dall's theological views as an example of "early absolutist ecclesiology." Ultimately, the ordinance presented to the king was rejected. A new, more moderate document was authored in Copenhagen by the Church's chancery in consultation with university professors. The new draft was approved by the king in 1607.

Besides his proposal for the new church ordinance, not much is known about Dall's time as bishop. It is known that he served as a canon judge at the Lund Cathedral in Sweden for some time. In addition, he was involved in disputes over property lines in Aker in 1602 and again in 1606. He also advanced a plan to improve the Oslo school system by imposing a new tax on all commercial farms, but the proposal was never implemented. Dall died in office on 18 April 1607, in his mid-50s.

== Personal life ==
Dall was married to Anne Pedersdatter, who died in 1626. In 1603, he and his wife donated a silver chalice to St. Hallvard's Cathedral. The cathedral has since fallen into ruin, and the chalice was transferred to the Oslo Cathedral.
