= Frederik Julius Bech =

Danish-Norwegian theologian and politician

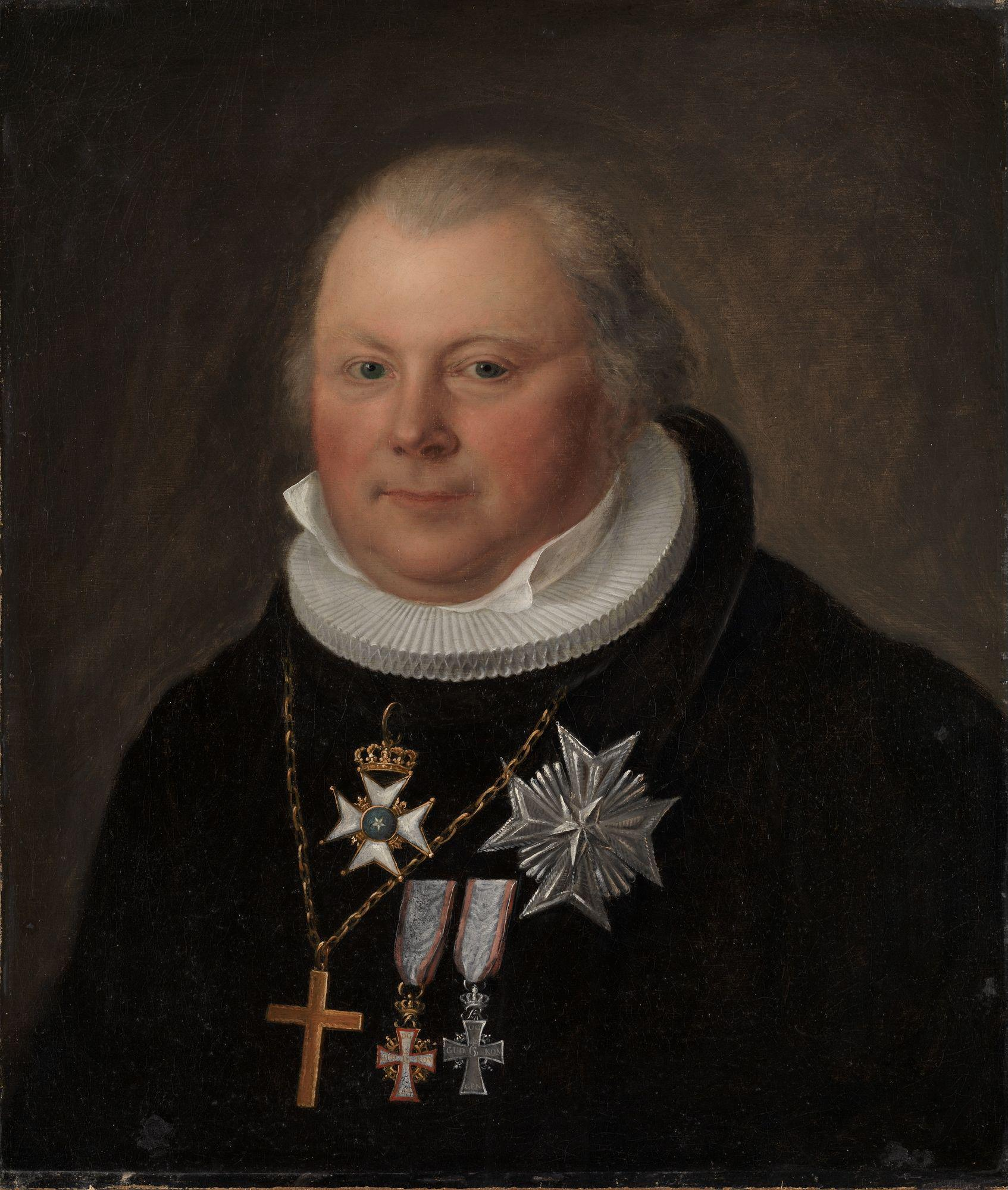
- Church: Church of Norway
- Diocese: Diocese of Oslo
- Elected: 1805
- Predecessor: Christen Schmidt
- Successor: Christian Sørenssen

Personal details
- Born: August 4, 1758 Middelfart, Denmark-Norway
- Died: December 20, 1822 (aged 64) Kristiania, Sweden-Norway
- Parents: Thomas Jensen Beck, Else Margrethe Hansdatter From
- Spouse: Charlotte Cathrina Outber
- Occupation: Theologian, politician
- Education: Cand.theol.

Frederik Julius Bech (August 4, 1758 – December 20, 1822) was a Danish-Norwegian theologian and politician. He took part in the Meeting of Notables in Eidsvoll on February 16, 1814, and he served as the bishop of the Diocese of Oslo from 1805 to 1822. As the head of the Church of Norway, he crowned Charles III John of Norway at Nidaros Cathedral in 1818.

Bech was born in Middelfart on the Danish island of Funen. He received his theology degree (cand.theol.) in 1783, and then traveled to Trondheim to work as a tutor for the Krogh family. He later worked as a teacher at the civil high school in Trondheim, and at the same time had religious oversight of the hospital and prison. In 1794 he became the parish priest at Ørland Church, in 1798 the resident curate at Nidaros Cathedral, and in 1803 the parish priest in Skogn. In 1804 he was appointed to the Odense diocese, Denmark. The same year he was also awarded a doctorate in theology from the University of Kiel for a minor thesis on Jesus' miracles. However, he returned to Norway because in 1805 he was appointed bishop of the Akershus diocese. This corresponded to today's dioceses of Oslo, Hamar, and Tunsberg, as well as Telemark.

Frederik Julius Bech has been regarded as a typical Enlightenment-inspired theologian. Despite holding a doctorate in theology, he was not a great theologian or scientist, but he was enthusiastic about schooling and public education. He authored a number of works on pedagogy, including En dydig Opdragelse, betragtet som Grunden til Staters sande Vel (A Virtuous Upbringing, Considered the Reason for the True Good of States, 1786) and Er det ligegyldigt hvorledes de ringere Stænder opdrage sine Børn? (Does It Make No Difference How the Poor Raise Their Children? 1787). His work Veiledning til at opdrage en sund, fornuftig, duelig og lykkelig Afkom (Manual on How to Raise Healthy, Reasonable, Sound, and Happy Children, 1792) was the first guide to sexual education in Denmark–Norway. As the parish priest in Ørland, Bech doubled the number of teachers there, and he also established a school for teacher education in Trondheim. He was also one of the founders of the Norwegian Society for Development. The 1915 edition of the Danish encyclopedia Salmonsens Konversationsleksikon describes him as follows: "He was administratively skilled and proficient. Already in Trondheim he improved the school system, increased the teachers' education and pay, made arrangements for the poor in a exemplary manner fitting the circumstances, and set in motion several charitable arrangements with feasible organization."

Bech was distinctly rationalist, and had a negative opinion of Hans Nielsen Hauge and the Haugean movement. He published a text against Hauge's activities in 1802, Raad og Advarsel imod Sværmerie og dets bedrøvelige Virkninger (Advice and Warning against Fanaticism and Its Deplorable Effects), and in 1806 he also sent a circular to the priests in the Akershus diocese on how Haugeanism could be fought. He was, however, opposed to using police force against the Haugeans, and he typically believed that the movement could best be countered by increased public education.

Bech wanted to play an active role in politics, but he was not consistent in his positions. In 1814 he was initially loyal to Frederick VI and then to Christian Frederick, and together with Carsten Anker he supported the monarchy at the Meeting of Notables at Eidsvoll. At the Norwegian Constituent Assembly, together with the bishop of the Diocese of Nidaros, Peder Olivarius Bugge, and state secretary Mathias Sommerhielm, he participated in a committee independent of the Constituent Assembly that reviewed the representatives' addresses and authorizations. In the fall of the same year, he was described as "the Union's and the Swedes' voluble attorney at the extraordinary parliament and Carl John's apparent fervent admirer" (Unionens og Svenskernes frasefyldte Advokat paa det overordentlige Storting og Karl Johan’s tilsyneladende varme Beundrer). Christian Frederick is reported to have said about him that "Han skifter Mening, som man skifter Linned" (He changes his mind like one changes underwear).

Bech was the first vice-chancellor of the University of Oslo, and also led the Education Committee (Oplysningscomitéen), the first independent administrative body for cultural affairs. In 1814, the committee was replaced by the Ministry of Church and Education. Bech was also one of the founders of the Norwegian Bible Society in 1816, and was the society's chairman until his death.

In 1815, Bech received the Grand Cross of the Order of the Polar Star.

King Charles XIV John of Sweden apparently forgave Bech's former political vacillation, and in 1818 Bech, as the head of the Church of Norway, crowned him as Charles III John of Norway in Nidaros Cathedral.
