= Carl Peter Parelius Essendrop =

Norwegian politician, clergyman, and educator (1818–1893)

The Right Reverend Carl Peter Parelius Essendrop
- Bishop of Oslo
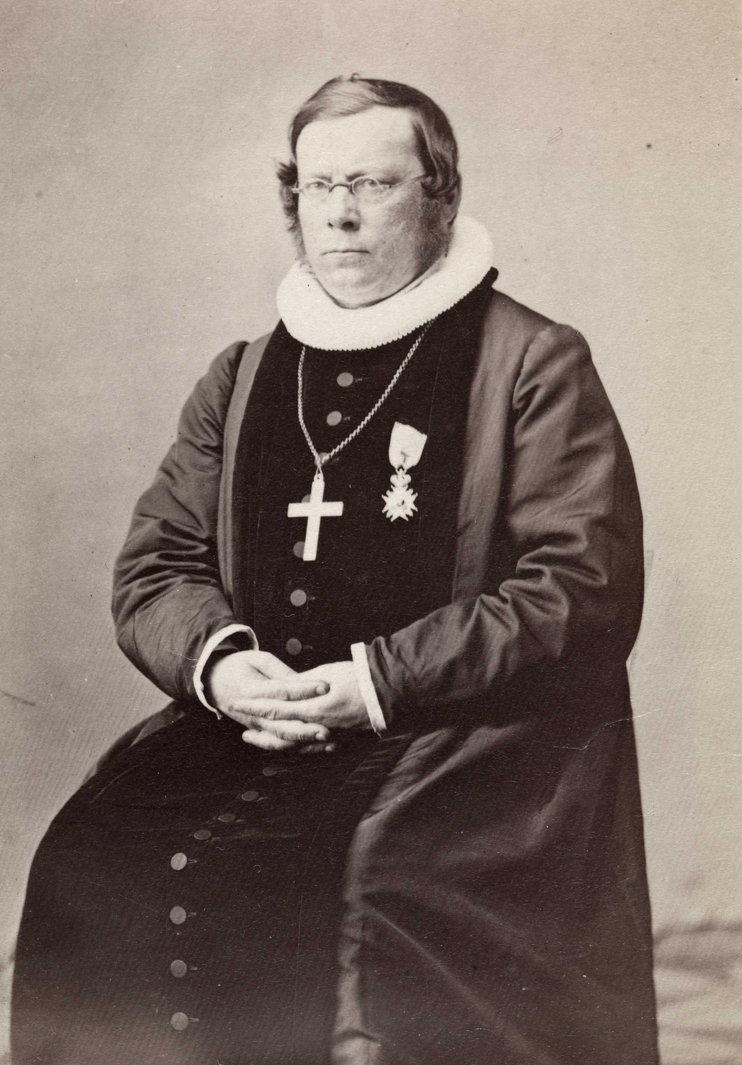
- Carl Peter Parelius Essendrop, ca. 1870
- Church: Church of Norway
- Diocese: Tromsø (1861–1867); Kristiania (1875–1893)
- Other post: Norwegian Minister of Church and Education

Personal details
- Born: 6 June 1818 Kristiania, Denmark–Norway
- Died: 18 October 1893 (aged 75) Kristiania, Norway
- Denomination: Lutheran
- Spouse: Karen Ursula Fabritius (1819-1889).
- Education: Cand.theol. (1839)

Carl Peter Parelius Essendrop (6 June 1818 – 18 October 1893) was a Norwegian Lutheran priest, educator and Bishop of Oslo.

== Biography ==
Essendrop was born in Christiania (now Oslo), Norway. He was the son of Peter Essendrop (1776-1819) and Martha Marie Søborg (1784-1861). His brother was Bernhard Ludvig Essendrop. He became cand.theol. in 1839.

From 1842 on, he was a teaching assistant at Trondheim Cathedral School. In 1849 he became priest in Klæbu Municipality in Søndre Trondhjem county. Essendrop was the bishop of the Diocese of Tromsø from 1861 to 1867. From 1867 to 1872 he was the vicar of the Diocese of Kristiania, and also lectured at the Royal Frederick University. From 1 July 1872 to 23 November 1874 he was the Minister of Church and Education. He later filled in as acting Minister from 26 May to 4 June and 6 July to 20 July 1875. From 1875 to his death, he was the Bishop of the Diocese of Kristiania.

During the term 1877–1879 he was a deputy member of the Norwegian Parliament, representing the constituency Kristiania, Hønefos og Kongsvinger.

He was married to Karen Ursula Fabritius (1819-1889). Essendrop died at Kristiania and was buried at Vår Frelsers gravlund.

Church of Norway titles
Preceded by Knud Gislesen	Bishop of Tromsø; 1861–1867	Succeeded by Waldemar Hvoslef
Preceded by Jens Lauritz Arup	Bishop of Kristiania; 1875–1893	Succeeded by Fredrik Bugge
Unknown	Preses of the Church of Norway; 1877	Succeeded by Jens Frølich Tandberg
Political offices
Preceded by Hans Riddervold	Norwegian Minister of Church and Education; 1872–1874	Succeeded by Rasmus Tønder Nissen
Preceded by Rasmus Tønder Nissen	Norwegian Minister of Church and Education (acting); 1875–1875	Succeeded by Rasmus Tønder Nissen
Preceded by Rasmus Tønder Nissen	Norwegian Minister of Church and Education (acting); 1875–1875	Succeeded by Rasmus Tønder Nissen
