= Hans Munch (bishop) =

Danish-Norwegian theologian and priest

Right Reverend Doctor Hans Munch
- Bishop
- Church: Church of Norway
- Diocese: Christianssand (1694–1699); Christiania (1699–1712)

Personal details
- Born: 5 June 1654 Torkilstrup, Denmark
- Died: 24 June 1712 (aged 58) Christiania, Norway
- Denomination: Christian
- Occupation: Priest
- Education: Dr.Theol.

Hans Munch was a Danish-Norwegian theologian and priest. He served as a bishop of the Diocese of Christianssand from 1694 until 1699 and of the Diocese of Christiania from 1699 until his death in 1712.

== Personal life ==
Hans Nielsen Munch was born on 5 June 1654 in the village of Torkildstrup on the island of Falster in southeastern Denmark. His parents were Niels Munch and Karen Sadolin. He married Anna Aagaard, the cousin to the King's mistress, Sophie Amalie Moth.

== Education and career ==
He was educated in Helsingør, graduating in 1672. He received a magister's degree in 1677. In 1680, he was hired as a parish priest in Kalundborg. In 1686, he was called to be the dean in Christiania. In 1694, he was appointed to be the Bishop of the Diocese of Christianssand. He accepted the position, but he also received a royal promise that when the bishop's seat in Christiania became vacant, he would get to transfer there. In 1699, that seat became vacant upon the death of Hans Rosing, and Munch was transferred there to serve as the Bishop of the Diocese of Christiania. He was present for the coronation of the new King Frederik IV in 1700. The same year, he received his doctor of theology degree. During his time as a bishop, he maintained his duties, but did not excel. In 1704, the King came to Christiania and he gave a sermon for the King, but it was characterized as a sermon of a country citizen, but not of a bishop. The only time he showed real zeal as a bishop was one time when he expelled a Quaker priest from London who had been traveling through the diocese preaching. He served there until his death on 24 June 1712.

Church of Norway titles
Preceded by Jacob Jensen Jersin	Bishop of Christianssand; 1694–1699	Succeeded by Ludvig Stoud
Preceded by Hans Rosing	Bishop of Christiania; 1699–1712	Succeeded by Bartholomæus Deichman
