= Jens Frølich Tandberg =

Norwegian bishop (1852–1922)

The Right Reverend Jens Frølich Tandberg
- Bishop of Oslo; Primate of the church of Norway
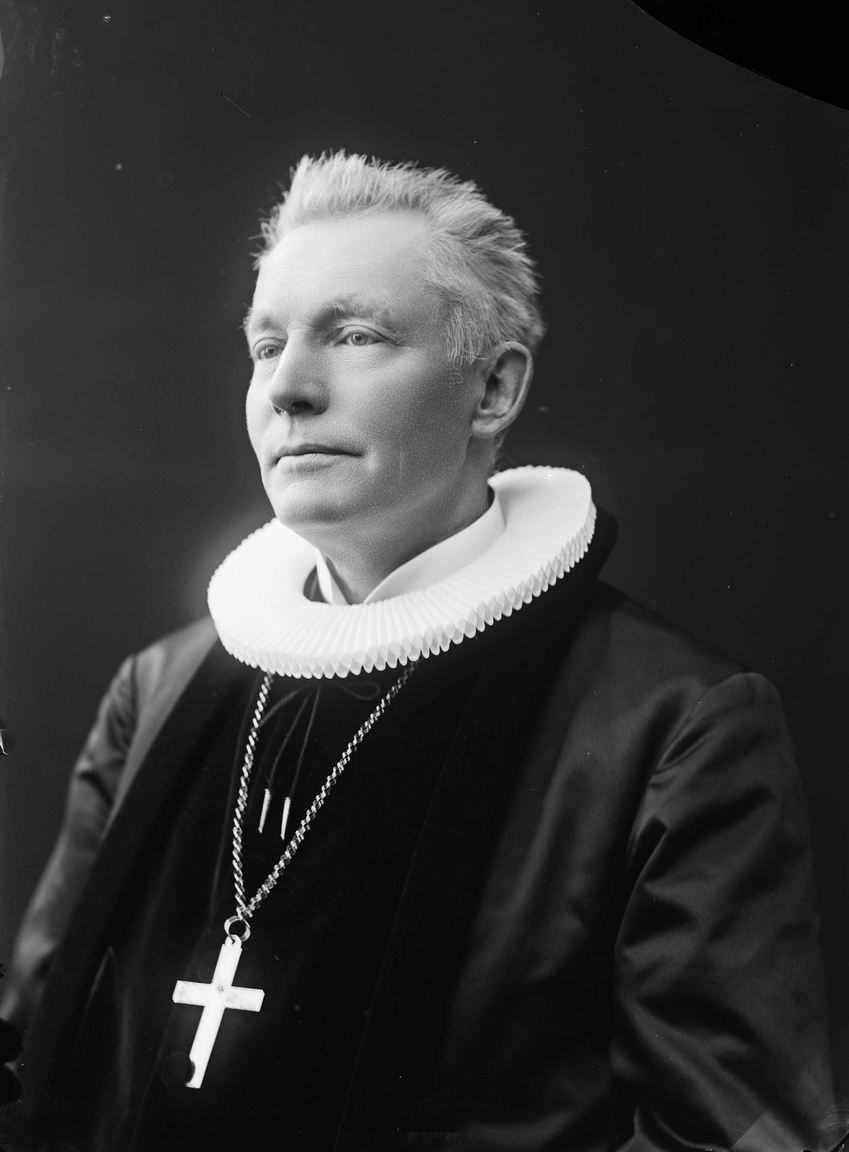
- Church: Church of Norway
- In office: 1912–1922
- Predecessor: Anton Christian Bang
- Successor: Johan P. Lunde

Personal details
- Born: May 13, 1852 Hausvik, Norway
- Died: March 21, 1922 (aged 69) Christiania

Jens Frølich Tandberg (May 13, 1852 – March 21, 1922) was the bishop of Oslo from 1912 to 1922.

Tandberg was born in Hausvik, Norway. He was the son of Jørgen Tandberg, who served as the bishop of the Diocese of Kristiansand from 1882 to 1884.

Tandberg received his theology degree (cand.theol.) in 1875. He served in various church positions, including catechist in Porsgrunn from 1883 to 1886, parish priest in Røyken from 1898 to 1903, vicar at Saint Peter's Church (now Sofienberg Church) from 1903 to 1911, and dean and later bishop of Christiania (now Oslo).

Tandberg was considered moderately conservative. He headed the Norwegian School of Theology's governing board and stood on the conservative side in the church struggle between liberals and the so-called positive theologians in the early 1900s. As the bishop of Oslo, he adopted a firmer attitude, and in 1919 he took the initiative to hold a church gathering to settle the controversy. Tandberg was sharply attacked by Ole Hallesby, a professor at the school, who accused him of being liberal. This created the background for the large meeting held at the Calmeyer Street Mission House (Calmeyergatens Misjonshus) in 1920, where the conservative (i.e., positive) side consolidated around a position known as the Calmeyer Street Policy (Calmeyergatelinjen). It held that conservative laity and clergy should not have any kind of relations with liberal theologians. In parishes with a liberal priest, the laity were called upon to boycott the priest, and in Hallesby's view they had the right to form their own independent churches.

Tandberg took part in the work to prepare Landstad's Revised Hymnal.

Church of Norway titles
Preceded by Anton Christian Bang	Bishop of Oslo; 1912–1922	Succeeded by Johan Lunde
Preceded by Carl Peter Parelius Essendrop	Preses of the Church of Norway; 1915, 1917-1922	Succeeded by Johan Lunde
