= Hans Rev =

Danish-Norwegian clergyman

The Right Reverend Hans Rev
- Bishop of Oslo
- Church: Church of Norway (prev. Roman Catholic)
- Diocese: Oslo
- Elected: 1525 (Bishop of Oslo); 1541 (Superintendent of Oslo)
- In office: 1525–1537; 1541–1545
- Successor: Anders Madssøn

Orders
- Consecration: 1525 by Olav Engelbrektsson

Personal details
- Born: c.1489 Denmark
- Died: July/August 1545 Oslo, Norway
- Denomination: Lutheran

Hans Rev or Hans Reff (about 1489 in Denmark – July/August 1545 in Oslo) was a Danish-Norwegian clergyman. He was the last Bishop of the Roman Catholic Diocese of Oslo before the Protestant Reformation, and later became the first Lutheran Superintendent of the Diocese of Oslo within the Church of Norway.

About Rev's background, little is known except that he was of Danish origin. He studied in Paris, where he earned his master's degree in both Roman and Canon Law. He worked for some years as secretary for Archbishop Erik Valkendorf, who was elected Archbishop of Nidaros in 1510. In 1525, Rev has been appointed Bishop of Oslo with the support of Archbishop Olav Engelbrektsson and King Frederick I of Denmark.

During the invasion of Norway by the former king Christian II (1531–1532). Hans Rev supported Christian, but changed sides back to Frederick when Christian's invasion forces were defeated. He remained lojal to Frederick until his death in 1533, and after that he supported the late kings Protestant son, Prince Christian.

In August 1536 after the Count's Feud in Denmark and during Archbishop Olav Engelbrektsson rebellion in Norway, Rev, along with the other Roman Catholic bishops of Denmark and Norway, was declared deposed by now King Christian III. After the rebellion in Norway was crushed. Rev renounced In November 1537, his episcopal dignity in a letter to the King and promised his continued loyalty and allegiance. In the fall of 1541, he was appointed Bishop (ecclesiastical title Superintendent) of the Diocese of Oslo, which was simultaneously incorporated with the Diocese of Hamar. He thus became the Oslo's first Lutheran bishop. He was also the only former Roman Catholic bishop to lead a Diocese within the Church of Norway. He served as Superintendent until his death in 1545. He was replaced by Anders Madssøn who served in this capacity from 1545–1548.

== Other sources ==
- Ellingsen, Terje (1997) Reformasjonen i Norge. Da kirken valgte kurs (Kristiansand: Høyskoleforlaget) ISBN 8276340938
