= Niels Dorph =

Danish/Norwegian clergyman

- Born: 1681
- Died: 1758 (aged 76–77)
- Occupations: Clergyman, Bishop of the Diocese of Oslo

Niels Dorph (1681–1758) was a Danish/Norwegian clergyman. He served as Bishop of the Diocese of Oslo from 1738 to 1758.

Church of Norway titles
Preceded by Peder Hersleb	Bishop of Oslo; 1738–1758	Succeeded by Fredrik Nannestad
