= Diocese of Oslo =

Church of Norway diocese

Diocese of Oslo Oslo bispedømme
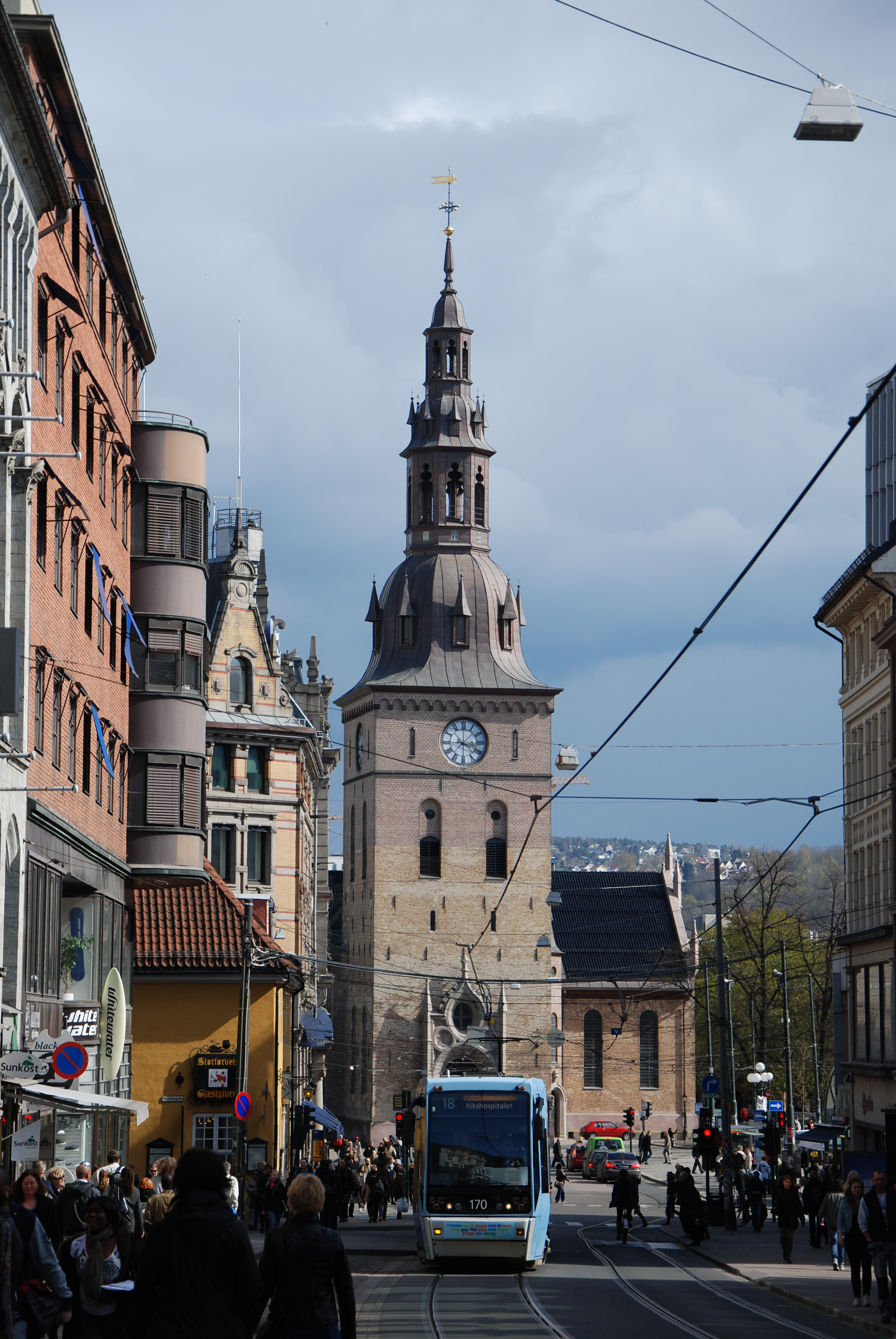
- Oslo Cathedral

Location
- Country: Norway
- Territory: Oslo; Asker; Bærum
- Deaneries: 7

Statistics
- Parishes: 55
- Members: 454,924

Information
- Denomination: Church of Norway
- Established: 1168
- Cathedral: Oslo Cathedral

Current leadership
- Bishop: Sunniva Gylver
- Bishops emeritus: Ole Christian Kvarme (2005-2017); Gunnar Stålsett (1998-2005); Andreas Aarflot (1977-1998)

Map
- Location of the diocese

Website
- Website of the Diocese

The Diocese of Oslo is the Church of Norway's bishopric for the municipalities of Oslo, Asker and Bærum. It is one of Norway's five traditional bishoprics and was founded around the year 1070.

== History ==
Oslo was established as a diocese in 1068. It was originally a suffragan of the archdiocese of Hamburg-Bremen, from 1104 on of that of Lund and starting from 1152 on of Nidaros. It then covered the (modern) counties of Oslo, Akershus, Buskerud (except Hallingdal), Hedmark (except the northern part of Østerdalen), Oppland (except Valdres), Telemark, Vestfold and Østfold, and the province of Bohuslän, and the parishes of Idre and Särna.

The Diocese of Hamar was established and separated from Oslo in 1152, but it was again merged with Oslo in 1541 (together with the northern part of Østerdalen from Diocese of Nidaros). The regions of Hallingdal and Valdres were transferred from Diocese of Stavanger to Oslo in 1631. (But Oslo had to give the upper part of Telemark to Stavanger in return.) The parishes of Idre and Särna were lost to Sweden in 1644, and the province of Bohuslän was lost in 1658. Hamar (with Hedmark and Oppland) was again separated from Oslo in 1864. The rest of Telemark was transferred to Diocese of Kristiansand (see Diocese of Agder og Telemark) the same year. The Diocese of Tunsberg (with Vestfold and Buskerud) was established and separated from Oslo in 1948. The Diocese of Borg (with Akershus and Østfold) was established and separated from Oslo in 1969.

Today the Diocese of Oslo only covers the county of Oslo and the municipalities of Asker and Bærum in Akershus.

== Bishops ==
=== Medieval ===
- c. 1050 – c. 1075 Asgaut, missionary bishop
- Torolv
- Aslak
- Geisard
- fl. 1122–1133 Kol Torkelson
- Peter
- ? – 1157 William
- 1157/61–1170 Torsteinn
- 1170–1190 Helge I
- 1190–1225 Nikolas Arnesson
- 1226–1244 Orm
- 1247–1248 Torkell
- 1248–1267 Håkon
- 1267–1287 Andres
- 1288–1303 Eyvind
- 1304–1322 Helge II
- 1322–1351 Salomon Toraldson
- 1352–1354 Gyrd Aslason
- 1352–1358 Sigfrid of Stavagner
- 1359–1370 Hallvard Bjørnarsson
- 1373–1385 Jon
- 1386–1407 Eystein Aslaksson
- 1407 Aslak Bolt
- 1408–1420 Jakob Knutson
- 1420–1452 Jens Jakobssøn
- 1453–1483 Gunnar Tjostulvsson Holk
- 1483–1488 Nils Audensson Kalib
- 1489–1505 Herlog Vigleiksson Korning
- 1506–1521 Anders Mus
- 1521–1524 Hans Mule
- 1524 Anders Mus
- 1525-1537 Hans Rev

=== Since the Reformation ===
- 1541–1545 Hans Rev
- 1545–1548 Anders Madssøn
- 1548–1580 Frants Berg
- 1580–1600 Jens Nilssøn
- 1601–1607 Anders Bendssøn Dall
- 1607–1617 Niels Claussøn Senning
- 1617–1639 Niels Simonsen Glostrup
- 1639–1646 Oluf Boesen
- 1646–1664 Henning Stockfleth
- 1664–1699 Hans Rosing
- 1699–1712 Hans Munch
- 1713–1730 Bartholomæus Deichman
- 1731–1737 Peder Hersleb
- 1738–1758 Niels Dorph
- 1758–1773 Fredrik Nannestad
- 1773–1804 Christian Schmidt
- 1805–1822 Fredrik Julius Bech
- 1823–1845 Christian Sørenssen
- 1846–1874 Jens Lauritz Arup
- 1875–1893 Carl Peter Parelius Essendrop
- 1893–1896 Fredrik Wilhelm Klumpp Bugge
- 1896–1912 Anton Christian Bang
- 1912–1922 Jens Frølich Tandberg
- 1922–1937 Johan Lunde
- 1937–1951 Eivind Josef Berggrav
- 1951–1968 Johannes Smemo
- 1968–1973 Fridtjov Søiland Birkeli
- 1973–1977 Kaare Støylen
- 1977–1998 Andreas Aarflot
- 1998–2005 Gunnar Stålsett
- 2005–2017 Ole Christian Kvarme
- 2017–2025 Kari Veiteberg
- 2025–present Sunniva Gylver

== Deaneries ==
- Oslo arch-deanery
- Asker deanery
- Bærum deanery
- Nordre Aker deanery
- Søndre Aker deanery
- Vestre Aker deanery
- Østre Aker deanery
- Nationwide deaneries:
  - The deaf chaplain deanery
  - The military chaplain corps
