= Sunniva Gylver =

Norwegian Lutheran theologian and bishop (born 1967)

The Right Reverend Sunniva Gylver
- Bishop of Oslo
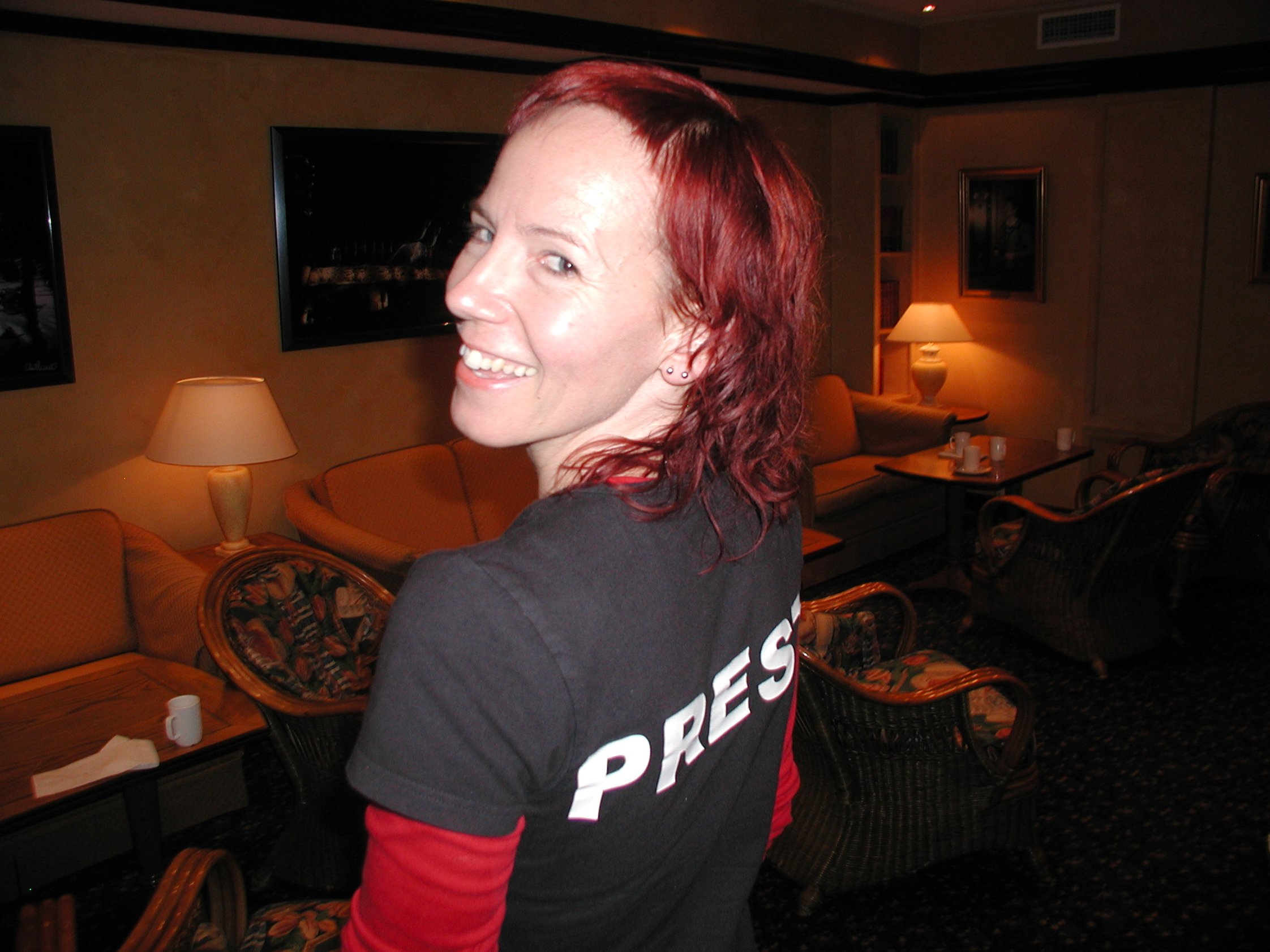
- Church: Church of Norway
- Diocese: Oslo
- Elected: 5 December 2024
- Predecessor: Kari Veiteberg

Orders
- Consecration: 23 February 2025 by Olav Fykse Tveit

Personal details
- Born: 1967 (age 58–59) Denmark
- Denomination: Lutheran

Sunniva Gylver (born 1967) is a Norwegian Lutheran theologian and bishop. She has been the Bishop of Oslo in the Church of Norway since 2025.

== Life and career ==
Born in 1967, in Denmark to Norwegian parents, Gylver grew up in Norway. She was a priest in Fagerborg Church in Oslo, until her election as bishop. She has been columnist for the newspapers Aftenposten and Vårt Land, and the magazine Familien.

Her books include Åpen Himmel (2000) and Søndager med Sunniva (2009).

== Bishop ==
Gylver was elected as bishop of the Diocese of Oslo on 5 December 2024, succeeding Kari Veiteberg.

She was consecrated as bishop on 23 February 2025.

== Bibliography ==
- 2000: Åpen himmel
- 2006: De store ordene – co-author
- 2007: Kunsten å bruke følelser – co-author
- 2009: Søndager med Sunniva
- 2019: Tro på tvers – co-author
- 2022: Midt i alt som er, Kagge Forlag
- 2024: Himmel på jord. Tanker for julen, Kagge Forlag – illustrated by Anne Kristin Hagesæther

== Television ==
- 1996: Nåde den som tror (religion and philosophy series), TV 2
- 1997: Deilig er jorden (religion and philosophy series), TV 2
- 1999: Kassa blanka (religion and philosophy series), NRK

Religious titles
Preceded by Kari Veiteberg	Bishop of Oslo; 2025–present	Succeeded by Incumbent
