= Frants Berg =

Bishop of Oslo 1548–1580

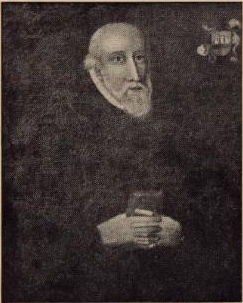
- Bishop Frants Berg

Personal details
- Born: 1504 Odense, Denmark
- Died: 2 November 1591 (aged 86–87) Oslo, Norway
- Denomination: Lutheran
- Parents: Claus Berg; Margrethe de Groth
- Spouse: Karine Lauridsdatter (ca. 1515-1570)
- Occupation: Bishop of the Diocese of Oslo
- Education: Odense University; University of Rostock

Frants Berg (1504 – 2 November 1591) was a Danish clergyman who served as the Bishop of Oslo.

He was born in Odense, Denmark. He was the son Claus Berg (ca. 1470 – ca. 1532) and his wife Margrethe de Groth. His father was a German born sculptor and painter who was engaged by John, King of Denmark and whose decorative work appeared in Danish churches. Queen Christina of Saxony (1461–1521), consort of King John, was his godmother. Queen Christine paid for his education, first at Odense University and later at the University of Rostock.

In 1531, he was rector in Odense, in 1540 he was vicar at Ribe Cathedral and in 1546 of St. Nicholas' Church in Copenhagen. The Protestant Reformation in Denmark and Norway was introduced in 1537 when King Christian III of Denmark declared Lutheranism as the official religion. Berg played a key role in the conversion of the Church of Norway. In 1548, he was promoted to superintendent in Oslo and Hamar. He served as Bishop of the Diocese of Oslo from 1548 to 1580.

After his retirement he resided in Oslo, where he died in 1591.

== Personal life ==
He was married to Karine Lauridsdatter (ca. 1515–1570). His daughter Gidse Frantsdatter Berg (born 1545) was married to Rasmus Hjort (ca. 1525–1604) who succeeded him as dean in Tønsberg. Berg's daughter Magdalena Frantsdatter Berg (1546–1583) married Jens Nilssøn (1538–1600) who succeeded him as Bishop of Oslo. He was the grandfather of Norwegian clergyman Christoffer Hjort (1561–1616).

Preceded by Anders Madssøn	Bishop of Oslo; 1548–1580	Succeeded by Jens Nilssøn
