= Frederik Nannestad =

Norwegian theologian, author and bishop

Right Reverend Frederik Nannestad
- Bishop
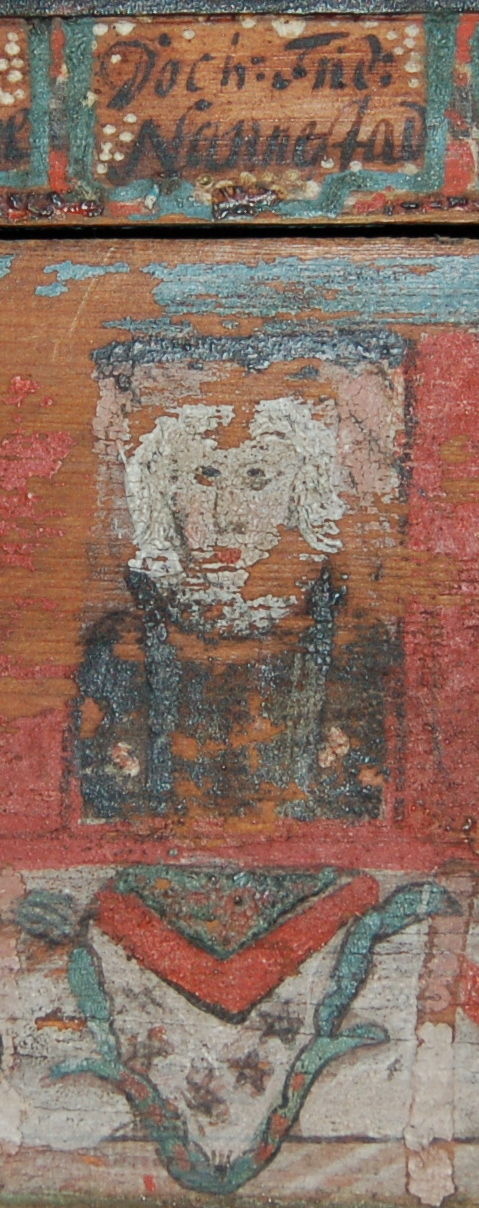
- Portrait of Bishop Nannestad
- Church: Church of Norway
- Diocese: Trondhjem

Personal details
- Born: 21 October 1693 Eidsberg, Norway
- Died: 11 August 1774 (aged 80) Christiania, Norway
- Denomination: Christian
- Parents: Christopher Jensen; Karen Tønnesdatter Unrov
- Spouse: Martha Elisabeth Jensdatter Wissing (1732)
- Occupation: Priest and Bishop
- Education: Magister in theology (1718)
- Alma mater: University of Copenhagen

Frederik Nannestad (21 October 1693 – 11 August 1774) was a Norwegian theologian, author, and bishop.

== Biography ==
Frederik Nannestad was born at Eidsberg in Østfold, Norway. He was the son of Christopher Jenssen Nannestad (1633–1707) and his third wife, Karen Tønnesdatter Unrow (1652–1716). He father had been a parish priest in the Church of Norway.

Nannestad received his master's degree from the University of Copenhagen in 1718. Initially he remained in the academic environment. In 1732 he became the dean in Aarhus. On 6 August 1732, he married Martha Elizabeth Jensdatter Wissing (1712–1734). She died two years later and he remained a widower for the rest of his life.

In 1742 he received his doctorate of theology.

On 11 May 1748, he was appointed the bishop of the Diocese of Nidaros. In 1758, after 10 years of work there, was he named the bishop of the Diocese of Oslo following the death of Bishop Niels Dorph. Nannestad remained a conservative orthodox theologian throughout his career. He had a reputation for learning and proper administration. He retired and left office on 1 October 1773 and died less than a year later.

== Selected works ==
- Dissertatio theologica de Mariolatria Pontificiorum horrenda, ex occasione monumenti cujusdam Edsbergensis in Norvegia (Copenhagen 1742)
- Hilaria Aarhusiensia ipso die unctionis Regiæ Friderici (Copenhagen 1748)
- Tronhiems Æres-Portes Beskrivelse, saadan som den mod Hs. kgl. Majestæts forventede Nærværelse (Trondheim 1749?)
- En christelig Prædiken over Psalm. LXXXIX, v. 1–6 (1749?)
- Afskeds-Skrivelse til Tronhjem, afsendt fra Christiania (1759)

Church of Norway titles
Preceded by Ludvig Harboe	Bishop of Trondhjem; 1748–1758	Succeeded by Johan Ernst Gunnerus
Preceded by Niels Dorph	Bishop of Christiania; 1758–1773	Succeeded by Christian Schmidt
