= Niels Simonsen Glostrup =

Danish priest (died 1639)

Niels Simonsen Glostrup (died 6 January 1639 in Christiania, Norway) was a Danish priest who became the seventh Lutheran Bishop of Oslo (after 1624: Christiania).

Niels Glostrup was born in a small town named Glostrup near Copenhagen, where his father, Simon Jensen, was a priest. At the University of Copenhagen, he appears in 1604 as a student and in 1608 as a responder in a disputation, which was held by Professor Hans Jensen Alanus at the University. Then he went aboard. In 1609 he was in Wittenberg. In 1612 he took his Master's Degree in Copenhagen and, in the same year, became a parish pastor in Køge, Denmark. The next year, he was engaged to marry Karen Andersdatter but she left him for King Christian IV. Niels married her sister Anna instead. In 1616 he was transferred to Helsingør to be its parish pastor. But he stayed for only a short time.

On 6 June 1617 he was appointed as the Bishop of Oslo. Here he performed his duties well, was eager for education of the youth and for moral order, and made himself so popular in his diocese, that, unlike his predecessor "The Evil Bishop" Niels Claussøn Senning, he was called “den gode Bisp [The Good Bishop]”. In 1636 he consecrated a gymnasium [high school] in Christiania, and sought to obtain talented teachers for it.

He was the brother-in-law of Oluf Boesen. When Glostrup became ill in 1638, Boesen assisted him in the execution of the official duties and, in the following year, succeeded him as the eighth Lutheran Bishop of Oslo, when Glostrup died.

Religious titles
Preceded by Niels Claussøn Senning	Bishop of Akershus stift 1617– 1639	Succeeded by Oluf Boesen
