= Kari Veiteberg =

Norwegian Lutheran theologian and bishop (born 1961)

The Right Reverend Kari Veiteberg D.Theol.
- Bishop of Oslo
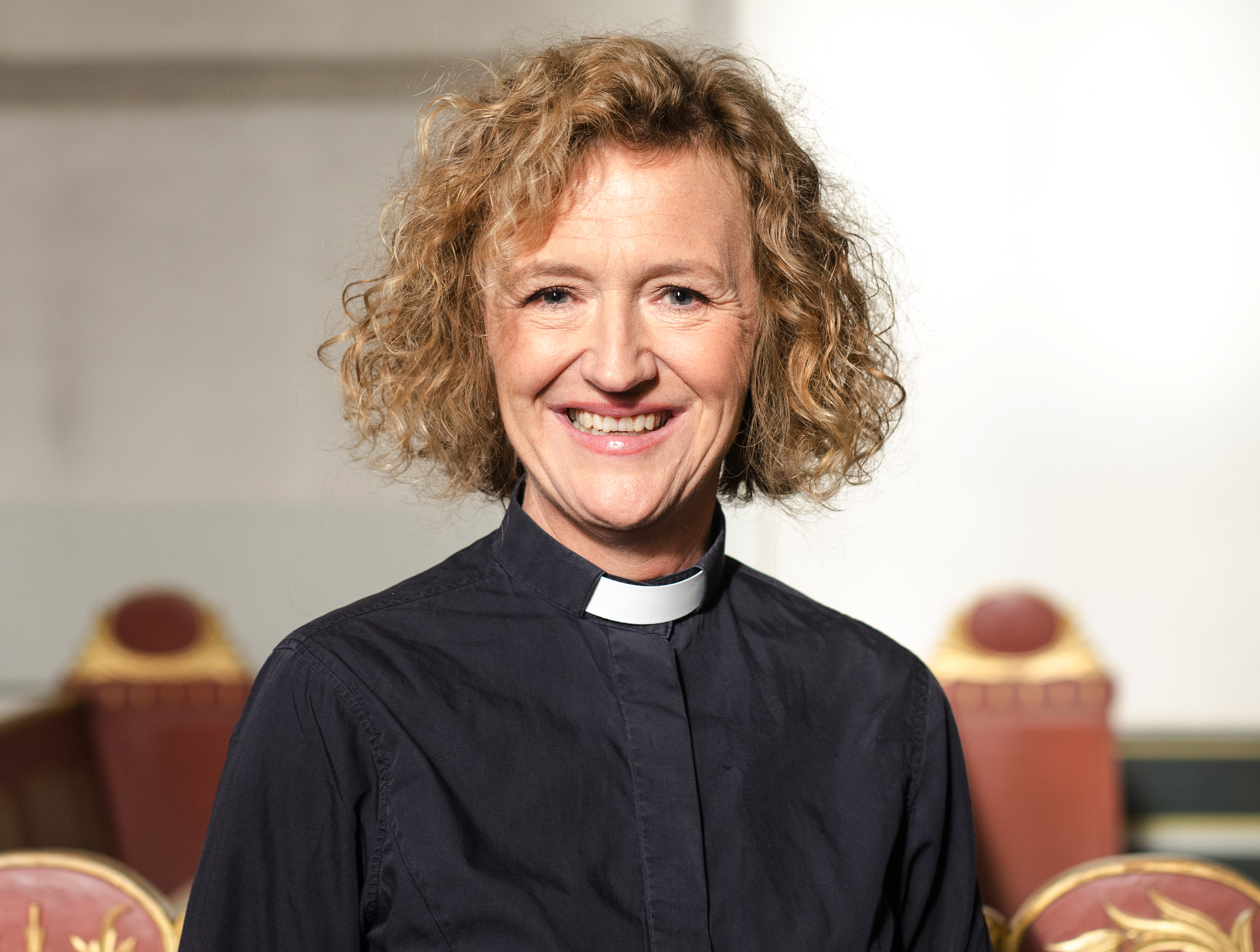
- Church: Church of Norway
- Diocese: Oslo
- Elected: 13 September 2017
- Term ended: 2025
- Predecessor: Ole Christian Kvarme
- Successor: Sunniva Gylver

Orders
- Ordination: 1992
- Consecration: 17 December 2017 by Helga Haugland Byfuglien

Personal details
- Born: 4 February 1961 (age 65)
- Denomination: Lutheran

Kari Veiteberg (born 4 February 1961) is a Norwegian Lutheran theologian and bishop. From December 2017 to February 2025 she was the Bishop of Oslo in the Church of Norway.

== Education ==
Veiteberg is graduated in (Lutheran) theology from the Faculty of Theology at the University of Oslo in 1988, and she took the practical theological exam at the practical theology seminary in Oslo in 1989. In 2006 she became Dr. Theol. at the University of Oslo with the dissertation Kunsten å framføre gudstenester. Dåp i Den norske kyrkja The Art of Performing Church Services. Baptism in the Norwegian Church. She also holds an intermediate degree in theatrical science from the Department of Music and Theater at the University of Oslo.

== Bishop ==
She was a city electoral priest at the Church Mission in Oslo when she was nominated as one of five candidates for the bishopric of Oslo on 19 May 2017. In the first round of voting, in the summer of 2017, she received the greatest support, with 29% of the votes. On September 13, 2017, the Church Council appointed her as the bishop in Oslo. She was consecrated as bishop on December 17, 2017.

In 2025 she decided to return to her role as a street pastor for Church City Mission, and was succeeded as Bishop of Oslo by Sunniva Gylver.

Religious titles
| Preceded by Ole Christian Kvarme | Bishop of Oslo; 2017–2025 | Succeeded by Sunniva Gylver |
