= Jens Lauritz Arup =

Norwegian politician (1793–1874)

- Church of Norway
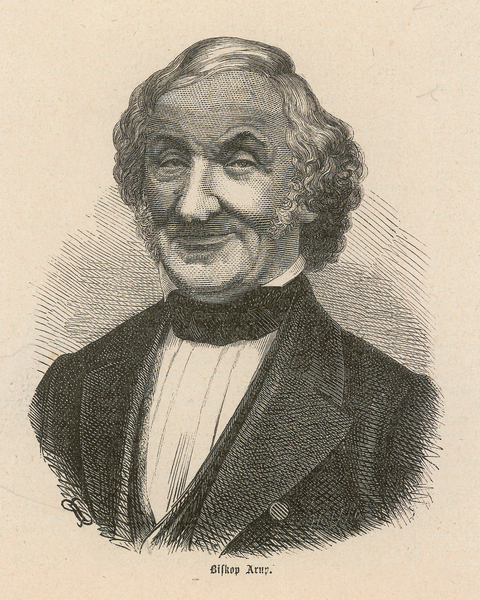
- Diocese: Kristiania
- Installed: 1846
- Term ended: 1874
- Predecessor: Christian Sørenssen
- Successor: Carl Peter Parelius Essendrop

Orders
- Ordination: 1818

Personal details
- Born: 20 April 1793 Kristiansand
- Died: 4 September 1874 (aged 81) Kristiania
- Buried: Gamlebyen gravlund in Kristiania
- Denomination: Lutheranism
- Parents: Thorkild A. Arup; Elen Dorthea Dokkedal
- Spouse: Didrikke Cappelen (1794–1833); Louise Jacobine Juliane Cappelen (1811–1842)
- Children: Didrik Arup (1835–1885)
- Education: Royal Frederick University

Jens Lauritz Arup (20 April 1793 – 9 April 1874) was a Norwegian bishop and politician.

He was born at Kristiansand in Vest-Agder, Norway. His father was a sexton and a school teacher. In 1811 Arup was sent to Copenhagen to study, but had to end his studies due to lack of funds. After returning to Norway he worked for a while as a teacher, until he could take his theological exam at the Royal Frederick University (now University of Oslo). In the following years he worked in Ullensaker, Drammen and Bragernes. He was made Bishop of Kristiania in 1846, and remained in the position until 1874.

Arup was also involved in politics, and in 1836 he was elected into the Norwegian Parliament (Stortinget) for Drammen constituency, where he was reelected in 1839, 1842 and 1845. He was later appointed temporarily councillor of state in interim for the Norwegian government in Sweden in the years 1852–53, 1857 and 1861. In 1860, Arup crowned Charles XV of Sweden king of Norway at Nidarosdomen in Trondheim.

He was a proponent of religious toleration for Protestant dissenters as both a bishop and politician, helping to pass legislation towards this goal in 1845. He was also in favour of greater liberty from the state for the Norwegian church.

Church of Norway titles
Preceded by Christian Sørenssen	Bishop of Kristiania; 1846–1874	Succeeded by Carl Peter Parelius Essendrop
