= Niels Claussøn Senning =

Danish-Norwegian Lutheran bishop (c. 1580 – 1617)

Niels Claussøn Senning (c. 1580 – 1617) was a Danish/Norwegian Lutheran Bishop.

Senning was born in Helsingør, Denmark. He studied at the University of Copenhagen, traveled as an eighteen year old abroad and received an enrollment at the University of Heidelberg in 1598. In 1606, he married Elline Winstrup), daughter of Peder Jensen Vinstrup (1549-1614), Bishop of the Diocese of Zealand. He served parish priest of Vor Frue Kirke in Copenhagen. He served as Bishop of the Diocese of Oslo from 1608 to 1617. He is known for his participation in the expulsion of secret Roman Catholic priests in the diocese and was called in his own time "The Evil Bishop". He died in Oslo in 1617.

Preceded by Anders Bendssøn Dall	Bishop of Oslo; 1607–1617	Succeeded by Niels Simonsen Glostrup
