= Jens Nilssøn =

Norwegian clergyman, educator, poet and author (1538–1600)

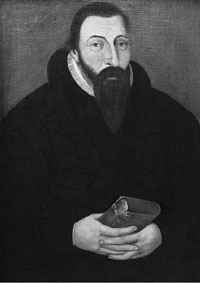
A portrait traditionally believed to be Jens Nilssøn, although it is now considered likely to be his successor as Bishop, Anders Bendssøn Dall

Jens Nilssøn (in Latin Joannis Nicolai) (1538–1600) was a Norwegian clergyman, educator, poet and author. He served as the Bishop of Oslo from the years 1580 to 1600.

== Biography ==
Nilssøn was born in Oslo, Norway. After the death of his father, his mother moved to Denmark. He went to school in Copenhagen and Roskilde. He became Rector at Oslo Cathedral School in 1563. He was one of the Oslohumanisterne, a group of men associated with St. Hallvard's Cathedral and Oslo Cathedral School. Through their scholarly studies, they represented a breakthrough of humanism in Norway. He took his Master's Degree from the University of Copenhagen in 1571. He served as an assistant and aide to Bishop Frants Berg and in 1564 he married the bishop's daughter Magdalena (1546-1583). When Bishop Berg retired in 1580, Jens Nilsson succeeded him in the bishopric.

As Bishop, he oversaw the completion of the Reformation in his diocese. He published several books in Latin and Danish and corresponded with other leading personalities of the time in Denmark-Norway, among them Tycho Brahe. Due to his prolific writing, he is the Norwegian person who lived before 1600 who is best known today. He is known for his visitation books, which paint a unique picture of Norway in the 16th century. He also wrote poetry in Latin, was interested in natural sciences, particularly astronomy, and had a passion for Norwegian prehistory. He preserved several medieval manuscripts, including Jǫfraskinna, which included parts of Heimskringla.

== Selected works ==
- Nilssøn, Jens: Ligpredicken som udi erlig velbyrdig oc salig Henrick Brockenhusis Begraffuelse bleff predicket i Oensø Kircke i Norge den 16. Junij Aar etc. 1588. Kiøbenhaffn: Wingaard, 1590.
- Nilssøn, Jens: In Genesin seu primum Mosi volumen proœmium. Rostochii: Imprimebat Stephanus Myliander, 1597.

== Other sources ==
- Brandrud, Andreas and Kolsrud, Oluf (eds.): To og Tredive Prædikener. Kristiania: Aschehoug, 1917.
- Kraggerud, Egil (ed.): Johannes Nicolai. Biskop Jens Nilssøns latinske skrifter. Oslo: Universitetsforlaget, 2004.
- Kyrkjebø, Rune (ed.): Heimskringla I etter Jǫfraskinna. Bergen: Nordisk institutt, 2001. ISBN 82-497-0023-6
- Nielsen, Yngvar: Biskop Jens Nilssøns liv og virksomhed 1538–1600, i Biskop Jens Nilssøns visitatsbøger og reiseerindringer 1574–1597. Kristiania: A. W. Brøgger, 1885. (Utgitt som faksimile på initiativ av Bohusläns hembygdsförening av Carl Zachariasson, Ed i 1981.).

== Related literature ==
- Bang, Anton Christian: Den norske kirkes historie i reformations-aarhundredet. Kristiania: Hjalmar Biglers Forlag, 1895.
- Bull, Francis: Norges litteratur fra reformasjonen til 1814. Oslo: Aschehoug, 1958.
- Holm-Olsen, Ludvig: Fra runene til Norske selskab. Norges litteraturhistorie, bind 1. 1995. ISBN 82-02-15469-3

Preceded by Frants Berg	Bishop of Oslo; 1580–1600	Succeeded by Anders Bendssøn Dall
