= Christen Schmidt =

Norwegian bishop

- Church of Norway
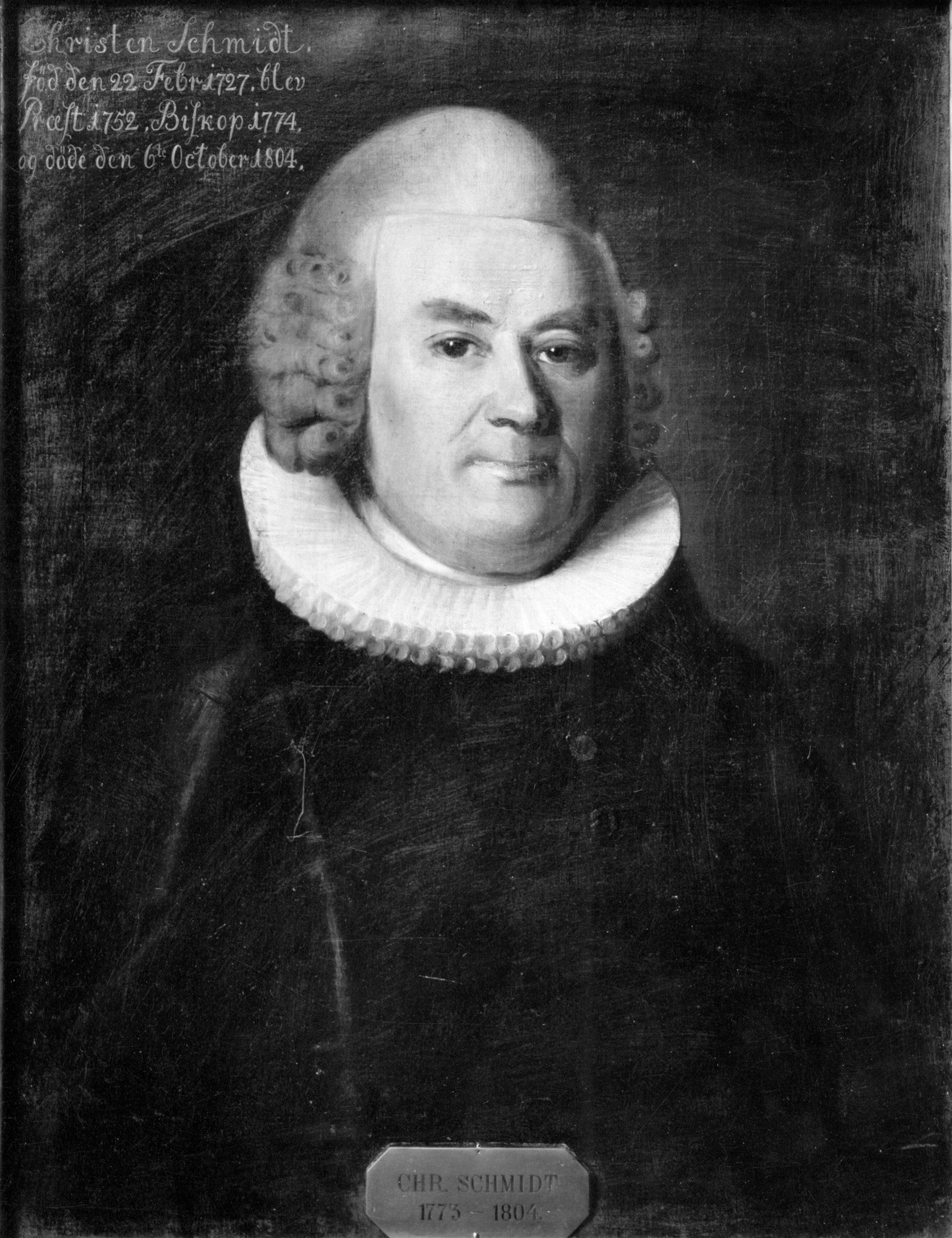
- Portrait of Christen Schmidt
- Diocese: Diocese of Oslo
- Installed: 1773
- Term ended: 1804

Personal details
- Born: 22 February 1727 Kongsvinger, Denmark-Norway
- Died: 6 October 1804 (aged 77)
- Denomination: Lutheranism
- Parents: Hans Jacob Schmidt; Alethe S. Lemmich
- Spouse: Petronelle Lemmich (married 1759–1798); Ingeborg Catharina Birkenbusch (1803–1804)
- Children: Frederik Schmidt
- Education: University of Copenhagen

Christen Schmidt (22 February 1727 – 6 October 1804) was a Norwegian bishop.

== Life and career ==
He was born in Kongsvinger as a son of vicar Hans Jacob Schmidt and Alethe S. Lemmich. He enrolled as a student in 1745 and graduated with the cand.theol. degree in May 1748. After some years as a private tutor and a priest at sea, he was appointed as vicar of Nebbelunde, Denmark in July 1759. In September 1769 he became vicar of Asminderød and Fredensborg Palace. He became connected to the Danish Royal Court in July 1772, having been opposed to Johan Friedrich Struensee's rule. In December 1773 he became Bishop of the Diocese of Christiania. Here he was known to be orthodox. He supported the death penalty in 1777.

== Personal life ==
He was married twice. First to his cousin Petronelle Lemmich, from June 1759 to her death in September 1798. They had the son Frederik Schmidt, a constitutional founding father. His second marriage was to merchant's daughter Ingeborg Catharina Birkenbusch (1778–1856), from November 1803 to his own death.

Church of Norway titles
Preceded by Frederik Nannestad	Bishop of Christiania; 1773–1804	Succeeded by Nicolai Lumholtz (acting)
