= Gunnar Stålsett =

Norwegian politician (born 1935)

The Right Reverend Gunnar Stålsett
- Bishop Emeritus of Oslo
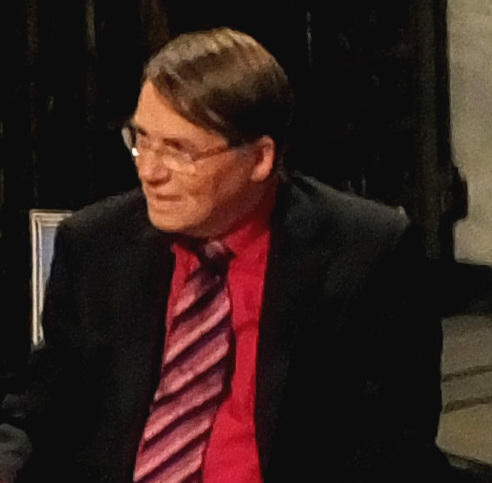
- Church: Church of Norway
- Diocese: Oslo
- Appointed: 1998
- In office: 1998–2005
- Predecessor: Andreas Aarflot
- Successor: Ole Christian Kvarme

Orders
- Consecration: 1998

Personal details
- Born: Gunnar Sirkka; 10 February 1935 (age 91) Nordkapp, Norway
- Parents: Johan Emil Stålsett; Alma Elisabeth Joki
- Spouse: Married
- Children: 2

Gunnar Johan Stålsett (born 10 February 1935, in Nordkapp) is a Norwegian theologian and politician. He was leader of the Centre Party 1977–1979, general secretary of the Lutheran World Federation 1985–1993 and bishop of Oslo, in the Church of Norway 1998–2005.

== Early life ==
Gunnar Stålsett was born in Repvåg in Nordkapp Municipality to principal Johan Emil Stålsett and Alma Elisabeth Joki. He was one of eight children. When he was seven the family moved to Gildeskål Municipality. His parents were inspired by the Laestadian movement in Finnmark. After having completed school in Leknes he went to high school in Nordfjordeid where he graduated in 1953.

== Theological career ==
Stålsett is a graduate from MF Norwegian School of Theology in Oslo, and was awarded the qualification cand.theol. in 1961. He has worked as a minister and taught at the University of Oslo. He has also been a General Secretary of the Lutheran World Federation and a member of the Norwegian Nobel Committee until he was appointed to bishop in 1998. He stepped down from office on 28 February 2005. His predecessor was Andreas Aarflot, and he was succeeded in Office by Ole Christian Kvarme.

Stålsett has also had a political career. From 1972 to 1973, during the cabinet Korvald, he was appointed state secretary in the Ministry of Church Affairs and Education. He served as a deputy representative to the Norwegian Parliament from Oslo in during the term 1977–1981, and chaired the Centre Party from 1977 to 1979.

== Awards ==
- 2013: Niwano Peace Prize
- 2021: Officers Cross of the Order of Merit of the Federal Republic of Germany

Party political offices
| Preceded by Dagfinn Vårvik | Chairman of the Centre Party; 1977–1979 | Succeeded by Johan J. Jakobsen |
Church of Norway titles
| Preceded by Andreas Aarflot | Bishop of Oslo; 1998–2005 | Succeeded by Ole Christian Kvarme |
