= Ole Christian Kvarme =

Norwegian bishop of the Church of Norway (born 1948)

The Right Reverend Ole Christian Kvarme
- Bishop Emeritus of Oslo
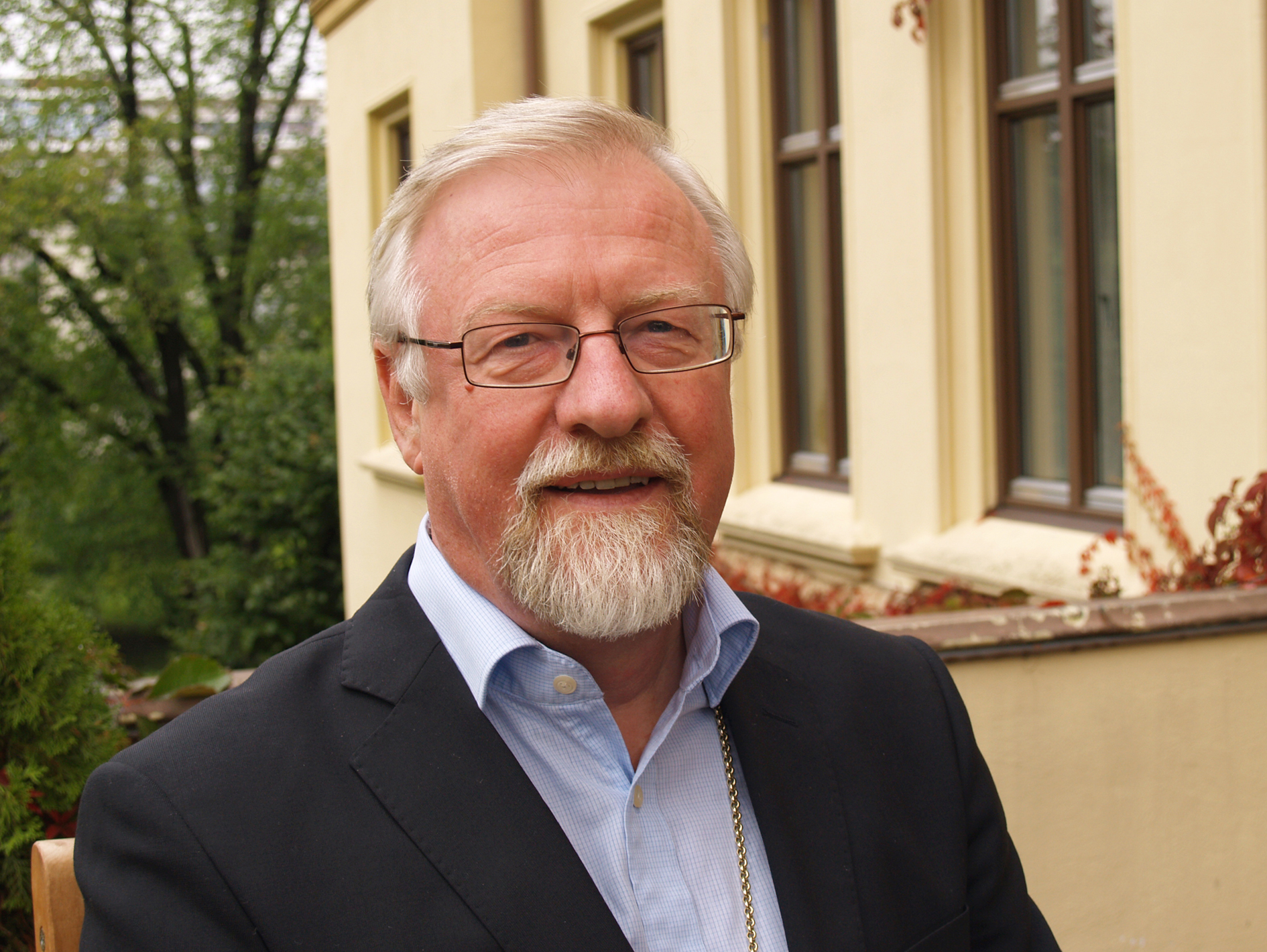
- Church: Church of Norway
- Diocese: Oslo
- Appointed: 2005
- In office: 2005–2017
- Predecessor: Gunnar Stålsett
- Successor: Kari Veiteberg
- Previous post: Bishop of Borg (1998-2005)

Orders
- Ordination: 1975
- Consecration: 1998

Personal details
- Born: November 11, 1948 (age 77) Molde, Norway
- Education: MF Norwegian School of Theology

Ole Christian Mælen Kvarme (born November 11, 1948, in Molde) is a Norwegian prelate of the Church of Norway who served as Bishop of Oslo from 2005 to 2017. As Bishop of Oslo, Kvarme was the personal prelate of the Norwegian royal family.

He graduated from the MF Norwegian School of Theology in 1974, and studied further in Göttingen and Jerusalem. He was ordained to priest for mission service abroad in Bodø in 1975.

Kvarme worked as a research assistant at the MF Norwegian School of Theology 1972 to 1974, as a Bible translator for the Norwegian Bible Society from 1973, as a military chaplain in 1975, as a missionary priest for Den Norske Israelsmisjon in Haifa 1976 to 1981. He was the executive secretary of the Norwegian Bible Society in Israel and of the Norwegian Bible Society on the West Bank from 1976 to 1981. From 1982 to 1986 he led the Caspari Center for Biblical and Jewish Studies, and from 1986 to 1996 he was secretary general of the Norwegian Bible Society.

He was Dean in Oslo Cathedral from 1996 to 1998 and was appointed Bishop of Borg in 1998. In 2005, he was appointed Bishop of Oslo. His appointment as Bishop of Oslo by the second cabinet Bondevik was criticized by non-Christians and liberal Christians because he is loyal to the decision of the highest body of the Church of Norway not to allow non-celibate gay people as priests.

== Education ==
In 1970, he graduated with a major in Hebrew language at the University of Oslo. In 1974, the graduated with a cand.theol. degree from the practical-theology seminary at MF Norwegian School of Theology. From 1975-1976, he undertook studies in Rabbinics and Judaism in Göttingen and Jerusalem. In 1975, he was ordained in Bodø as a priest for mission service abroad.

== Work experience ==
- Scientific assistant, 1972-74.
- Bible translator, the Norwegian Bible Society, 1973.
- Served as military chaplain, 1975
- Missionary priest, Den Norske Israelsmisjon, Haifa 1976-81.
- Executive secretary of the Norwegian Bible Society in Israel and for the Norwegian Bible Society on the West Bank - for the United Bible Societies, 1976-81.
- Manager, the Caspari Center for Biblical and Jewish Studies, 1982-86.
- Secretary-general in the Norwegian Bible Society, 1986-96.
- Dean in Oslo Cathedral, 1996–98
- Bishop in the Diocese of Borg, 1998-2005
- Bishop in the Diocese of Oslo 2005-2017

== Appointments ==
From 1976-1986, he was the leader of United Christian Council in Israel. He was also a member of the World Council of Churches Consultation on the Church and the Jewish People. He was the Vice President of the General Assembly of the MF Norwegian School of Theology. He was a member of the newspaper's Vårt Land's board of advisors. He was the President for the Lausanne Consultation on Jewish Evangelism. He was a member of the dialogue group for Lutheran World association and Seventh-Day Adventist's General meeting.

== Publications ==
- Kirkens jødiske røtter, Oslo 1985.
- Apostlenes Gjerninger - studiebok på hebraisk, Jerusalem 1986.
- Bibelen i Norge, Oslo 1991.
- Evighet i tiden. En bok om jødisk sabbatsglede og kristen søndagsfeiring, Oslo 1992.
- Evangeliet i vår kultur, Oslo 1995 (together with Olav Fykse Tveit).
- Åtte dager i Jerusalem. En bok om Jesu påske, om jødisk og kristen påskefeiring, Oslo 1996.
- Gjennom det gode landet, Oslo 1997.

Church of Norway titles
Preceded by Even Fougner	Bishop of Borg; 1998–2005	Succeeded by Helga Byfuglien
Preceded by Gunnar Stålsett	Bishop of Oslo; 2005–2017	Succeeded by Kari Veiteberg
