= Heftye =

Heftye is a surname. Notable people with the surname include:

- Henrik Heftye (1804–1864), Norwegian businessman and philanthropist
- Johannes Thomassen Heftye (1792–1856), Norwegian businessman and politician
- Thomas Heftye (1860–1921), Norwegian military officer, engineer, sports official and politician
- Thomas Johannessen Heftye (1822–1886), Norwegian businessman, politician and philanthropist
