= Frits Hansen =

Norwegian educator, newspaper editor, biographer and politician

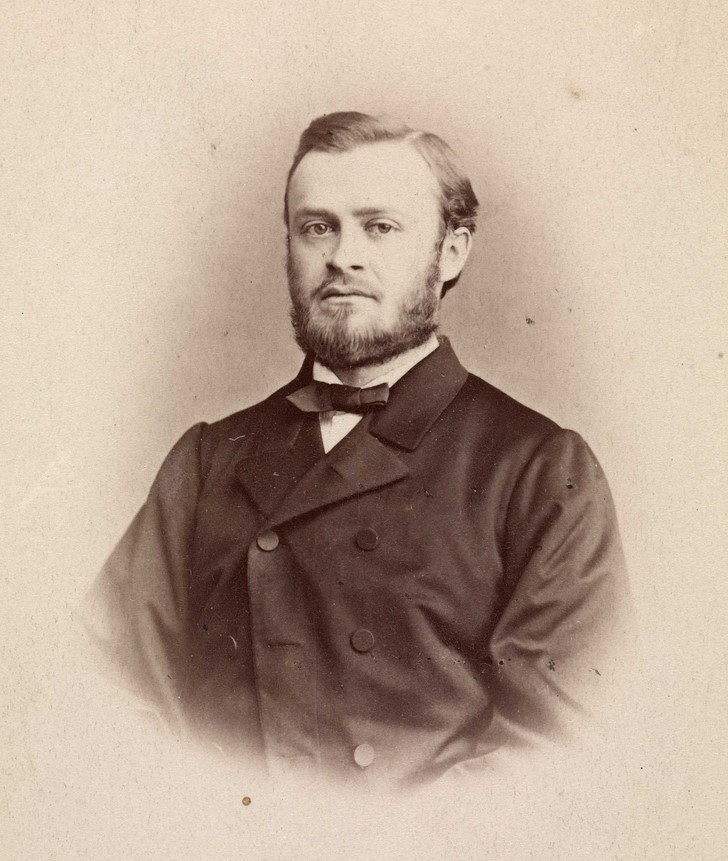
- Born: 31 January 1841; Larvik, Norway
- Died: 8 June 1911 (aged 70)
- Occupations: Educator, newspaper editor, biographer and politician

Frits Hansen (31 January 1841 – 8 June 1911) was a Norwegian educator, newspaper editor, biographer and politician.

Hansen was born at Larvik, in Vestfold, Norway. He was the son of Magistrate Frederik Christian Hansen (1799–1860) and Albine Elise Fougnerbakken (1801–1846). He earned his Cand.theol. degree in 1865. Subsequently, he became a teacher at the Norwegian Military Academy. From 1872, Hansen taught at Sagatun Folk High School in Hamar. In 1881 Hansen was a teacher at a private middle school in Stavanger. He was also editor of the Lillehammer newspaper Framgang. In 1890, he wrote Edvard Storm, digteren fra Vaage, a biography of the poet Edvard Storm. In 1896 he moved to Christiania (now Oslo) and was editor of Eidsvold. He was the chairman and founder of the regional centrist-conservative political party Centre in the 1890s.

== Personal life ==
In 1872, he married Ingeborg Marie Heftye (1852–1894). Her father Thomas Johannessen Heftye was deputy representative to the Norwegian Parliament and her brother was Norwegian Defense Minister Thomas Heftye. Her grandfather Johannes Thomassen Heftye had founded the Norwegian bank company, Thos. Joh. Heftye & Søn .
