= School of Business and Law (University of Agder) =

The School of Business and Law at the University of Agder, Norway, builds on academic traditions that date back to 1969, when the two-year economics and business administration programme was a cornerstone of Agder Regional College (ADH) in Kristiansand Municipality. In 1994, ADH was included in Agder University College (HiA) as a result of a national reform, and in 2007 the University of Agder (UiA) was established.

The School of Business and Law is considered a leading business school in Norway.

A four-year programme in economics and business administration has been given since 1988, and since 1992 the title siviløkonom has been awarded. The school comprises as a faculty all study programmes at the University of Agder in the fields of business administration and law. In autumn 2013, nearly 1,700 students were registered at study programmes belonging to the School of Business and Law.

The School's main base is in Kristiansand, but it also has students and staff at the UiA campus in Grimstad Municipality.

The School of Business and Law is formally organized as a faculty at the University of Agder, which was nationally accredited by NOKUT (Norwegian Agency for Quality Assurance in Education) in 2007. The School of Business and Law is a member of EFMD and AACSB, and holds an international AACSB accreditation for its high-quality education on an international level.

== Study programmes ==
The School of Business and Law offers business administration and management education at all levels: PhD, master's and bachelor's degree. In addition, the School offers numerous courses in business administration, law and management.

== Departments ==
Faculty members are organized in departments:

- Department of Economics and Finance
- Department of Management
- Department of Working Life and Innovation
- Department of Law

== Centres ==
Much of the research activity is related to centres:

- Centre for Real Estate
- Centre for Entrepreneurship
- Centre for Advanced Studies in Regional Innovation Strategies (RIS)
- Norwegian Centre for Microfinance Research
- Crowdfunding Research Centre (CRC)

== Student organizations ==
Student organizations are responsible for a range of social, scholarly and outreach activities for students. In addition, they facilitate contact between students and the school's management. The organizations are provided with office space free of charge and receive some support from the university. The organizations include:

- Mercurius (organizes master's students in business administration)
- Justitius (organizes law students)
- Revisus (organizes accounting students)
- Touristicus (organizes tourism students)
- Emporium (organizes marketing students)
- Indøk Sør (organizes master's students in industrial economics)

Career Fair and Business Conference Mercurius is the driving force behind the Career Fair in Kristiansand held in the autumn semester. In addition, Mercurius organizes an annual business conference in Kristiansand called Norge på nytt.
