= Jørgen Brunchorst =

Norwegian naturalist and politician (1862–1917)

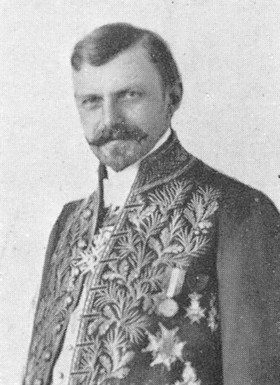

Minister of Labour
- In office 28 September 1907 – 19 March 1908
- Prime Minister: Christian Michelsen; Jørgen Løvland
- Preceded by: Kristofer Lehmkuhl
- Succeeded by: Nils Claus Ihlen

Personal details
- Born: 10 August 1862 Bergen, Hordaland, United Kingdoms of Sweden and Norway
- Died: 19 May 1917 (aged 54) Rome, Kingdom of Italy
- Party: Independent
- Spouse(s): Andrea Langaard (m. 1911) Ellen Bull (m. 1886; div. 1911)
- Occupation: Natural scientist Diplomat; Politician

Jørgen Brunchorst (10 August 1862 – 19 May 1917) was a Norwegian natural scientist, politician and diplomat.

== Biography ==
Brunchorst was born in Bergen, the son of ship builder and – captain Christian Ege Brunchorst (1835–64) and his wife Emma Wesenberg (1837–1919). His nephew Knut Fægri was one of the most outstanding botanists of the 20th century. Brunchorst specialised in botany at university, and after finishing his Ph.D. in Germany, he became director of Bergen Museum. In this position, he worked towards popularising the natural sciences, and was also a pioneer in the field of plant pathology in Norway.

Brunchorst was also a politician, representing the Liberal Party and later the Coalition Party. He sat in the Norwegian parliament in the periods 1895–97 and 1903–06. He was later appointed Minister of Labour towards the end of Christian Michelsen's cabinet in September 1907, and remained in that position during the short-lived cabinet of Jørgen Løvland, from October 1907 to March 1908. Shortly before his period in the government, he had served as a diplomat in Havana, Cuba. After the government fell he returned to Havana, before being transferred to Stockholm, Sweden, in 1910. In 1916 he was again transferred, to Rome, Italy, where he died the next year.

The standard author abbreviation Brunch. is used to indicate this person as the author when citing a botanical name.

== See also ==
- Samtiden, a magazine founded by Brunchorst
