= Battleships Asbjørnsen and Moe =

1905 rumour about fake Norwegian ships

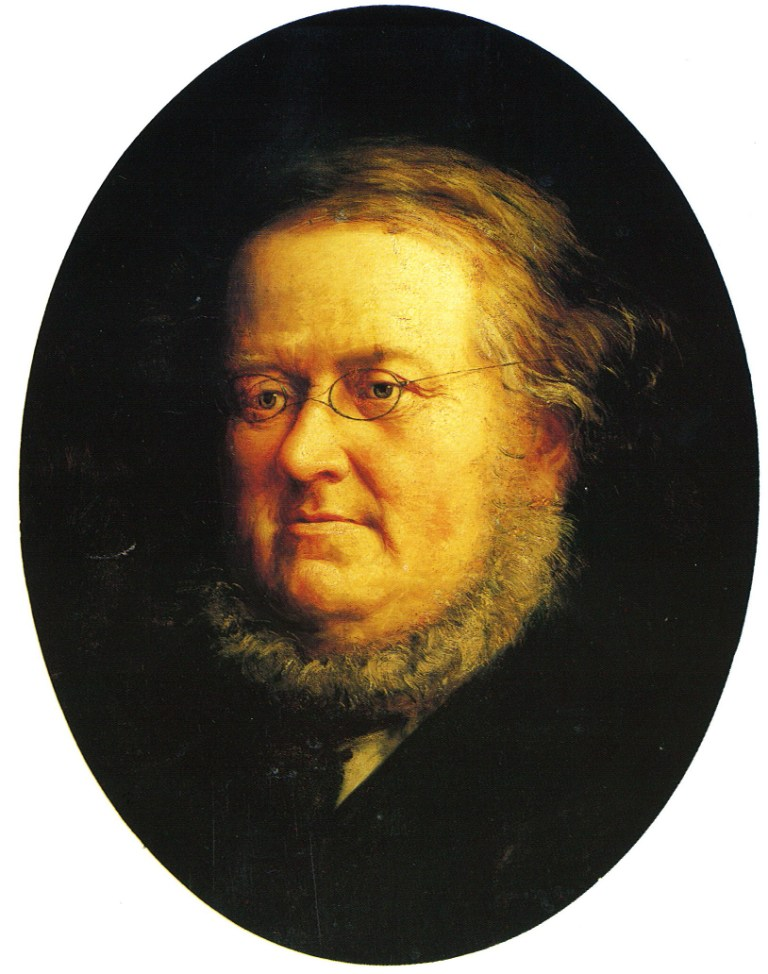
Peter Christen Asbjørnsen

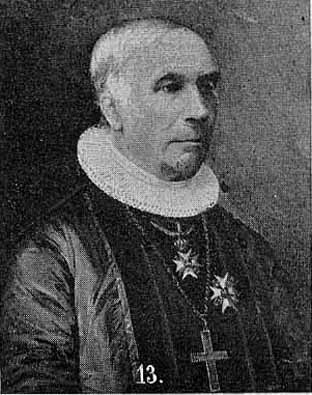
Jørgen Moe

The battleships Asbjørnsen and Moe were two fictitious ships that raised concern in the Swedish intelligence services at the time of the dissolution of the union between Norway and Sweden in 1905.

A Norwegian emigrant to Argentina, the wealthy businessman and diplomat Peter "Don Pedro" Christophersen, had negotiated with the government of Argentina to purchase two battleships. In the end, no deal was concluded, but the rumor disturbed the Swedes—and Prime Minister Christian Michelsen declined to deny that the purchase had taken place. The non-existent battleships were christened the Asbjørnsen and Moe after the writers Peter Christen Asbjørnsen and Jørgen Moe.

The incident took place in the context of naval tensions between Norway and Sweden following Norwegian independence, which came to a head in the Admiral Conflict (Norwegian: Admiralstriden). At the time, the Royal Norwegian Navy was more suitable for coastal defense, but the Swedish navy was much stronger. Norway's naval commanders wanted to demonstrate that Norway was capable of defending itself at sea but did not want to provoke Sweden into armed conflict. Commanding Admiral Christian Sparre and his chief of staff, Rear Admiral Jacob Børresen, strongly disagreed on the best strategy to pursue in the event of war with Sweden.
