= Peter Christophersen =

Norwegian diplomat (1845–1930)

- Born: May 28, 1845; Tønsberg
- Died: August 19, 1930 (aged 85)
- Occupation: Businessman

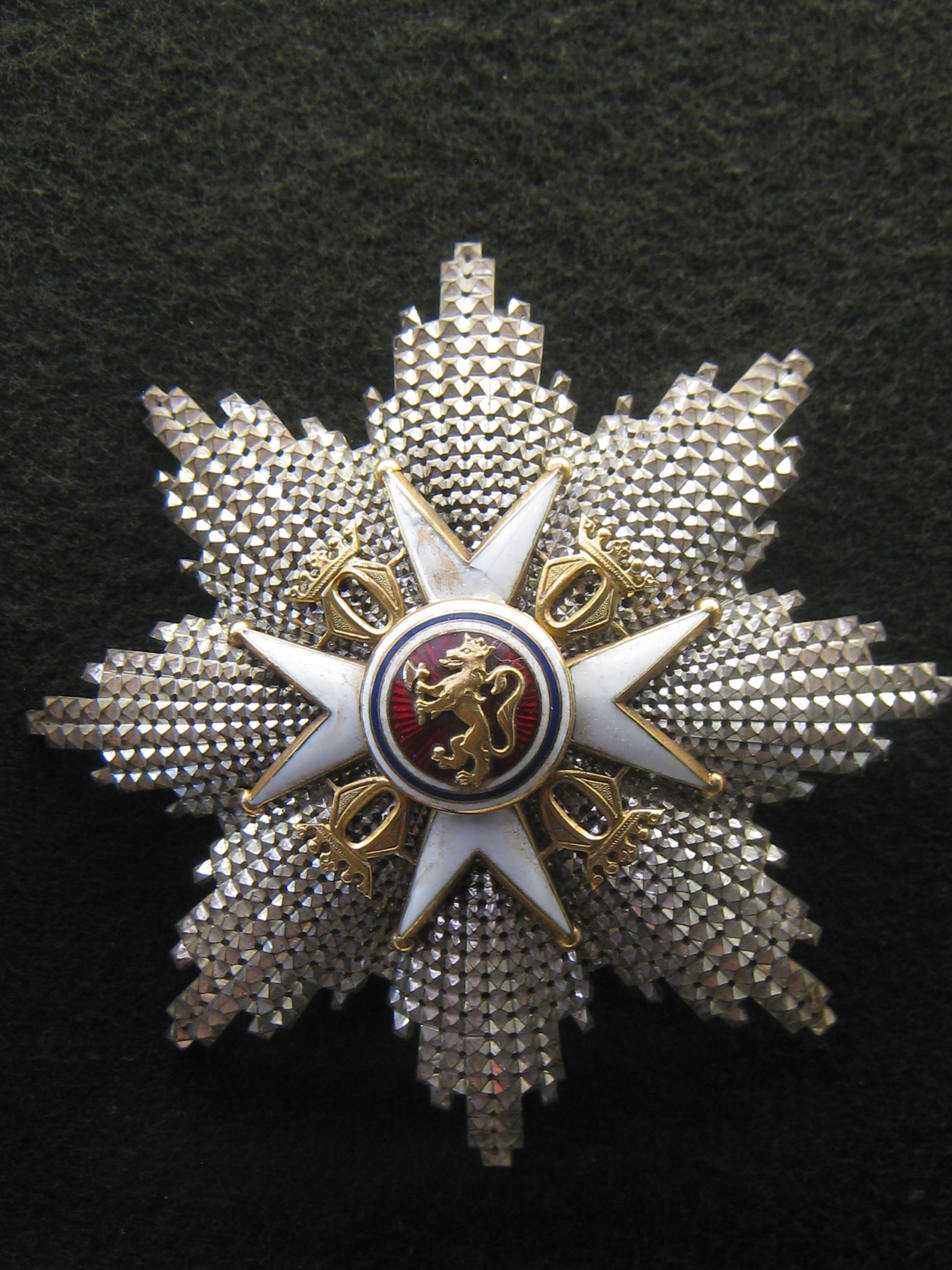
Christophersen's Norwegian Order of St. Olav

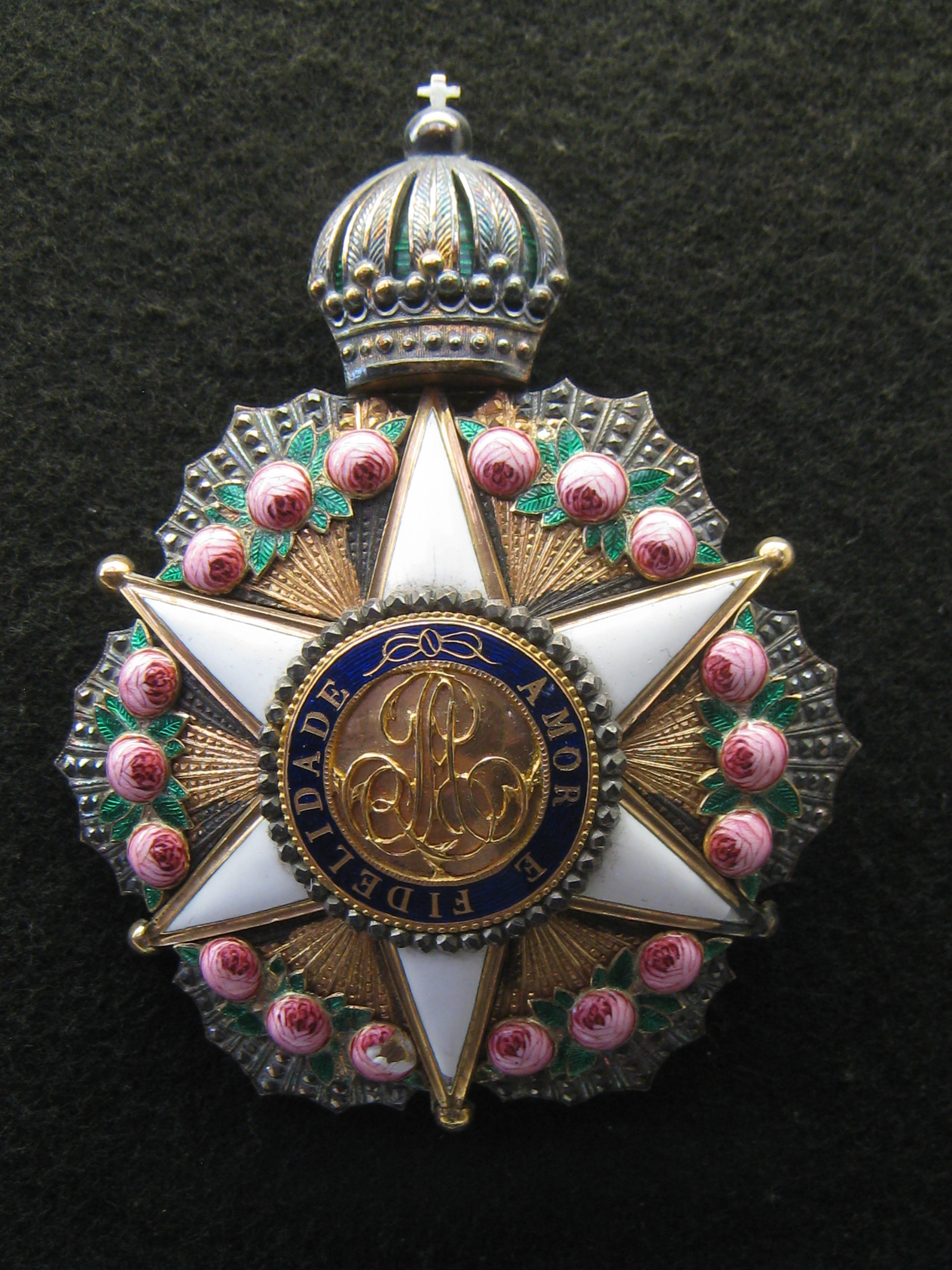
Christophersen's Brazilian Order of the Rose

Peter "Don Pedro" Christophersen (May 28, 1845 – August 19, 1930) was a Norwegian businessman, landowner, and diplomat in Argentina.

== Early life and family ==
Christophersen was born in Tønsberg, the son of the customs official Ole Christophersen (1796–1878) and his wife, Tobine Christine Petersen. Christophersen was the brother of Norwegian Foreign Minister Wilhelm Christopher Christophersen (1832–1913); the Danish general consul in Montevideo, Otto Thorvald Alexander Christophersen (1834–1896), the Oslo wholesaler and factory owner Christian Eilert Rasch Christophersen (1840–1900);and the diplomat Søren Andreas Christophersen (1849–1933), who also lived in Buenos Aires.

== Education and career ==
Christophersen attended the civil school in Tønsberg, and then spent much of his adult life abroad. From 1865 to 1871 he was a shipbroker in Cádiz. Christophersen went to Argentina in 1871, where he established himself as a shipbroker and landowner. Her served as a vice consul and chargé d'affaires for Russia from 1881 to 1902, and as a vice consul for Denmark from 1884 to 1902. Christophersen was active in the business world and public life in Argentina. From 1891 to 1908 he served as the chairman for trade law and the stock exchange in Buenos Aires and he took part in several public committees on customs, port matters, and railway development. Christophersen also helped sponsor expeditions, including Roald Amundsen's South Pole expedition (1910–1912). He was also a central figure in the negotiations to purchase the Asbjørnsen and Moe. Christophersen died in Buenos Aires.

== Awards ==
Christophersen was honored with a number of Norwegian and other orders for his work. In 1901, he was named a knight, first class of the Order of St. Olav, and he was promoted to commander first class in 1909 and awarded the order's grand cross in 1911 "for political service and public activity." Christophersen received the grand cross of the Swedish Order of the Polar Star. He was named a commander of the Order of the Dannebrog, an officer of the Order of Orange-Nassau, a commander of the Order of the Crown of Italy, a commander of the Order of Isabella the Catholic, and a knight of the Austrian Order of the Iron Crown. Christophersen was honored by Russia with the Order of Saint Stanislaus (second class with stars) and the Order of St. Anna (second class with diamonds). Christophersen also received the Brazilian Order of the Rose. His orders are displayed at the Fram Museum in Oslo.

== Legacy ==
Mount Don Pedro Christophersen, in Antarctica, is named after Christophersen.
