= Karl Friedrich Griffin Dawes =

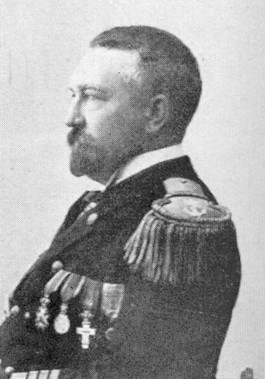

Commanding Admiral of Norway
- In office 1910–1919
- Preceded by: Christian Sparre
- Succeeded by: Alfred Berglund

Minister of Defence
- In office 23 October 1907 – 19 March 1908
- Prime Minister: Jørgen Løvland
- Preceded by: Wilhelm Olssøn
- Succeeded by: Thomas Heftye

Personal details
- Born: 5 January 1861 Fredrikstad, Østfold, United Kingdoms of Sweden and Norway
- Died: 8 April 1941 (aged 80) Horten, Vestfold, Norway
- Party: Liberal
- Spouse: Karoline Sofie Wille
- Children: 5

Karl Friedrich Griffin Dawes (5 January 1861 – 8 April 1941) was a Norwegian naval officer and politician for the Liberal Party. He is best known as the Norwegian Minister of Defence from 1907 to 1908.

== Career ==
He was born in Fredrikstad as the son of engineer and merchant Henry Dawes and his wife Caroline Griffin. He started on a career in the military, graduating from the Norwegian Naval Academy in 1884 and the Military College in 1885. He was promoted successively to second lieutenant in 1882, premier lieutenant in 1885, captain in 1894, captain commander in 1900 and commander in 1903. From 1895 to 1901 he worked in the Ministry of Defence, and from 1901 to 1902 he stayed in Horten. He was a member of Kristiania city council for the term 1898–1901, and was elected to Horten city council in 1901.

From 1902 to 1910 he was the director of the Norwegian Naval Academy, except for the years 1907 to 1908. On 23 October 1907, when the Løvland cabinet assumed office, he was appointed as the new Minister of Defence. He held this position until 18 March 1908, when the cabinet fell. In 1910 he reached the rank of rear admiral. As such he was responsible for the Royal Norwegian Navy Neutrality Guard during World War I, helping to keep Norway out of the war. He died in April 1941.

Political offices
Preceded by Christian Michelsen	Norwegian Minister of Defence; 1907–1908	Succeeded by Thomas Heftye
Military offices
Preceded by Christian Sparre	Commanding Admiral in Norway; 1910–1919	Succeeded by Alfred Berglund
