= 1905 Norwegian union dissolution referendum =

Referendum ratifying Norway's separation from Sweden

- 13 August 1905
- Do you approve the "ratified dissolution of the Union"?

Results
Choice	Votes	%
Yes	368,208	99.95%
No	184	0.05%
Valid votes	368,392	99.05%
Invalid or blank votes	3,519	0.95%
Total votes	371,911	100.00%
Registered voters/turnout	435,376	85.42%

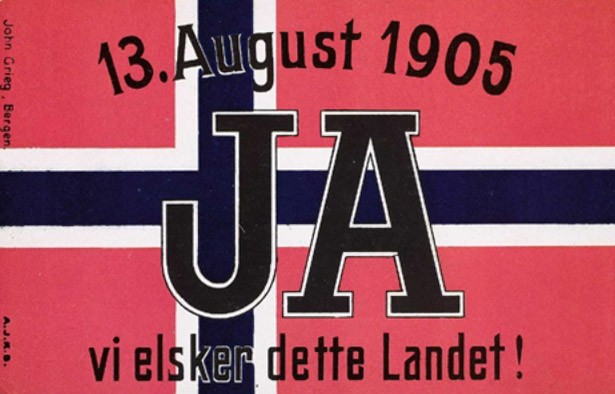
Post card urging people to vote yes to the dissolution of the Union.

A referendum on dissolving the union with Sweden was held in Norway on 13 August 1905. Voters were asked whether they endorsed the Storting's declaration of 7 June that the personal union, in place since 1814, had ceased to exist. Dissolution was approved by 368,208 votes to 184, or 99.95% of valid votes, on a voter turnout of 85.4%, one of the most lopsided results in the history of national referendums.

The vote was the first national referendum held in Norway, and the first in the Nordic countries. Only men could take part, and Norwegian women's organisations responded by mounting a parallel signature campaign that gathered close to 280,000 names in under three weeks, an episode widely credited with accelerating the introduction of women's suffrage in 1913.

Historians have generally accepted the result as a genuine expression of Norwegian opinion in the summer of 1905, while noting that the campaign preceding it was one-sided and at times coercive. No organised opposition existed, the press, the churches and the political parties campaigned uniformly for a "yes", and abstention or a "no" vote was widely portrayed as unpatriotic.

== Background ==
=== The consular crisis ===
Under the terms of the union, Norway and Sweden shared a common foreign service, dominated in practice by the king and the Swedish foreign minister. Norwegian demands for a separate consular service had been a recurring source of friction since the 1890s. In late 1904, the Swedish prime minister Erik Gustaf Boström proposed terms, known in Norway as the lydrikepunkter ("dependency points"), under which a Norwegian consular service would remain subordinate to Swedish foreign policy. The proposal caused widespread anger in Norway and brought down the coalition government of Francis Hagerup, opening the way for the activist ministry of Christian Michelsen, which took office on 11 March 1905 with action on the consular question as its sole programme.

On 18 and 23 May 1905, the Storting, sitting as the Odelsting and Lagting, passed a bill establishing a separate Norwegian consular service. King Oscar II refused to sanction it on 27 May. Because no Norwegian minister would countersign the refusal, the government resigned; the king declined to accept the resignations on the grounds that he could not form a replacement government.

=== The 7 June resolution ===
On 7 June, the Storting resolved that, since the king had ceased to function as King of Norway, the union had thereby been dissolved, and authorised the Michelsen government to continue in office, a step sometimes described as the decisive breakthrough for parliamentarism in Norway. The declaration provoked considerable anger in Sweden, where the press and much of the political establishment described it as a coup d'état, and where opinion objected less to dissolution itself than to Norway's unilateral method. An extraordinary session of the Riksdag opened in Stockholm on 21 June, and a committee under the conservative Christian Lundeberg took charge of the Swedish response.

=== The Swedish demand ===
On 27 July, the Riksdag resolved that a newly elected Storting or a referendum must first pronounce on the union question before Sweden would negotiate terms of dissolution. Norwegian politicians had learned of the likely demand through leaks from the Riksdag's special committee, and the Michelsen government moved first. The Storting resolved to hold a referendum before the Swedish condition was formally communicated, so that the vote would appear a Norwegian initiative rather than a concession to Stockholm. (Note: Sources differ slightly on the date of the Storting's resolution, giving either 27 or 28 July.) The historian Francis Sejersted noted the paradox that it was Sweden's ultra-conservatives who insisted on this democratic instrument.

Taking the initiative also allowed Norway to frame the question itself.

== The question ==
Under the government's proclamation of 1 August, voters entitled to vote under the constitution were asked to answer "whether they agree with the dissolution of the union that has taken place, or not" (om de er enige i den stedfundne Opløsning af Unionen eller ikke), in the Dano-Norwegian written language then in official use.

The wording was deliberate. Asking voters to ratify a dissolution already accomplished asserted the Norwegian position that the union had ended on 7 June. A straightforward "yes or no to dissolving the union" would have implied acceptance of the Swedish view that the union remained in force and could be ended only by mutual consent.

== Franchise ==
Universal manhood suffrage for men aged 25 and over had been introduced in Norway in 1898, and 435,376 men were entered on the electoral roll in 1905, about 87% of the male population aged 25 and over. The remainder were excluded chiefly because they were in receipt of poor relief, had not met the five-year residency requirement, or were not Norwegian citizens. Sweden, by contrast, did not adopt universal male suffrage until 1909.

Women had no parliamentary franchise. A limited, property-qualified municipal vote had been extended to some women in 1901.

== Campaign ==
There was no organised campaign for a "no" vote. The Michelsen government's proclamation of 1 August closed by urging Norwegians to make 13 August a "muster day of patriotism" (Fædrelandskjærlighedens Mønstringsdag), and in the days before the vote the electorate was subjected to an intensive campaign through the press, the churches, political parties and voluntary associations. Failing to vote was presented as close to a national betrayal, and voting against dissolution as tantamount to treason. Newspapers of both left and right supported the government's line.

The purpose of the exercise was as much diplomatic as domestic. Events in Norway had been widely read abroad as a revolutionary act by an extremist government and a threat to international order. A near-unanimous vote was intended to demonstrate to Sweden and to the great powers that the government had the country behind it, and that any use of force would meet united resistance.

=== Women's signature campaign ===
When it became known in late July that a referendum would be held, Fredrikke Marie Qvam, leader of the National Association for Women's Suffrage (Landskvinnestemmerettsforeningen), telegraphed the Storting on 28 July asking that women be allowed to take part. The request was refused. Women were not on the electoral register, and including them was held likely to delay a vote regarded as urgent.

Women in Østerdalen, Røros, Drammen and Trondheim began collecting signatures on their own initiative, and on 2 August the association's deputy leader Elise Welhaven Gunnerson launched a national campaign. Qvam, who together with Gina Krog had initially doubted there was enough time, joined shortly afterwards. Randi Blehr of the Norwegian Association for Women's Rights simultaneously organised a collective statement from women's associations of all kinds, coordinated by the National Council of Norwegian Women. In Drammen the collection was led by Betzy Kjelsberg.

On 13 August itself, Krog presented statements from 565 women's associations to the government. Acting prime minister Jørgen Løvland told the delegation that the conduct of Norwegian women in town and countryside was "a fine page in Norway's history" and would do much to win them the right they demanded. On 22 August the association's board delivered the individual signature lists to the President of the Storting, Carl Berner, and to the prime minister.

Figures for the total vary. Statistics Norway records that the lists handed over on 22 August contained 244,765 names, the figure cited by the Storting and by the royal court, with further lists arriving afterwards, bringing the total to either 279,878 or 278,298 depending on the source. Some men are known to have signed, and Statistics Norway suggests a figure of roughly 270,000 valid signatures. On Statistics Norway's calculation, that represents about 53% of the women who would have been eligible to vote had the franchise been equal, almost exactly the participation rate Norwegian women actually recorded at the parliamentary election of 1915, their first.

The campaign, quickly dubbed "the women's referendum" (kvinnenes folkeavstemning), was afterwards used extensively by suffrage campaigners as evidence that interest in politics extended well beyond a small female elite.

== Conduct ==
Polling generally took place in churches, decorated for the occasion with flags and often with slogans recalling the constitutional assembly of 1814. Both pre-printed and handwritten ballot papers were used. Several localities reported processions, threats and vandalism directed at people suspected of having voted no, and it was common for men previously known as supporters of the union to display their "yes" ballot openly in the polling station before placing it in the urn, which in practice compromised the secret ballot.

== Results ==
Choice	Votes	%
For	368,208	99.95
Against	184	0.05
Total	368,392	100.00
Valid votes	368,392	99.05
Invalid/blank votes	3,519	0.95
Total votes	371,911	100.00
Registered voters/turnout	435,376	85.42
Source: Nohlen & Stöver

Sources differ slightly on the totals. Nohlen and Stöver give 371,911 votes cast, of which 3,519 were rejected. Statistics Norway's historical statistics give 371,811 cast and 368,392 valid, implying 3,419 rejected ballots. Both yield a turnout of 85.4%. Turnout was far higher than at the parliamentary election of 1903 (55.5%) or that of 1906 (64.8%).

Opposition votes were scattered as individual ballots rather than concentrated in any region. Only three amter recorded more than ten votes against: Bratsberg (16), Kristians (15) and Finmarken (15). Because of its small population, Finmarken had the highest proportion of "no" votes in the country, at about 0.5%. Kristiania recorded 40 votes against, more than any other town and roughly a fifth of the national total.

== Reactions ==
In Sweden the near-unanimous result was met with some scepticism. The satirical magazine Puck depicted Norwegians marching to the ballot box with their votes on open display, supervised by national heroes led by Fridtjof Nansen.

The result nonetheless satisfied the condition the Riksdag had set, and negotiations on the terms of dissolution opened at Karlstad on 31 August.

== Aftermath ==
The Karlstad negotiations proved difficult. The principal Swedish demand was the demolition of the border fortifications built during the union conflict. The talks were suspended between 8 and 12 September and came close to collapse, with a Swedish naval force sent to Strömstad and a partial Norwegian mobilisation on 13 September. Agreement was reached on 23 September, under which the historic fortresses at Kongsvinger and Fredriksten were retained while the newer works were dismantled.

The Storting approved the Karlstad settlement on 9 October by 101 votes to 16, and the Riksdag on 13 October. On 16 October the Riksdag approved the repeal of the Act of Union and recognition of Norway as an independent state. Oscar II renounced all claim to the Norwegian throne on 26 October, the date regarded in Sweden as that of the dissolution.

A second referendum on 12 and 13 November approved the Storting's proposal to offer the throne to Prince Carl of Denmark by 259,563 votes to 69,364, on a lower turnout of 75.3%. The Storting elected him king on 18 November, and he took the name Haakon VII, swearing his oath to the constitution on 27 November.

== Assessment ==
The vote is generally treated as an accurate reflection of Norwegian opinion in the summer of 1905, when older domestic disagreements about the value of the union were set aside in favour of national unity behind Michelsen's policy. Historians have nonetheless drawn attention to the conditions in which it was held. Bjørn Arne Steine observes that results of this kind are now rarely seen outside tightly controlled dictatorships, and that popular will "had been helped to find its strength".

The exclusion of women gave the referendum a second and unintended significance. The scale of the signature campaign undermined the argument that political engagement among Norwegian women was confined to a small elite, and is regarded as having materially advanced the case for suffrage, granted in 1913, making Norway the first sovereign state to introduce universal female suffrage for parliamentary elections.

== See also ==
- Dissolution of the union between Norway and Sweden
- 1905 Norwegian monarchy referendum
