= Søren Andreas Christophersen =

Norwegian diplomat

Søren Andreas "Don Andrés" Christophersen (July 6, 1849 – 1933) was a Norwegian diplomat that served in Argentina for nearly four decades.

== Early life and family ==
Christophersen was born in Tønsberg, Norway. He was one of the sons of the customs official Ole Christophersen (1796–1878) and his wife Tobine Christine Petersen (1806–83). His brothers included Norwegian Foreign Minister Wilhelm Christopher Christophersen (1832–1913), Danish general consul in Montevideo Otto Thorvald Alexander Christophersen (1834–1896), Oslo wholesaler and factory owner Christian Eilert Rasch Christophersen (1840–1900), and Norwegian businessman, landowner, and diplomat in Argentina Peter Christophersen (1845-1930).

== Career ==
Wilhelm Christopher Christophersen went to Buenos Aires in 1867 and inspired four of his brothers to follow. After graduating from the civil school in Tønsberg, Søren Christophersen also went to Buenos Aires, where he became the Norwegian-Swedish vice consul in 1871 and the acting consul in 1874. After Wilhelm relocated to Leith, Scotland, Søren Andreas became general consul in 1879. In 1900 he married Sara Lynch (born 1863), who was the daughter of a local landowner. After the dissolution of the union between Norway and Sweden, in 1906 he became the unpaid Norwegian envoy to Buenos Aires, serving until 1916. From 1908 to 1910, he served in this capacity under his brother Wilhelm, who was made foreign minister. He received the grand cross of the Order of St. Olav. Christophersen died in 1933.
