= Fritz Hansen =

Fritz Hansen may refer to:

- Fritz Hansen (officer) (1855–1921), Danish lieutenant colonel and president of the Danish Sports Confederation
- Fritz Hansen (company), Danish furniture design company

== See also ==
- Frits Hansen (1841–1911), Norwegian educator, newspaper editor, biographer, and politician.
- Fritz Hanson (1914–1996), Canadian football player
