= 1905 Norwegian monarchy referendum =

1905 popular vote on Prince Carl of Denmark's ascension to the Norwegian throne

- 12–13 November 1905
- Do you agree with the Storting's authorization to the government to invite Prince Carl of Denmark to become King of Norway?

Results
Choice	Votes	%
Yes	259,563	78.94%
No	69,264	21.06%
Valid votes	328,827	99.27%
Invalid or blank votes	2,403	0.73%
Total votes	331,230	100.00%
Registered voters/turnout	439,748	75.32%
Yes
50%-60%
60%-70%
70%-80%
80%-90%
>90%

A referendum regarding the choice of the new monarch was held in Norway on 12 and 13 November 1905. Voters were asked whether they approved of the Storting's decision to authorise the government to make the offer of the throne of the newly self-ruling country. The Storting had wanted to offer the throne to Prince Carl of Denmark, but the prince insisted that the Norwegian people had a choice to decide if they wanted him to be the future King or not.

The proposal was approved by 79% of voters. Following the referendum, the Storting formally offered the throne to Carl on 18 November; Carl accepted, assuming the throne as King Haakon VII. The new royal family arrived in Norway on 25 November. King Haakon and Queen Maud were crowned in a ceremony in Nidaros Cathedral in Trondheim on 22 June 1906. Haakon became Norway's first separate monarch in 518 years.

== Summary ==
On 7 June 1905 the Storting approved the dissolution of the union with Sweden; as a result, Swedish King Oscar II abdicated as King of Norway. He refused the reconciliation offer to allow a Swedish prince to take the Norwegian throne.

The Storting thus turned to the Danish Prince Carl. In addition to the positive personal qualities, it was pointed out that he was Scandinavian and would understand the Norwegian language and culture.

He was the second son of Crown Prince Frederik and Louise of Sweden, the only surviving child of Oscar's older brother Charles XV and, before the birth of Oscar's sons, a serious contender as heir to the dissolved union. Frederick's brother had also been similarly invited to become a monarch of another nation as George I of Greece.

Carl's wife Princess Maud was Edward VII's daughter, so he had close ties to the United Kingdom and the British royal family, and an heir-apparent to the throne was already guaranteed through his son, the two-year-old Prince Alexander.

In Norway, it was debated whether the country should remain a monarchy or become a republic. Prince Carl demanded that the issue should be submitted to a referendum, as he wanted an assurance that a majority of the population wanted Norway to remain as a monarchy.

The question posed was:

Enig i Stortingets bemyndigelse til regjeringen om at opfordre prins Carl af Danmark til at lade sig vælge til Norges konge?

[Do you agree with the Storting's authorization to the government to invite Prince Carl of Denmark to become King of Norway?]

A majority voted in favour of monarchy, and on 18 November the Parliament formally elected Prince Carl as king. The Speaker of Parliament sent him a telegram offering him the throne of Norway.

The prince accepted the election, and on 25 November 1905 the new Norwegian royal family landed at Vippetangen in Christiania (Oslo). He took the name Haakon and gave his son Alexander the name Olav, names that linked the new royal house to the Norwegian kings from the Middle Ages, specifically fellow father-son Haakon VI and Olaf IV, who were the last monarchs before the Kalmar Union. On 22 June 1906, King Haakon VII and Queen Maud were crowned in Nidaros Cathedral in Trondheim.

== Results ==
Choice	Votes	%
For	259,563	78.94
Against	69,264	21.06
Total	328,827	100.00
Valid votes	328,827	99.27
Invalid/blank votes	2,403	0.73
Total votes	331,230	100.00
Registered voters/turnout	439,748	75.32
Source: Nohlen & Stöver

== See also ==
- Dissolution of the union between Norway and Sweden
- 1905 Norwegian union dissolution referendum
