= Framgang =

Norwegian newspaper

Framgang (meaning "Progress" in English) was a Norwegian newspaper, published in Lillehammer in Oppland county.

== History and profile ==
Framgang was started in 1886 as a Liberal organ for people affiliated with Vonheim Folk High School. Editors-in-chief were Johan Filseth and Matias Skard. Skard left Vonheim in 1890, and Filseth became the sole editor. By 1893, he had fallen into conflict with the people of Vonheim, and he left to found his own newspaper Gudbrandsdølen. Framgang continued publication until 1896.

In Dec 1894 the Framgang become a newspaper for the Moderate Liberal Party and Centre.
