= Mogens Thorsen =

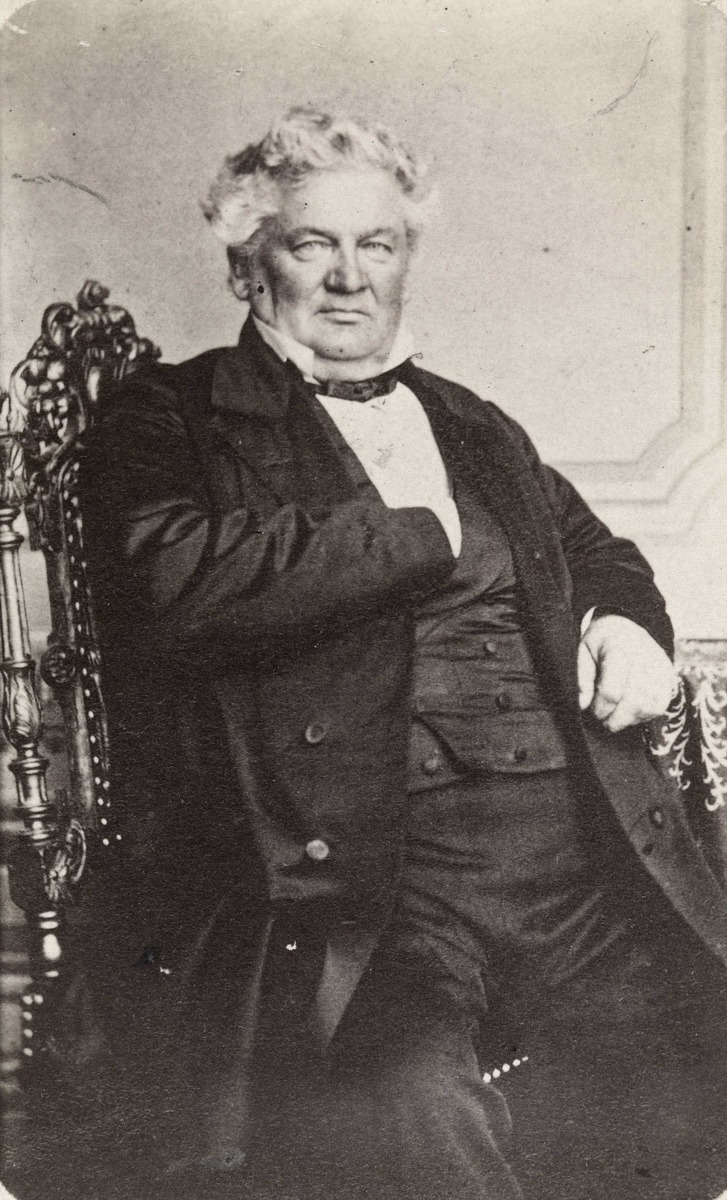
Mogens Thorsen

Mogens Thorsen (30 August 1790 – 29 April 1863) was a Norwegian shipowner and philanthropist.

Thorsen was born in Christiania (now Oslo), Norway. He was the son of Ole Balle Thorsen (1744–1826) and Anna Knudsdatter Schmidt (1757–1832). His father was a merchant and operated a shipping crew in Christiania. Thorsen worked as a skipper until the mid-1830s, at which time he started his own shipping company. He distinguished himself from his competition by investing in large ships and with time became the largest shipowner in Christiania.

In 1826, he married Elsbetha (Betha) Heftye (1807–88) who was the sister of banker Johannes Thomassen Heftye (1792–1856) and wholesaler Henrik Heftye (1804–1864).

Mogens Thorsen is known for the endowment Mogens Thorsens og Hustrus Stiftelse, established by Thorsen and his wife Bertha under the terms of their will in 1894. The foundation functioned with the purpose of providing lodgings for widows or unmarried women. Today, the foundation continues to provide apartments for single women at a location on Niels Juels gate in Oslo.
