= Centre (political party) =

Defunct political party in Norway

Centre Centrum
- Leader: Frits Hansen
- Founded: 1893
- Dissolved: 1903
- Split from: Liberal Party
- Merged into: Coalition Party
- Newspaper: Framgang (from 1894); Eidsvold
- Ideology: Social conservatism Agrarian protectionism Pietistic orthodoxy Unionism
- Political position: Centre

Centre (Norwegian: Centrum) was a political party in Norway founded in 1893 and led by Frits Hansen. It positioned itself as a moderate middle party between the Conservative Party and the radical Liberal Party.

== History ==
Centre was founded by eastern moderates who had been politically homeless since the 1888 Liberal split, and it was often characterised as the Eastern Norway parallel to the Moderate Liberal Party (based in the south-west). While informally known as the "Moderate Party of Eastern Norway", it remained an independent party-organisation despite talks of a possible merger. Their common goal was to work against the Liberals' policy of challenging the union with Sweden, expanding voting rights, and taxes.

Presenting itself as a rural agrarian party with its base among farmers, Centre largely adopted the protectionist program of the Norwegian Agrarian Association from 1895/96. The party was otherwise ideologically closely connected to the conservative Christian section of the folk high school movement. Along with Frits Hansen, an educator himself, another co-founder was the priest and fellow educator Christopher Bruun. In elections the party cooperated with the Conservative Party. After declining support, some members joined the Conservative Party around 1900; further, when the Coalition Party was formed in 1903, Centre was absorbed into the alliance.

== Leaders ==
Party chairman

- Frits Hansen

Members of the hovedstyret (as of 28. June 1894)

- 1. Otto Benjamin Andreas Aubert
- 2. Oscar Jacobsen
- 3. Gaardbruger Jul. Sundby
- 4. Fhv stortingsmand M anders
- 5. Ole Ringnes
- 6. Dr. Løvig, Sigdal.
- 7. Skolebestyrer Voss, Kristiania
- 8. Fhv Storthingsmand A. Huser, Rødenæs.
- 9. Overretssagf. Bernh. Sollie, Horten
- 10. Professor Vogt, Kristiania.

Supplements to the hovedstyret

- 1. Advokat Rasch, Kristiania.
- 2. Gaardbr. Fremming, Minne
- 3. Gaardbruger S. Næss, Seljord
- 4. Gaardbruger Finstad, Ski.
- 5. Konsul C. Wiel-gedde, Fredrikshald

General Secretaries

- Unknown

=== Party Congresses ===
- 1. landsmøte February 10 1893
- ?. landsmøte 1894
- ?. landsmøte 1896 February 9

== Election results ==
Date	Votes	Seats		Size	Notes
Date	%	#	±	Size	Notes
1894	???%	4 / 114	▲4	4rd	

- *Indicates shared vote between the Moderate Liberals and Conservatives. Seats indicated are the Moderate Liberals alone.
