= Alfred Berglund (admiral) =

Norwegian admiral

Alfred Berglund (1862 – 1945) was a Norwegian admiral.

He was born in Christiania. He was the Chief of the Admiral Staff from 1910, reached the rank of rear admiral in 1919, and served as the Commanding Admiral of Norway from 1919 to 1930.

Military offices
Preceded by Karl Friedrich Griffin Dawes	Commanding Admiral in Norway; 1919–1930	Succeeded by Jakob von der Lippe
