= August Geelmuyden Spørck =

Norwegian politician (1851–1928)

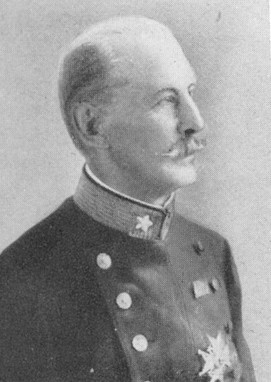

Minister of Defence
- In office 20 August 1909 – 2 February 1910
- Prime Minister: Gunnar Knudsen
- Preceded by: Haakon D. Lowzow
- Succeeded by: Karl Bull

Member of the Norwegian Parliament
- In office 1 January 1901 – 31 December 1903
- Constituency: Trondhjem and Levanger

Personal details
- Born: 13 September 1851 Christiania, United Kingdoms of Sweden and Norway
- Died: 14 July 1928 (aged 76) Vestre Aker, Oslo, Norway
- Party: Liberal
- Spouse: Marie Amunda Jenssen (m. 1880)
- Children: Gunnar Spøck

Military service
- Allegiance: Norway
- Branch/service: Norwegian Army
- Years of service: 1872–1919
- Rank: Major General

August Geelmuyden Spørck (13 September 1851 – 14 July 1928) was a Norwegian military officer and politician for the Liberal Party. He is best known as the Norwegian Minister of Defence from 1909 to 1910.

== Career ==
He was born in Kristiania. He became a military officer in 1872. Through the rifle associations he became affiliated with the Liberal Party. He was elected to the Parliament of Norway in 1900, representing the constituency of Trondhjem og Levanger. He held the rank of Captain at that time. He served only one term, but had previously served as a deputy representative during the term 1898–1900. On 20 August 1909, he was appointed as the new Minister of Defence in the first cabinet Knudsen. He held this position until 1 February 1910, when the cabinet resigned. In 1914 he was promoted to Major General, and from 1916 to 1919 he was the Inspector-General of the Infantry. He died in July 1928.

== Personal life ==
His granddaughter Mimi Reimers married Olaf D. Thommessen.

Political offices
Preceded by Haakon Ditlev Lowzow	Norwegian Minister of Defence; 1909–1910	Succeeded by Karl Sigwald Johannes Bull
