= Haakon Ditlev Lowzow =

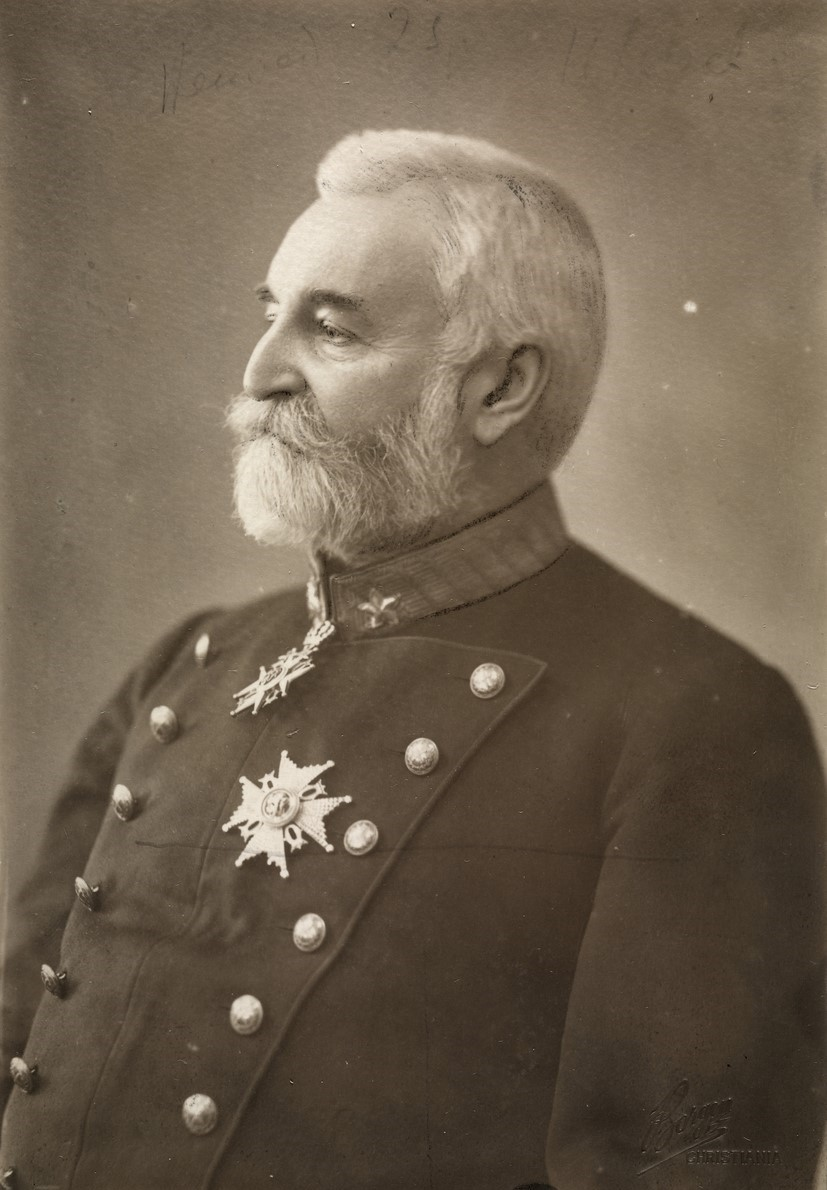

Minister of Defence
- In office 11 April 1908 – 20 August 1909
- Prime Minister: Gunnar Knudsen
- Preceded by: Thomas Heftye
- Succeeded by: August Spørck

Personal details
- Born: 5 October 1854 Løten, Hedmark, United Kingdoms of Sweden and Norway
- Died: 12 August 1915 (aged 60) Christiania, Norway
- Party: Liberal
- Spouse: Bolette Sophie Lowzow

Military service
- Allegiance: Norway
- Branch/service: Norwegian Army
- Years of service: 1872–1915
- Rank: Inspector-General of the Infantry

Haakon Ditlev Lowzow (5 October 1854 – 12 August 1915) was a Norwegian military officer and politician for the Liberal Party. He is best known as the Norwegian Minister of Defence from 1908 to 1909.

== Personal life ==
Lowzow was born in Kristiania, and came from a military background. His father was a lieutenant, his grandfather was a major general and his great-grandfather was a lieutenant general. Also, he was a granduncle of Carl Fredrik and Wenche Lowzow.

== Career ==
He became a military officer in 1872, and was promoted to premier lieutenant in 1887 and lieutenant colonel in 1904. On 11 April 1908, when the first cabinet Knudsen assumed office, he was appointed as the new Minister of Defence. He held this position until 19 August 1909, when he resigned. He later became major general of rank and Inspector-General of the Infantry. He died in August 1915.

Political offices
Preceded by Thomas Heftye	Norwegian Minister of Defence; 1908–1909	Succeeded by August Geelmuyden Spørck
