= Løvland's Cabinet =

Government of Norway from 1907 to 1908

- Cabinet of Norway

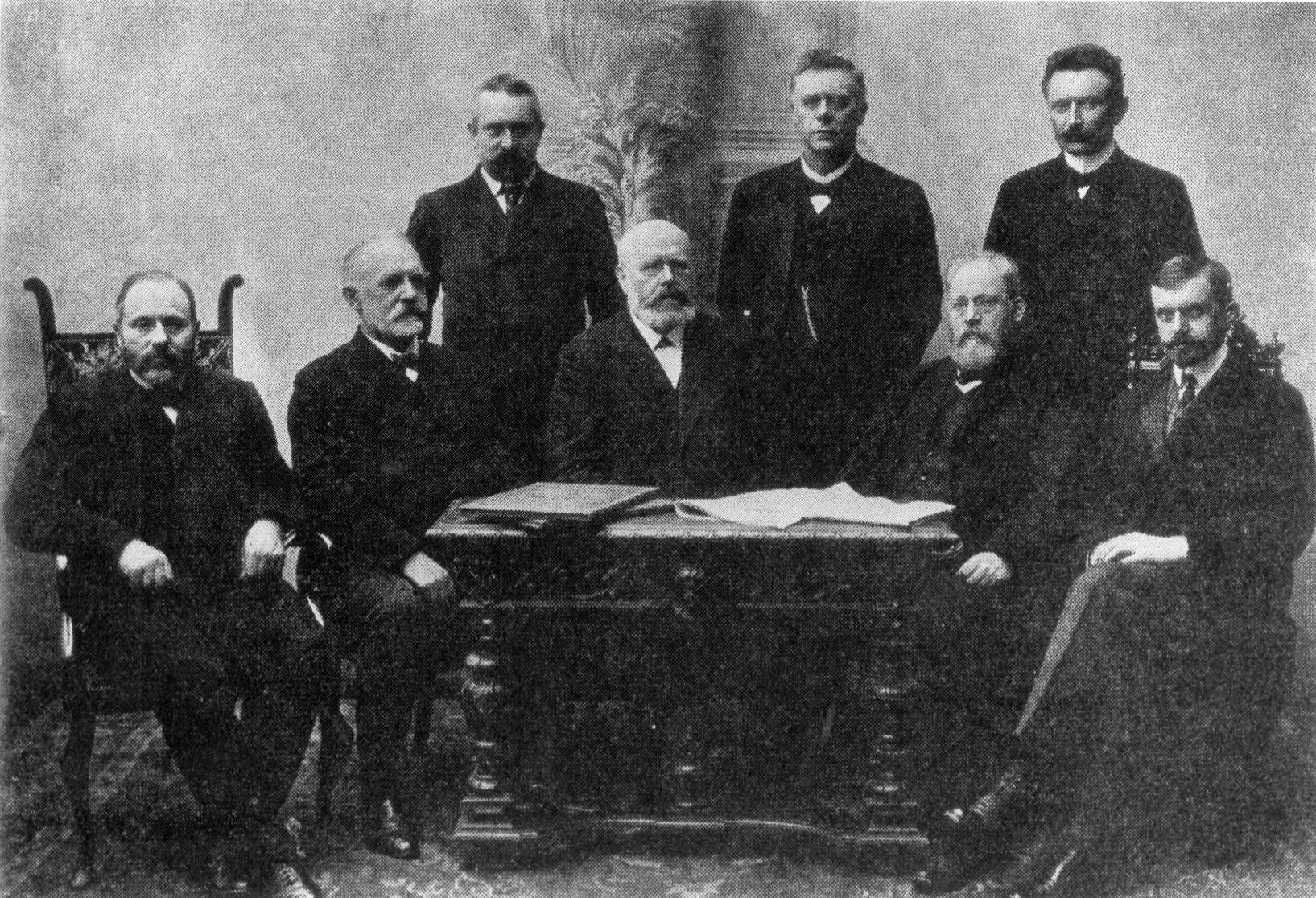
- From left to tight: Sven Aarrestad, Sofus Arctander, Karl F. Griffin Dawes, Prime Minister Løvland, Magnus Halvorsen, Abraham Berge, Johan Bredal and Jørgen Brunchorst
- Date formed: 23 October 1907
- Date dissolved: 19 March 1908

People and organisations
- Head of state: Haakon VII of Norway
- Head of government: Jørgen Løvland
- No. of ministers: 9
- Member party: Liberal Party
- Status in legislature: Majority government

History
- Election: 1906
- Legislature term: 1907–1908
- Predecessor: Michelsen's Cabinet
- Successor: Knudsen's First Cabinet

Løvland's cabinet was the government of Norway between 23 October 1907 and 19 March 1908. The cabinet was led by Prime Minister Jørgen Løvland of the Liberal Party and consisted of nine ministers, mostly from the Liberal Party, one from the Moderate Liberal Party and two independents. During the State Council on 14 March 1908, Prime Minister Løvland asked to resign after cabinet had got a negative majority against it for the debate on the speech of the Throne. The resignation was accepted by King Haakon VII during the State Council on 18 March and took effect the day after at 10:30am. The first cabinet of Gunnar Knudsen was then appointed with immediate effect at the same time stamp.

== Cabinet members ==
The cabinet was intact through Løvland's entire term. Three ministers, Arctander, Aarrestad and Brunchorst, were retained from Michelsen's cabinet.

Cabinet
Portfolio	Minister	Took office	Left office	Party
Prime Minister; Minister of Foreign Affairs	Jørgen Løvland	23 October 1907	19 March 1908	Liberal
Minister of Justice and the Police	Johan Bredal	23 October 1907	19 March 1908	Independent
Minister of Finance and Customs	Magnus Halvorsen	23 October 1907	19 March 1908	Liberal
Minister of Defence	Karl F. Griffin Dawes	23 October 1907	19 March 1908	Liberal
Minister of Agriculture; Minister of Auditing	Sven Aarrestad	23 October 1907	19 March 1908	Liberal
Minister of Education and Church Affairs	Abraham Berge	23 October 1907	19 March 1908	Liberal
Minister of Trade	Sofus Arctander	23 October 1907	19 March 1908	Liberal
Minister of Labour	Jørgen Brunchorst	23 October 1907	19 March 1908	Independent
