= Kristiansand Teacher Training College =

University in Kristiansand, Norway

Coordinates: 58°36′25″N 8°52′14″E

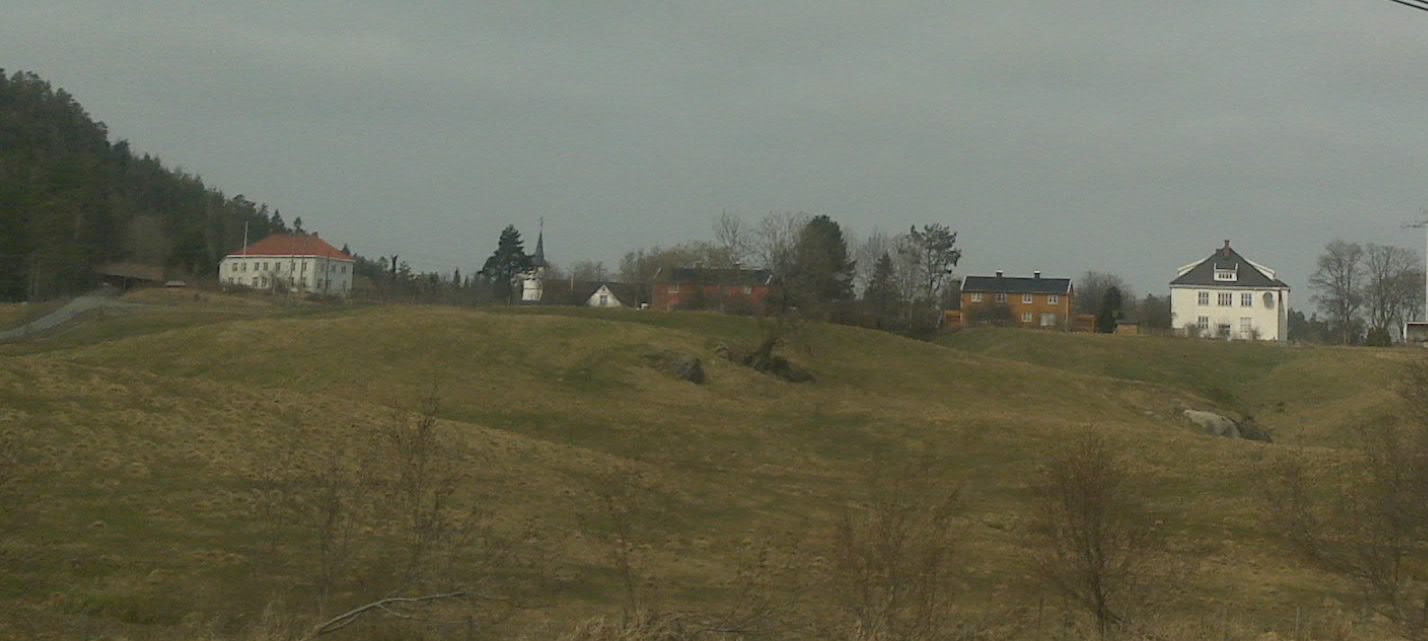
Campus of Holt Seminary

Kristiansand Teacher Training College (Kristiansand Lærerhøgskole) was established as Holt Seminary at Holt Municipality, Norway in 1839. The first teachers' college was located at the parsonage at Holt Church. While located in Holt, the seminary graduated 445 students, among whom were Jørgen Løvland (1848 –1922) during 1865 and Arne Garborg (1851–1924) from 1868 to 1870.

The seminary moved to Kristiansand in 1877, and was renamed Kristiansand Teachers' College in 1902. The school was named Kristiansand Teacher Training College in 1977. Southern kindergarten teacher education, established in 1963, was incorporated into the teachers' academy in 1973. In 1994, Kristiansand Lærerhøgskole became part of the University of Agder.
