= Knudsen's First Cabinet =

Government of Norway from 1908 to 1910

- Cabinet of Norway

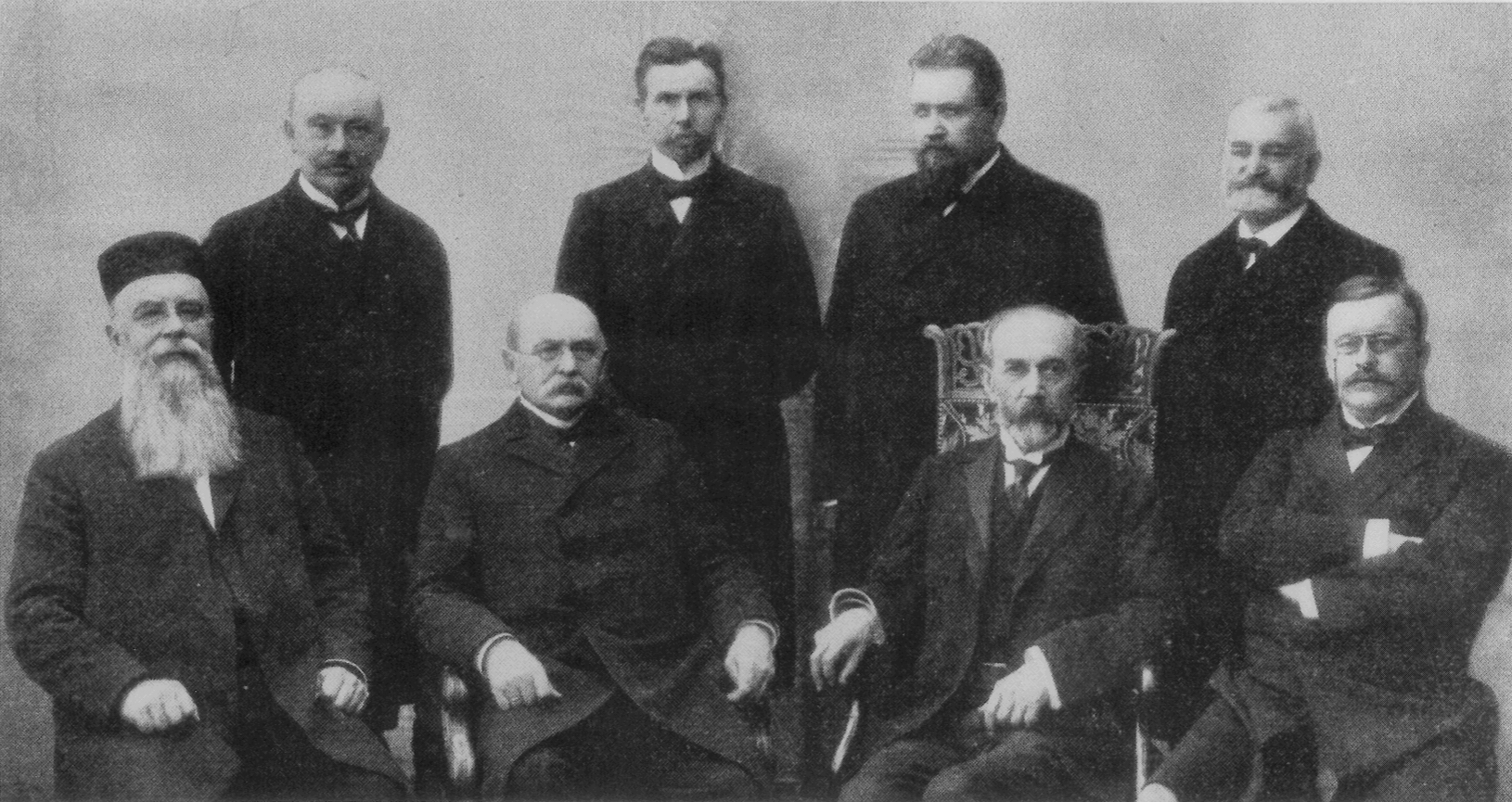
- From left to tight: Karl Seip, Nils Claus Ihlen, Prime Minister Knudsen, Lars Abrahamsen, Hans Konrad Foosnæs, Wilhelm Christophersen, Haakon D. Lowzow and Johan Castberg
- Date formed: 19 March 1908
- Date dissolved: 2 February 1910

People and organisations
- Head of state: Haakon VII of Norway
- Head of government: Gunnar Knudsen
- No. of ministers: 9
- Member party: Liberal Party; Radical People's Party
- Status in legislature: Coalition Minority government

History
- Outgoing formation: 1909 parliamentary election
- Outgoing election: 1909 parliamentary election
- Legislature term: 1907–1910
- Predecessor: Løvland's Cabinet
- Successor: Konow's Cabinet

Knudsen's First Cabinet governed Norway between 19 March 1908 and 2 February 1910. It had the following composition:

== Cabinet members ==
Cabinet
Portfolio	Minister	Took office	Left office	Party
Prime Minister; Minister of Finance; Minister of Auditing	Gunnar Knudsen	19 March 1908	2 February 1910	Liberal
Minister of Foreign Affairs	Wilhelm Christophersen	19 March 1908	2 February 1910	Liberal
Minister of Justice and the Police	Johan Castberg	19 March 1908	2 February 1910	Radical People's
Minister of Defence	Thomas Heftye	19 March 1908	11 April 1908	Liberal
Minister of Defence	Haakon D. Lowzow	11 April 1908	20 August 1909	Liberal
Minister of Defence	August Spørck	20 August 1909	2 February 1910	Liberal
Minister of Agriculture	Hans Konrad Foosnæs	19 March 1908	2 February 1910	Liberal
Minister of Education and Church Affairs	Karl Seip	19 March 1908	16 September 1909 (Note: Seip was on leave from 8 July until his death.)	Liberal
Minister of Education and Church Affairs	Johannes Hougen	18 September 1909 (Note: Hougen was acting minister from 8 July to 16 September, but was officially appointed by the King on 18 September.)	2 February 1910	Liberal
Minister of Trade	Lars Abrahamsen	19 March 1908	2 February 1910	Liberal
Minister of Labour	Nils Claus Ihlen	19 March 1908	2 February 1910	Liberal

== State Secretary ==
Not to be confused with the modern title State Secretary. The old title State Secretary, used between 1814 and 1925, is now known as Secretary to the Government (Regjeringsråd).

- Nils Otto Hesselberg
