= Thomas Heftye =

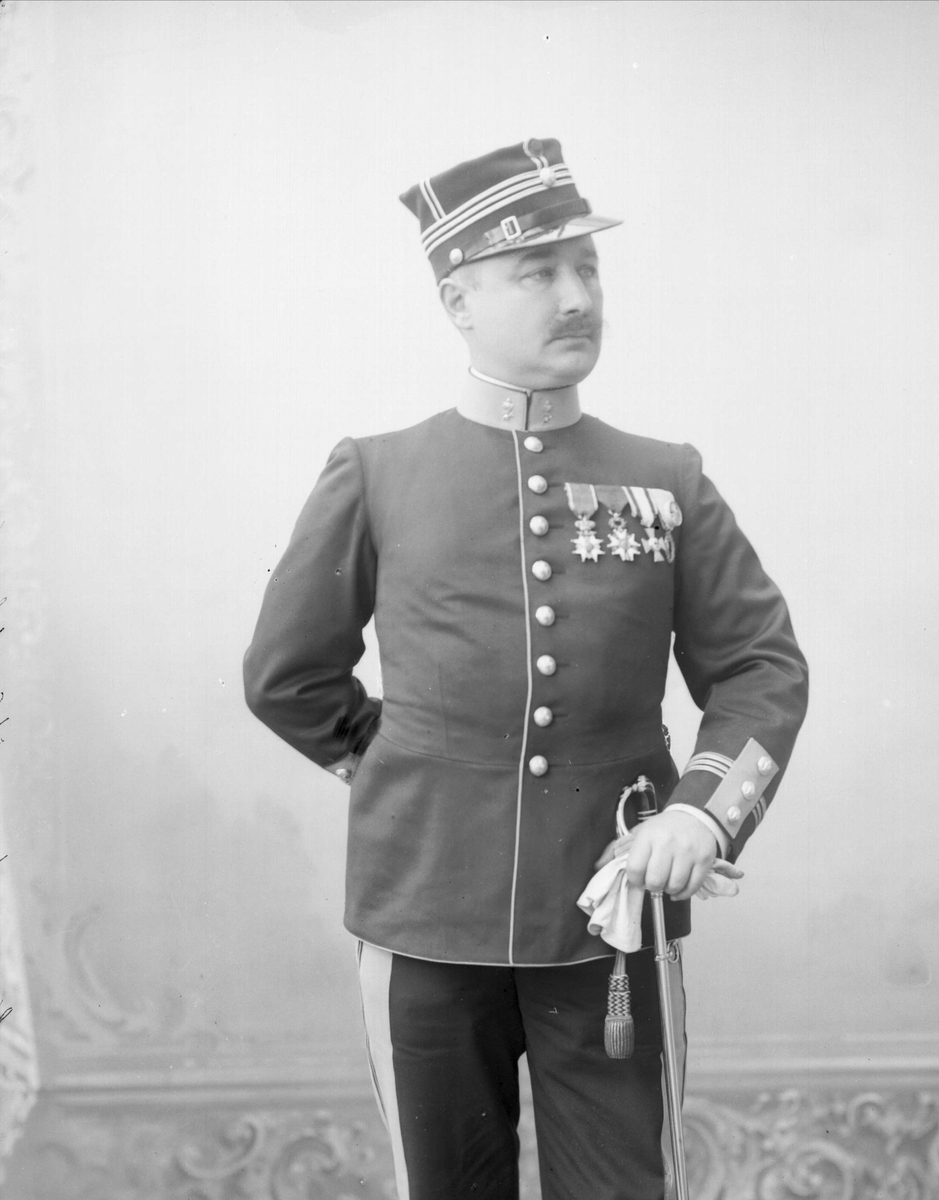
- Heftye in or around 1900.

Minister of Defence
- In office 19 March 1908 – 11 April 1908
- Prime Minister: Gunnar Knudsen
- Preceded by: Karl F. Griffin Dawes
- Succeeded by: Haakon D. Lowzow
- In office 9 June 1903 – 22 October 1903
- Prime Minister: Otto Blehr
- Preceded by: Georg Stang
- Succeeded by: Oscar Strugstad

Personal details
- Born: Thomas Thomassen Heftye; 10 April 1860 Vestre Aker, United Kingdoms of Sweden and Norway
- Died: 19 September 1921 (aged 61) Trondhjem, Sør-Trøndelag, Norway
- Party: Liberal
- Spouse: Marie Berghaus
- Relations: Thomas Johannessen Heftye (father); Johannes Thomassen Heftye (grandfather); Henrik Heftye (granduncle)
- Children: 1
- Education: Norwegian Military Academy
- Occupation: Military officer Engineer, telegrapher Sports official Arbitrator

Thomas Thomassen Heftye (10 April 1860 – 19 September 1921) was a Norwegian military officer, engineer, sports official and politician for the Liberal Party. He is best known as the Norwegian Minister of Defence from June to October 1903 and March to April 1908, as well as the director of Telegrafverket. He was killed in the Nidareid train disaster.

== Personal life ==
He was born in Vestre Aker as the son of banker Thomas Johannessen Heftye (1822–1886) and his wife Marie Jacobine Meyer (1826–1895). He was a grandson of banker and politician Johannes Thomassen Heftye. His great-grandfather migrated to Norway from Hätzingen, Switzerland in the late eighteenth century, and founded the family company Thos. Joh. Heftye & Søn. He was also a grandnephew of Henrik Thomassen Heftye. In May 1888 he married Marie Berghaus (1869–1931).

== Career ==
Heftye finished his secondary education in 1878, and took a military education in the following years. From 1880 he worked in the family company Thos. Joh. Heftye & Søn, but in 1885 he returned to the military, enrolling at the Norwegian Military Academy. In 1892 he took education as a telegrapher, and started working in the Norwegian Army engineer department instead of in the infantry. He also became involved in local politics in his native Aker municipality. He belonged to the Liberal Party, and was regarded as being on their radical wing.

From 1900 to 1902 he served in Paris as military attaché of Sweden and Norway. On 9 June 1903 he was appointed as Minister of Defence as a part of the Blehr's First Cabinet. He held this position until 21 October 1903, when the cabinet fell. In the same year he was promoted to lieutenant colonel. He was assigned to work as a military consultant at the Council of State Division in Stockholm. He would provide valuable information in the buildup for the dissolution of the union between Norway and Sweden in 1905, which the Liberal Party supported. In 1905, then, he was made director of Telegrafverket, running the state monopoly on telegraph services. Telegrafverket is considered a predecessor of today's telecommunications company Telenor.

In 1906, Akashi Motojirō described Heftye as an "old friend".

Heftye served one term in Kristiania city council, from 1907 to 1910. On 19 March 1908, when the Knudsen's First Cabinet assumed office, he was appointed for his second term as Minister of Defence. He resigned already on 10 April the same year, because Prime Minister Gunnar Knudsen refused to seek a vote of confidence in Parliament, a form of investiture. This was a problematic question at that time, as Norway had made important steps towards parliamentarism, but not formalized the process with change of government. Former Prime Minister Christian Michelsen had asked for a vote of confidence following the 1906 general election, and survived. When he retired from politics in 1907 due to illness, Jørgen Løvland took over, but his cabinet was toppled in 1908. Earlier the same year, the Liberal Party had evicted 24 legislators who supported Christian Michelsen and the endeavors of the Coalition Party (later leading to the creation of the Liberal Left Party), and hence, when Knudsen took over, he had no way of achieving a parliamentary majority. In that situation he could not expect to survive a vote of confidence. On the other hand, Knudsen and his cabinet resigned following the 1909 general election, which the Liberal Party lost. Such an action is not required by law, but if not carried through, the cabinet would most likely face a vote of no confidence.

Despite the disagreement in 1908, Heftye and Knudsen were not estranged. Knudsen would later sit as Prime Minister from 1913 to 1920, and he used Heftye as an arbitrator in both the national wages board and in irregular labour conflicts. Previously, during his time as telegraph director, Heftye had started the institution of non-legal wiretapping—a method which was later used in labour conflicts. He was also an international arbitrator from 1919 to 1920 when he sat on the Slesvig Commission, preparing the partition into Northern and Southern Slesvig in 1920.

Heftye was also involved in sports. He was a member of the Norwegian Olympic Committee at the 1906 and 1908 Summer Olympics. He was also Norway's member of the International Olympic Committee from 1907 to 1908. He also chaired the Landsforeningen for Reiselivet from 1912 to 1918 and the Norwegian Trekking Association from 1918 to 1921.

== Death ==
The Dovre Railway Line was officially opened in September 1921. On 19 September 1921, tragedy struck as two trains collided right outside the Nidareid tunnel in Trondhjem. Heftye was killed together with architect Erik Glosimodt and several others.

== Awards and legacy ==
Heftye was decorated with as a Knight, First Class of the Royal Norwegian Order of St. Olav in 1903. He was upgraded to Commander, First Class in 1912 and received the Grand Cross in 1915. He was also a Commander of the Danish Order of the Dannebrog, a Knight of the French Légion d'honneur as well as other foreign orders of knighthood.

Political offices
Preceded by Hans Georg Jacob Stang	Norwegian Minister of Defence; June 1903–October 1903	Succeeded by Oscar Sigvald Julius Strugstad
Preceded by Karl Friedrich Griffin Dawes	Norwegian Minister of Defence; March 1908–April 1908	Succeeded by Haakon Ditlev Lowzow
Sporting positions
Preceded by Henrik Angell	Norway's member of the International Olympic Committee; 1907–1908	Succeeded by Johan Sverre
