= Wilhelm Christopher Christophersen =

Norwegian diplomat (1832–1913)

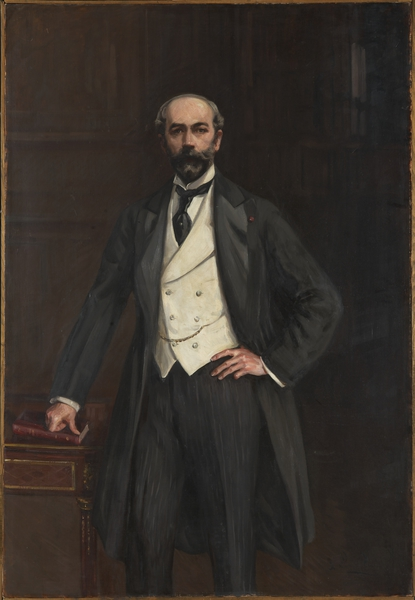

Minister of Foreign Affairs
- In office 19 March 1908 – 2 February 1910
- Prime Minister: Gunnar Knudsen
- Preceded by: Jørgen Løvland
- Succeeded by: Johannes Irgens

Personal details
- Born: Wilhelm Christopher Christophersen; 15 December 1832 Brevik, Telemark, United Kingdoms of Sweden and Norway
- Died: 26 July 1913 (aged 80) Kristiania, Norway
- Party: Liberal
- Spouse: Berta Juhlin-Dannfelt (m. 1876)
- Children: 1
- Parent(s): Ole C. Christophersen (1794–1882); Tobine Christine Petersen (1806–1883)
- Education: Law
- Alma mater: University of Oslo
- Occupation: Diplomat

Wilhelm Christopher Christophersen (15 December 1832 – 26 July 1913) was a Norwegian diplomat, noted for his contributions in facilitating the dissolution of the union between Norway and Sweden in 1905 and later his service as Minister of Foreign Affairs.

== Biography ==
Wilhelm Christophersen was born at Brevik in Telemark, Norway. The son of a customs official in the town, he was a brother of Christian Christophersen and Peter Christophersen and the grand-uncle of Erling Christophersen. In June 1876, he married Swedish citizen Berta Alexandra Juliane Carola Juhlin-Dannfelt (1856–1943).

He earned his examen artium in 1850. After a brief career as a private tutor in the Netherlands, Christophersen entered the study of law at the Royal Frederick University (now the University of Oslo) in 1853, graduating in 1857. He worked as a language teacher to finance his education.

From 1857 he worked in the Ministry of Auditing, but in 1859 his language skills got him an assignment within the Ministry of the Interior's office for trade and consular affairs. In 1864 he was transferred to the Swedish-Norwegian foreign service. He served as consul in Barcelona from 1864 and in Buenos Aires from 1868 to 1870, and then as consul-general in the same city until 1878. Having secured this position, he was stationed in Paris; Leith, Scotland; and Antwerp. Upon the dissolution of the union between Norway and Sweden in 1905, he stayed in Antwerp in the same position, only for the Norwegian government.

In March 1908, he was appointed as Minister of Foreign Affairs in the first cabinet of Gunnar Knudsen, where he served until February 1910, when the cabinet resigned.

== Legacy ==
As a professional within the field of Swedish-Norwegian foreign affairs, Christophersen's career was limited by his lack of family connections and financial resources. As he had served on the commission to study a separate consular corps for Norway, as well as other committees on the topic, he fell out of Oscar II's good graces. As consul, he had several notable accomplishments:

- In 1884–85, acting as the ad hoc plenipotentiary emissary in Mexico for Sweden-Norway, he had secured the release of a Norwegian ship and negotiated a trade agreement between Mexico and the kingdom he represented.
- He also negotiated trade agreements limited to Norway (and not Sweden) with Spain in 1893 and Switzerland in 1894.

As foreign minister, his in-depth knowledge and field experience with consular affairs made him particularly suited to build a foreign service organization to serve Norwegian economic interests. He also worked to reconcile relations between Norway and Sweden. His wife was Swedish, the daughter of a Swedish diplomat. He accepted the position as foreign minister on the condition that he was able to return to his post as consul general in Antwerp. Instead, he was awarded an adequate pension and remained in Norway.

Political offices
| Preceded by Jørgen Løvland | Norwegian Minister of Foreign Affairs; 1908–1910 | Succeeded by Johannes Irgens |
