= Thomas Johannessen Heftye =

Norwegian politician

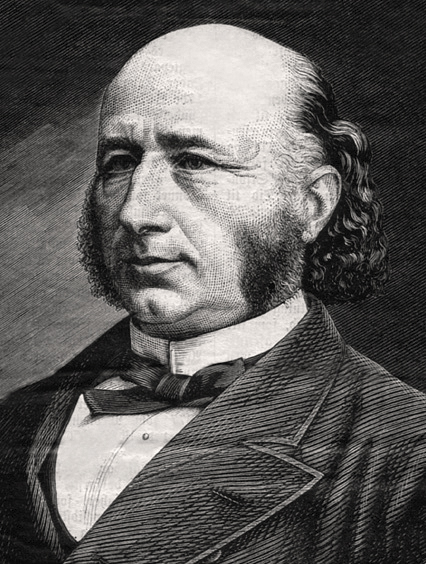
Thomas Heftye (1879)

Thomas Johannessen Heftye, also known as Tho Joh Heftye (29 October 1822 – 4 October 1886) was a Norwegian businessman, politician and philanthropist.

== Personal life ==
He was born in Christiania as the son of merchant Johannes Thomassen Heftye (1792–1856) Tina Haslef (1798–1862). He was a nephew of Henrik Heftye.

In October 1846 he married Marie Jacobine Meyer (1826–1895), a daughter of Jacob Peter Meyer and sister of Thorvald Meyer. Their son Thomas Heftye became a notable politician. Through his daughter Ingeborg Marie he was a father-in-law of Frits Hansen and grandfather of Eilif Fougner.

== Career ==
His grandfather migrated to Norway from Switzerland in the late eighteenth century, and founded the family company Thos. Joh. Heftye & Søn. Heftye grew up at Filipstad. He took his secondary education at Oslo Cathedral School and his higher education mainly in Leipzig. He entered the family company in 1848.

Heftye was heavily involved in the organizational life of the time. He co-founded the Norwegian Trekking Association in 1868. He owned the rural areas Sarabråten, Frognerseteren and Tryvannshøyden. Already in his lifetime these were opened as recreational areas; the two latter areas later became publicly owned. He was also a member of the board of Akers Sparebank from 1873 to his death, and also of Norges Forsvarsforening, Christiania Theatre, the Society for the Preservation of Ancient Norwegian Monuments and Christiania Kunstforening. He was a known patron of the arts, and financed the publication of the diaries of Claus Pavels. He also financed writers and artists such as Aasmund Olavson Vinje, Bjørnstjerne Bjørnson, Hans Gude and P. A. Munch.

He was also involved in politics. He was a member of Christiania city council from 1855 to 1856 and 1879 to 1886, and of Aker municipal council from 1869 to 1877. During the term 1880–1882 he served as a deputy representative to the Norwegian Parliament. The reason why he changed from Aker to Christiania after 1877 was that Frogner, where he lived, was incorporated into the city in 1878. His villa is now used as the embassy of the United Kingdom.

Heftye was decorated as a Knight of the Swedish Order of the Polar Star in 1860, the Royal Norwegian Order of St. Olav in 1864, the Danish Order of the Dannebrog in 1866 and the French Légion d'honneur in 1867. He was also a Commander of the Austrian Order of Franz Joseph from 1867 and of the Swedish Order of Vasa in 1877. He died in October 1886 in Kristiania. A memorial stone was raised for him at Midtstuen, and the road Thomas Heftyes gate in Frogner, Oslo has been named after him.

Business positions
Preceded by Helle Ingier	Chairman of Akers Sparebank; 1873–1886	Succeeded by Hans Johan Woxen (acting)
