= Henrik Heftye =

Norwegian businessman and philanthropist (1804–1864)

Henrik Thomassen Heftye (21 November 1804 – 18 February 1864) was a Norwegian businessman and philanthropist.

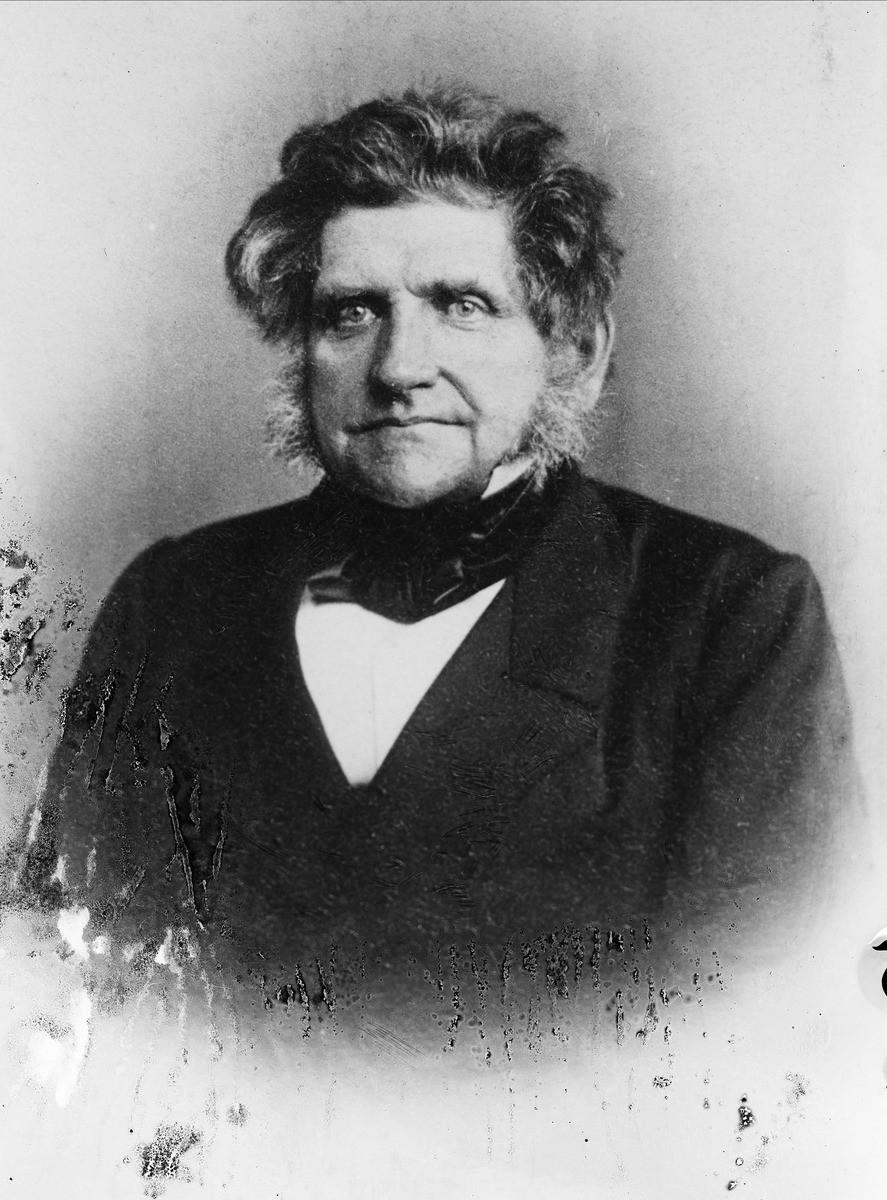
Henrik Heftye

== Personal life ==
He was born in Christiania as the son of merchant Thomas Johannessen Heftye (1767–1827) and his wife Katharina Tschudi (1773–1807). Through his sister Betha he was a brother-in-law of ship-owner Mogens Thorsen. He was the brother of banker and politician Johannes Thomassen Heftye, and through him an uncle of banker Thomas Johannessen Heftye, and a granduncle of Thomas Heftye.

== Career ==
His father migrated to Norway from Switzerland in the late eighteenth century, and founded the family company Thos. Joh. Heftye & Søn. Henrik Heftye took the cand.theol. degree in 1829, but after this he joined the family company. He was the director of Norges Hypotekbank from 1852, and a member of the board of Storebrand from 1853 to 1858. He was also involved in the art community, being a co-founder and treasurer of Christiania Kunstforening in 1836. Other founding members were Johan Sebastian Welhaven, Johan Dahl and Frederik Stang.

In 1862 he wrote his will, in which he donated sums to philanthropy. Among others, his donations founded what is today known as Heftye Kindergarten (Heftyes barnehage). He died in February 1864 in Aker.
