= Johannes Thomassen Heftye =

Norwegian politician (1792–1856)

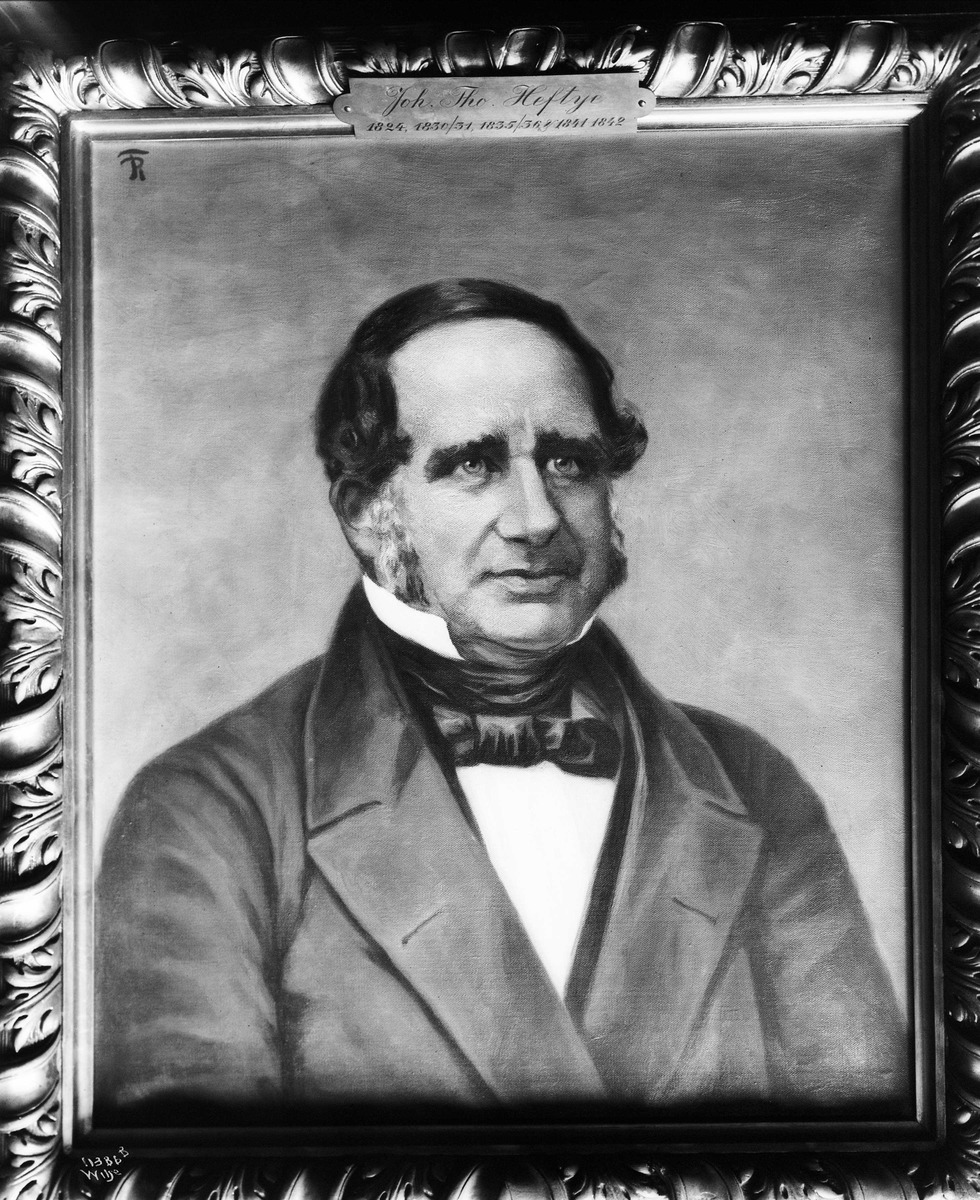
Johannes Tho. Heftye in a painting that was photographed by Anders Beer Wilse in 1919.

Johannes Thomassen Heftye (17 October 1792 – 2 November 1856) was a Norwegian businessperson and politician.

He was the son of merchant Thomas Johannessen Heftye (1767–1827), an immigrant from Switzerland who founded the family company Thos. Joh. Heftye & Søn. He was the father of banker Thomas Johannessen Heftye and grandfather of Thomas Heftye. He was also an older brother of Henrik Heftye and a brother-in-law of ship-owner Mogens Thorsen.

He was elected to the Norwegian Parliament in 1827, representing the constituency of Christiania. He worked as a merchant and consul there. He only served one term.
