= Dissolution of the union between Norway and Sweden =

1905 dissolution of union

- Date: 7 June – 26 October 1905
- Motive: Norway's desire to conduct its foreign affairs independently of Sweden, as the Foreign Ministry in Stockholm was perceived as not fulfilling these duties adequately.
- Outcome: Full independence for Norway after 91 years of personal union with Sweden.

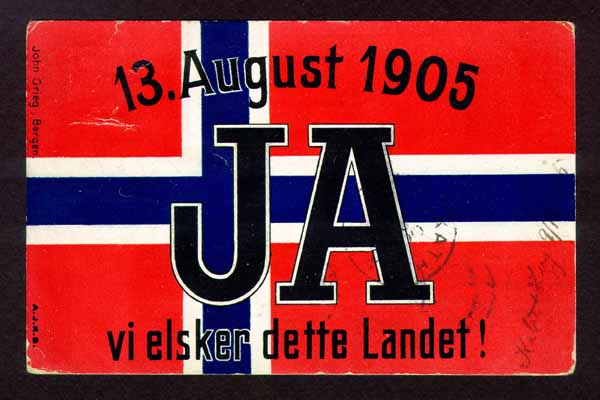
A postcard from around the time of the Norwegian plebiscite. Ja, vi elsker dette landet ('Yes, we love this country') are the opening words of the Norwegian national anthem.

The dissolution of the union (Bokmål: unionsoppløsningen; Nynorsk: unionsoppløysinga; Landsmål: unionsuppløysingi; Swedish: unionsupplösningen) between the kingdoms of Norway and Sweden under the House of Bernadotte, was set in motion by a resolution of the Storting on 7 June 1905. Following some months of tension and fear of an outbreak of war between the neighbouring kingdoms (then in personal union) – and a Norwegian plebiscite held on 13 August which overwhelmingly backed dissolution – negotiations between the two governments led to Sweden's recognition of Norway as an independent constitutional monarchy on 26 October 1905. On that date, King Oscar II renounced his claim to the Norwegian throne, effectively dissolving the United Kingdoms of Sweden and Norway, and this event was swiftly followed, on 18 November, by the accession to the Norwegian throne of Prince Carl of Denmark, taking the name of Haakon VII.

== Background ==
Norwegian nationalistic aspirations in 1814 were frustrated by Sweden's victory in a brief but decisive war that resulted in Norway entering into a personal union with Sweden. The Norwegian constitution was largely kept intact. Norway legally had the status of an independent state with its own parliament, judiciary, legal system, armed forces, flag, and currency. However, Norway and Sweden shared a common monarch and conducted a common foreign policy through the Swedish ministry of foreign affairs. There largely existed feelings of goodwill between the two peoples, and the King generally tried to act in the interest of both Kingdoms.

However, over the years, a divergence of Norwegian and Swedish interests became apparent. In particular, Norwegians felt that their foreign policy interests were inadequately served by Sweden's ministry of foreign affairs. There were several driving factors behind the growing conflict:

- The Norwegian economy was more dependent on foreign trade and thus more sensitive to the protectionist measures favored by the mercantilist Swedish government at the time.
- Norway had trading and other links with the United Kingdom whereas Sweden had closer links with Germany.
- Norway had more interests than Sweden did outside of Europe.

In addition, Norwegian politics were increasingly dominated by liberal tendencies characterised by the extension of parliamentary democracy, while Swedish politics tended to be more conservative. Under the Norwegian Constitution, the Norwegian Parliament, the Storting, was the most powerful legislature on the continent. The king only had a suspensive veto in Norway, and the Storting resisted numerous royal attempts to be granted the absolute veto that the monarchy had in Sweden. Additionally, by 1884, the Storting's power had grown to the point that a king could no longer appoint a Norwegian government entirely of his own choosing or keep it in office against the will of the Storting. In contrast, the king remained a near-autocrat (at least on paper) in his Swedish domains until 1905, just before the end of the union.

When free trade between the two countries was restricted in 1895 by the abolition of the "Interstate laws" (Mellomrikslovene), the economic reasons for the continued union were also diminished.

=== Consul affair ===
The conflict came to a head over the so-called "consul affair" in which successive Norwegian governments insisted that Norway should establish its own consular offices abroad rather than rely on the common consulates appointed by the Swedish foreign minister. The criticism in Norway was manifold. First, several consuls were neither Norwegian nor Swedish but from the country in which they resided. Although they were supposed to represent Norway, they knew little about Norwegian needs and conditions. Second, there was also criticism that the existing network of consulates in Europe prioritised Swedish interests over Norwegian trade (thus delaying the modernisation of the tonnage tax despite cross-political agreement in Norway for such changes). Third, although Norway had expanded its trading areas from Europe to North and South America, the West Indies, Africa and Asia, none of these areas were particularly well-covered by the existing consular network.

Furthermore, while in most other Western countries it was common practice for good consuls to become diplomats, it was the opposite for Sweden. Diplomats with no experience as consuls were often used as such. Thus, they had a more diplomatic than commercial approach. A further problem was that while the international trend was that industrialisation and free trade needed larger markets, and consulates thus had a large trade-oriented task, the Swedish Parliament was dominated by protectionist trade policy. The consulates thus had to respond to both Norwegian offensive trade interests and Swedish skepticism on trade.

=== Preparations for independence ===
While Norway's Liberal Party had initially pioneered an uncompromising position through the so-called "fist policy," the Conservative Party also came to adopt a strong policy in favour of at least de facto independence and equality within the personal union. Although both parties made efforts to resolve the issue through negotiations, Norwegian public opinion gradually became more entrenched.

Both Sweden and Norway increased their military expenditure; Norway not only modernised the frontier forts at Kongsvinger and Fredriksten, but also built a series of new military strongholds along its border with Sweden.

== Prelude to dissolution ==
The Norwegian Storting passes the "revolutionary" resolution

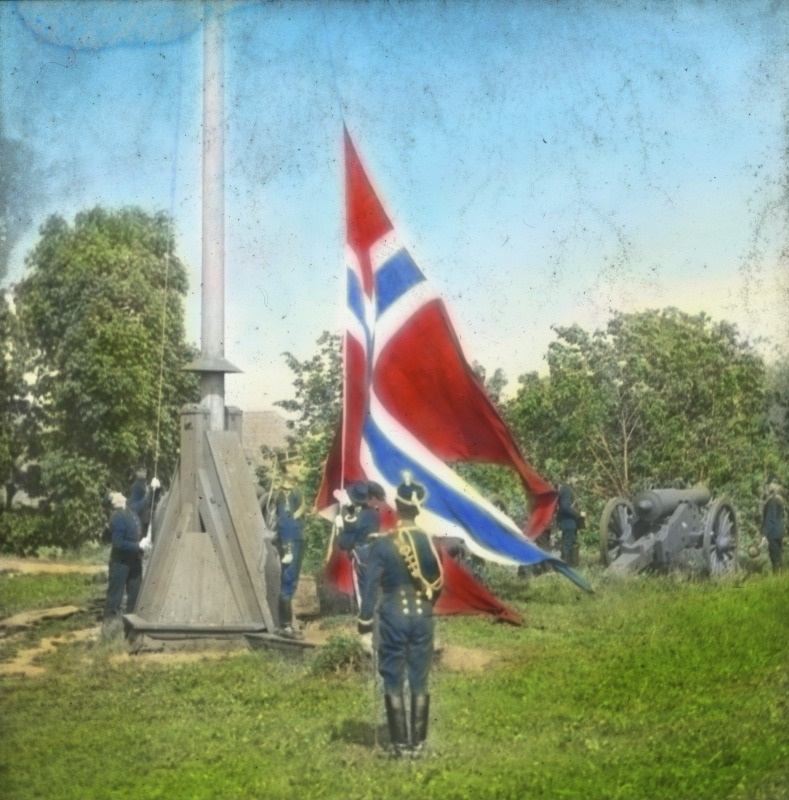
The Norwegian flag, without the union mark, is raised at Akershus Fortress following the dissolution resolution

In early 1905, Norwegian Prime Minister Christian Michelsen formed a coalition government consisting of liberals and conservatives, whose only stated objective was to establish a separate Norwegian corps of consuls. The law was passed by the Norwegian parliament. As expected and probably as planned, King Oscar II vetoed the laws, and the Michelsen government tendered its resignation.

However, Oscar refused to accept the resignations. In turn, Michelsen and his ministers refused to countersign Oscar's decision and returned to Christiania on 7 June 1905, triggering a constitutional crisis. Later that day, the Storting voted unanimously to dissolve the union with Sweden, taking the line that Oscar had effectively abandoned his role as King of Norway by refusing to appoint a replacement government. It also empowered the Michelsen cabinet to act as a caretaker government until further notice, vesting it with the executive authority normally vested in the crown.

The text of the unanimous declaration, remarkable for the fact that the declaration of the dissolution was an aside to the main clause, read:

Since all the members of the cabinet have resigned their positions; since His Majesty the King has declared his inability to obtain for the country a new government; and since the constitutional monarchy has ceased to exist, the Storting hereby authorizes the cabinet that resigned today to exercise the powers held by the King in accordance with the Constitution of Norway and relevant laws – with the amendments necessitated by the dissolution of the union with Sweden under one King, resulting from the fact that the King no longer functions as a Norwegian King.

=== Plebiscite ===
Initially reacting to this declaration as a rebellious act, the Swedish government indicated an openness to a negotiated end to the union, insisting among other things on a Norwegian plebiscite. However, the Norwegian government had anticipated this, and had already scheduled a plebiscite for 13 August—thus avoiding the appearance that it had been called in response to demands from Sweden.

In one of the most lopsided referendum results in history, the plebiscite was held on 13 August and resulted in an overwhelming 368,208 votes (99.95%) in favor of confirming the dissolution of the union against only 184 (0.05%) opposed.

The government thereby had confirmation of the dissolution. 85 percent of Norwegian men had cast their votes, but no women as universal suffrage was not extended to women at the time (and would not be until 1913). Norwegian activists did, however, collect 279,878 women's signatures in favor of dissolution.

=== Reactions outside Norway ===
Besides internal changes within Norway, a key factor that allowed Norway to break from Sweden was the emerging Swedish social democratic movement. In the early years of the 20th century, the head of the Swedish Social Democrats, Hjalmar Branting, led his party in opposing a war to keep Norway united with Sweden. When the crisis of 1905 occurred, he coined the slogan "Hands off Norway, King!" The Social Democrats organized both resistance to a call-up of reserves and a general strike against a war. The majority of the Swedish people were supportive of a fully separate Norway.

Polar explorer Fridtjof Nansen weighed in heavily for dissolving the union, and personally traveled to the United Kingdom, where he successfully lobbied for British support for Norway's independence movement.

== Karlstad negotiations ==
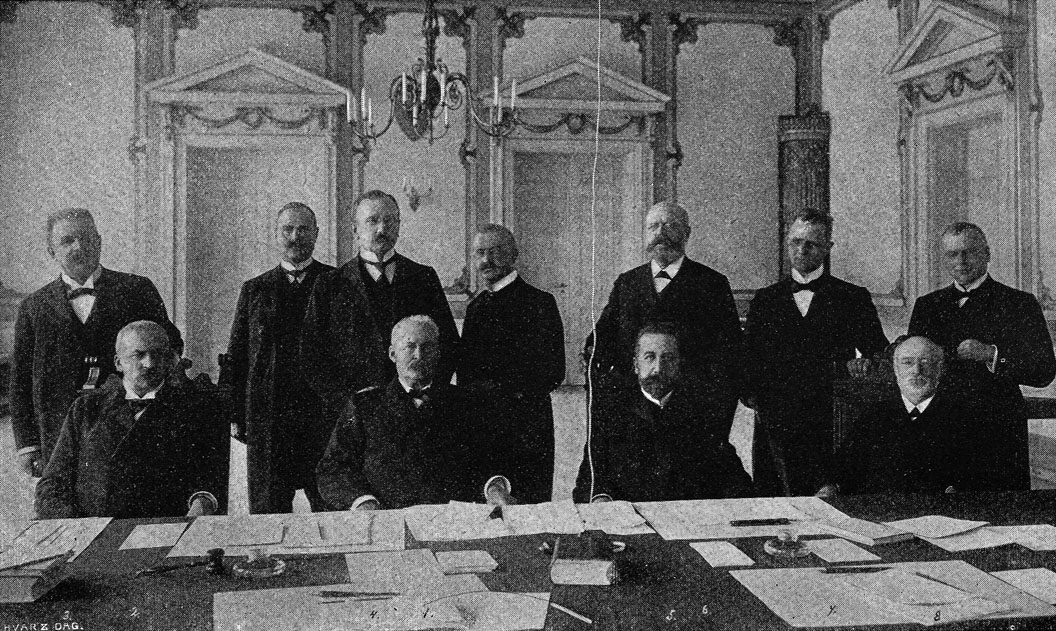
Norwegian and Swedish delegates meeting in Karlstad to negotiate the terms of the dissolution.

On 31 August, Norwegian and Swedish delegates met in the Swedish city of Karlstad to negotiate the terms of the dissolution. Although many prominent right-wing Swedish politicians favored a hardline approach to the issue, historical scholars have found that the Swedish King had determined early on that it would be better to lose the union than risk a war with Norway. The overwhelming public support among Norwegians for independence had convinced the major European powers that the independence movement was legitimate, and Sweden feared it would be isolated by suppressing it; furthermore, there was little appetite for creating additional ill-will between the two countries.

Even as the negotiations made progress, military forces, though separated by 2 kilometers, were quietly deployed on both sides of the border between Sweden and Norway. Public opinion among Norwegian leftists favored a war of independence if necessary, regardless of Sweden's numerical superiority.

On 23 September, the negotiations concluded. On 9 October the Norwegian parliament voted to accept the terms of the dissolution; on 13 October the Swedish parliament followed suit. Although Norway had considered the union with Sweden ended as of 7 June, Sweden formally recognized Norwegian independence on 26 October when King Oscar II renounced his and any of his descendants' claims to the Norwegian throne.

== Choosing a Norwegian king ==
=== The "Bernadotte Offer" ===
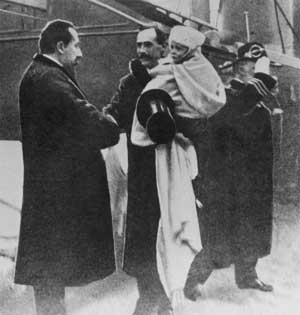
The new king Haakon VII arrives in Norway with Crown Prince Olav on his arm and is greeted on board the ship Heimdal by Prime Minister Christian Michelsen

In its resolution of 7 June, the Storting had made what is called the "Bernadotte Offer", which invited King Oscar II to allow one of his younger sons to assume the Norwegian throne. The offer was at one level an attempt by the Norwegian government to demonstrate goodwill towards Sweden and its royal house, notwithstanding the separation of the two countries. At another, more significant level, it was also intended to reassure the other European powers that the secession of Norway was not a radical revolutionary project, despite the influence of socialists. The continuation of the monarchical system would signal that tradition, continuity and order would be cherished as before in the new country. In this way, Norway aimed to gather support from the other large European countries which, with the exception of France, were all hereditary monarchies.

Unlike the declaration of independence, the Bernadotte Offer was a matter of contention and controversy within the Norwegian government. Five socialists in the Parliament voted against the idea of having a monarchy, and the Finance Minister Gunnar Knudsen, a republican member of the Cabinet, resigned over this issue. It was known that King Oscar II was not amenable to accepting the offer, but the issue remained unsettled until the offer was formally declined by the king when he renounced his claim on 26 October.

=== Prince Carl of Denmark ===
The King's rejection of the Bernadotte offer had been anticipated months earlier, and already during the summer a Norwegian delegation had approached Denmark with a proposal regarding the 33-year-old Prince Carl of Denmark, the second son of Crown Prince Frederick. Prince Carl was related on his father's side to medieval Norwegian kings, providing a link to Norway's past history. Prince Carl's mother, Louise of Sweden, was the niece of Oscar II and the only child of Oscar's elder brother and predecessor, Charles XV of Sweden, and therefore a link to the royal house of Sweden would be preserved. Also, Carl was married to Maud, daughter of King Edward VII of the United Kingdom. By bringing in a British-born queen, it was hoped that Norway could court Britain's support. Another advantage was that Prince Carl was already the father of a son, the two-year-old Alexander, ensuring that a successor would be in position to continue the line. The Norwegian parliament considered other candidates, but ultimately chose Prince Carl.

Prince Carl impressed the delegation in many ways, not least because of his sensitivity to the liberal and democratic movements that had led to Norway's independence. Though the Norwegian constitution stipulated that the Storting could choose a new king if the throne were vacant, Carl was aware that many Norwegians — including leading politicians and high-ranking military officers — favored a republican form of government. Attempts to persuade the prince to accept the throne on the basis of the Parliament's and not the common citizenry's choice failed; Carl insisted that he would accept the crown only if the Norwegian people expressed their will for monarchy by referendum, and also if the parliament then elected him king.

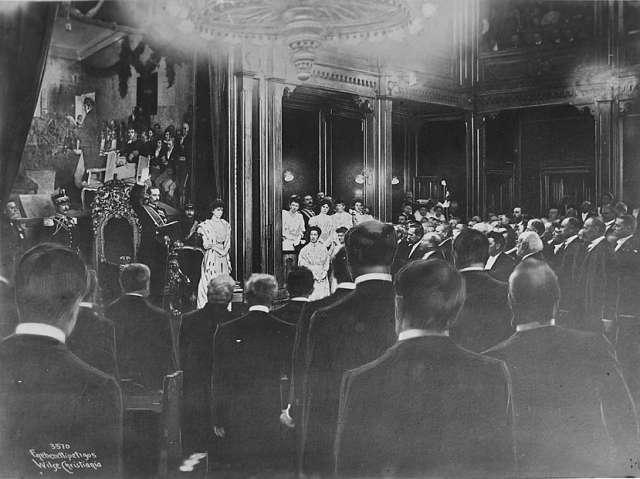
Haakon VII swearing in as king in the Parliament of Norway Building

On 12 and 13 November, in the second constitutional plebiscite in three months, Norwegian voters decided by a majority of nearly 79% (259,563 to 69,264) to establish a monarchy instead of a republic. Many who favoured a republic in principle voted for a monarchy because they felt it would help the newly independent Norwegian nation gain legitimacy among the European monarchies.

Five days later, on 18 November, the Storting overwhelmingly elected Carl and his descendants as the new royal dynasty of Norway. On that same date, the Speaker of the Storting sent Prince Carl a telegram informing him of his election. After obtaining formal permission from his grandfather Christian IX of Denmark, Prince Carl replied that same evening, accepting the Norwegian throne and choosing the name Haakon, a traditional name used by Norwegian kings. The last king with that name was Haakon VI, who died in 1380. The new king therefore took the regnal name Haakon VII, while his son Alexander was renamed Olav and became crown prince.

After a three-day journey, the new royal family arrived in the capital Kristiania (later renamed Oslo) on 25 November. Haakon VII took his constitutional oath before parliament on 27 November. However, Norway reckons Haakon as having become king immediately upon accepting his election, and counts 18 November as the formal beginning of his reign. He and Queen Maud were crowned in Nidaros Cathedral in Trondheim on 22 June 1906. This was the last coronation held in Norway.

== Important individuals in the dissolution ==
The following individuals played a role in the events surrounding the dissolution of the union between Norway and Sweden:

- Bjørnstjerne Bjørnson, Norwegian writer and the 1903 Nobel Prize in Literature laureate.
- Erik Gustaf Boström, Prime Minister of Sweden between July 1902 and April 1905.
- Hjalmar Branting, Swedish politician and future Prime Minister of Sweden.
- Sigurd Bødtker, Norwegian theater critic.
- Christopher Bruun, Norwegian priest and educator
- Karl Sigwald Johannes Bull, Norwegian military officer and politician.
- Wilhelm Christopher Christophersen, Norwegian diplomat.
- Øvre Richter Frich, Norwegian reporter, newspaper editor and crime writer.
- Arne Garborg, Norwegian writer.
- Haakon VII of Norway, known as Prince Carl of Denmark until 1905, he was the first king of Norway after the 1905 dissolution.
- Thomas Heftye, Norwegian military officer, engineer, sports official and politician.
- Gunnar Heiberg, a Norwegian poet, playwright, journalist and theater critic.
- Frederik Hilfling-Rasmussen, Danish-born Norwegian photographer.
- Sigurd Ibsen, Norwegian author, lawyer and statesman, who served as Prime Minister of Norway in Stockholm (1903–1905).
- Christian Lundeberg, Prime Minister of Sweden between August and November 1905
- Maud of Wales, British-born princess, Queen of Norway as spouse of King Haakon VII.
- Christian Michelsen, Norwegian shipping magnate and statesman, and first Prime Minister of an independent Norway in 1905.
- Fridtjof Nansen, Norwegian explorer, scientist, diplomat, humanitarian and the 1922 Nobel Peace Prize laureate.
- Johan Ramstedt, Prime Minister of Sweden between April and August 1905

== Importance of the events of 1905 ==
In many ways, the events of 1905 formed a sequel to the events of 1814, but there were some important differences:

- Whereas the 1814 independence movement in large part was driven by political opportunism among the national elite, the 1905 movement was a result of political trends largely driven by elected officials with massive popular support.
- In 1905, Norway was not put in play by war as a territorial prize.
- By 1905, Norwegians had established many of the institutions and infrastructure of a sovereign, independent state.
- By 1905, European statesmanship was more inclined to favor Norwegian independence than in 1814.

Much has been made of the supremacy of diplomacy in averting war between Sweden and Norway in 1905. In truth, the Norwegians were much more willing to fight than the Swedes if it had come to war. Both parties recognized that their geographical proximity made long-term hostility untenable under any circumstances.

Many documents related to the specific events of 1905 were destroyed during and following those years. Some historians speculate that foreign interests played a stronger role than had previously been assumed; in particular, that Great Britain influenced the dissolution in order to reduce German influence over Atlantic ports as part of British attempts to maintain its naval supremacy. Although Sweden's close relationship with Germany did not last long, Norway's independence immediately put it inside the British sphere of influence.

== See also ==
- 1905 Norwegian union dissolution referendum
- Norwegian independence movement (1814)
- Dissolution of Czechoslovakia (another example of a peaceful dissolution)

== External resources ==
- Joint website by the Norwegian national library and Swedish national archive on 1905
- Official elections results from the referendum on Norwegian separation from Sweden. Includes results on the referendum on establishing the monarchy
