= University of Agder =

Public university in Norway

- Universitetet i Agder
- Type: Public university
- Established: 2007; 19 years ago 1994; 32 years ago, 1839; 187 years ago
- Rector: Sunniva Whittaker
- Total staff: 2202
- Students: 14,215 (2021)
- Location: Kristiansand & Grimstad, Norway; 58°9′46.82″N 8°0′11.6″E
- Campus: Gimlemoen Grimstad Municipality
- Website: uia.no

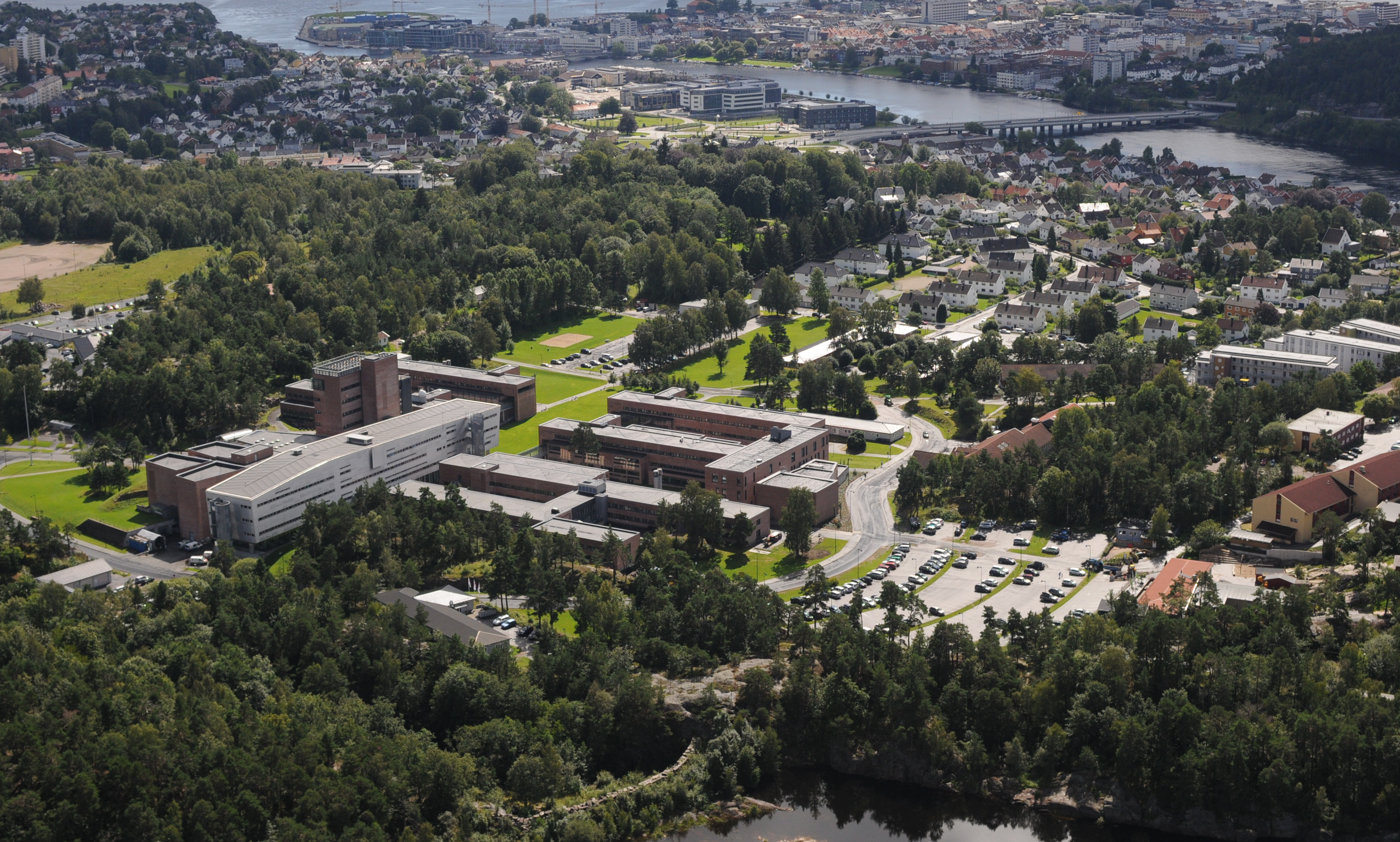
Panorama view of Gimlemoen.

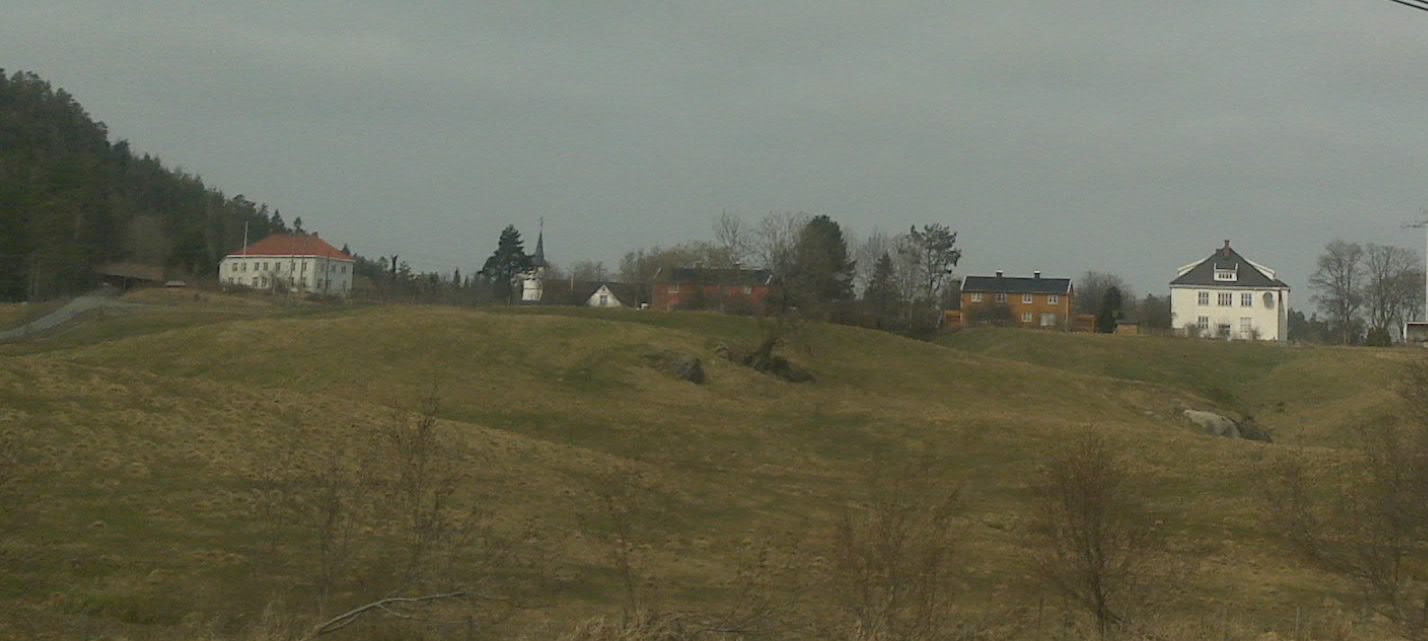
Campus of Kristiansand Teacher Training College

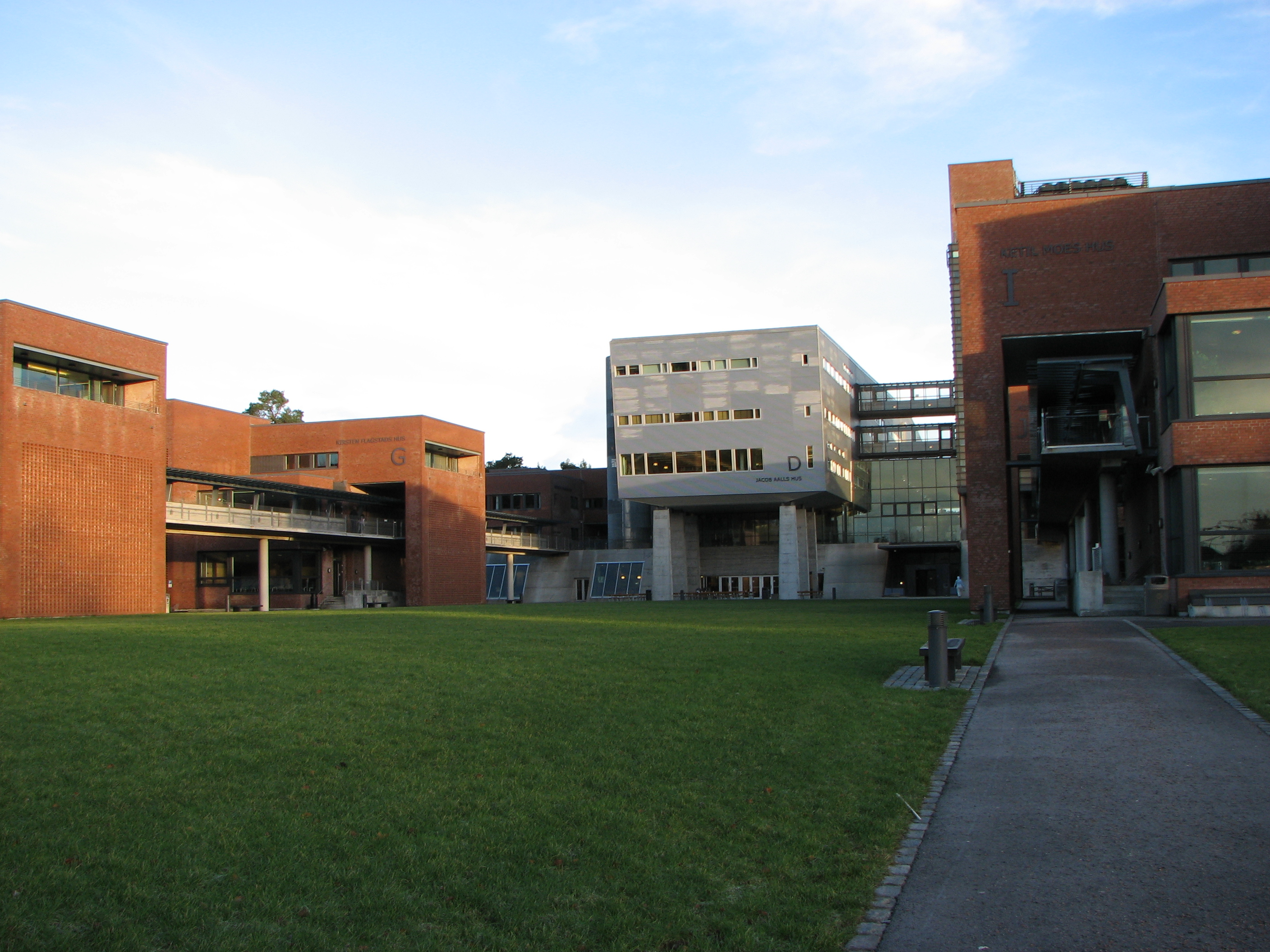
Campus Gimlemoen, located in Kristiansand.

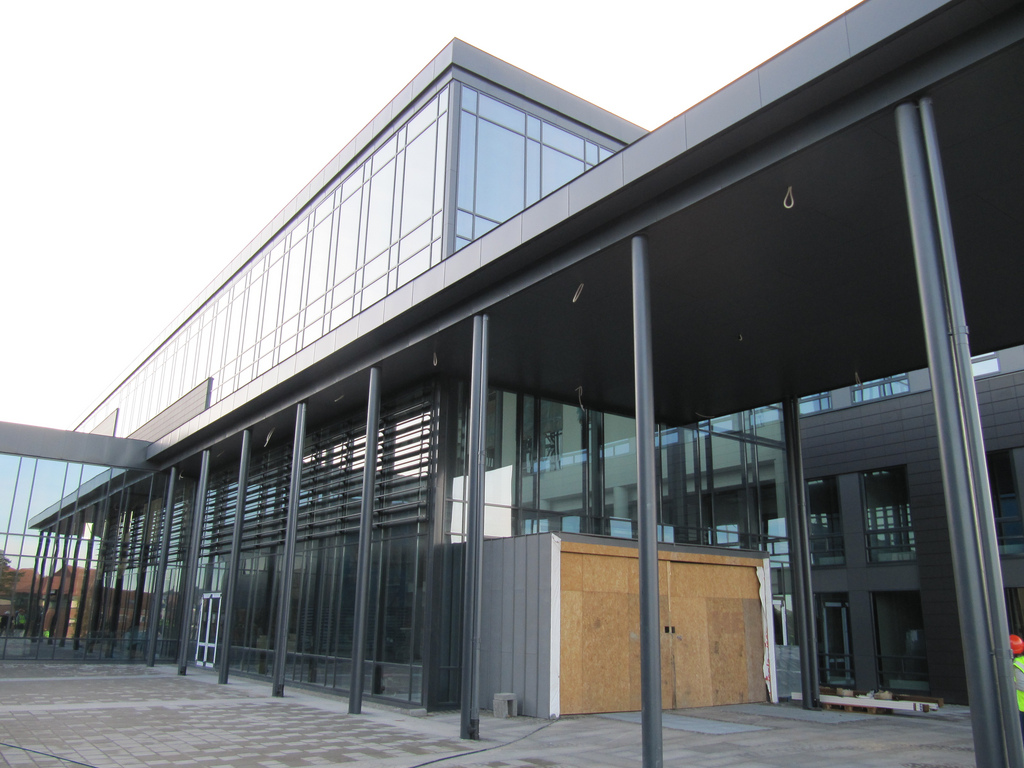
Campus Grimstad, main entrance

The University of Agder (Norwegian: Universitetet i Agder), formerly known as Agder College and Agder University College, is a public university with campuses in Kristiansand and Grimstad, Norway. The institution was established as a university college (høgskole) in 1994 through the merger of the Agder University College and five other colleges, including a technical college and a nursing school, and was granted the status of a full university in 2007.

== History ==
The idea of a university in the Agder region is not completely new. In his short period as ruler of the union of Denmark–Norway, Johann Friedrich Struensee planned on reforming the University of Copenhagen. He ordered Bishop Johann Ernst Gunnerus of Trondheim to develop more detailed plans. Gunnerus presented a proposal in 1771 in which he suggested establishing a new university in Norway, and placing it in Kristiansand.

The motives for suggesting Kristiansand as a university town have been debated. Regardless, the idea was soon discarded as planning began for the first Norwegian university. In 1811, a resolution was passed to establish Norway's first university in Christiania (Oslo).

Even without a university in the region, and as the need for better educated employees rose, several smaller colleges were established throughout the Agder region. The first, Christiansands Stiftsseminarium på Holt, later known as Kristiansand Teacher Training College, was founded at Holt Municipality in 1839, making it one of the oldest institutions of higher education in Norway. It was followed by Arendal College of Nursing (1920), Agder Music Conservatory (1965), Agder Regional College of Technology (1967), Agder Regional College (1969) and Kristiansand College of Nursing (1976).

Agder University College was established by a merger in 1994, when the six public regional colleges in the Agder counties became one institution. The University College received full university accreditation and became the University of Agder on 1 September 2007.

== Organisation and administration ==
UiA has a shared leadership. The rector, who becomes the head of the university board and bears responsibility for the academic programmes and activities, is elected by the faculty, staff, and students. The university director, by contrast, is the head of administration and is responsible for financial and administrative affairs.

== Student culture ==
At campus Kristiansand, the heart of the university building is the axis that stretches from the "wandering hall" by the main entrance, to the canteen. The library, two cafés, a book store, the largest lecture halls and other facilities are located along this axis.

Every autumn, experienced students organizes events, stands, competitions and "social groups" to welcome the newly arrived students. Students also organizes several cultural, charitable and athletic associations. In addition to this, UiA offers student accommodation on campus as well as a gym.

Virtually all athletic activity at campus Kristiansand is organized by Kristiansand Studentidrettslag (KSI), while the teams at campus Grimstad constitutes Grimstad Studentidrettslag (GSI). Membership is offered to students of UiA and other institutions of higher education in the area only. Sports offered at one or both of the campuses includes football, golf, handball, floorball, basketball, volleyball and multiple martial arts. The male student lacrosse team in Kristiansand is a notable exception, as it operates independently from KSI. Teams from KSI and GSI competes in local leagues as well as selected regional and/or national tournaments.

Students at UiA also organizes several orchestras and choirs, political and non-profit/charitable associations, as well as associations specific to the different programs. The pubs and concert venues "Østsia" (East side/wing) and "Bluebox" is located at campus Kristiansand and Grimstad, respectively. The students at UiA does not shy away from the general nightlife, however, as they frequent the pubs, bars and clubs in downtown Kristiansand and Grimstad.

== International collaboration ==
The university of Agder is an active member of the University of the Arctic. UArctic is an international cooperative network based in the Circumpolar Arctic region, consisting of more than 200 universities, colleges, and other organizations with an interest in promoting education and research in the Arctic region.

The university also participates in UArctic's mobility program north2north. The aim of that program is to enable students of member institutions to study in different parts of the North.

== Transport and infrastructure ==
Both campuses are located some distance outside their respective city centers, along the E18, one of eastern/southern Norway's major roadways (E18 becomes the equally important E39 right after passing the campus in Kristiansand).

== Faculties and academia ==
The University of Agder has six faculties as well as an own unit for teacher education.

=== School of Business and Law ===
- Department of Economics and Finance
- Department of Management
- Department of Working Life and Innovation
- Department of Law

The School of Business and Law is a member of the EFMD and AACSB, and is AACSB-accredited for its high-quality education on an international level as of 2019.

=== Faculty of Social Sciences ===
- Department of Development Studies
- Department of Information Systems
- Department of Political Science and Management
- Department of Sociology and Social Work

=== Faculty of Fine Arts ===
- Department of Music (Gimlemoen)
- Department of Visual and Dramatic Arts (Gimlemoen)

=== Faculty of Health and Sport Sciences ===
- Department of Public Health, Sport and Nutrition (Gimlemoen/Grimstad)
- Department of Health and Nursing Science (Gimlemoen/Grimstad)
- Department of Psychososial Health (Gimlemoen/Grimstad)

=== Faculty of Humanities and Education ===
- Department of Foreign Languages and Translation (Gimlemoen/Grimstad)
- Department of Nordic and Media Studies (Gimlemoen)
- Department of Education (Gimlemoen)
- Department of Religion, Philosophy and History (Gimlemoen)

=== Faculty of Engineering and Science ===
- Department of Mathematical Sciences (Gimlemoen)
- Department of Natural Sciences (Gimlemoen)
- Department of Engineering (Grimstad)
- Department of ICT (Grimstad)

=== Teacher Education Unit ===
The teacher training programmes are organized in an interdisciplinary fashion.

== Research centres ==
- Achieving Accountability in School Practice
- Center for Artificial Intelligence Research
- Center for intelligent networks and signal processing
- Centre for Business Systems
- Centre for Care Research
- Centre for Cultural Studies
- Centre for Development Studies
- Centre for Didactics
- Centre for Digital Transformation (CeDiT)
- Centre for Entrepreneurship
- Centre for European Studies
- Centre for Gender Equality
- Centre for Innovation and Work Life Studies
- Centre for International Economics and Shipping
- Centre for Multicultural Activities
- Centre for Norwegian Studies Abroad
- Centre for Real Estate
- Center for Sustainable Energy Solutions
- Norwegian Centre for Offshore Wind Energy (NORCOWE)

== Library ==
Agder University Research Archive (AURA) is a full text digital archive of scientific papers, theses and dissertations from the academic staff and students at the University of Agder. The University Library administrates AURA.
