= Jørgen Løvland =

Prime Minister of Norway from 1907 to 1908 (1848–1922)

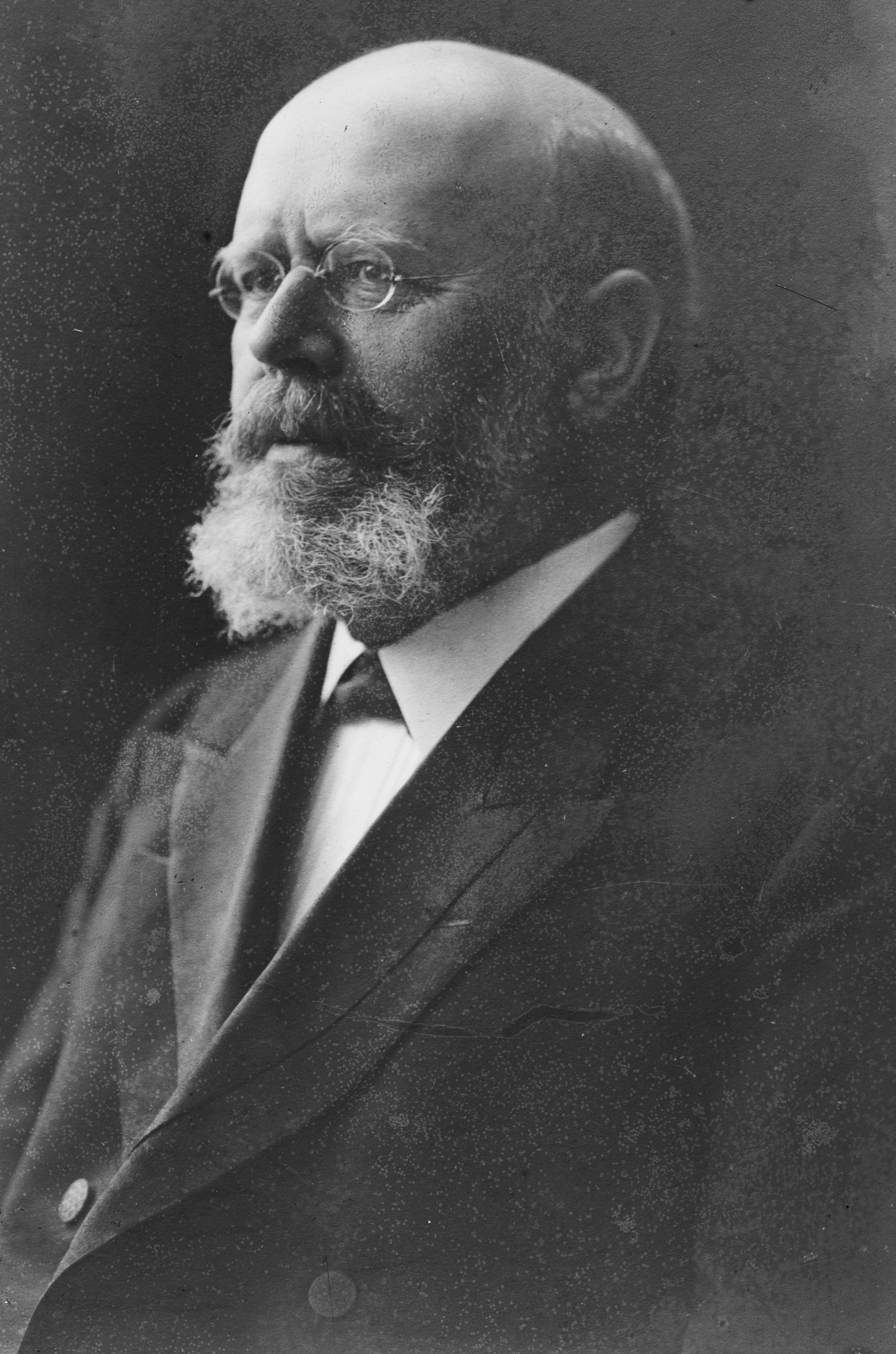
- Jørgen Løvland

Prime Minister of Norway
- In office 23 October 1907 – 19 March 1908
- Monarch: Haakon VII
- Preceded by: Christian Michelsen
- Succeeded by: Gunnar Knudsen

Minister of Foreign Affairs
- In office 7 June 1905 – 19 March 1908
- Prime Minister: Christian Michelsen; Himself
- Preceded by: Position established
- Succeeded by: Wilhelm Christophersen

Norwegian Prime Minister in Stockholm
- In office 11 March 1905 – 7 June 1905
- Monarch: Oscar II
- Prime Minister: Christian Michelsen
- Preceded by: Sigurd Ibsen
- Succeeded by: Position abolished

Minister of Education and Church Affairs
- In office 26 October 1915 – 21 June 1920
- Prime Minister: Gunnar Knudsen
- Preceded by: Aasulv Bryggesaa
- Succeeded by: Nils R. Jensen

Minister of Labour
- In office 5 June 1900 – 22 October 1903
- Prime Minister: Johannes Steen; Otto Blehr
- Preceded by: Hans Nysom
- Succeeded by: Albert Hansen
- In office 17 February 1898 – 28 February 1899
- Prime Minister: Johannes Steen
- Preceded by: Fredrik Stang Lund
- Succeeded by: Hans Nysom

Personal details
- Born: Jørgen Gunnarsson Løvland; 3 February 1848 Evje, Nedenes, United Kingdoms of Sweden and Norway
- Died: 21 August 1922 (aged 74) Christiania, Norway
- Party: Liberal
- Spouse: Laura Mathilde Torkildson (m. 1884)
- Children: Torkell Løvland
- Education: Kristiansand Teacher Training College

Jørgen Gunnarsson Løvland (3 February 1848 – 21 August 1922) was a Norwegian statesman, educator and civil servant who served as the prime minister of Norway from 1907 to 1908. He belonged to the Liberal Party.

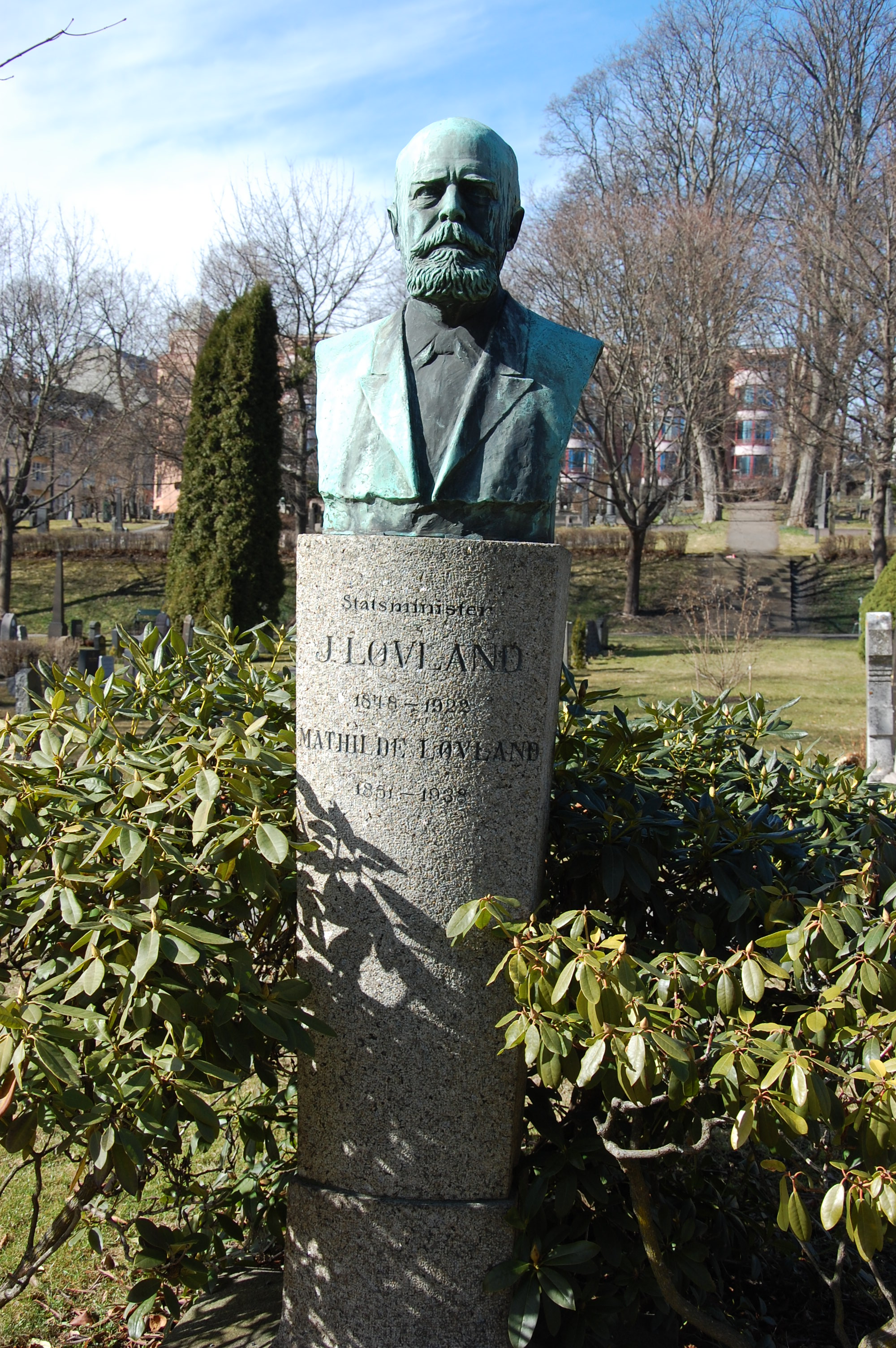
Gravesite of Jørgen Løvland, Vår Frelsers gravlund in Oslo

== Background ==
Løvland was born at Lauvland in Evje og Vegusdal Municipality (in the present-day Evje og Hornnes Municipality) in Nedenes county, Norway. He came from a farming family. He graduated from Christianssands Stifts Seminarium teachers’ seminary in 1865. He worked as primary school teacher in Christianssand (1866-1878) and then as headmaster in Setesdal (1878-1884). From 1884 to 1892 he was also editor of Christianssands Stiftsavis.

== Political career ==
He represented the Liberal party at the Norwegian Parliament (Storting) 1886-1888 and again in 1892–1898. He was Minister of Labour (1898–1899, 1900–1902, 1902–1903), a member of the Council of State Division in Stockholm (1899–1900), Minister of Foreign Affairs (1905 and 1905–1907), Prime Minister and Minister of Foreign Affairs (1907–1908), and Minister of Education and Church Affairs (1915–1920). In 1905 became the prime minister in Stockholm. He was chair of the Norwegian government of Christian Michelsen. In October 1907, Løvland took over as Norwegian Prime Minister when Michelsen resigned. Løvland resigned the position in March 1908.

== Norwegian Nobel Committee ==
Løvland was a member of the Norwegian Nobel Committee from the foundation in 1897 until his death in 1922. He was the committee's chairman (1901–1921).

== Personal life ==
He was married to Mathilde Løvland (1851–1938). Following their deaths, both he and his wife were buried at Vår Frelsers gravlund in Oslo.

== See also ==
- Løvland's Cabinet

Political offices
| Preceded by Christian Michelsen | Prime Minister of Norway; 1907–1908 | Succeeded by Gunnar Knudsen |
| New office | Norwegian Minister of Foreign Affairs; 1905–1908 | Succeeded by Wilhelm Christopher Christophersen |
| Preceded by Aasulv Bryggesaa | Norwegian Minister of Education and Church Affairs; 1915–1920 | Succeeded by Nils Riddervold Jensen |
Cultural offices
| Preceded by Marius Hægstad | Chairman of Noregs Mållag; 1909–1912 | Succeeded by Nikolaus Gjelsvik |
