= Thos. Joh. Heftye & Søn =

Norwegian bank company

Thos. Joh. Heftye & Søn was a Norwegian bank company. It was one of the first commercial banks in Norway. Based in Christiania, it was founded in 1818 by Thomas Johannessen Heftye (1767–1827), an immigrant from Switzerland. The bank remained in the family in the next generations, and both Henrik Heftye and Thomas Johannessen Heftye worked there.
