= Peter A. Munch =

Norwegian-American Sociologist (1908-1984)

Peter A. Munch (1928)

Peter Andreas Munch (December 19, 1908 – January 10, 1984) was a Norwegian-born sociologist, educator, and writer. In 1948, he immigrated to the United States as a post-doctoral research fellow studying Norwegian-American rural sociology in the Midwest. He ended his professional career at Southern Illinois University, with a focus on graduate studies and sociological research based on trips to the remote South Atlantic island Tristan da Cunha.

== Biography ==
Peter Andreas Munch was born December 19, 1908, at Nes Municipality in Hedmark, Norway.

He studied theology at the University of Oslo receiving a Candidatus theologiæ degree in 1932. He then completed linguistic studies at the University of Oxford in order to read ancient religious texts, continuing in 1935 with a period at the University of Wittenberg in Halle, Germany, studying social history in the Ancient Near East. This resulted in numerous publications written in Norwegian, English, and German regarding original Hebrew Old Testament texts and their meaning in the modern world.

During 1937 and 1938, he was a member of the Norwegian Scientific Expedition to Tristan da Cunha, where he studied social interaction among the isolated population as a humanist and social scholar. This work was the subject of his doctoral dissertation, finished in 1943 but hidden when he was imprisoned by the German occupation forces at Grini detention camp. In 1946, when the university in Oslo was reopened after World War II, he successfully defended the dissertation titled Sociology of Tristan da Cunha based on the Gemeinschaft concepts introduced by Ferdinand Tönnies, and obtained the degree of Doctor of Philosophy.

Munch immigrated to the United States in 1948 as a research associate in Rural Sociology at the University of Wisconsin, taking a position as associate professor at St. Olaf College in Northfield, Minnesota, in 1949. In 1951 he became Head of the Department of Sociology and Anthropology at the University of North Dakota in Grand Forks, a position held until he was called to be Professor of Sociology, and later Director of Graduate Studies in Sociology, at Southern Illinois University in Carbondale in 1957. Munch worked there until his retirement in 1977, mainly in the fields of cultural anthropology, rural, and maritime sociology.

The experience that more than any other defined Munch's career was his reestablished connection with the islanders of Tristan da Cunha. In 1961, a volcanic eruption on the remote island forced evacuation of the entire population, never before exposed to modern life, to an abandoned Royal Air Force base in southern England. Munch quickly applied for research grants to visit the evacuees and to study their adaptation to modern European life. He found that most islanders were unhappy in their new homes and was relieved when the British government agreed to finance the resettlement of Tristan da Cunha in 1963, when the volcano was again dormant. More grants enabled Munch to visit the islanders on Tristan in 1964-1965 for additional research; a visit that resulted in lectures, books, and articles contributing to our understanding of anarchy, atomism, acculturation in social systems, and to our general knowledge of community and social values.

From 1960 until 1964, he was editor of The Sociological Quarterly. He belonged to numerous professional organizations, serving as officer of the Midwest Sociological Society, Illinois Folklore Society, and the Norwegian-American Historical Association. Munch authored several books and more than 80 articles and chapters in professional publications. He was elected to the Norwegian Academy of Science and Letters in 1983. After his death, memorial ceremonies were held at the University of North Dakota, the Norwegian Academy of Science and Letters, the Norwegian-American Historical Association, the University of North Dakota, and Southern Illinois University.

== Personal life and family ==
Peter Munch was the scion of two well-known Norwegian families. He was the second cousin of the painter Edvard Munch (1868–1944) and the first cousin thrice removed of his own namesake, the historian Peter Andreas Munch (1810–1863). His great-grandfather was the poet and bishop Johan Storm Munch 1778–1832), whose son, Munch's grandfather, Johan Storm Munch (evangelist) (1827–1898) served as missionary to the United States and was the subject of Munch's book, The Strange American Way. Peter Munch's aunt was the feminist and early female surgeon Kristine Munch and his great-uncle the poet Andreas Munch.

On his mother's side, Munch was the grandson of architect/engineer Georg Bull (1829–1917) and nephew of architect Henrik Bull (1864–1953). His great-uncles were the violinist Ole Bull (1810–1880), who entertained in America, and Knud Bull (1811–1889), who was an emigree to Australia. His first cousin once removed was the architect Schak Bull (1858–1956).

In 1934, Peter Munch married Helene Stephansen, with whom he had three children. Munch died in Pleasant Hill, Tennessee at 75 years of age in 1984.

== Peter A. Munch Collection ==
Peter A. Munch was the creator of a collection of material comprising archives from Tristan da Cunha. The materials were donated by the Munch family and are now housed in the Saint Louis Room at Saint Louis University Archives.

== Publications ==
- Norse Mythology - Legends of Gods and Heroes (1926)
- The Expression Bajjôm Hāhū: Is it an Eschatological Terminus Technicus?, The Norwegian Academy of Sciences, Klasse 36, No. 2, pp. 69, Jacob Dybwad, Oslo (1936)
- Sociology of Tristan da Cunha. Results of the Norwegian Scientific Expedition to Tristan da Cunha, 1937-1938 (1945) ISBN 978-0-685-87356-4
- Some Sociological Terms and Concepts, The Norwegian Academy of Sciences, Klasse 1945, No.2, pp. 37, Jacob Dybwad, Oslo (1946)
- Landhandelen i Norge, Halvorsen & Larsen (1948)
- A Study of Cultural change: Rural-Urban Conflicts in Norway, Studia Norvegica, No. 9. H. Aschehoug & Co. Oslo (1956)
- The Strange American Way, S. Illinois Univ. (1970) ISBN 978-0-8093-0440-0
- The Song Tradition of Tristan da Cunha (1970) ISBN 978-0-391-02076-4
- Crisis in Utopia. The Ordeal of Tristan da Cunha (1971) ISBN 0-690-22075-8
- Glimpsing Utopia: Tristan da Cunha 1937–38. A Norwegian's Diary, ed. and translated from the Norwegian, Cathrine Munch Snyder, George Mann Publications. Hampshire, UK (2008) ISBN 9780955241581
