= Baardseth =

Baardseth is a Norwegian surname. Notable people with the surname include:

- Egil Baardseth (1912–1991), Norwegian botanist and phycologist, nephew of Torger
- Torger Baardseth (1875–1947), Norwegian bookseller and publisher
