= Valborg Lerche =

Norwegian theologian (1873–1931)

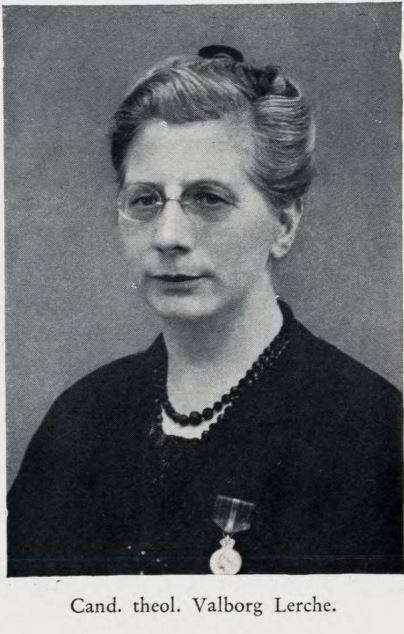

Valborg Lerche (16 April 1873 – 7 March 1931) was a Norwegian social worker. She was the first female theologian in Norway.

== Biography ==
She was born in Sem as a ship-owner Vincent Stoltenberg Lerche, Sr. (1809–1894) and Christine Marie Rosenvinge (1839–1926), and a much younger half-sister of Vincent Stoltenberg Lerche. She also had four older sisters.

She took her examen artium at Gjertsen School in 1892. Two years later the whole family moved after her to Kristiania, enrolling in theology studies at the Royal Frederick University. She graduated with the cand.theol. degree in 1899, as the first Norwegian woman to do so. The profession as clergyman was not available for women at the time, but Lerche as active in Christian organizational work. In 1897 she co-founded the Women Students' Christian Organization, together with other female academic pioneers such as medicine students Kristine Munch and Louise Isachsen. Lerche was chosen as the first chair.

She earned her living as a teacher, until 1901 when she was hired in Kristiania Inner Mission. She was promoted to manager here in 1915. She was behind several social establishments such as orphanages, recreational homes and housing for homeless people. She also visited women's organizations, hospitals and Sunday schools to spread the Christian word. Together with secretary in the Kristiania Inner Mission, Carsten Hansteen, she also conducted exegetic studies of the Bible.

She was awarded the King's Medal of Merit in gold in 1926. She did not marry. In 1929 she suffered from a stroke, and died in 1931. She was buried at Vestre gravlund.
