= Johan Storm Munch (evangelist) =

Norwegian Lutheran pastor (1827–1908)

Johan Storm Munch (21 October 1827 – 13 August 1908) was a Norwegian minister who served as pastor to pioneer Lutheran churches in southern Wisconsin from 1855 to 1859 before returning to Norway and becoming a popular evangelist.

== Background ==
Munch was born in Kristiansand, the son of Lutheran Bishop Johan Storm Munch. The bishop died when the son was only four, leaving the family without an income. However, the Munchs belonged to the cultured social class in Norway, which meant that the younger Johan Storm was expected to get a higher education despite his family's impoverished situation. He worked as a tutor and finished a theology degree in 1852, but continued teaching until he received a call in 1854 to serve pioneer parishes in Wiota and Dodgeville, Wisconsin. He borrowed money from his father-in-law for the trip and set off with his new bride.

The Church of Norway at the time operated as part of the national government and ministers were state employees. The church's sacraments of baptism, confirmation, and marriage were performed on behalf of both church and state and were compulsory for every Norwegian. Munch, however, was strongly in favor of a "free" church and looked forward to his time in America where state and religion were separate.

== American ministry ==
In Wiota, Wisconsin, the Munchs lived near the church, but the pastor also served other Norwegian-speaking settlements, traveling by horse and buggy and often being gone for days at a time. He soon realized he and his parishioners had different ideas of freedom. Freedom for the Norwegian peasant pioneers meant social equality, freedom from the social differentiation conventional in Norway at the time. The presence of a Norwegian professional minister and his family, with refined manners, dress, and speech was a constant source of irritation and was felt by some to be a threat to their newly won freedom. The pioneers wanted preaching and the administration of sacraments within the church building, but any interference in their private lives was regarded as a transgression on their individual freedom.

Munch was strongly in favor of a free church but had no patience with those who confused liberty with license in moral or theological matters. He did not believe in Christianity in name only, which was a tradition some peasant settlers had brought with them from Norway, and would not relinquish his role as guardian of morals in his congregation or his responsibility as curator of the parishioners' souls. He attempted to deny the sacraments to those who in his judgment were in living in vice and sin unless, in private confession, they showed genuine signs of repentance. This brought him into deep conflict with his parishioners. Sometimes bedridden with nervous headaches, Munch decided to return to Norway after four years in America.

== Norwegian ministry ==
At home, Munch first became a chaplain assigned to the Diocese of Christiania (now Oslo) and then a pastor to the new and modern penitentiary in the inner city. Botsfengselet kept all prisoners in solitary confinement and featured flush toilets in every cell. The prison was built on the Philadelphia system, Separate system, from the United States and was meant to support individual rehabilitation. It was a system well suited to Munch's belief in personal counseling for sinners. He stayed there seven years.

Munch's next assignment was as parish pastor in Horten in Vestfold where he was also assigned to the Karljohansvern naval base. In this connection he served as ship pastor on the corvette Nordstjernen when it went on a nine-month double excursion: first as official representative of the Norwegian government at the opening of the Suez Canal on November 17, 1869, and then on a good-will tour to South America. Munch took advantage of his stay at Suez by making a nine-day side trip to the Holy Land, accompanied by Nordstjernen's second officer. Memories from his trip to biblical lands were a life-long inspiration for Munch and, according to his obituary, a continuing contributor to his spiritual health and wellbeing.

With renewed vigor Munch took up his spiritual work when he came home to Norway. As in America, he insisted on personal counseling, spiritual guidance, and confession before he would perform the sacraments of confirmation or marriage. He firmly believed in the minister's personal responsibility for the morality and beliefs of the congregation. This had brought him into conflict with his American constituents and now also with the State Church of Norway. He resigned from the church and moved his family to Christiania, but had no intention of giving up preaching the gospel. After a short time he rejoined the church as an evangelical preacher rather than as an administrator of official church/state sacraments, and built up a sizable following in the city. His venues and audiences grew from a local dance hall, to the gym at Akershus Fortress, and finally to the Calmeyer Street Mission House in Christiania, where he preached for 25 years until failing eyesight and declining health caused his retirement in 1906. His success as an independent evangelist was such that a speech by a member of his flock convinced the Norwegian parliament to grant him a pension.

== Personal life ==
Munch was the son of Lutheran Bishop Johan Storm Munch and his wife Else Petronelle Hofgaard (1790–1879). He was the youngest of eight children. His older brother Andreas Munch was a poet who later lived in Denmark and his cousin was the Norwegian historian Peter Andreas Munch. The painter Edvard Munch was the son of Munch's cousin Christian.

Munch was married to Caja Falch (1830–1898) just prior to his emigration to America, where their first two children were born. Seven more were born after they returned to Norway, among them one of Norway's first female physicians, Kristine Munch. The sociologist Peter A. Munch was one of their grandchildren. Munch's followers built a home for the large family at Bestum, outside Christiania, where Munch died at the age of 81.
