= Knud Bull =

Norwegian painter and counterfeiter

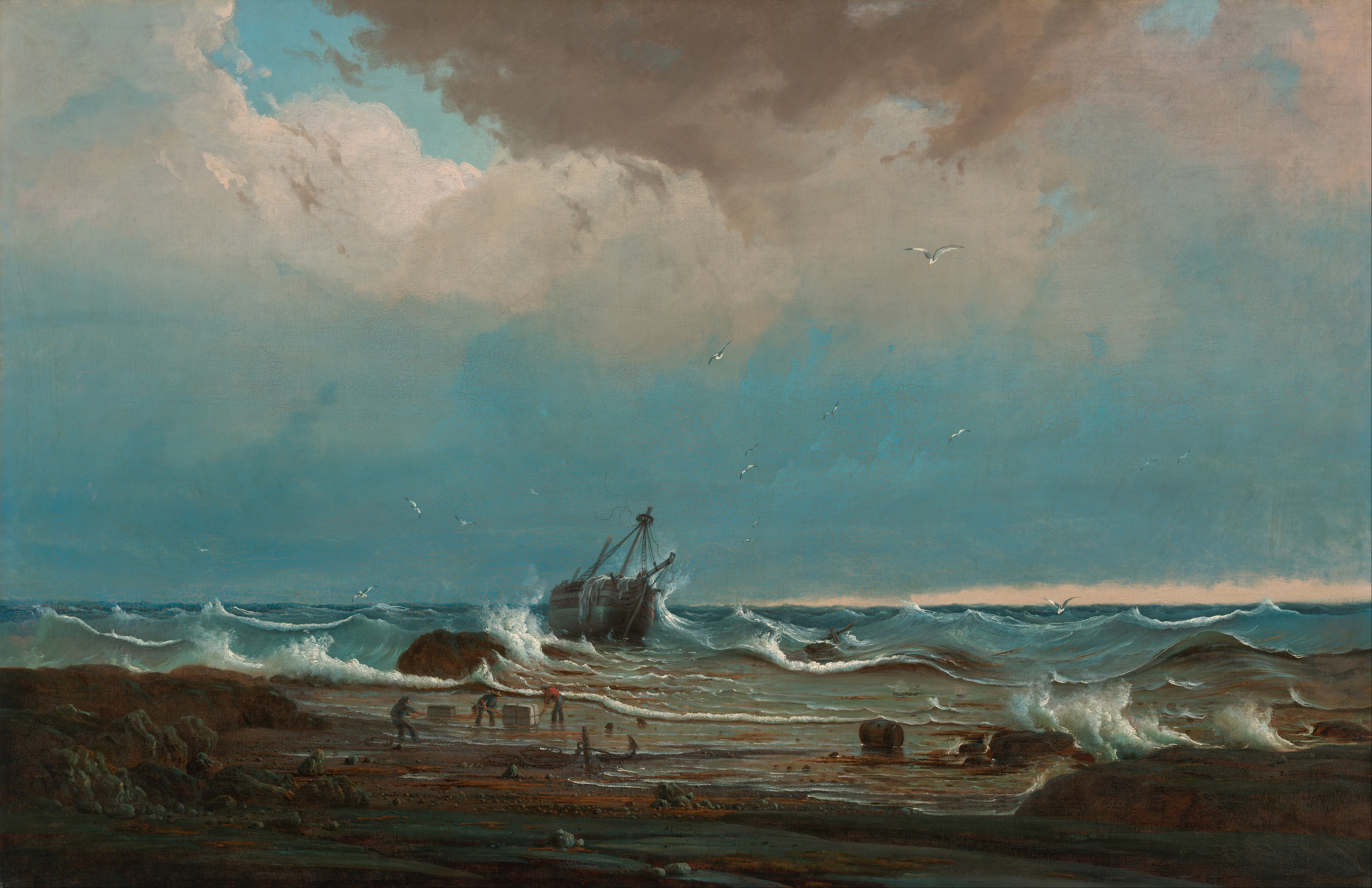
- The Wreck of HMS George III
- Born: 10 September 1811; Bergen, Norway
- Died: 23 December 1889 (aged 78); Sydney, Australia
- Occupation: Painter
- Relatives: Ole Bull (brother); Georg Andreas Bull (brother)

Knud Geelmuyden Bull (10 September 1811 – 23 December 1889) was a Norwegian painter and counterfeiter. He studied as a painter, was convicted for printing false bank notes, and was deported from the United Kingdom to Australia during 1846. He lived in Australia the remainder of his life, becoming a significant artistic painter there.

== Background ==
Bull was born in Norway in Bergen, a son of pharmacist Johan Storm Bull and his wife Anna Dorothea Borse Geelmuyden. He was a brother of violinist Ole Bull and architect Georg Andreas Bull. He was an uncle of Edvard Hagerup Bull, Schak Bull and Henrik Bull, a granduncle of Sverre Hagerup Bull and a second cousin of Johan Randulf Bull and Anders Sandøe Ørsted Bull. He studied painting with J. C. Dahl in Dresden from 1833 to 1834.

== Deportation to Australia ==
While visiting Great Britain in 1845, Bull was caught for having prepared equipment for printing false bank notes. In a trial at the Central Criminal Court in London during December 1845 he was sentenced to fourteen years deportation to Australia. He left Great Britain in May 1846, in the prison ship John Calvin. He was given an opportunity to paint during the journey, and among his products were the paintings The Wreck of the Waterloo at Cape Town in 1842 (1846, The Mitchell Library, Sydney) and Aboard the John Calvin in the N.E. Trades near Madeira (1846, privately owned, Australia). He came to Norfolk Island in September 1846, and was transferred to the penal colony Saltwater River, Tasmania in 1847. He spent several years in Hobart from 1849 and was finally released from custody during 1853.

== Painting career in Australia ==
There were few painters in Australia at the time, and Bull was the only professional landscape painter in Hobart. During the 1850s he was a teacher at the William Slade Smith Academy, and also painted local landscapes, and is noted for his scenes of early colonial Hobart. Bull is regarded as a pioneer of Australian landscape painting and is represented in several major galleries in Australia. Among his paintings are Henry Chapman' (1854, Tasmanian Museum and Art Gallery), Hobart Town and Mount Nelson (1854, Allport Library and Museum of Fine Arts) and Sunrise (1856, Tasmanian Museum and Art Gallery) . Bull also created historical paintings, such as The Wreck of the George III (1850) which is now displayed in the National Gallery of Australia at Canberra.

== Personal life ==
He married Mary Ann Bryen (1837–1879) in Hobart, Tasmania, in 1852. He died in December 1889 in Sydney, Australia. He had five sons who all became painters, except one who died as a 2-year old.

== See also ==
- List of convicts transported to Australia

== Biography ==
- Ragnar Kvam: Straffen (1999)
