= Nesbyen Church =

Church in Buskerud, Norway

- Nesbyen kirke
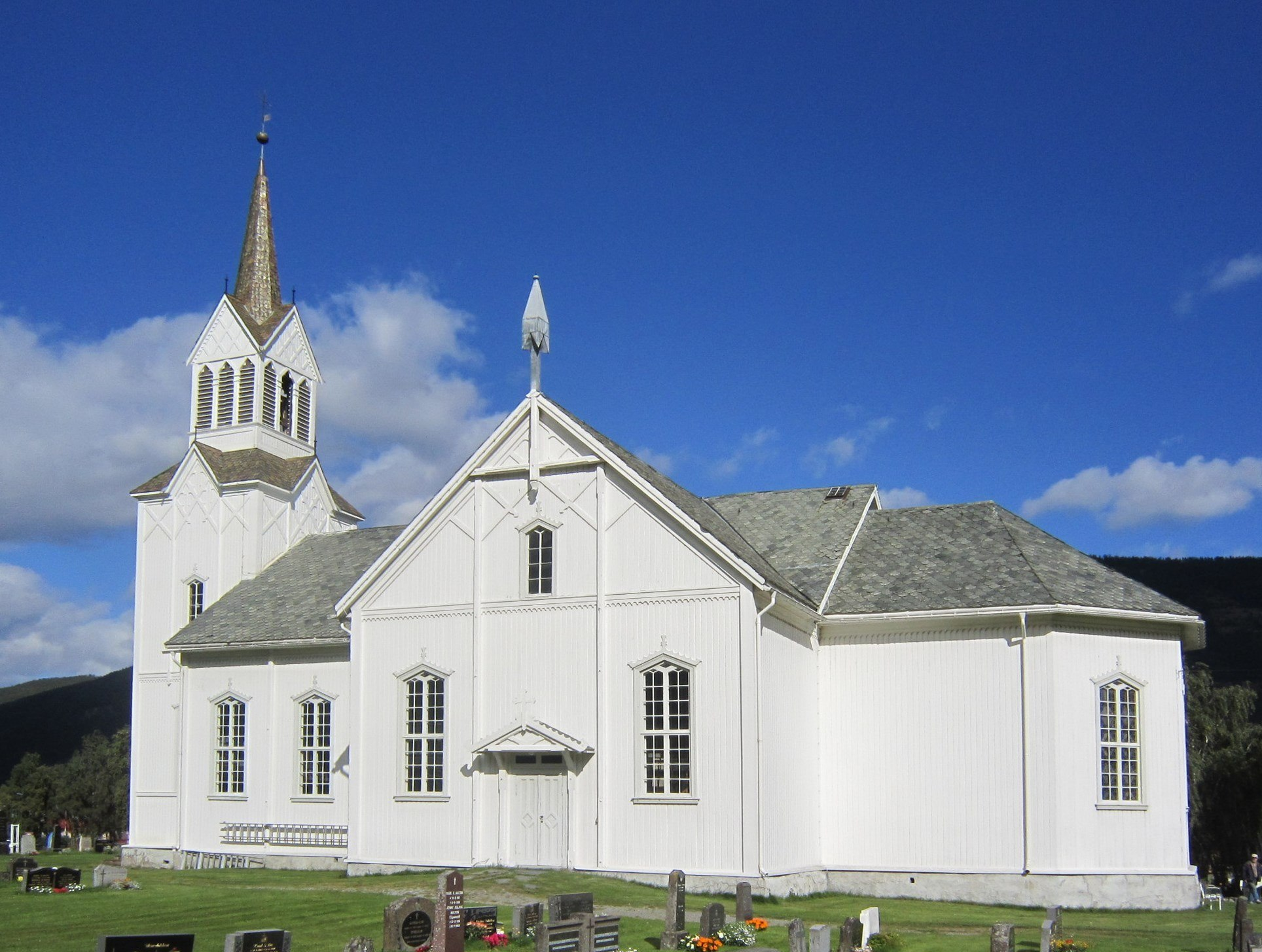
- View of the church
- Nesbyen Church
- 60°34′01″N 9°06′13″E
- Location: Nesbyen, Buskerud
- Country: Norway
- Denomination: Church of Norway
- Previous denomination: Catholic Church
- Churchmanship: Evangelical Lutheran

History
- Former name: Nes kirke
- Status: Parish church
- Founded: 13th century
- Consecrated: 1861

Architecture
- Functional status: Active
- Architect: Georg Andreas Bull
- Architectural type: Cruciform
- Completed: 1861 (165 years ago)

Specifications
- Capacity: 420
- Materials: Wood

Administration
- Diocese: Tunsberg
- Deanery: Hallingdal prosti
- Parish: Nesbyen
- Norwegian Cultural Heritage Site
- Type: Church
- Status: Not protected
- ID: 85116

Nesbyen Church (Norwegian: Nesbyen kirke) is a parish church of the Church of Norway in Nesbyen Municipality in Buskerud county, Norway. It is located in the town of Nesbyen. It is the church for the Nesbyen parish which is part of the Hallingdal prosti (deanery) in the Diocese of Tunsberg. The white, wooden church was built in a cruciform design in 1861 using plans drawn up by the architect Georg Andreas Bull. The church seats about 420 people.

Nesbyen Church was known as "Nes Church" until 1 April 2024. It was renamed after the municipality changed its name from Nes to Nesbyen. The church is Hallingdal's largest church and because of this, it is sometimes nicknamed the "Hallingdal Cathedral".

== History ==
The earliest existing historical records of the church date back to the year 1430, but the church was not built that year. The first church in Nesbyen was a small wooden church that was probably built in the early 13th century on a site about 500 metres (1,600 ft) west of the present-day church site. It was a small building roughly in the shape of a square about 8.8 metres (29 ft) on each side. It was probably just a nave with no chancel. This church burned down in the mid- to late-13th century. Evidence of this church was discovered in 1965 during archaeological research on the site. After the fire, a second church was built. This one was a wooden stave church with a rectangular nave and a narrower, rectangular chancel with an apse. During the late 1700s, the church was enlarged by adding transepts to the north and south of the nave, creating a cruciform design. A new church porch was added to the west end of the nave and a sacristy was also added to the east end of the chancel.

In 1814, this church served as an election church (Norwegian: valgkirke). Together with more than 300 other parish churches across Norway, it was a polling station for elections to the 1814 Norwegian Constituent Assembly which wrote the Constitution of Norway. This was Norway's first national election. Each church parish was a constituency that elected people called "electors" who later met together in each county to elect the representatives for the assembly that was to meet at Eidsvoll Manor later that year.

In the 1850s, the parish determined that the old stave church was too small for the congregation, so they began planning for a new church. For a while, there was talk of building a large stone church in the old cemetery, but this was deemed too expensive. After that, new plans were prepared by the architect Georg Andreas Bull on a site about 500 metres (1,600 ft) east of the old stave church. The new church was consecrated in 1862 and some time after that, the old stave church was torn down. The new church is a wooden cruciform church with a tower at the entrance. The church has a sacristy in the corner between the northeast transept and the choir. The transepts have small decorative finials on the ridge edges.

== Media gallery ==
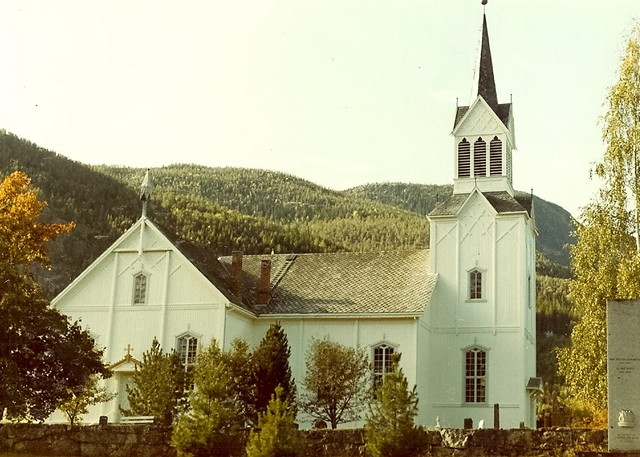

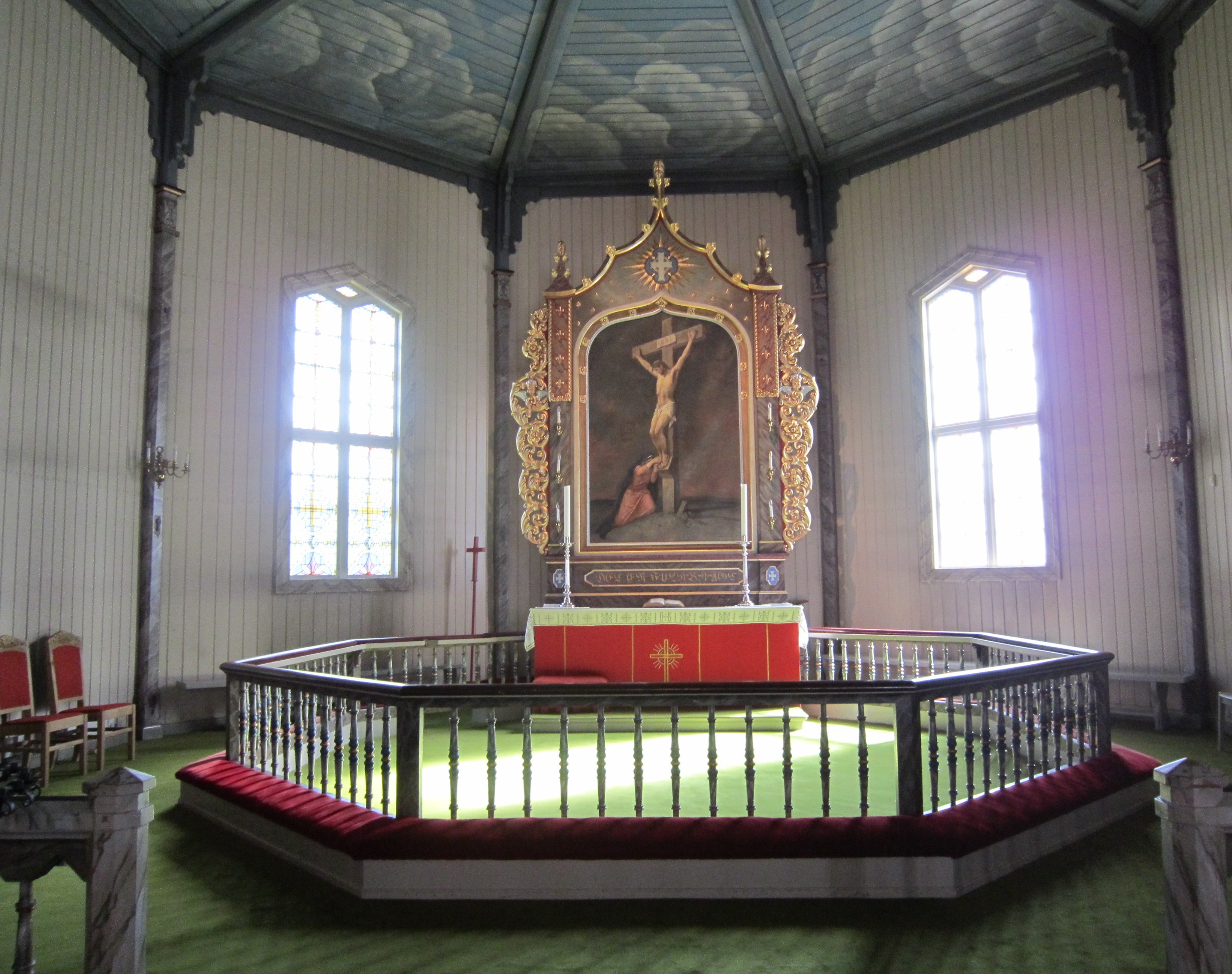

The old stave church

The old stave church

== See also ==
- List of churches in Tunsberg
