= Peter Munch =

Peter Munch may refer to:

- Peter Andreas Munch (1810–1863), Norwegian historian
- Peter Rochegune Munch (1870–1948), Danish historian and politician
- Peter A. Munch (1908–1984), Norwegian-American sociologist, educator and author
