= Yngvar Hagen =

Norwegian zoologist

Yngvar Hagen (September 24, 1909 – March 22, 1993) was a Norwegian zoologist.

== Biography ==
Hagen was born in Fredrikstad, Norway.

From 1937 to 1938 he participated in the Norwegian Scientific Expedition to Tristan da Cunha in the southern Atlantic Ocean. The material of this expedition was used in his doctoral dissertation Birds of Tristan da Cunha (1952).

Hagen worked both at the University of Oslo and at the Royal Norwegian Society of Science and Letters, the Museum (DKNVS, Museet), was the chairman of the Norwegian Zoological Society (Norsk Zoologisk Forening) from 1955 to 1958, and was a manager at the Norwegian National Wildlife Survey (Statens Viltundersøkelser), conducting wildlife surveys, from 1955 to 1977.

In Norway, he is best known for Rovfuglene og viltpleien (Birds of Prey and Game Management, 1952), which generated discussion about the place of raptors in nature.
