= Norwegian Scientific Expedition to Tristan Da Cunha =

The Norwegian Scientific Expedition to Tristan Da Cunha was a scientific and cultural exploration of the most remote inhabited archipelago in the world, in the south Atlantic Ocean, 2,000 kilometres (1,200 mi) from the nearest inhabited land, Saint Helena. The expedition arrived on the island in December 1937 and left in March 1938.

== History ==
Captained by botanist Erling Christophersen, the thirteen man crew included three University of Oslo Ph.D. students conducting research for their dissertations, which were published shortly after their return; these included sociologist Peter A. Munch, ornithologist Yngvar Hagen, and phycologist Egil Baardseth. Also among the crew were a geologist, a marine biologist, an ichthyologist, a dentist, and a doctor. A late addition to the crew was topological surveyor Allan Crawford, a British engineer who was recruited by the captain en route to Cape Town, and who would later come to be regarded as a leading authority on Tristan Da Cunha.

Based on observations made during the voyage, Christophersen published Tristan da Cunha, the Lonely Isle (1938) and the comprehensive Norwegian Scientific Expedition to Tristan Da Cunha, 1937-1938 (1945), while the Ph.D. students published their work and achieved their degrees. Munch published Sociology of Tristan da Cunha (1946), Hagen published Birds of Tristan da Cunha (1952), and Baardseth published The Marine Algae of Tristan da Cunha (1941).

== Sources ==
- Erling Christophersen, Results of the Norwegian Scientific Expedition to Tristan da Cunha, 1937-1938, (Oslo: Norske videnskaps-akademi, 1946). ISSN 0370-6540.
