= Christian Sørenssen =

Norwegian politician

Rt. Rev. Christian Sørenssen
- Bishop
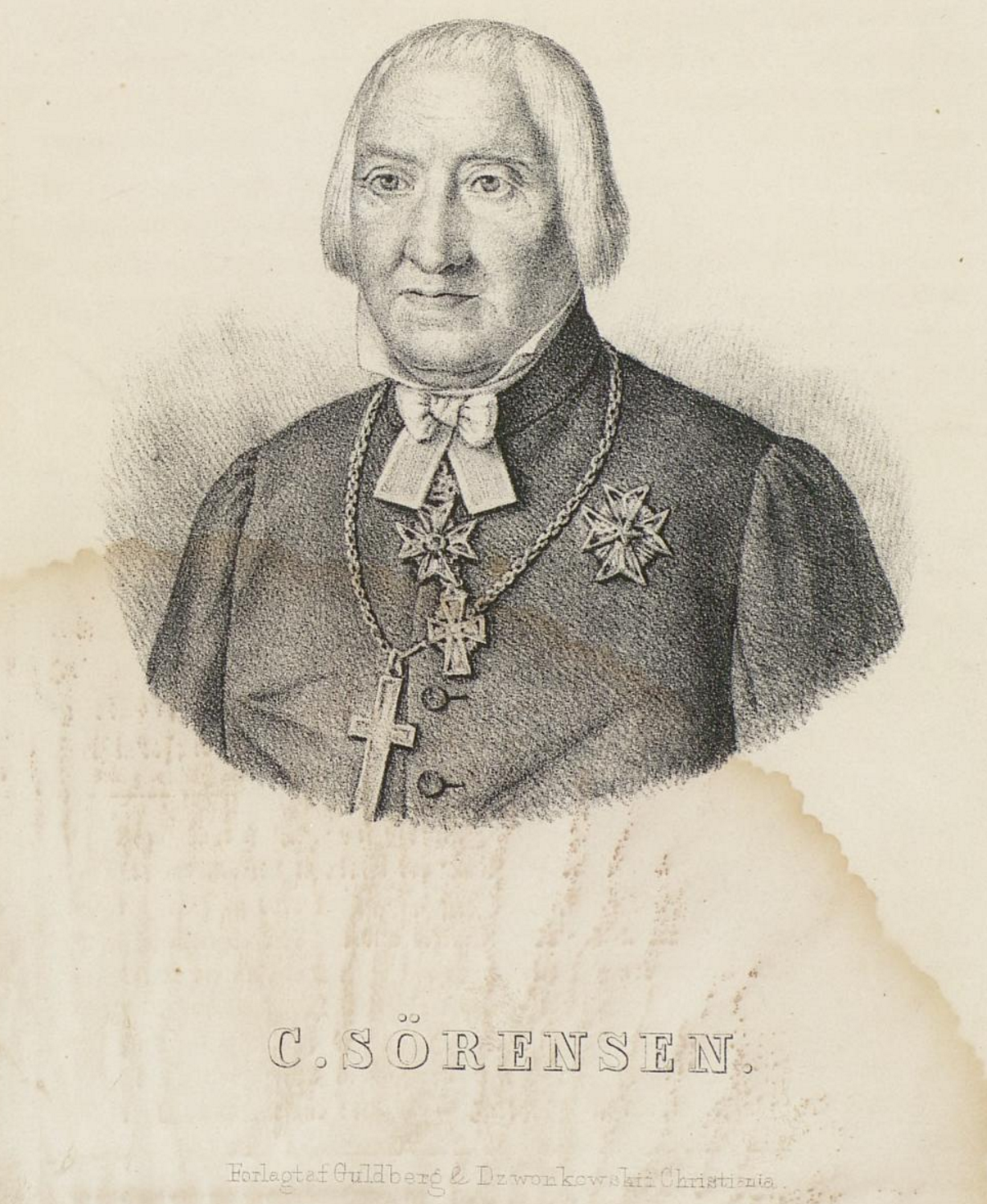
- Lithograph of Christian Sørenssen
- Church: Church of Norway
- Diocese: Christianssand and Christiania
- Appointed: 1811

Personal details
- Born: 25 September 1765 Christianssand, Norway
- Died: 16 August 1845 (aged 79) Smaalenene, Norway
- Denomination: Christian
- Parents: Søren Christensen and Christence (Anna) Abrahamsdatter Just
- Spouse: 1) Tete Sophie Wilhelmine Fangen 2) Antonette Wilhelmine Fangen
- Children: Søren Anton Wilhelm Sørenssen
- Occupation: Priest
- Education: Cand.theol.
- Alma mater: University of Copenhagen

Christian Sørenssen (born 25 September 1765 in Christiansand, died 16 August 1845 in Våler) was a Norwegian theologian, politician, and Bishop of the Church of Norway. He was bishop of the Diocese of Christianssand from 1811 until 1823 when he was appointed as the bishop of the Diocese of Christiania, a post which he held until his death in 1845.

== Life ==
Christian Sørenssen was born on 25 September 1765 in the city of Christiansand in southern Norway to Søren Christensen, a blacksmith, and Christence (Anna) Abrahamsdatter Just. Sørenssen received his cand.theol. in 1785 from the University of Copenhagen.

He worked as a teacher in his home town of Christianssand until 1791. He then moved to Strømsø (in Drammen) and was an assistant priest and rector of the Latin school there. In 1797, he became the parish priest at Risør Church in the town of Risør. In 1804, he was given the job as the vicar for the Christiansand Cathedral. On 11 April 1811, he was appointed to be bishop of the Diocese of Christianssand. Sørenssen was the last Norwegian bishop to be ordained in Copenhagen since Norway gained its independence from Denmark in 1814. The bishopric covered all of the counties of Stavanger, Lister og Mandal, Nedenæs, and Telemark at that time.

From 1814 to 1817, he was a representative of the city of Christianssand at the first two Parliaments that met in Norway after independence in 1814. He did not have a special interest in politics, and did not speak at any of the meetings of Parliament.

In 1823, he was appointed bishop of the Diocese of Christiania. He held this position until his death in 1845. The Diocese of Akershus (at that time) included all of the capital of Christiania as well as the counties of Hedemarken, Christians amt, and Jarlsberg og Larvik.

He died on 16 August 1845, while traveling in the county of Smaalenene on the road between Moss and Son on a visit.

== Memberships and honors ==
In 1811, he became a member of the Royal Norwegian Society of Sciences and Letters. From 1823 until his death in 1845, he was the chairman of the board of the Norwegian Bible Society. He was a Knight of the Danish Order of the Dannebrog and a Commander of the Swedish Order of the Polar Star.

Church of Norway titles
Preceded by Johan Michael Keyser	Bishop of Christianssand; 1811–1822	Succeeded by Johan Storm Munch
Preceded by Frederik Julius Bech	Bishop of Akershus; 1823–1845	Succeeded by Jens Lauritz Arup
