= Norwegian Booksellers Association =

Norwegian interest group

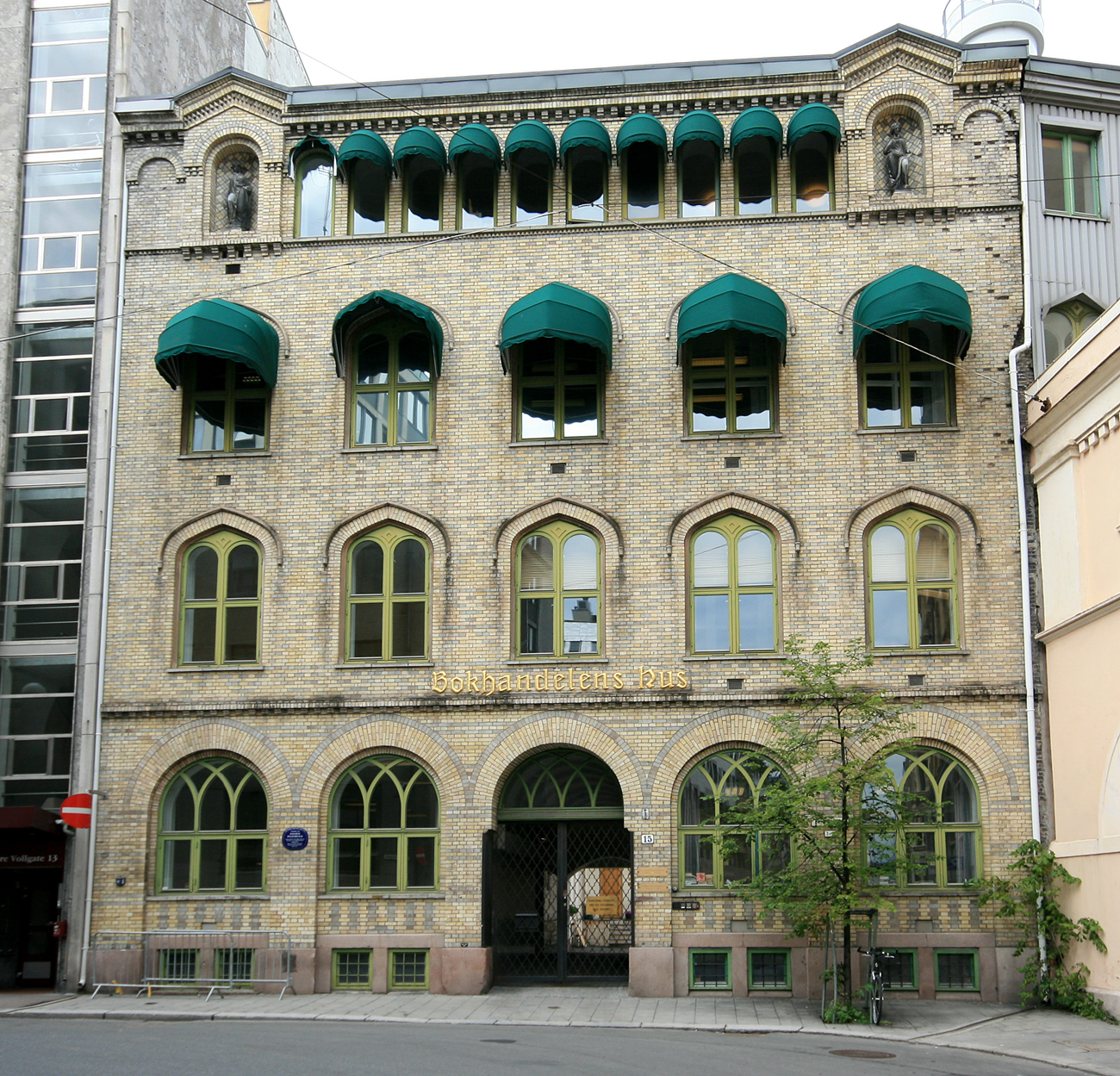
Their headquarters in Øvre Vollgate, Oslo.

The Norwegian Booksellers Association (Norwegian: Den norske Bokhandlerforening) is a Norwegian interest group. Its purpose is "looking after the interests of the booksellers and working to strengthen the position of literature and books in society". It awards the annual Norwegian Booksellers' Prize (Bokhandlerprisen).

It was founded on 10 January 1851. The first chairman, who served until 1870, was Jørgen Wright Cappelen. Peter Tidemand Malling succeeded him and served as chair from 1870 to 1878. Later Torger Baardseth was chairman of the Norwegian Booksellers Association from 1902 to 1916. The current board chairman is Siri Strömmevold.
