= Christiania Dampkjøkken =

Norwegian catering company

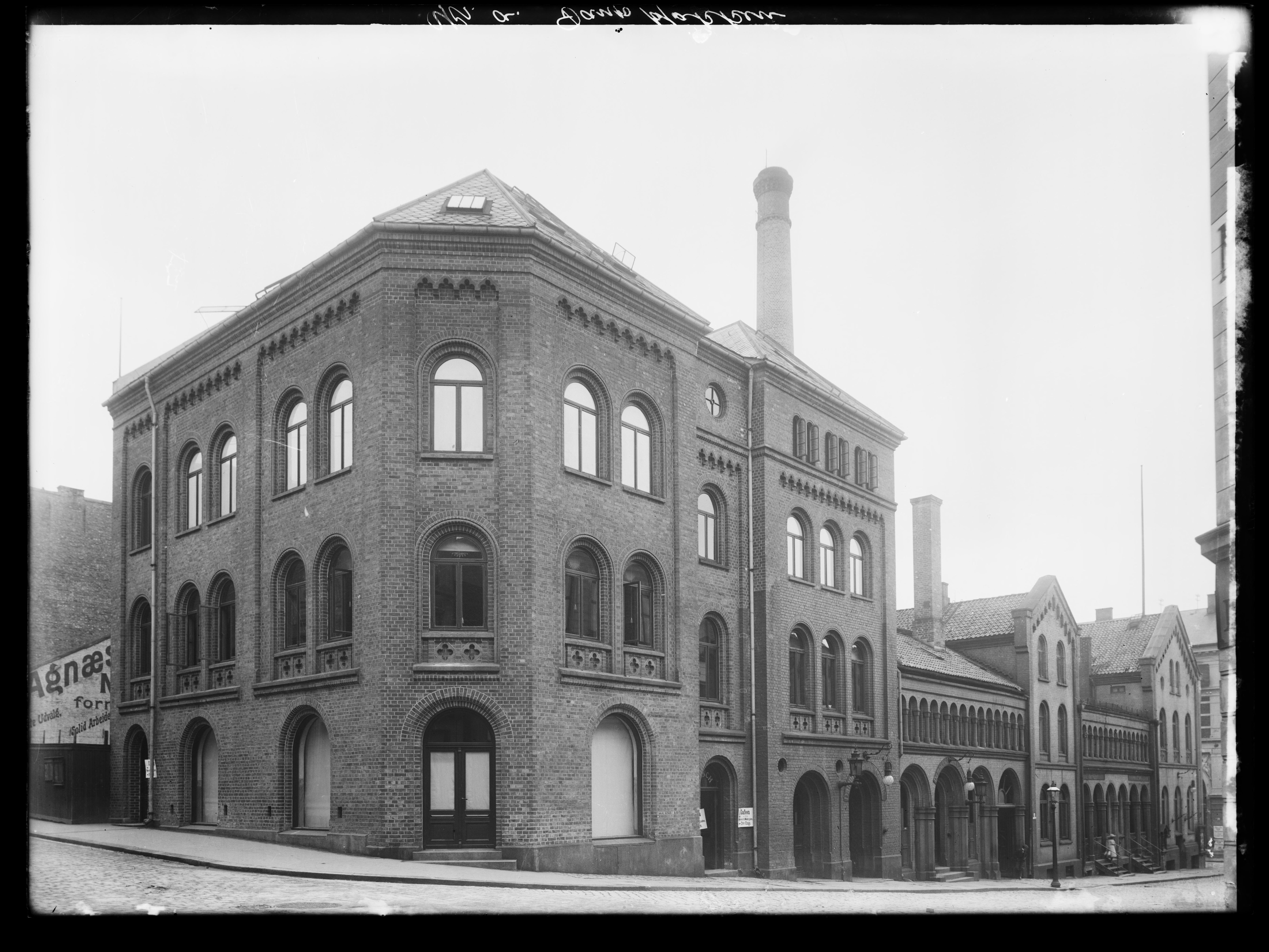
Christiania Dampkjøkken, 1920

Christiania Dampkjøkken was a kitchen and catering company established in Christiania, Norway, in 1857. They opened their kitchen in 1858, in Torggata 8 in Christiania. The company philosophy was to offer cheap quality food, served in large open rooms. The company building was designed by architect Georg Andreas Bull. The kitchen was popular among both poor and wealthy persons. Among the guests who later became famous cultural personalities were Knut Hamsun, Henrik Ibsen, Aasmund Olavsson Vinje, Hans Jæger, Arne Garborg and Christian Skredsvig. Among royal visitors were King Oscar II, German Emperor Wilhelm II and Prince Henry of Prussia. The company profile gradually developed from soup kitchen into catering, and was eventually taken over by the company SAS Service Partner.
