= Mette Bull =

Norwegian actress (1876–1946)

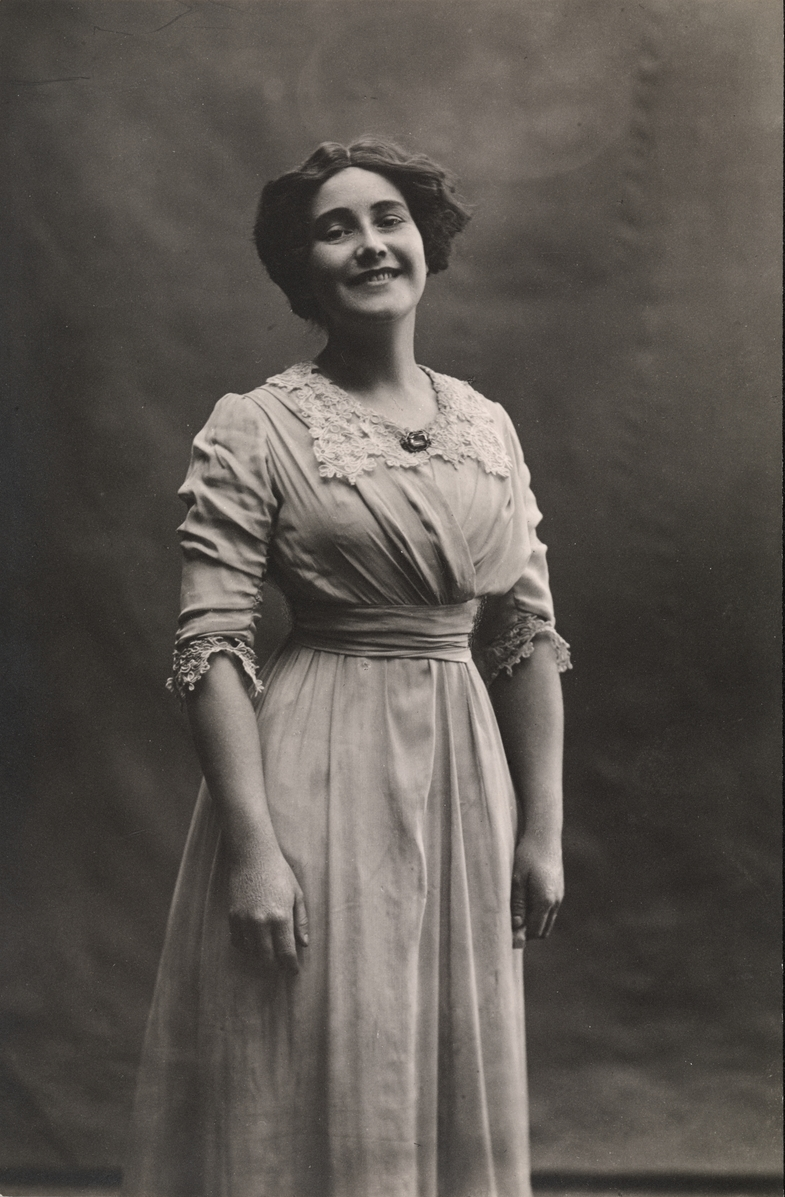
- Mette Bull as Phyllis in Da vi var en og tyve at National Theatre (1909)
- Born: Mette Marie Wang; 31 January 1876; Christiania, Norway
- Died: 14 January 1946 (aged 69)
- Spouses: Jens Elias Berntsen (m. 1897); Henrik Bull (m. 1905)

Mette Marie Bull (née Wang; 31 January 1876 – 14 January 1946) was a Norwegian actress.

== Early life ==
Mette Marie Wang was born on 31 January 1876 in Christiania (now Oslo) to merchant Hans Emanuel Wang (1839–1918) and Anne Kathrine Tandberg (1839–1898).

== Career ==
She made her acting debut in February 1899 as Susanne in a production of Thérèse Raquin at the Eldorado Theatre in Oslo.

From 1899, with a few interruptions, Bull was employed at the National Theatre and in 1916, participated in its guest play in Stockholm. Among her leading roles were Pernille in The Fidget and Elina in Ved Rigets Port.

== Personal life ==
On 18 December 1897, she married opera singer Jens Elias Berntsen, but the marriage was later dissolved. She later married architect Henrik Bull on 8 May 1905.

Bull died on 14 January 1946 at the age of 69. She was buried at Cemetery of Our Saviour on 26 August 1946.
