= Edvard Hagerup Bull (composer) =

Norwegian composer (1922–2012)

Edvard Hagerup Bull (10 June 1922 – 15 March 2012) was a Norwegian composer.

He was born in Bergen. He grew up in Jar outside Oslo in a musical and politically active family, the son of Sverre Hagerup Bull and his wife Aldis Jebsen. His paternal grandfather was politician and judge Edvard Hagerup Bull, who was a cousin of the composer Edvard Hagerup Grieg. During September 1955 he married Anna Kvarme.

Bull studied at the Norwegian Academy of Music in Oslo and at the Conservatoire de Paris where he won the 1952 Prix de Composition Musicale. He was awarded the prize for musical composition from the Conservatoire National Supérieur de Musique de Paris. He had additional training with the Austrian-born musicologist, Josef Rufer. Other teachers include Jean Rivier and Olivier Messiaen. His teacher Darius Milhaud described him as "a musician with a solid technique and a truly very enthralling, vigorous and highly imaginative personality".

Edvard Hagerup Bull became a notable composer. He wrote two operas and thirty orchestral works and chamber music.

== Selected works ==
- Den standhaftige tindsoldat, 1948–49
- Sinfonia di Teatro 1950
- Concerto N°1 pour trompette et orchestre, 1950
- Escapades, orkestersuite, 1952
- Marionettes sérieuses, 1960
- Concerto N°2 pour trompette et orchestre, 1960
- Epilogue for strykere, 1961
- Münchhausen, 1961
- Accents for klaver, 1968
- Fløytekonsert, 1969
- Fyrtøiet, 1973–74
- Den grimme ælling, 1972–77
- Variantes multi-métriques for klaver, 1975
- Chant d'Hommage à Jean Rivier for orkester, 1976
- Prélude con Fuoco for klaver, 1978
- Den Grimme Ælling (Opera) 1972–77
- Fyrtøyet (Opera) 1973–74

External image
- Portrait
