= Troldhaugen =

Former home of Edvard Grieg in Bergen, Norway

Coordinates: 60°19′10.56″N 5°19′46.12″E

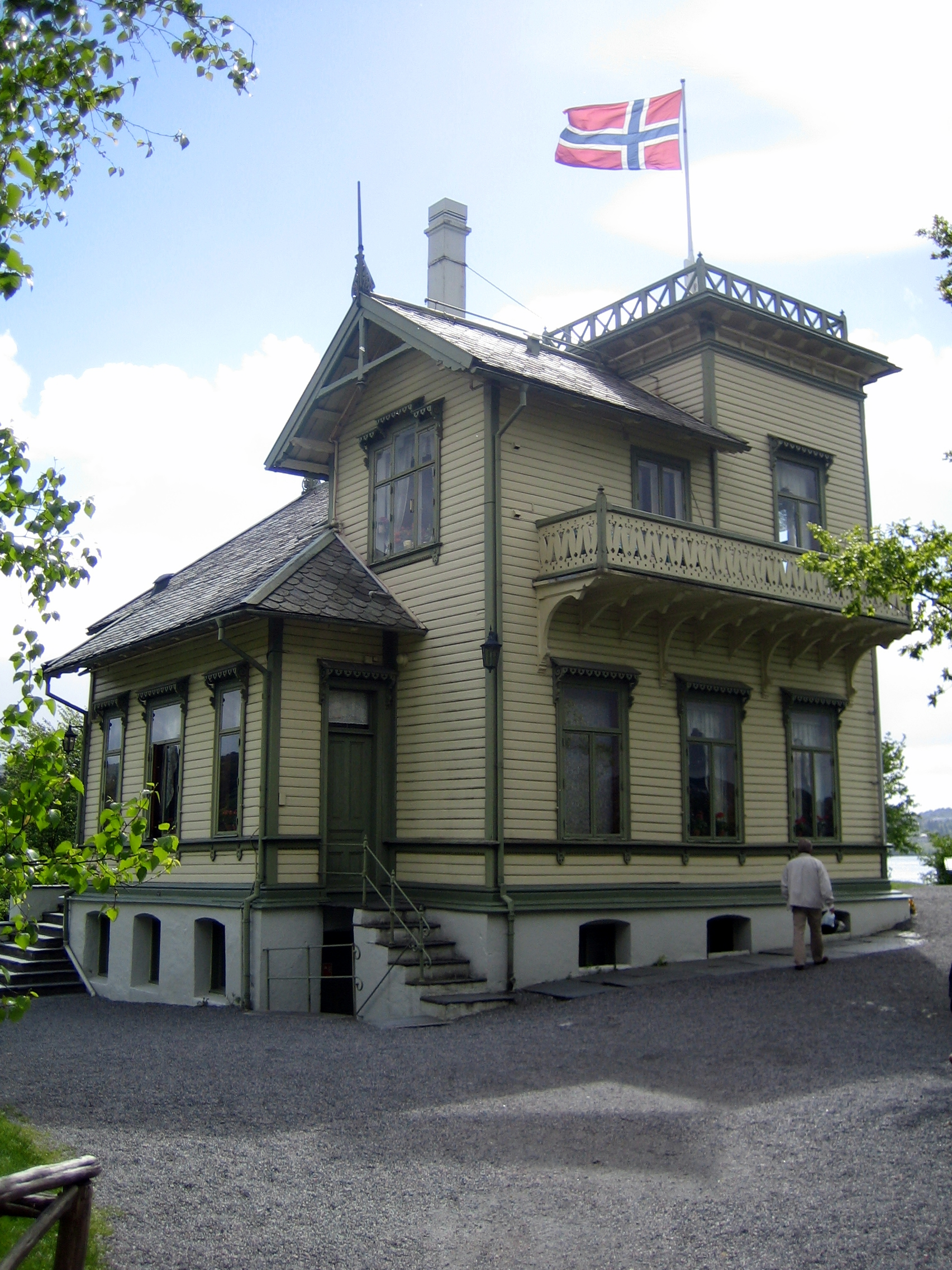
Troldhaugen

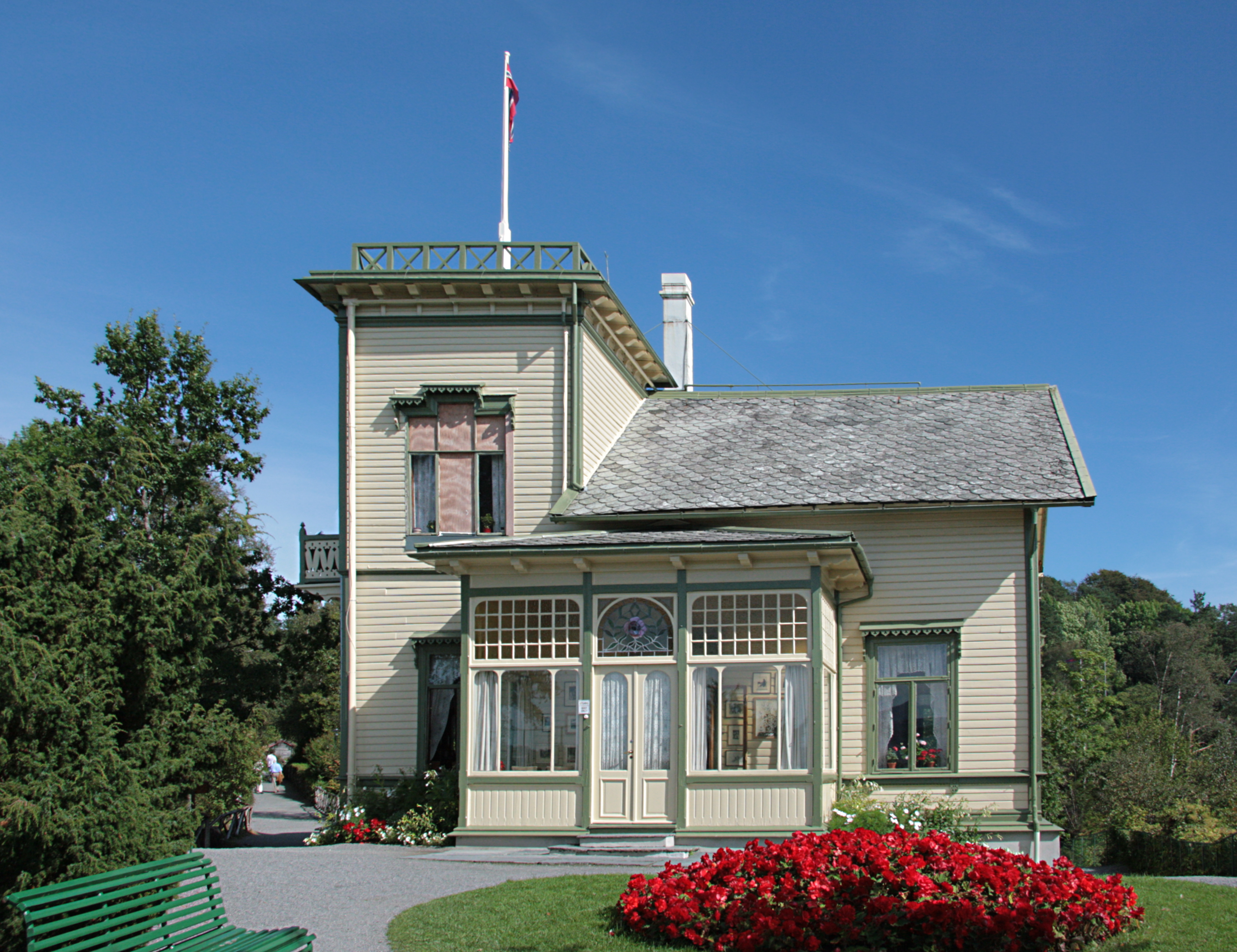
Troldhaugen

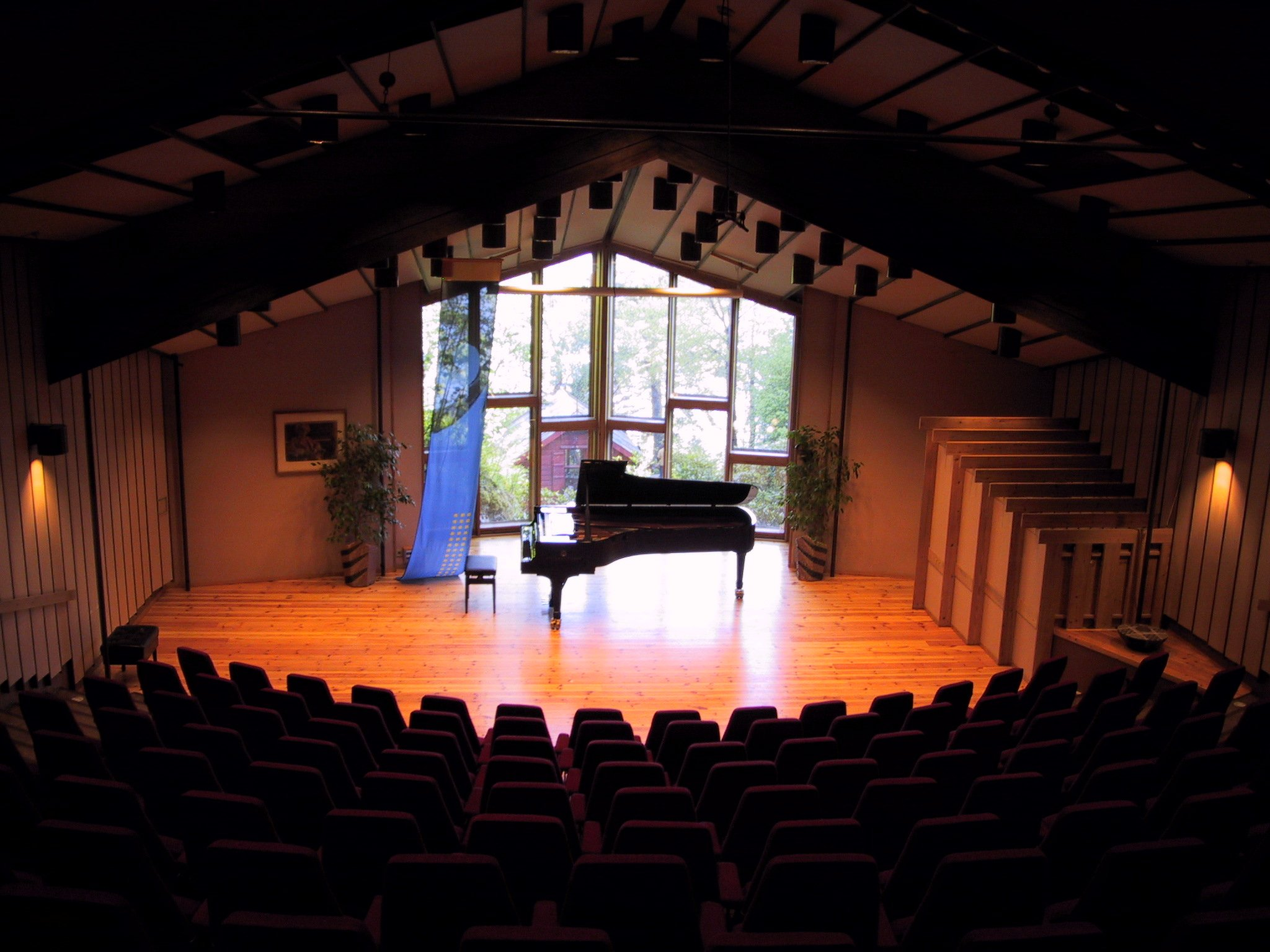
The podium in Troldsalen

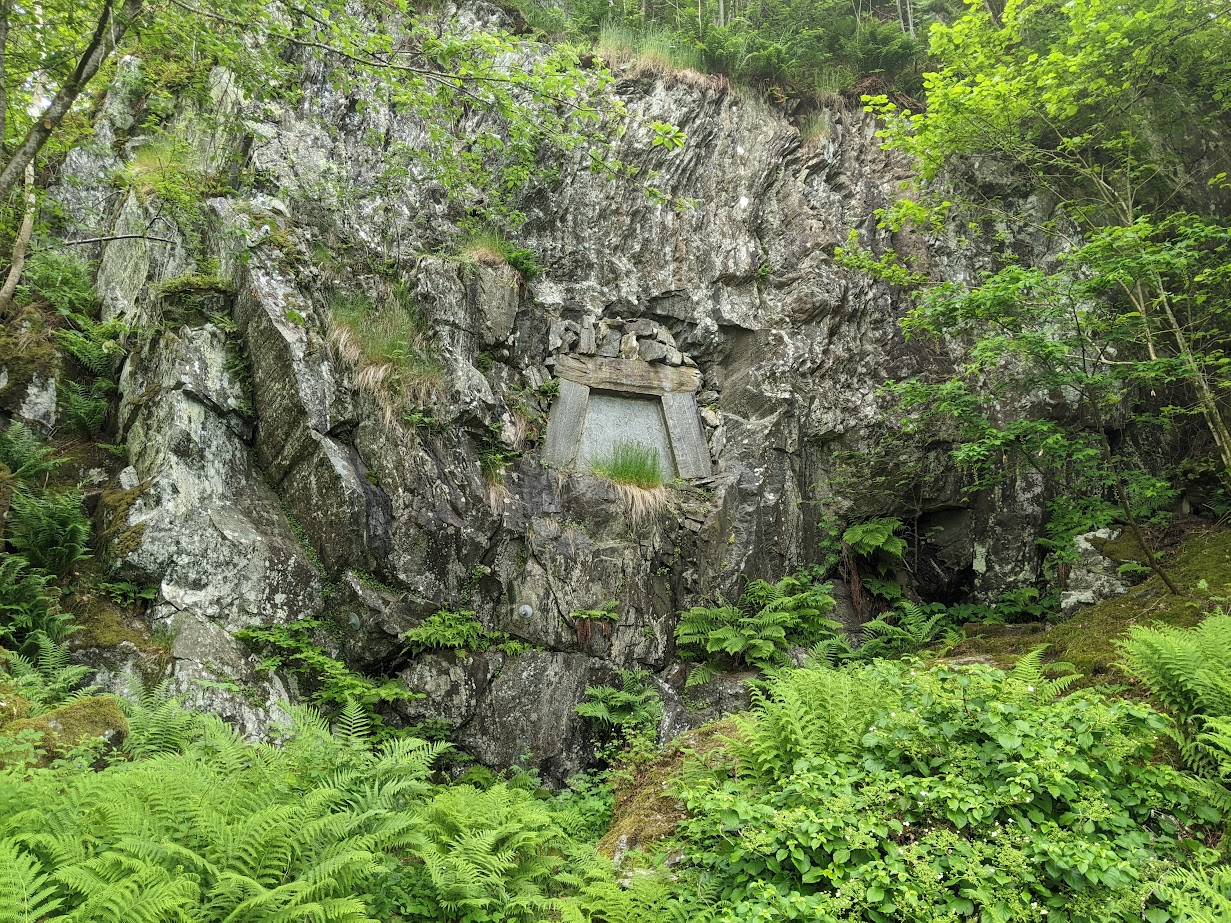
Grieg gravesite, Troldhaugen, Norway

Troldhaugen is the former home of Norwegian composer Edvard Grieg and his wife Nina Grieg. Troldhaugen is located in Bergen, Norway and consists of the Edvard Grieg Museum, Grieg's villa, the hut where he composed music, and his and his wife's gravesite.

== Background ==
The building was designed by Grieg's cousin, the architect Schak Bull. The name comes from trold meaning troll and haug from the Old Norse word haugr meaning hill or knoll. Grieg is reputed to have said that the children called the nearby small valley "The Valley of Trolls" and thus gave the name for his building as well.

Edvard and Nina Grieg finished building Troldhaugen in 1885. Edvard and Nina Grieg lived in Troldhaugen when he was home in Norway, mostly in the summer. Troldhaugen was the home of Edvard Grieg from April 1885 to his death. After the death of her husband in 1907, Nina Grieg moved to Denmark, where she spent the remainder of her life. Grieg's and his wife's ashes rest inside a mountain tomb near the house.

Troldhaugen is a 19th-century residence with a panoramic tower and a large veranda. Grieg's small composer's hut overlooks Nordås Lake. Grieg included the name of his home in his piano piece, Wedding Day at Troldhaugen, Opus 65, No. 6.

== Edvard Grieg Museum Troldhaugen ==
Troldhaugen and its surroundings are now operated as the Edvard Grieg Museum Troldhaugen, which is dedicated to the memory of Edvard Grieg. In 1995, a museum building was added, with a permanent exhibition of Edvard Grieg's life and music, as well as a shop and restaurant. In the villa's living room stands Grieg's own Steinway grand piano, which he was given as a silver wedding anniversary present in 1892. Today the instrument is used for private concerts, special occasions, and intimate concerts held in connection with Bergen International Festival. In addition, the noted Norwegian pianist Leif Ove Andsnes has recorded an album of selections from Grieg's ten volumes of Lyric Pieces.

Troldsalen, a concert hall completed in 1985, offers concert series in the summer and autumn months, and other concerts and events.

== See also ==
- List of music museums

== Other sources ==
- Torsteinson, Sigmund (1978) Femti ar med Troldhaugen: Glimt fra museumstiden 1928-1978 (Gyldendal)
- Torsteinson, Sigmund (1960) Troldhaugen med en kort biografi om Edvard Grieg (John Grieg)
- Kayser, Audun (1980) Troldhaugen: Nina and Edvard Griegs home (John Grieg)
- Nordhagen, Per Jonas (1992) Bergen Guide & Handbook (Bergensia-forlaget) ISBN 82-91104-01-8
