= Henrik Bull =

Norwegian architect (1864–1953)

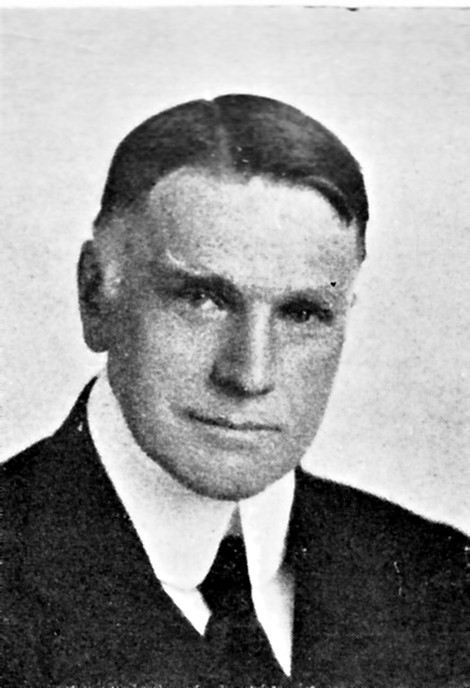
- Henrik Bull
- Born: 28 March 1864; Christiania, Norway
- Died: 2 June 1953 (aged 89); Oslo, Norway
- Occupation: Architect
- Spouse: Mette Bull (m. 1905; died 1946)
- Parent: Georg Andreas Bull
- Relatives: Ole Bull (uncle); Knud Bull (uncle); Edvard Hagerup Bull (cousin); Schak Bull (cousin)

Henrik Bull (28 March 1864 – 2 June 1953) was a Norwegian architect and designer. Among his works are the Paulus Church at Grünerløkka in Oslo, the National Theater, the Historical Museum in Oslo, and the Government Building. He also designed coins for Norges Bank, and participated at the Kristiania Jubilée exhibition at Frogner during 1914. He directed the Norwegian National Academy of Craft and Art Industry from 1912 to 1934.

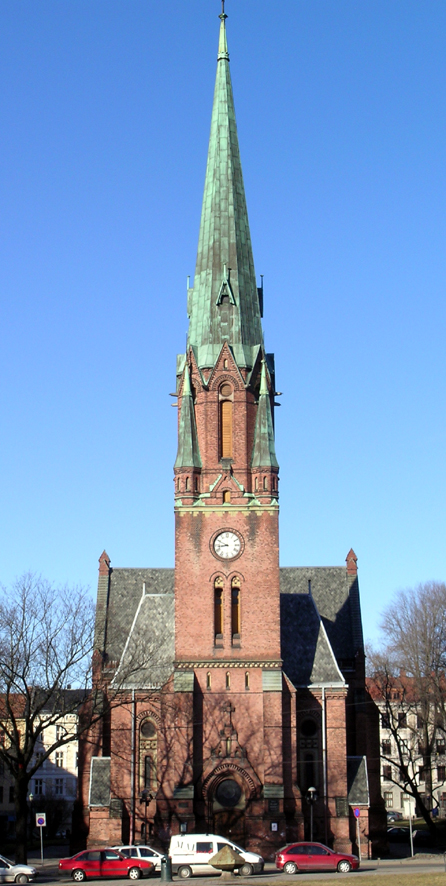
Paulus Church, Oslo.

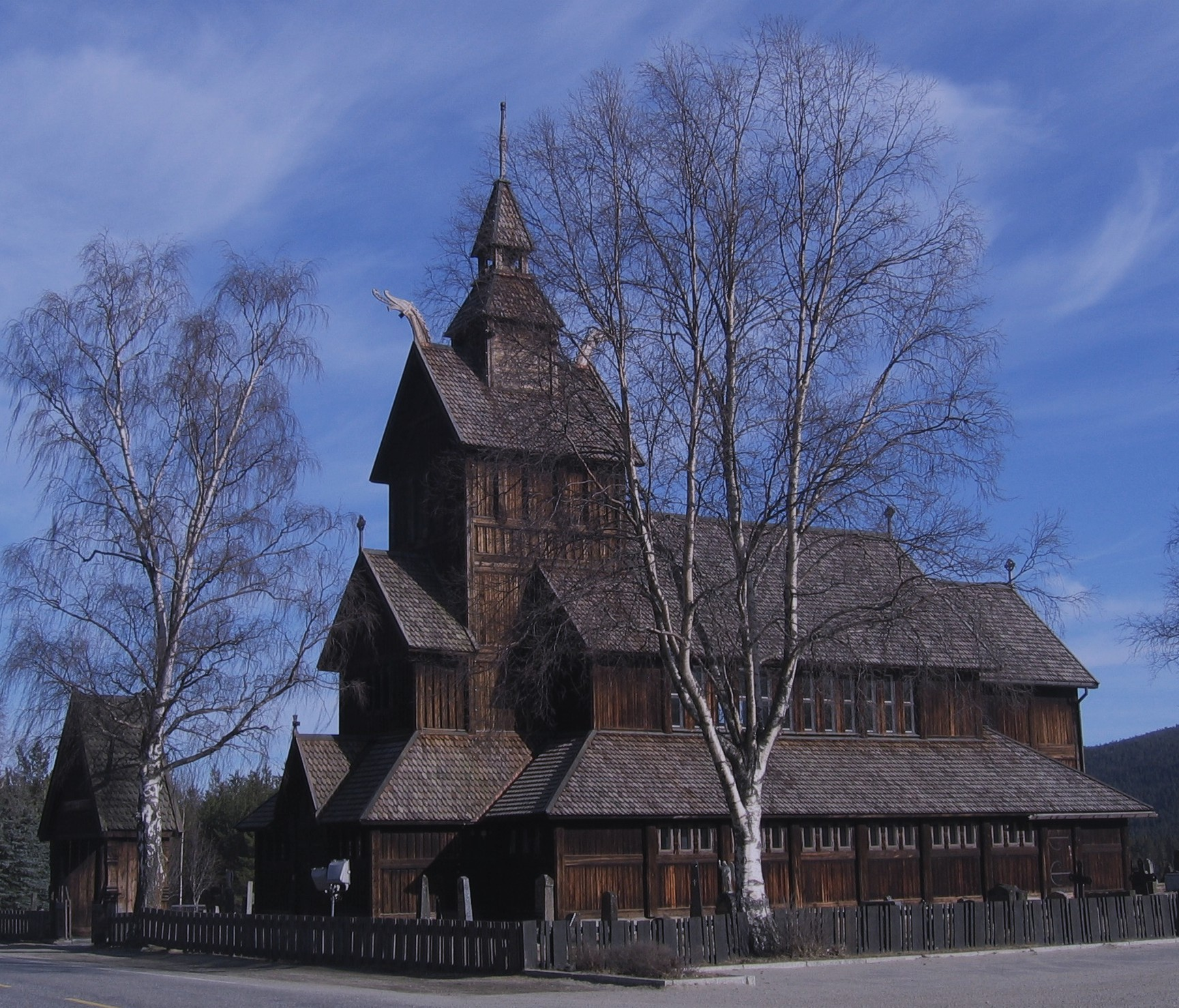
Uvdal Church, Uvdal.

== Early and personal life ==
Bull was born in Christiania as the son of architect Georg Andreas Bull and Emilie Constance Hjelm. His father was among the major architects in the country, was chief building inspector in Christiania for forty years, and performed surveying and archeological research. Bull married actress Mette Marie Berntsen Wang in 1905. He was a nephew of violinist Ole Bull and Knud Bull, and a first cousin of judge and politician Edvard Hagerup Bull and architect Schak Bull.

== Works ==
=== Churches ===
Bull's first major commission was the Paulus Church in Kristiania. This church, built in Gothic Revival style, is located at Grünerløkka, and was finished during 1892. He also did research work on the old stave churches. His Uvdal Church was built in romantic style, and finished during 1893. Another of his works was the Åmot Church at Rena, a timber church.

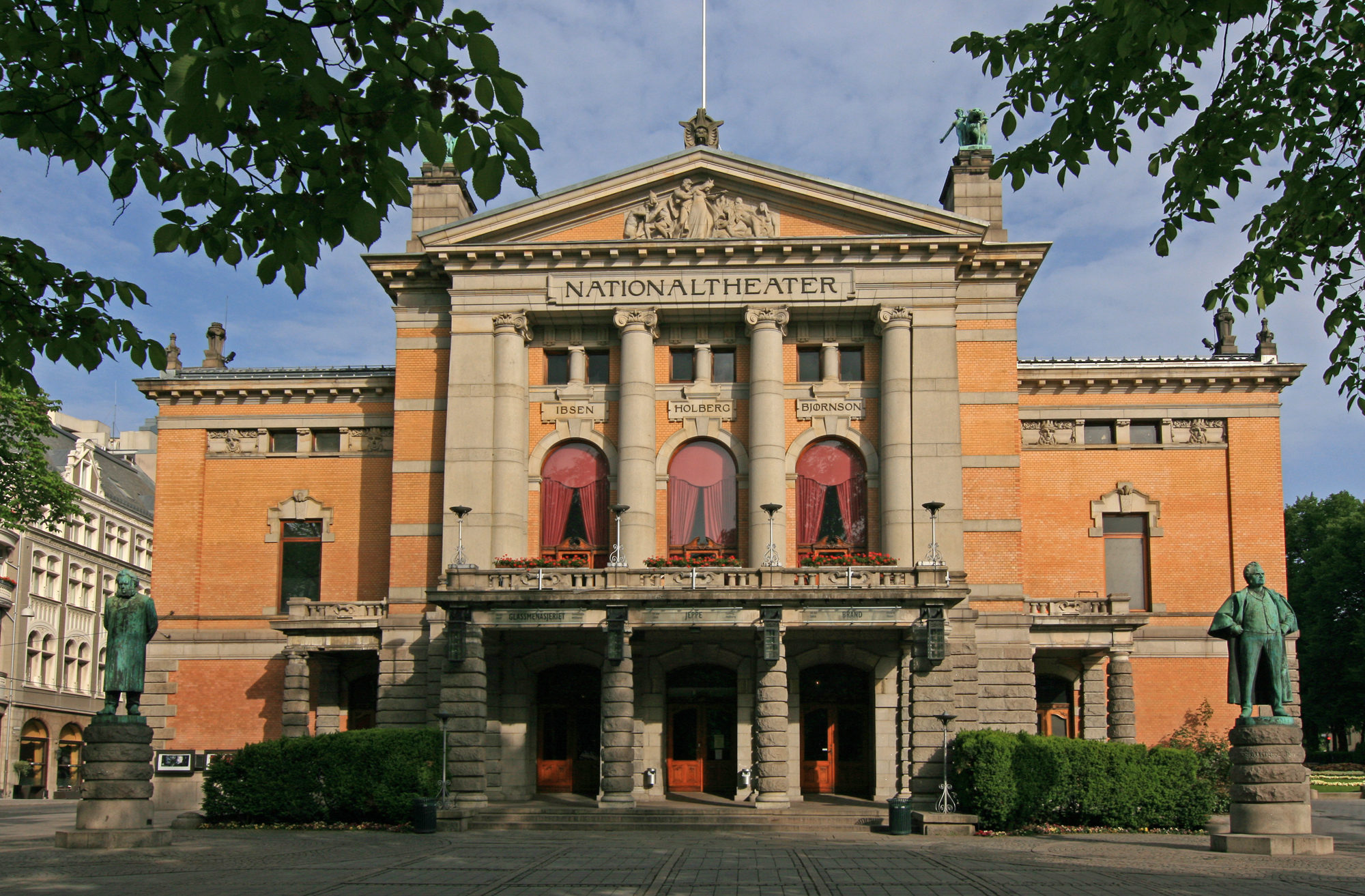
The National Theatre, Oslo.

=== Monumental buildings ===
Bull designed three of the most important new buildings in Kristiania about 1900. The National Theatre (1891-1899) is regarded as one of the most successful buildings in Norway from the historicism period. The Historical Museum (1902) was based on deceased architect Karl August Henriksen's draft from 1890. The Government Building (1904) was based on a draft by architect Stener Lenschow from 1887/1891.

=== Jubilée exhibition 1914 ===
Bull was responsible for the buildings at the 1914 Jubilee Exhibition in Kristiania. He also designed several of the exhibition buildings, including the bridge, the Machinery Hall, the Industry Hall. The buildings were demolished after the exhibition.

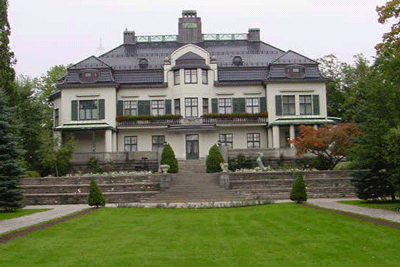
Villa Otium Norway US embassy residence

=== Design work ===
- Bull also designed furniture and other utilitarian articles. One of his works, an exclusive dining room set, is located at the Norwegian Museum of Cultural History at Bygdøy. His most widespread works were the coins designed for Norges Bank in 1907 and in 1923-1924.
- The Art Nouveau or Jugendstyle residence of the United States Ambassador to Norway, called the Villa Otium, was designed by him. (Note: The building was inspired by Russian architecture, and was built for Hans Andreas Olsen, who had encountered the style when he was the Consul General for Norway at St. Petersburg, Russia with his wife Ester, the niece of Alfred Nobel. "Ambassador's Residence in Oslo; "Villa Otium"". U.S. Department of State. Archived from the original on 15 October 2011.)

== See also ==
- Otium
