= Vincent Stoltenberg Lerche =

Norwegian painter (1837-1892)

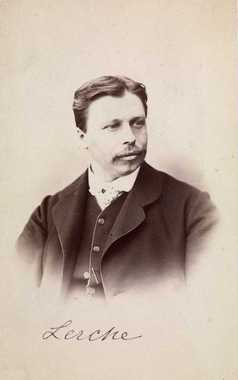
Vincent Stoltenberg Lerche (1880)

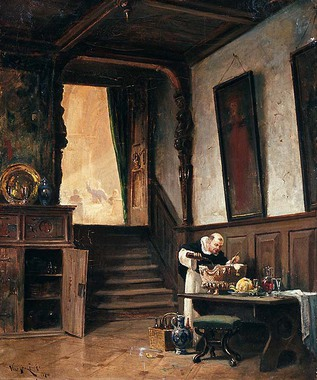
Kardinal (1870)

Vincent Stoltenberg Lerche (5 September 1837 - 28 December 1892), was a Norwegian painter, illustrator and author.

== Life ==
He was born in Tønsberg, Norway, the son of ship-owner Vincent Stoltenberg Lerche, Sr. (1809–1894) and Christine Marie Rosenvinge (1839–1926). His half-sister, Valborg Lerche, was the first female theologian in Norway.

His parents wanted him to study medicine but, in 1856, after completing his primary education and taking drawing lessons, he went to Düsseldorf, where he took lessons from Hans Gude, Benjamin Vautier and others. Initially, he created architectural paintings. After graduating, he toured the Rhineland, painting churches, then returned to Norway, where he worked at Trondheim and Roskilde. In 1864, with a state grant, he travelled through Southern Germany and Northern Italy, sketching architectural monuments.

He got married in 1866 and, in 1872, purchased a studio in Düsseldorf that formerly belonged to Adolph Tidemand. He lived there until his death from an abdominal ailment, twenty years later. His home eventually became a museum, but was destroyed during Second World War.

For many years he provided drawings for numerous German, Norwegian and Swedish magazines; notably Ny Illustrerad Tidning. In 1879, he was one of the illustrators for Norske Folke- og Huldre-Eventyr i Udvalg, a collection of folk-tales published by Peter Christen Asbjørnsen. In addition, he wrote and illustrated his own humorous tales, satires and travelogues, many of them for children, which were published in two volumes as Små Billeder for Store Börn (Small Pictures for Big Children).

He was also known as a cartoonist, and created popular pictures of churches and monasteries that featured caricatures of merry priests and monks. Later, he painted 18th century interiors with figures and did a series of works on themes from the plays of Ludvig Holberg.
