= Egil Baardseth =

Norwegian botanist and professor (1912–1991)

Egil Morris Baardseth (born 2 May 1912 in Bærum, died on 29 January 1991 in Trondheim) was a Norwegian botanist and phycologist.

== Biography ==
Baardseth was born in Bærum, just west of Oslo, to Carl Morris Baardseth (1880-1963), a marine insurance manager, and Solveig Tellefsen. His uncle was publisher Torger Baardseth.

He attended the University of Oslo, and for his doctoral work, participated in the 1937-1938 Norwegian Scientific Expedition to Tristan da Cunha in the southern Atlantic Ocean. Upon his return he successfully defended his dissertation and published The Marine Algae of Tristan da Cunha (1941), which includes an account of the 125 species of red, brown and green algae documented on the expedition. As many as 49 species were endemic to Tristan da Cunha, for which he is credited as first describing. The samples he collected are deposited at the Botanical Museum in Oslo.

In 1946 he married Olaug Sunniva Siqveland (20 January 1920 - 27 February 1998). From 1949 he worked at the newly opened Norwegian Institute of Seaweed and Seaweed Research, in Trondheim, where he developed methods for estimating seaweed populations along the Norwegian coast from small samples. In 1966-1967 he was UNESCO's representative in Cuba, initiating the exploration of algal resources, and from 1970 to 1980 he was professor of marine botany at the University of Bergen.

Baardseth retired in 1980 and moved back to Trondheim, where he died in 1991. He had no children.

== Citations ==
The standard author abbreviation Baardseth is used to indicate this person as the author when citing a botanical name.
