= Kristine Munch =

Norwegian physician (1873–1959)

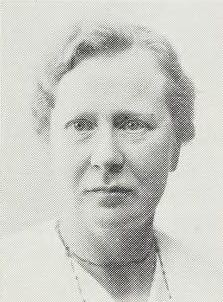
Kristine Munch in a photo from before 1933

Kristine Munch (10 July 1873 – 11 October 1959) was a Norwegian physician. She was among the first female physicians in Norway.

She was born in Horten as a daughter of priest Johan Storm Munch (1827–1908) and Kaja Michaeline Falch (1830–1898). She had seven siblings, and was a granddaughter of poet Johan Storm Munch, Sr., and a niece of poet and playwright Andreas Munch. She was a second cousin of painter Edvard Munch, and historian Peter Andreas Munch was a cousin of her father.

She took her examen artium in 1893, enrolled in medicine studies at the Royal Frederick University at a time when this was uncommon for women, and graduated with the cand.med. degree in 1900. She was a medical candidate at Kristiania Municipal Hospital from 1901 to 1902 (together with fellow pioneer Louise Isachsen). They both travelled to Edinburgh in 1902; Munch to study pediatrics and internal medicine. From 1903 the two ran their own clinic in Kristiania, first located in Møllergaten and later at St. Olavs plass. From 1908 they were also assistants at Our Lady's Hospital. In the 1920s she had connections to various medical institutions, retiring in 1936. Between 1919 and 1928 Munch conducted several study trips to the United States, Germany, France, Austria and Italy.

With their Christian attitude towards life, Munch and Isachsen worked together to limit abortus provocatus, in articles and public speeches. The two also founded three organizations for women; the Women Students' Choral Society (1895), the Women Students' Christian Association (1897) and the Medical Women's Association (1921). In these three organizations she was a board member until 1925, board member until 1912 and chairman until 1925 respectively. Munch was also a co-founder of the Medical Women's International Association in 1919, serving as vice president and corresponding secretary until 1925.

She died in October 1959 in Oslo.
