= Sverre Hagerup Bull =

Norwegian banker, composer and writer

Sverre Hagerup Bull (17 August 1892 – 12 May 1976) was a Norwegian banker, composer and writer.

He was born in Kristiania as a son of politician Edvard Hagerup Bull. He was a nephew of architect Schak Bull, and a grandnephew of painter Knud Bull, violinist Ole Bull and architect Georg Andreas Bull.

He wrote several operettes. His main textual works were the two-volume Musikk og musikere ('Music and Musicians', released in 1930 and 1932) and 1951's Musikkens verden ('The World of Music'), for which he was the editor. He sometimes used the pseudonym Finn Helle.

He was the father of composer Edvard Hagerup Bull. He resided in Norway at Jar.
