= Torger Baardseth =

Norwegian bookseller and publisher

Torger Baardseth (23 September 1875 – 21 October 1947) was a Norwegian bookseller and publisher.

== Background ==
Torger Baardseth was born at Bærum in Akershus county, Norway. His parents were Nils Baardseth (1839–1920) and Gunda Elisa Morris (1855–1926). After middle school examination in 1891, he was an apprentice at P. T.Malling bokhandel in Christiania. In 1899, he traveled to Copenhagen to work at Det nordiske Forlag, one of Scandinavia's leading publishers.

== Career ==
In January 1901 he began working at J. W. Cappelens Forlag, one of the oldest publishing houses of Norway. He was the director of Cappelens from 1904 to 1916 and 1919 to 1943. In between, Baardseth had the chance for self-employment when he took over leadership of Steenske Forlag, a small company that dated to 1829. After a half year, he offered to buy the publishing house, and he was able to, with financial help from Jørgen W. Cappelen III. Baardseth continued as chairman of Steenske. Baardseth made it a publishing company with great influence. One of the first major tasks he undertook was a complete release of all works that 19th-century Norwegian writer Henrik Wergeland had written.

Torger Baardseth was chairman of the Norwegian Booksellers Association from 1902 to 1916, Assistant (with brief interruptions) in the Norwegian Publishers Association 1922-24 and 1929–36, chairman of the Norwegian Pension Fund and Bookstores Savings Bank from 1916 and the Norwegian Booksellers Association 1936-39. In many fields, he took up the fight to improve conditions of workers, from education and scholarship schemes to salary and pension. A central issue for many years was the worker's right to establish themselves as independent bookstores.
