= Louise Isachsen =

Norwegian physician (1875–1932)

Gusta Louise Isachsen (11 December 1875 – 11 March 1932) was a Norwegian physician. She was the country's first female surgeon.

She was born in Drøbak as a daughter of ship captain Nils Høgh Isachsen (1838–1913) and Cecilie Marie Sivertsen (1839–1909). She was a sister of polar researcher Gunnar Isachsen. After attending Ragna Nielsen's School from 1891 to 1893 she took her examen artium at Gjertsen School. She enrolled in medicine studies at the Royal Frederick University, at a time when this was still highly unusual for women, and graduated with the cand.med. degree in 1900.

She was a medical candidate at Rikshospitalet and Kristiania Municipal Hospital from 1901 to 1902 (together with fellow pioneer Kristine Munch), became interested in women's diseases and studied gynecology in Edinburgh in 1902. Munch accompanied her, but studied different subjects. From 1903 Munch and Isachsen were running their own clinic in Kristiania. From 1908 to 1911 Isachsen was an assistant of Norway's first gynecologist Emil Rode, and studied gynecology abroad again in 1909, this time in Giessen and Berlin. From 1910 to 1927 she was an assistant of birth doctor Christian Kielland in Kristiania, running the clinic during his numerous stays abroad. She was also a surgeon at Our Lady's Hospital from 1912, after four years as a surgery assistant. Between 1919 and 1931 she conducted several study trips to the United States, Germany, France, Austria and Sweden.

Isachsen was a co-founder of three organizations for women: the Women Students' Choral Society (1895), the Women Students' Christian Association (1897) and the Medical Women's Association (1921). She was a board member of the convalescence institution Godthaab from 1922. She was active in the contemporary debate regarding abortus provocatus, and held numerous public speeches, lectures and courses on hygiene and related subjects.

She died in March 1932 in Oslo from breast cancer. A memorial stone was raised at her grave in 1933.
