= Peter Tidemand Malling =

Norwegian bookseller, printer and publisher (1807–1878)

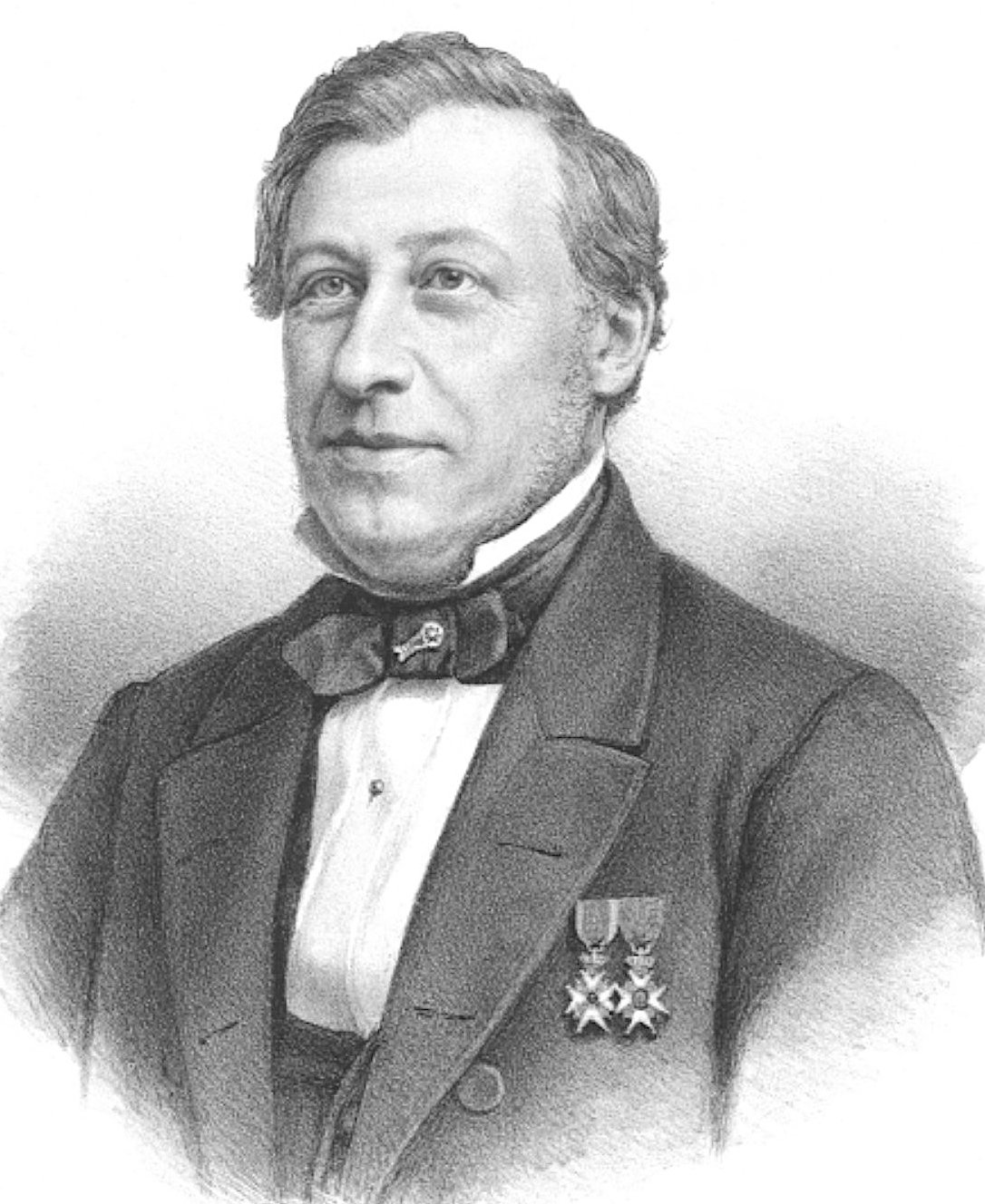
Peter Tidemand Malling

Peter Tidemand Malling (20 November 1807 – 19 April 1878) was a Norwegian bookseller, printer and publisher. Malling was a pioneer in the publishing industry around the middle of the 19th century.

== Background ==
Peter Tidemand Malling was born in Strømsø (now part of Drammen) in Buskerud County, Norway. His parents were Michael Malling (1776–1834) and Maren Elisabeth Klein (1777–1856). After schooling at Strømsø, Malling went to Drammen Latin School.

Malling apprenticed with Carl F. Rode, the first book printer in Drammen. In 1827, he traveled to Amsterdam, where his mother had family, and was employed by a larger printer. In 1829 he was employed as a factor for the printing-lithographic institution of Hans T. Winther in Christiania (now Oslo). From 1835-38, he was a factor at the publishing company of Guldberg & Dzwonkowski and led the printing of the illustrated Skilling-Magazin.

== Career ==
Starting from January 1838, he had his own company. He published practical guides, cooking and medical books and other non-profit literature. In 1840, he bought Louis Risum's printing shop and moved it to Tønsberg. While Malling ran a print shop in Tønsberg, he continued his publishing business in Christiania. Dating to January 1839, he began to publish the newspaper, Dagbladet, a journal for trade, shipping, industries and policies. Starting in 1841, he published a new newspaper, Tønsbergs Mercur. From 1842, he operated his own printing press, under the name Det Mallingske Boktrykkeri.

For a number of years, Malling also printed for Norges Bank's banknote. In the 1860s he published both poetry collection Symra and Norwegian grammar for Ivar Aasen. He had become acquainted with Henrik Wergeland and published several of his writings. The first issue of Tønsbergs Mercur was opened with a poem by Wergeland, and the writer was the magazine's Christiania correspondent.

In 1851, Malling helped found the Norwegian Booksellers Association and later served as chair from 1870 to 1878. During 1873, the printing business was sold, but continued under the name Det Mallingske Bogtrykkeri.

== Other sources ==
- Andersen, O. S. Bilder av bokhandelens historie gjennom hundre år (1950)
- Jacobsen, G. Norske boktrykkere og trykkerier gjennom fire århundrer 1640–1940 (1983)
