= Schak Bull =

Norwegian architect (1858–1956)

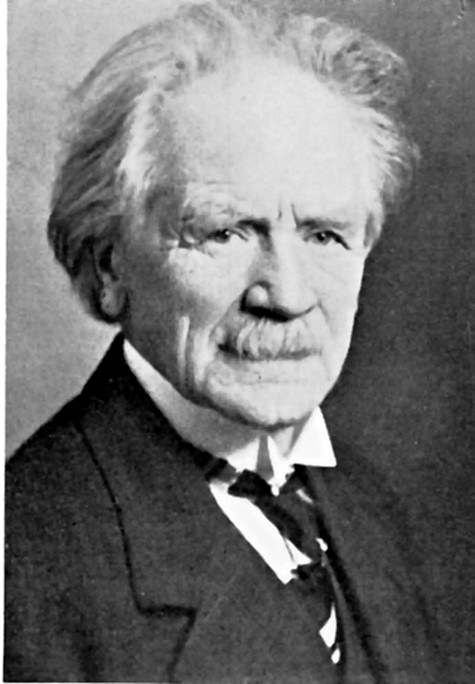
Schak Bull

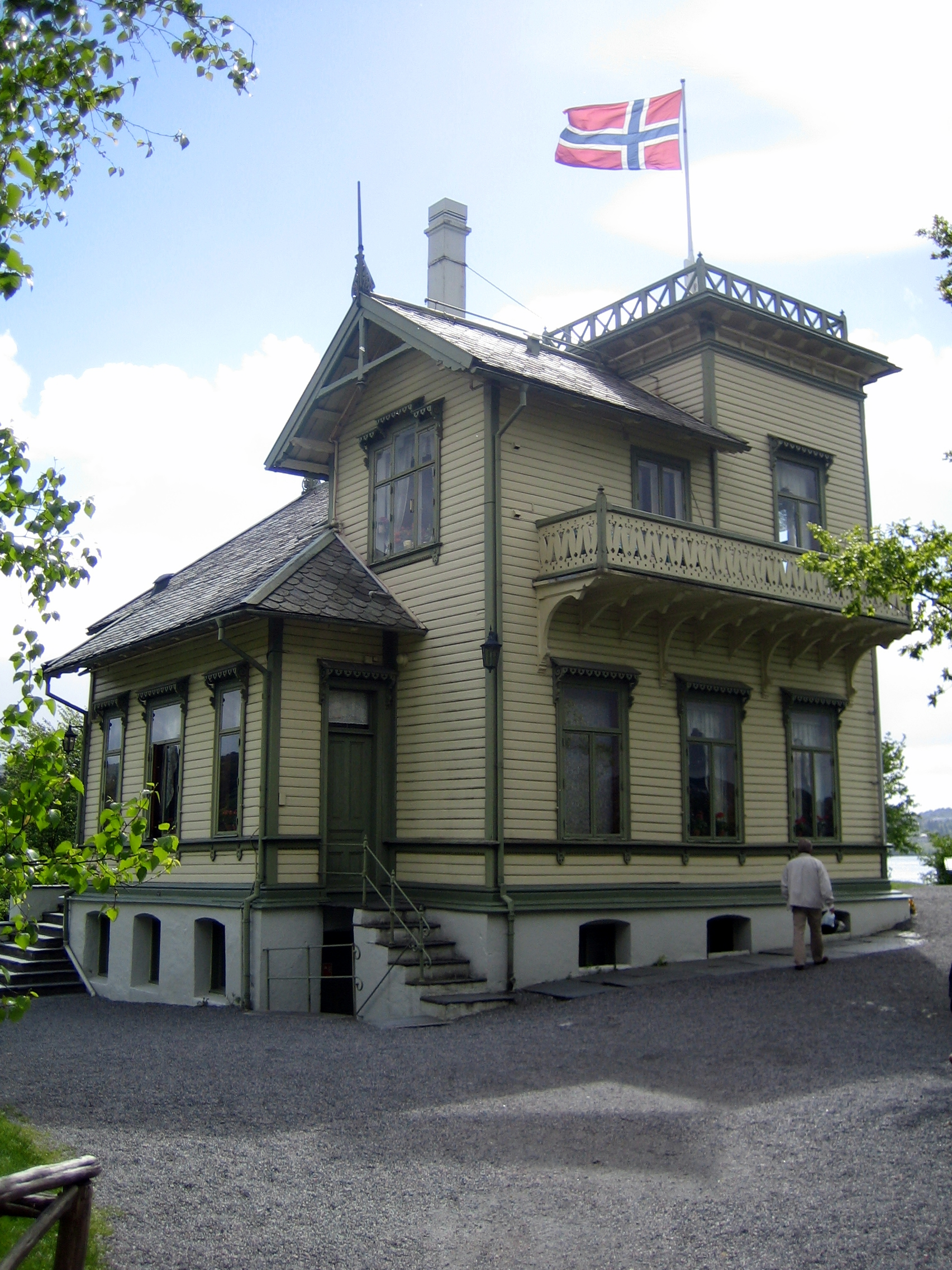
Troldhaugen.

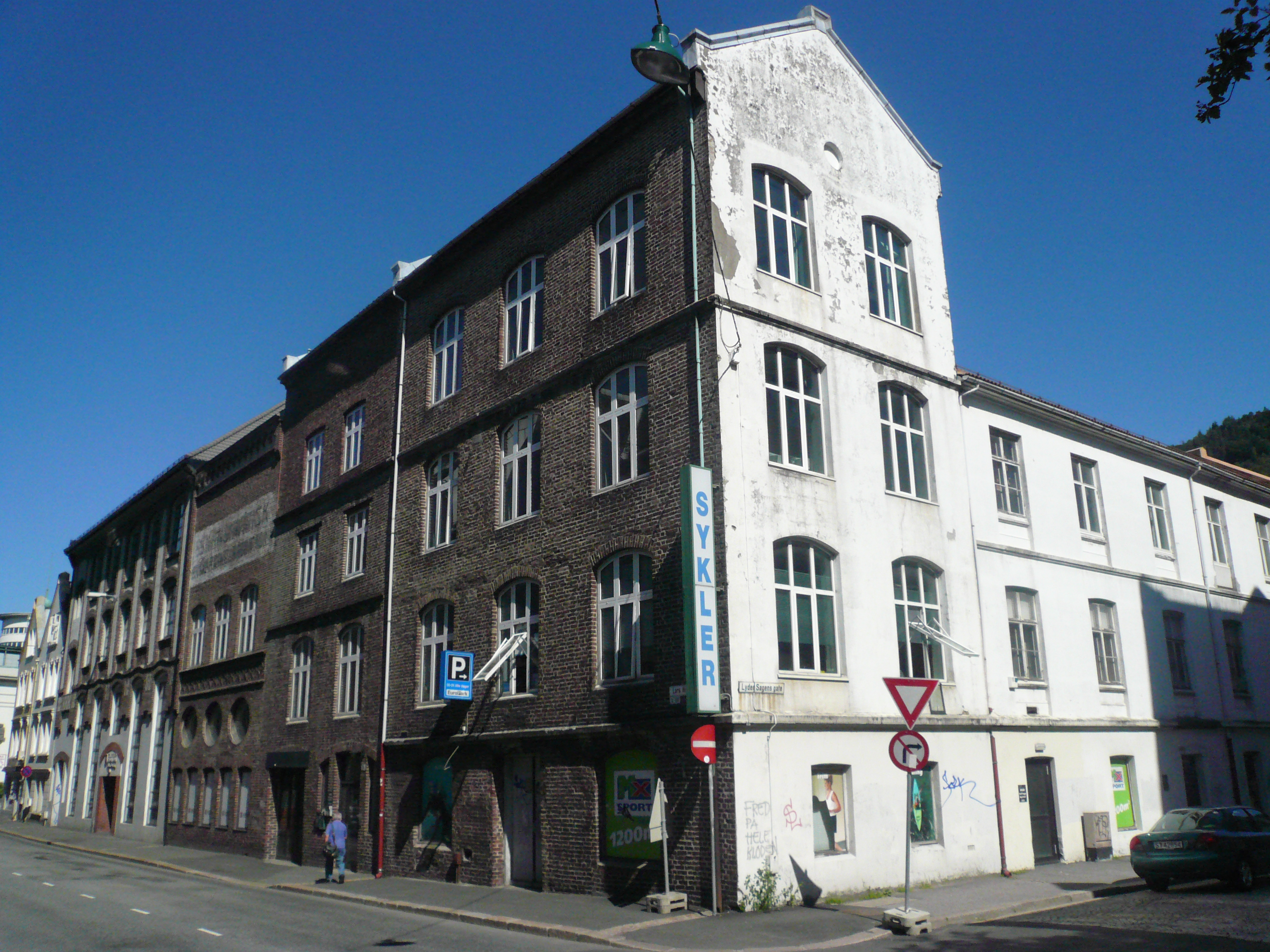
Tangens Gardinvæveri.

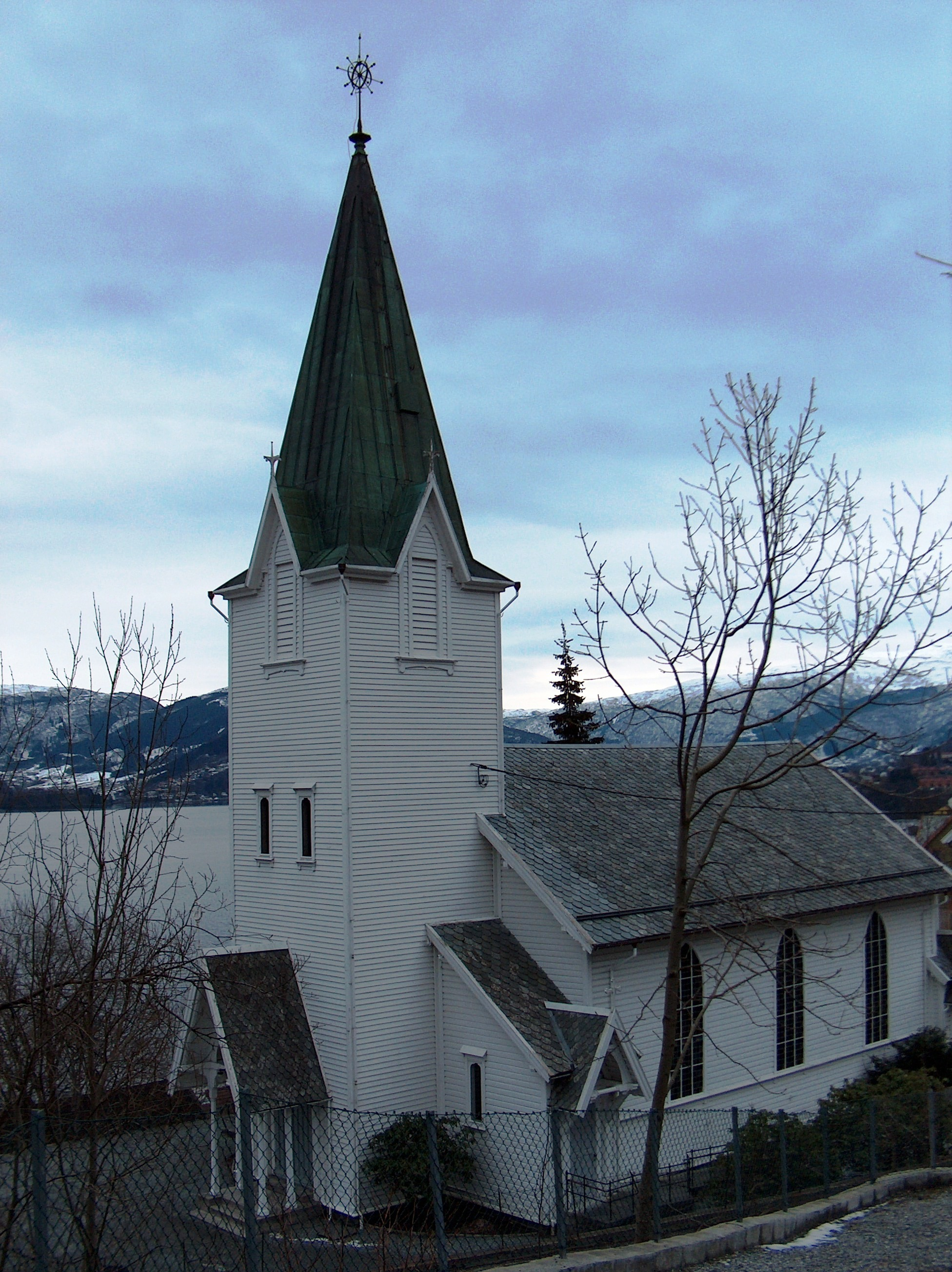
Ytre Arna Church in Ytre Arna.

Schak August Steenberg Bull (10 May 1858 – 25 January 1956) was a Norwegian architect.

== Personal life ==
He was born in Aarstad Municipality as the son of Colonel Jens Munthe Bull (1815-1905) and his wife Johanne Margrethe Hagerup (1817-1888). His brother Edvard Hagerup Bull was a judge and politician, and his maternal grandfather was politician Edvard Hagerup. Also, he was a nephew of composer Ole Bull and architect Georg Andreas Bull, an uncle of composer Sverre Hagerup Bull and a cousin of architect Henrik Bull and composer Edvard Grieg.

In April 1884 he married Ivarna Berle.

== Career ==
Schak Bull graduated from the Eidgenössische Technische Hochschule Zürich or ETH Zürich (Swiss Federal Institute of Technology in Zurich) in 1879, after which he returned to Bergen, Norway to work as an architect. He was responsible for several important buildings, including Troldhaugen, the residence of his cousin Edvard Grieg, several churches and commercial buildings. He adhered mainly to the architectural style historicism before 1900, and Jugendstil after 1900. From 1914 he formed a partnership with his son Jens Munthe Bull.

Bull was also a member of the municipal council of Bergen Municipality.

In total he was the architect of 186 buildings in Bergen, as well as several in other parts of the country, although many of these have been lost in fires. He died in 1956 in Bergen, at the age of 98 years.
