= Johan Storm Munch =

Norwegian bishop

Right Reverend Johan Storm Munch
- Bishop
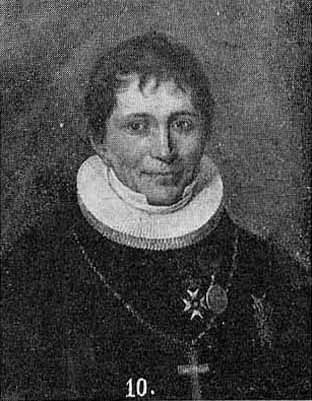
- Church: Church of Norway
- Diocese: Christianssand
- Appointed: 1823
- In office: 1823–1832
- Predecessor: Christian Sørenssen
- Successor: Mathias Sigwardt

Personal details
- Born: 31 August 1778
- Died: 26 January 1832 (aged 53)
- Denomination: Christian
- Parents: Peter Munch and Christine Sophie Storm
- Spouse: Else Petronelle Hofgaard
- Children: Andreas Munch and Johan Storm Munch
- Occupation: Priest

Johan Storm Munch (31 August 1778 – 26 January 1832) was a bishop in the Church of Norway. He was also known as a poet, playwright, and magazine editor.

Munch was born at Vaage in Christians amt (county), Norway. He was the son of parish priest Peter Munch (1740–1802) and Christine Sophie Storm (1746–1825). He was educated for the ministry principally by his father. From 1800 to 1805, he was a private tutor for members of the Løvenskiold noble family at Løvenborg in Zealand in Denmark. In 1805, he was called to be an assistant pastor in Skjeberg in Østfold county, Norway. In 1810, he took a year-long teaching position at Prinds Christian Augusts Minde, a hospital and asylum in Christiania. He then became a private tutor in Christiania. In 1813, he was called to be the pastor in Sande in Vestfold. In 1817 he received the call to work as vicar of the parish of Aker as well as the palace priest for Akershus Fortress. In 1823, he was appointed to be the Bishop of the Diocese of Christianssand where he was based at the Christianssand Cathedral. He held this position until his death in 1832.

He published the poetry collection Fjeldblomster in 1813, edited the magazine Saga from 1816 to 1820, and published the play Præsten i Hallingdal in 1825.

== Personal life ==
In 1810, he married Else Petronelle Hofgaard (1790–1879). They were the parents of Norwegian poet and novelist, Andreas Munch (1811–1884) as well as Norwegian Lutheran minister, Johan Storm Munch (1827–1908).

Religious titles
Preceded by Christian Sørenssen	Bishop of Christianssand; 1823–1832	Succeeded by Mathias Sigwardt
