= Georg Andreas Bull =

Norwegian architect (1829–1917)

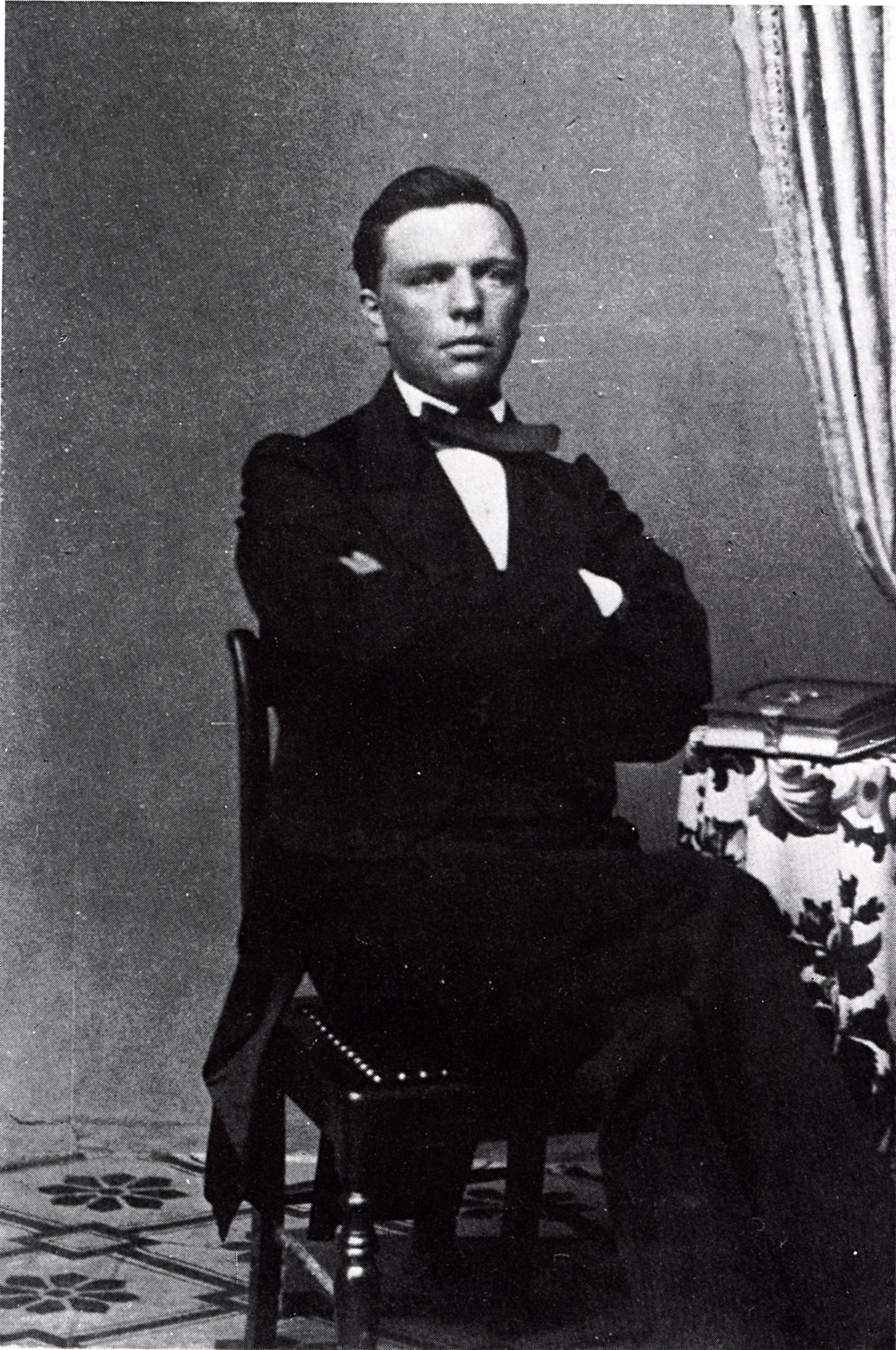
- Born: 26 March 1829; Bergen, Norway
- Died: 1 February 1917 (aged 87)
- Occupation: Architect
- Relatives: Ole Bull (brother)

Georg Andreas Bull (26 March 1829 – 1 February 1917) was a Norwegian architect and chief building inspector in Christiania (now Oslo) for forty years. He was among the major architects in the country, and performed surveying studies and archeological research.

== Background ==
Bull was born in Bergen, Norway as the youngest of 10 siblings. He was a son of pharmacist Johan Storm Bull (1787–1838) and his wife Anna Dorothea Borse Geelmuyden (1789–1875). He was a brother of violinist Ole Bull and painter Knud Bull, an uncle of Edvard Hagerup Bull and Schak Bull, a granduncle of Sverre Hagerup Bull and a second cousin of Johan Randulf Bull and Anders Sandøe Ørsted Bull.

Bull received drawing lessons in Bergen by the German born architect and painter Franz Wilhelm Schiertz (1813–1887) from 1843 to 1845. He then studied machine engineering at the Polytechnische Schule in Hannover from 1846 to 1850, and continued his studies in England. After his engineering studies he made archeological studies of Haakon's Hall in Bergen and other buildings dating from the Middle Ages, including twenty stave churches. He studied architecture at the Berliner Bauakademie from 1855 to 1856.

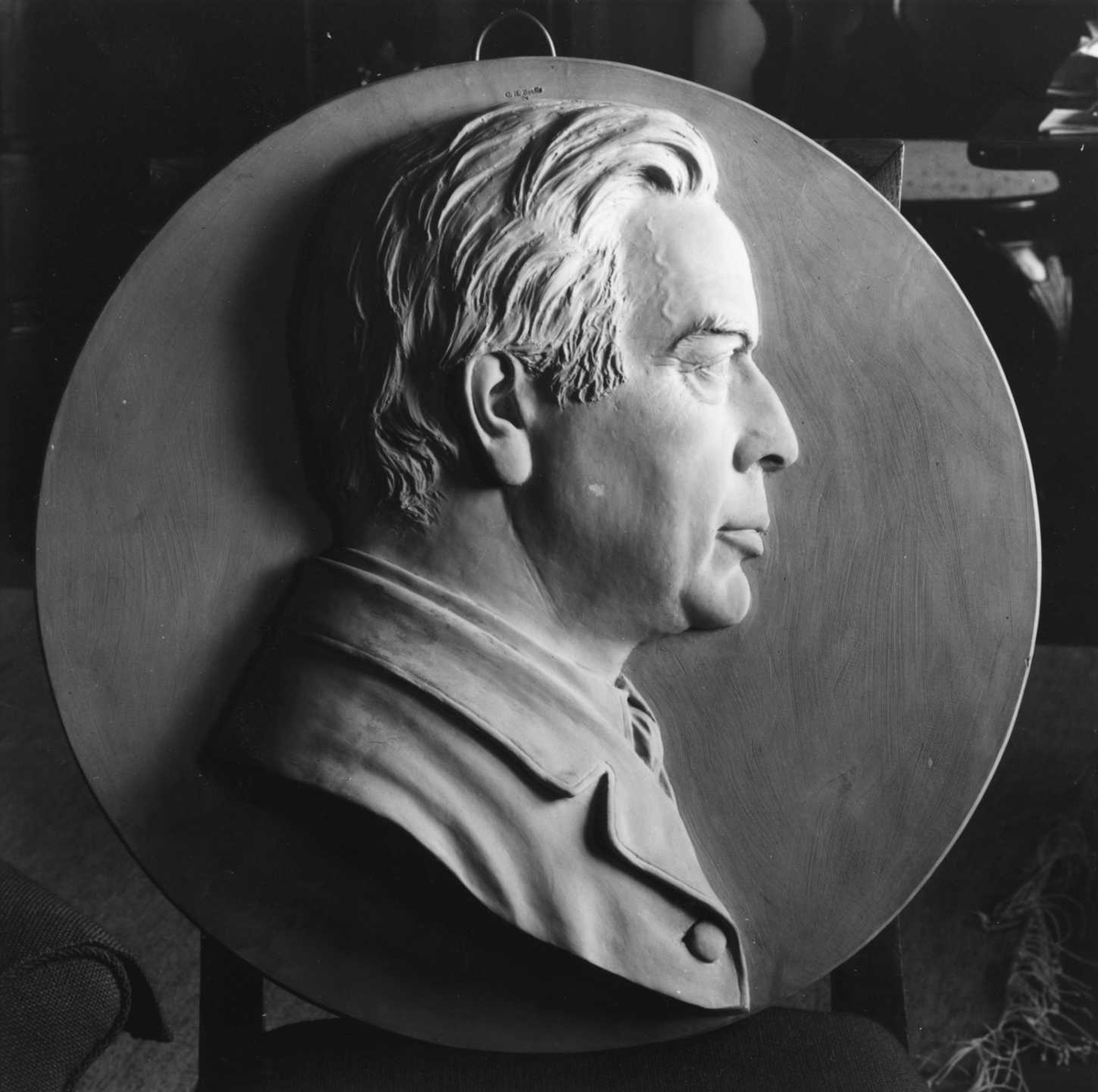
Georg Andreas Bull from the Oslo Museum.

== Career ==
He started working as an architect in Kristiania during 1857, where his first significant work was Christiania Dampkjøkken. After a major fire in Kristiania in 1858 he started planning the villa area Homansbyen, where he also designed many of the buildings, during the period from 1858 to 1866. He was architect for the state railways (Statsbanene) from 1863 to 1872.

Bull's designs ranged from churches, villas and train stations to interiors and storehouses. Among his works are the two train stations in Oslo; Oslo Vestbanestasjon and Østbanen, and altogether about sixty train stations throughout the country. He designed railway stations of the Krøder Line, including the Krøderen Station (1872) and for the Kongsvinger Line at Åbogen (1865), Matrand (1865) and Magnor (1865).

For his brother Ole Bull, he designed a new farmhouse in the summer resort at Valestrandfossen in Osterøy (1865) and probably also his newer oriental-styled Villa Lysøen on the island of Lysøya in Os Municipality, outside Bergen ca. 1872.

Bull was a board member of the Royal Danish Academy of Art 1869–84 and the National Gallery of 1869. He was a co-founder of the Norwegian Engineering and Architectural Association in 1874. Bull was a board member of the Society for the Preservation of Ancient Norwegian Monuments from 1853 to 1864 and of Christiania Theatre from 1866. He was chairman for Selskabet for Christiania Byes Vel from 1904 to 1908.

He was decorated Knight, First Class of the Royal Norwegian Order of St. Olav in 1875 and was decorated Knight of the Order of the Dannebrog.

== Personal life ==
He was married to Emilie Constance Hjelm (1832–1926) with whom he had nine children. They were the parents of architect Henrik Bull. He died in the neighborhood of Bestum in the district of Ullern in Oslo during 1917.

== Selected works ==
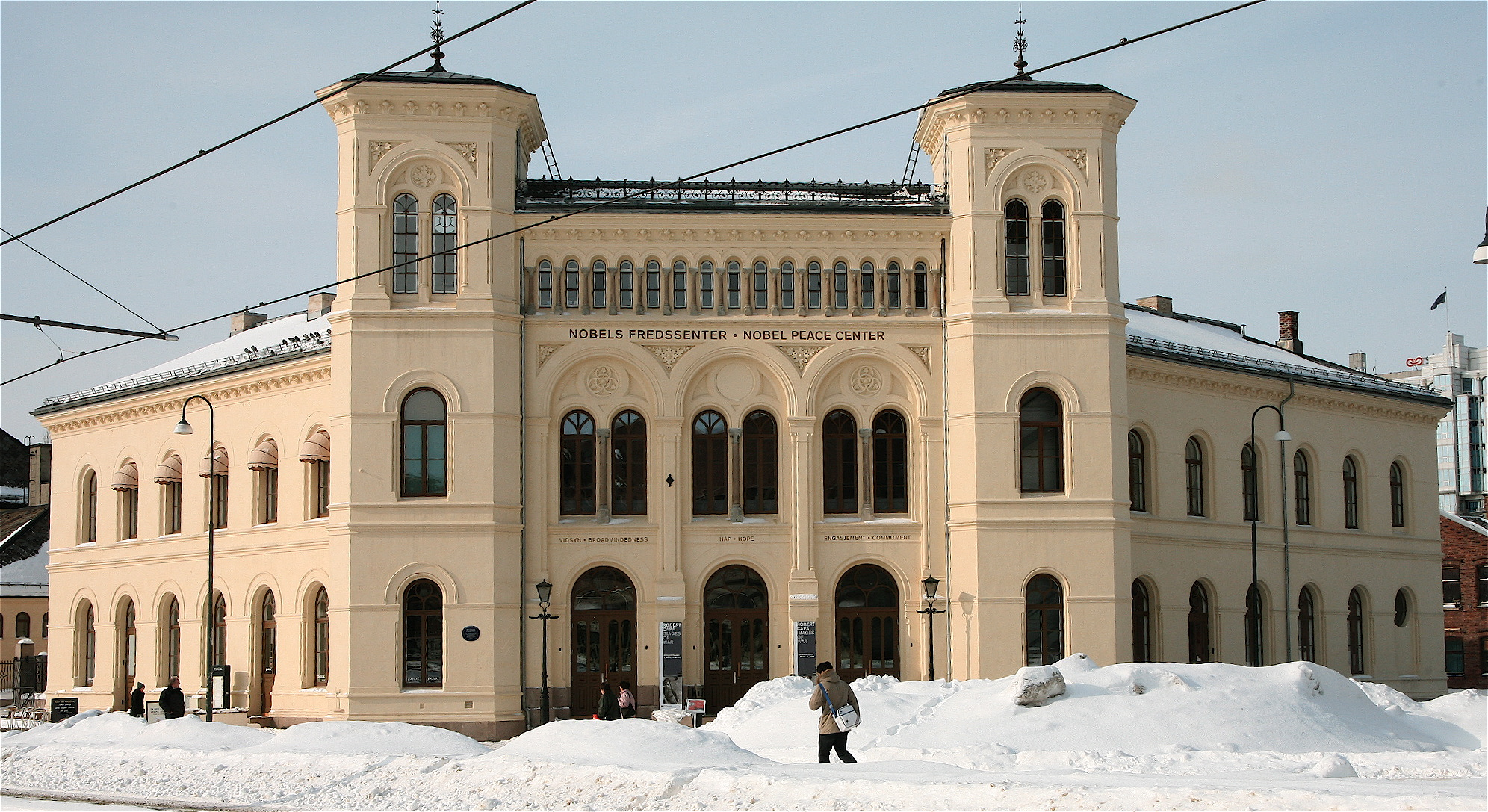
Oslo West Station

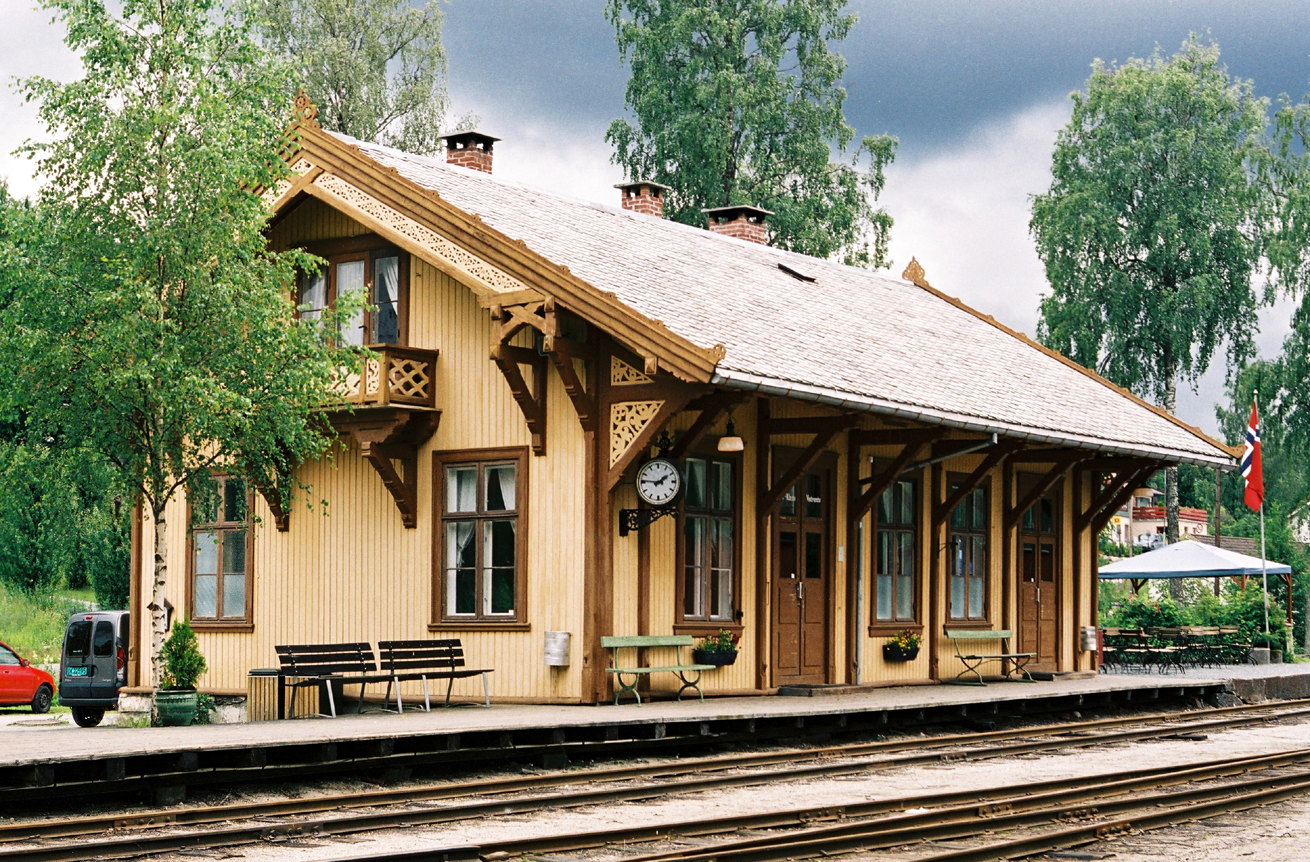
Krøderen Station

- Høle Church (Høle kyrkje) - 1858
- Vanylven Church (Vanylven kyrkje) - 1864
- Kragerø Church (Kragerø kirke) - 1870
- Oslo West Station (Vestbanestasjonen) – 1872
- Koppang Station (Gamle Koppang stasjon)- 1875
- Oslo Central Station (Østbanestasjonen) - 1878
- St. James Church (Jakob kirke) - 1880
