= Edvard Hagerup Bull =

Norwegian politician (1855–1938)

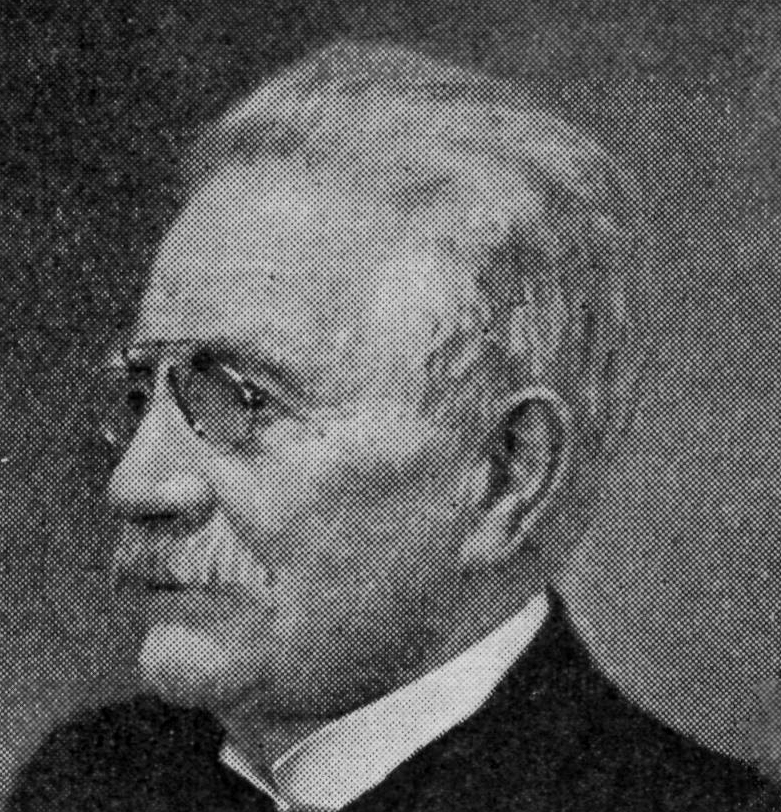

Minister of Finance
- In office 21 June 1920 – 22 June 1921
- Prime Minister: Otto B. Halvorsen
- Preceded by: Anton Omholt
- Succeeded by: Otto Blehr
- In office 27 November 1905 – 7 November 1906
- Prime Minister: Christian Michelsen
- Preceded by: Christian Michelsen
- Succeeded by: Abraham Berge
- In office 6 June 1889 – 8 July 1889; Acting
- Prime Minister: Johan Sverdrup
- Preceded by: Peter Olrog Schjøtt
- Succeeded by: Olaj Johan Olsen

Minister of Justice
- In office 7 June 1905 – 27 November 1905
- Prime Minister: Christian Michelsen
- Preceded by: Christian Michelsen
- Succeeded by: Harald Bothner

Member of the Council of State Division
- In office 11 March 1905 – 7 June 1905 Serving with Harald Bothner
- Prime Minister: Christian Michelsen
- Preceded by: Birger Kildal; Jacob Schøning
- Succeeded by: Position abolished

Personal details
- Born: 23 January 1855 Bergen, Hordaland, United Kingdoms of Sweden and Norway
- Died: 25 March 1938 (aged 83) Bærum, Akershus, Norway
- Party: Conservative
- Spouse: Theodora Kraft (m. 1880)
- Children: Sverre; Agnes

Edvard Hagerup Bull (23 January 1855 – 25 March 1938) was a Norwegian jurist and assessor of the Supreme Court of Norway. He was a member of the Norwegian Parliament and government official with the Conservative Party of Norway.

== Background ==
Edvard Hagerup Bull was born in Bergen as the son of Colonel Jens Munthe Bull (1815–1905) and his wife Johanne Margrethe Hagerup (1817–1888). His brother Schak Bull (1858 – 1956) was an architect, and his maternal grandfather was politician Edvard Hagerup. He was also a nephew of composer Ole Bull and architect Georg Andreas Bull, and cousin of composer Edvard Grieg. He had his secondary education at Bergen Cathedral School during 1872, enrolled as a student and graduated with the degree cand.jur. in 1876. He was hired as an attorney for the law company of Emil Stang, and worked there from 1877 to 1879.

== Career ==
During July 1879 he was hired by the Ministry of the Interior, transferring to the Ministry of Finance the next year. Here, he was promoted to assistant secretary in 1882 and deputy under-secretary of State in 1888. He had been acting deputy under-secretary since 1887. He had this job until 1893, except for the period between 6 June 1889 and 7 July 1889, when he was acting Minister of Finance.

During October 1893 he became acting assessor of the Supreme Court. In January 1895 this position was made permanent. He had this job until January 1918, except for a period between 1905 and February 1907.

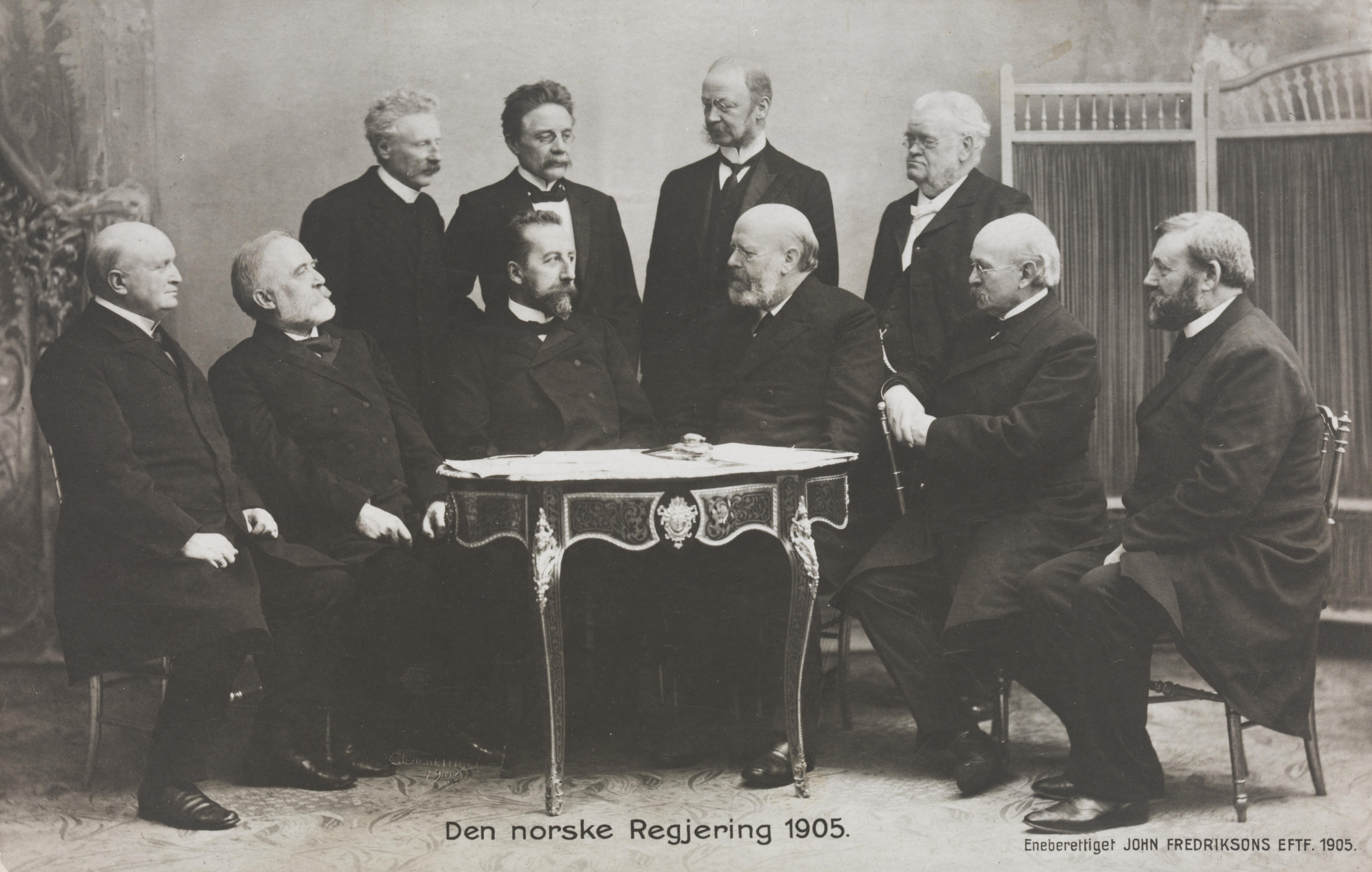
The cabinet Michelsen. In the front, left to right: Olssøn, Arctander, Michelsen, Løvland, G. Knudsen, Vinje. Behind, left to right: Bothner, Bull, Lehmkuhl, Chr. Knudsen.

During March 1905, when the Michelsen's Cabinet assumed office, Bull had been appointed a member of the Council of State Division in Stockholm. He left on 6 June as the Union between Sweden and Norway was dissolved unilaterally by Norway. Instead, Bull was brought home to the newly independent state of Norway to become Minister of Justice and the Police. He had this job until 26 November the same year, when he was appointed Minister of Finance and Customs. He quit after slightly less than a year, on 6 November 1906. He was preceded by Christian Michelsen and succeeded by Abraham Berge, both of whom were Prime Ministers at one point.

Having quit the Supreme Court during 1918, he later resumed politics to serve as Minister of Finance and Customs in the first cabinet Bahr Halvorsen. This cabinet existed exactly for one year, from 21 June 1920 to 21 June 1921. Again, he was preceded and succeeded by two persons who also served as Prime Ministers, Gunnar Knudsen and Otto Blehr respectively.

Additionally, Bull was elected to the Norwegian Parliament for four terms. In 1903 he was elected to serve the term 1904–1906 as the fifth representative of Akershus Amt. He was not re-elected in 1906, but he returned in 1910 for the constituency of Aker. He was then re-elected on two consecutive occasions. For the last three terms he was the manager of the Conservative Party parliamentary group.

Bull was a member of several boards and committees, both public and private. He was chairman of the board of Spareskillingsbanken from 1899 to 1928, vice board chairman of Norges Bank from 1900 to 1912 and board member of the publishing house Gyldendal Norsk Forlag from 1922. Additionally, was the first chairman of the Nordic cooperation organization Foreningen Norden from 1919 to 1926.

== Personal life ==
During June 1880 he married Theodora Kraft (1855–1924). Both their son Sverre Hagerup Bull and their grandson Edvard Hagerup Bull became composers. Their daughter Johanne Margrethe Hagerup Bull was married to Norwegian diplomat Niels Christian Ditleff. He resided in the neighborhood of Jar in Bærum in his later life.

Political offices
Preceded by Peter Olrog Schjøtt	Minister of Finance and Customs (acting); June 1889 – July 1889	Succeeded by Olaj Olsen
Preceded by Christian Michelsen	Minister of Justice and the Police; June 1905 – November 1905	Succeeded by Harald Bothner
Preceded by Christian Michelsen	Minister of Finance and Customs; November 1905–1906	Succeeded by Abraham Berge
Preceded by Gunnar Knudsen	Minister of Finance and Customs; 1920–1921	Succeeded by Otto Blehr
Cultural offices
Preceded by position created	Chairman of Foreningen Norden in Norway; 1919–1926	Succeeded by Jens Michael Lund
