= Andreas Munch =

Norwegian poet, novelist, playwright and newspaper editor

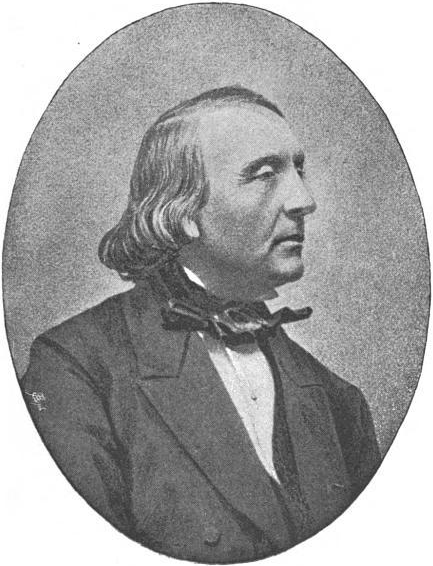
Portrait of Munch

Andreas Munch (19 October 1811 – 27 June 1884) was a Norwegian poet, novelist, playwright and newspaper editor. He was the first person to be granted a poet's pension by the Parliament of Norway.

== Personal life ==
Munch was born in Christiania, as son of poet, priest and later Lutheran Bishop Johan Storm Munch and his wife Else Petronelle Hofgaard. He was married to Charlotte Amalie Juul from 1844 until her death in 1850. One of his sons also died in 1850, and a second son died a few years later. In 1865 he married Danish citizen Anna Marie Amalie Raben. He died in Vedbæk in Denmark in 1884.

== Career ==
Munch made his literary debut in 1836 with the poetry collection Ephemerer (Ephemera). His first play was Kong Sverres Ungdom from 1837, written for the opening of Christiania Theatre´s new building. In 1840 he published the one-act play Donna Clara, set in Spain. He edited the newspaper Den Constitutionelle from 1841 to 1846. His story Den Ensomme. En Sjælehistorie was first printed in Den Constitutionelle in 1846. From 1846 to 1848 he made an educational European tour together with his family, and visited France, Italy, Switzerland and Germany. He published the poetry collection ¨Digte, gamle og nye in 1848, and Nye Digte in 1850. His poetry collection Sorg og Trøst from 1852 was written after the death of his wife and son. In 1866 Edvard Grieg composed music to the poem "Vuggesang" from this collection, published as Opus 9 together with three other songs with text by Munch. In "Vuggesang" the father sings for his newborn son after the mother's death. In the 1850s he wrote three historic plays in verse, Salomon de Caus (1854), En Aften paa Giske (1855), and Lord William Russell (1857).

Munch was granted a poet's pension by the Parliament of Norway from 1860, the first as such in Norway, and was titled professor from 1866.

He was decorated Commander, First Class of the Order of St. Olav for literary merits in 1880, and was also a Commander of the Danish Order of the Dannebrog, and a Knight of the Swedish Order of the Polar Star.
