= Hagerup's Second Cabinet =

Government of Norway from 1903 to 1905

- Cabinet of Norway

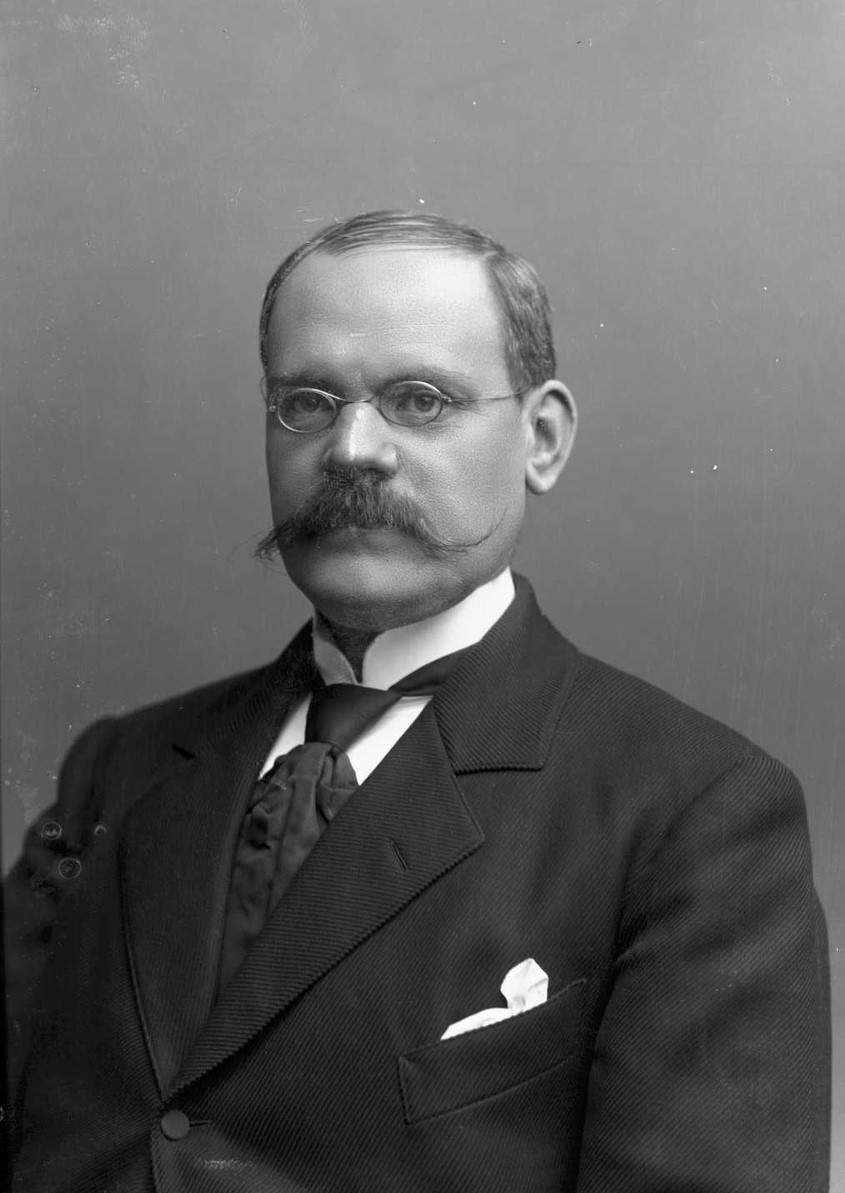
- Prime Minister Francis Hagerup.
- Date formed: 22 October 1903
- Date dissolved: 11 March 1905

People and organisations
- Head of state: Oscar II of Sweden
- Head of government: Francis Hagerup
- No. of ministers: 11
- Member party: Conservative Party; Coalition Party; Liberal Party
- Status in legislature: Coalition Majority government

History
- Election: 1903
- Legislature term: 1903–1905
- Predecessor: Blehr's First Cabinet
- Successor: Michelsen's Cabinet

The Hagerup's Second Cabinet governed Norway between 22 October 1903 and 11 March 1905. It fell as the cabinet ministers collectively resigned on 28 February and 1 March 1905, as part of the build-up for the dissolution of the union between Norway and Sweden in 1905. Christian Michelsen withdrew his application, and could form the cabinet Michelsen. It had the following composition:

== Cabinet members ==
Cabinet
Portfolio	Minister	Took office	Left office	Party
Prime Minister; Minister of Justice	Francis Hagerup	22 October 1903	11 March 1905	Conservative
Prime Minister in Stockholm	Sigurd Ibsen	22 October 1903	11 March 1905	Liberal
Minister of Finance and Customs	Birger Kildal	22 October 1903	1 September 1904	Liberal
Minister of Finance and Customs	Christian Michelsen	1 September 1904	11 March 1905	Coalition
Minister of Auditing	Birger Kildal	22 October 1903	1 September 1904	Liberal
Minister of Auditing	Paul Benjamin Vogt	1 September 1904	11 March 1905	Liberal
Minister of Defence	Oscar Strugstad	22 October 1903	11 March 1905	Coalition
Minister of Agriculture	Christian P. Mathiesen	22 October 1903	26 September 1904	Conservative
Minister of Agriculture	Johan E. Mellbye	26 September 1904	11 March 1905	Conservative
Minister of Education and Church Affairs	Hans Nilsen Hauge	22 October 1903	11 March 1905	Conservative
Minister of Trade	Jacob Schøning	22 October 1903	1 September 1904	Liberal
Minister of Trade	Paul Benjamin Vogt	1 September 1904	11 March 1905	Conservative
Minister of Labour	Albert Hansen	22 October 1903	11 March 1905	Conservative
Members of the Council of State Division in Stockholm	Christian Michelsen	22 October 1903	1 September 1904	Coalition
Members of the Council of State Division in Stockholm	Paul Benjamin Vogt	22 October 1903	1 September 1904	Conservative
Members of the Council of State Division in Stockholm	Birger Kildal	1 September 1904	11 March 1905	Liberal
Members of the Council of State Division in Stockholm	Jacob Schøning	1 September 1904	11 March 1905	Liberal

== State Secretary ==
Not to be confused with the modern title State Secretary. The old title State Secretary, used between 1814 and 1925, is now known as Secretary to the Government (Regjeringsråd).

- Halfdan Lehmann
