= Michelsen's Cabinet =

Government of Norway from 1905 to 1907

- Cabinet of Norway

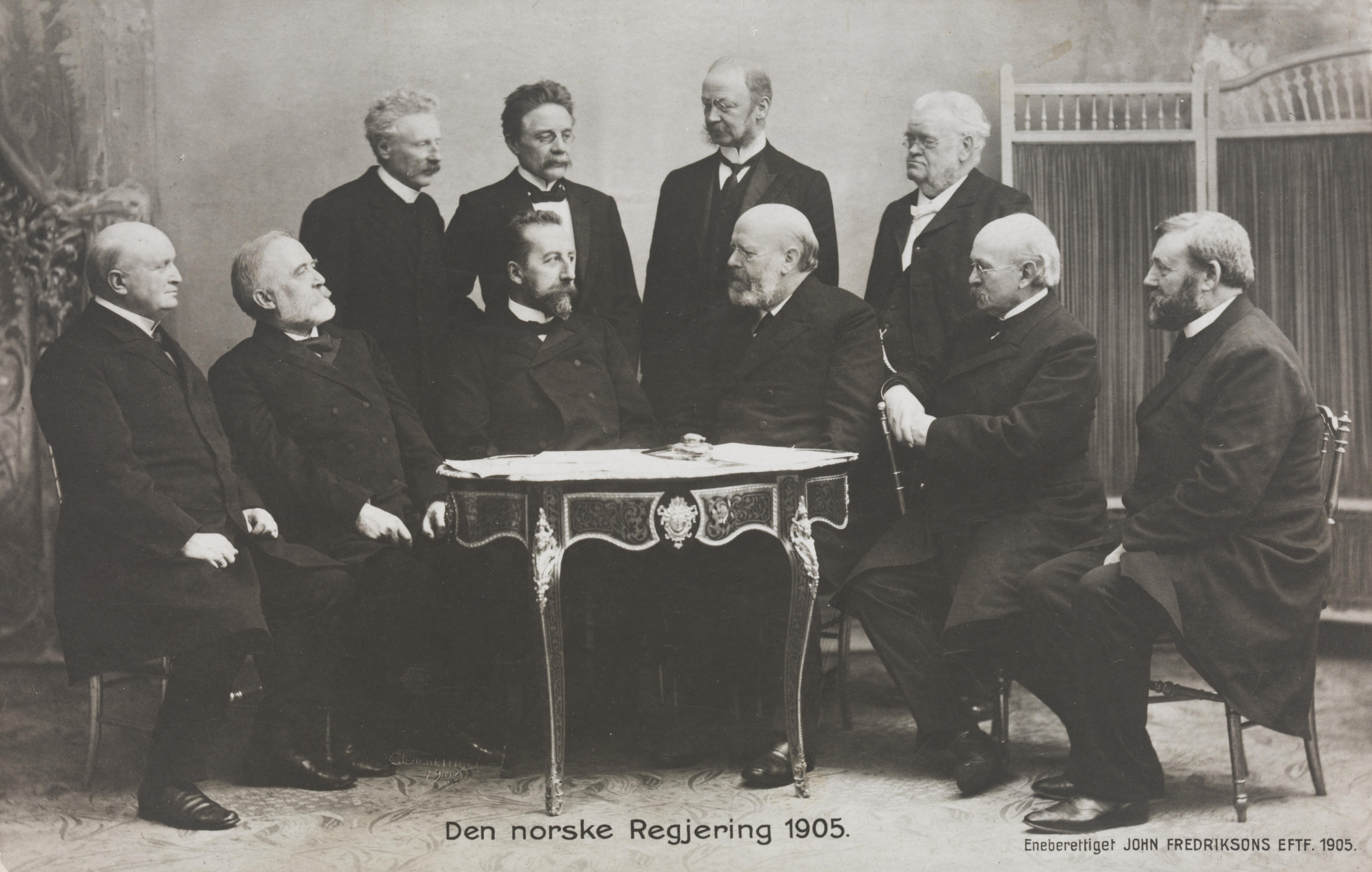
- The cabinet in 1905. In the front, left to right: Olssøn, Arctander, Michelsen, Løvland, G. Knudsen, Vinje. Behind, left to right: Bothner, Hagerup Bull, Lehmkuhl, Chr. Knudsen.
- Date formed: 11 March 1905
- Date dissolved: 23 October 1907

People and organisations
- Head of state: Haakon VII of Norway
- Head of government: Christian Michelsen
- No. of ministers: 9
- Member party: Coalition Party; Conservative Party; Liberal Party; Moderate Liberal Party
- Status in legislature: Grand coalition

History
- Election: 1906
- Legislature term: 1906–1907
- Predecessor: Hagerup's Second Cabinet
- Successor: Løvland's Cabinet

The Michelsen's Cabinet was a Norwegian cabinet, formed by a coalition of the Liberal Party, the Conservative Party, the Moderate Liberal Party and the Coalition Party. It governed Norway between 11 March 1905 and 23 October 1907. It entered office as part of the build-up for the dissolution of the union between Norway and Sweden in 1905. It was a grand coalition of liberals and conservatives set up to handle the transition to full independence in a context of national unity. It had the following composition:

== Cabinet members ==
Cabinet
Portfolio	Minister	Took office	Left office	Party
Prime Minister	Christian Michelsen	11 March 1905 (Note: Sofus Arctander was acting Prime Minister from 31 August to 23 September 1905.)	23 October 1907	Coalition
Prime Minister in Stockholm	Jørgen Løvland	11 March 1905	7 June 1905	Liberal
Minister of Foreign Affairs	Jørgen Løvland	7 June 1905	23 October 1907	Liberal
Minister of Justice and the Police	Christian Michelsen	11 March 1905	7 June 1905	Coalition
Minister of Justice and the Police	Edvard Hagerup Bull	7 June 1905	27 November 1905	Conservative
Minister of Justice and the Police	Harald Bothner	27 November 1905	23 October 1907	Liberal
Minister of Finance and Customs	Gunnar Knudsen	11 March 1905	31 October 1905	Liberal
Minister of Finance and Customs	Christian Michelsen	31 October 1905	27 November 1905	Coalition
Minister of Finance and Customs	Edvard Hagerup Bull	27 November 1905	7 November 1906	Conservative
Minister of Finance and Customs	Abraham Berge	7 November 1906	23 October 1907	Liberal
Minister of Auditing	Gunnar Knudsen	11 March 1905	7 June 1905	Liberal
Minister of Auditing	Harald Bothner	7 June 1905	27 November 1905	Liberal
Minister of Auditing	Christian Michelsen	27 November 1905	23 October 1907	Coalition
Minister of Defence	Wilhelm Olssøn	11 March 1905	25 May 1907	Conservative
Minister of Defence	Christian Michelsen (acting)	25 May 1907	23 October 1907	Coalition
Minister of Agriculture	Aasmund Halvorsen Vinje	11 March 1905	6 November 1906	Moderate Liberal
Minister of Agriculture	Sven Aarrestad	6 November 1906	23 October 1907	Liberal
Minister of Education and Church Affairs	Christopher Knudsen	11 March 1905	27 January 1906	Conservative
Minister of Education and Church Affairs	Otto Jensen	27 January 1906	23 October 1907	Independent
Minister of Trade	Sofus Arctander	11 March 1905	23 October 1907	Liberal
Minister of Labour	Kristofer Lehmkuhl	11 March 1905	28 September 1907	Conservative
Minister of Labour	Jørgen Brunchorst	28 September 1907	23 October 1907	Independent
Member of the Council of State Division in Stockholm	Edvard Hagerup Bull	11 March 1905	7 June 1905	Conservative
Member of the Council of State Division in Stockholm	Harald Bothner	11 March 1905	7 June 1905	Liberal

== Other ==
The State Secretary title is not to be confused with the modern title State Secretary. The old title State Secretary, used between 1814 and 1925, is now known as Secretary to the Government (Regjeringsråd).

- State Secretary:
  - Halfdan Lehmann, – 1 February 1906
  - Nils Otto Hesselberg, 1 February 1906 –
- Director General in Stockholm
  - August Sibbern, in office until the office was abolished in 1906.
- Secretary to the President of the Norwegian Government
  - Paul Ivar Paulsen, in office until the office was abolished in 1906.
