= Kari-Margrete Rensel Løvgren =

Norwegian humanitarian and author

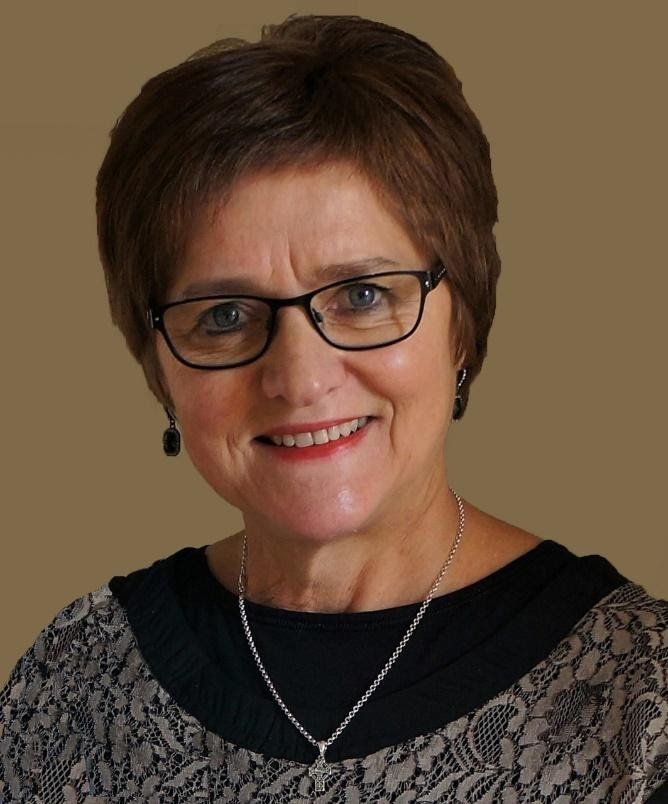
- Born: 1952 (age 73–74); Gol, Norway
- Occupations: Secretary, humanitarian worker, writer
- Notable credits: Heime – ei reise attende til barndom og oppvekst i Hallingdal; Fortellinger fra en emissærs dagbok; Articles at LOKALHISTORISK; Article: Bueskytteren – To tidsaldre speiles i hverandre; Article: Postmann med sekk og store lommer

Kari-Margrete Rensel Løvgren (born 1952) from Gol, living in Skien, is a secretary, and has worked in substance abuse care, the school- and health sector. Now she does her own literary work, editing books, and text dissemination. She is married to the Norwegian writer Tor Bertel Løvgren.

== Work ==
She published the book 'Heime' ('Home') in 2016, about her childhood on a farm in rural Hallingdal in the mountains of Norway, and her family history spanning six generations. Part of the story takes the reader to the US, with family members emigrating there in the 1870s. She also has produced and narrated books and radio series, and gives lectures in several topics such as the history of missionaries (preachers) from Hans Nilsen Hauge until the 70's in Norway and daily life in Norway in the 1900. She also does public poetry and prose readings and recently gave voice to two audiobooks. She and her husband run the publishing company, Serubabel Publishing.

== See also ==
Heime Overview

Immigrants (photo history)
