= Christopher Knudsen =

Norwegian priest and politician

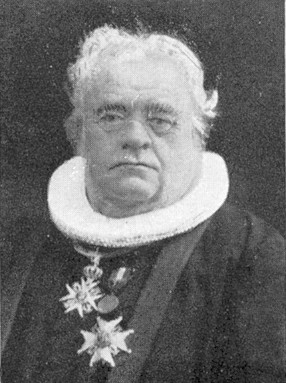

Member of the Norwegian Parliament
- In office 1 January 1895 – 31 December 1903
- Constituency: Tønsberg (1901-1903); Drammen (1895-1898)

Minister of Education and Church Affairs
- In office 11 March 1905 – 27 January 1906
- Prime Minister: Christian Michelsen
- Preceded by: Hans Nilsen Hauge
- Succeeded by: Otto Jensen

Personal details
- Born: 4 October 1843 Drammen, Buskerud, United Kingdoms of Sweden and Norway
- Died: 28 July 1915 (aged 71) Drammen, Buskerud, Norway
- Party: Conservative
- Spouse(s): Ida Regine Lohne; Marie Charlotte Andrea Hermanstorff (formerly)
- Profession: Priest

Christopher Knudsen (4 October 1843 – 28 July 1915) was a Norwegian priest and politician for the Conservative Party. He was Minister of Education and Church Affairs from 1905 to 1906.

Knudsen was born in Drammen as a son of railroad worker Knud Larssen (1814–66) and Marie A. Christophersen Aaserud (1812–1890). He was married twice; first from February 1869 to Marie Charlotte Andrea Hermanstorff (1849–1873), then from September 1874 to Ida Regine Lohne (1855–1949). He was an uncle of politician Knud Christian Knudsen.

He finished his secondary education in 1861, graduated with the cand.theol. degree in 1867, and in 1879 he became vicar in the newly established parish of Nedre Eiker. When Nedre Eiker became its own municipality in 1885, he sat in the municipal council and on the school board and was elected mayor. He left Nedre Eiker in 1886, and became a curate in Drammen. He was elected to the Parliament of Norway from that city in 1894 and 1897. He was then elected for a third term in 1900 from the constituency Tønsberg, where he had been appointed vicar.

On 11 March 1905, when Michelsen's Cabinet assumed office, Knudsen was appointed Norwegian Minister of Education and Church Affairs. This cabinet oversaw the dissolution of the union between Norway and Sweden in 1905. Knudsen left the cabinet on 26 January 1906.

Political offices
Preceded by Hans Nilsen Hauge	Norwegian Minister of Education and Church Affairs; 1905–1906	Succeeded by Otto Jensen
