= Otto Jensen (bishop) =

Norwegian bishop and politician (1856–1918)

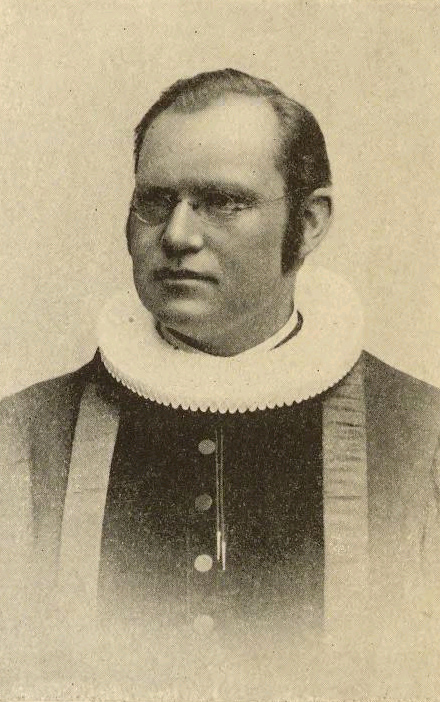

Minister of Education and Church Affairs
- In office 27 January 1906 – 23 October 1907
- Prime Minister: Christian Michelsen
- Preceded by: Christopher Knudsen
- Succeeded by: Abraham Berge

Personal details
- Born: 11 September 1856 Kongsberg, Buskerud, Sweden-Norway
- Died: 26 February 1918 (aged 61) Hamar, Hedmark, Norway
- Party: Independent
- Spouse: Marena Christine Pettersen (m. 1884)
- Children: Eivind Berggrav; Grete Berggrav

Otto Jensen (11 September 1856 – 26 February 1918) was a Norwegian bishop and politician. He was Minister of Education and Church Affairs from 1906 to 1907 and bishop of Hamar from 1917 to 1918.

He was born in Kongsberg as the son of sexton Even Jensen and his wife Inger Margrethe Berggrav. He enrolled as a student in 1874, and graduated in 1879 with the degree cand.theol. In 1880 he was hired as a school teacher in Kristiania. He left the city to become a high school teacher in Stavanger in 1883. From 1889 to 1899 he was a curate in Berg i Smaalenene; he subsequently returned to Stavanger to hold the same position there. In 1898 he had taken the doctorate at the University of Kristiania.

In 1906, Jensen left Stavanger for good as he was hired as a vicar in Skjeberg. However, already on 27 January the same year he was Norwegian Minister of Education and Church Affairs, replacing Christoffer Knudsen in the cabinet Michelsen. This was a coalition government, and Jensen was an independent. Jensen lost his job on 22 October 1907, when the cabinet Michelsen fell. He returned to the vicarship in Skjeberg. In Skjeberg he was a member of the local school board; he had chaired the school board while living in Stavanger. In 1912 he was hired as dean in the Diocese of Kristiania. In 1917 Jensen was appointed bishop of the Diocese of Hamar. He held this position until his death.

Otto Jensen was the father of Eivind Berggrav, who became a bishop too, and through him the grandfather of Dag Berggrav who became a civil servant and sports administrator.

Political offices
Preceded by Christoffer Knudsen	Norwegian Minister of Education and Church Affairs; 1906–1907	Succeeded by Abraham Berge
Church of Norway titles
Preceded by Christen Brun	Bishop of Hamar; 1917–1918	Succeeded by Gustav J. F. Dietrichson
