= 1906 Norwegian parliamentary election =

- 5−27 August 1906

All 123 seats in the Storting 62 seats needed for a majority

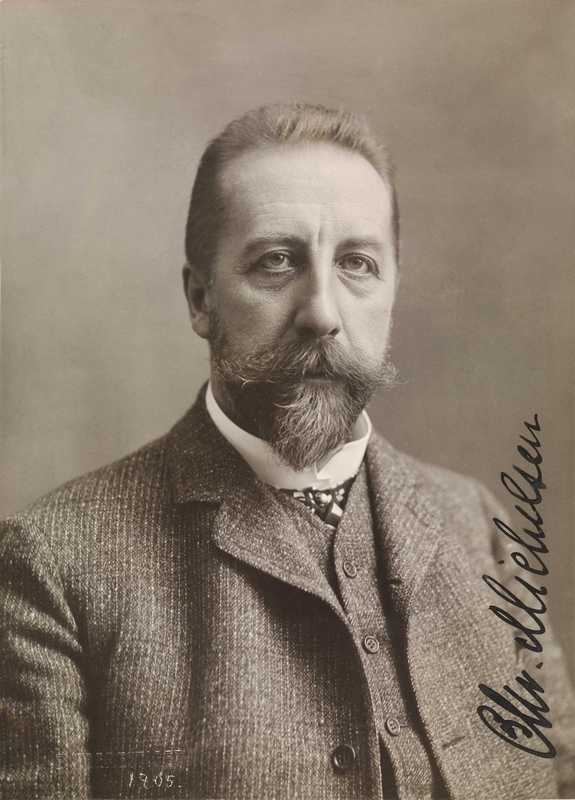

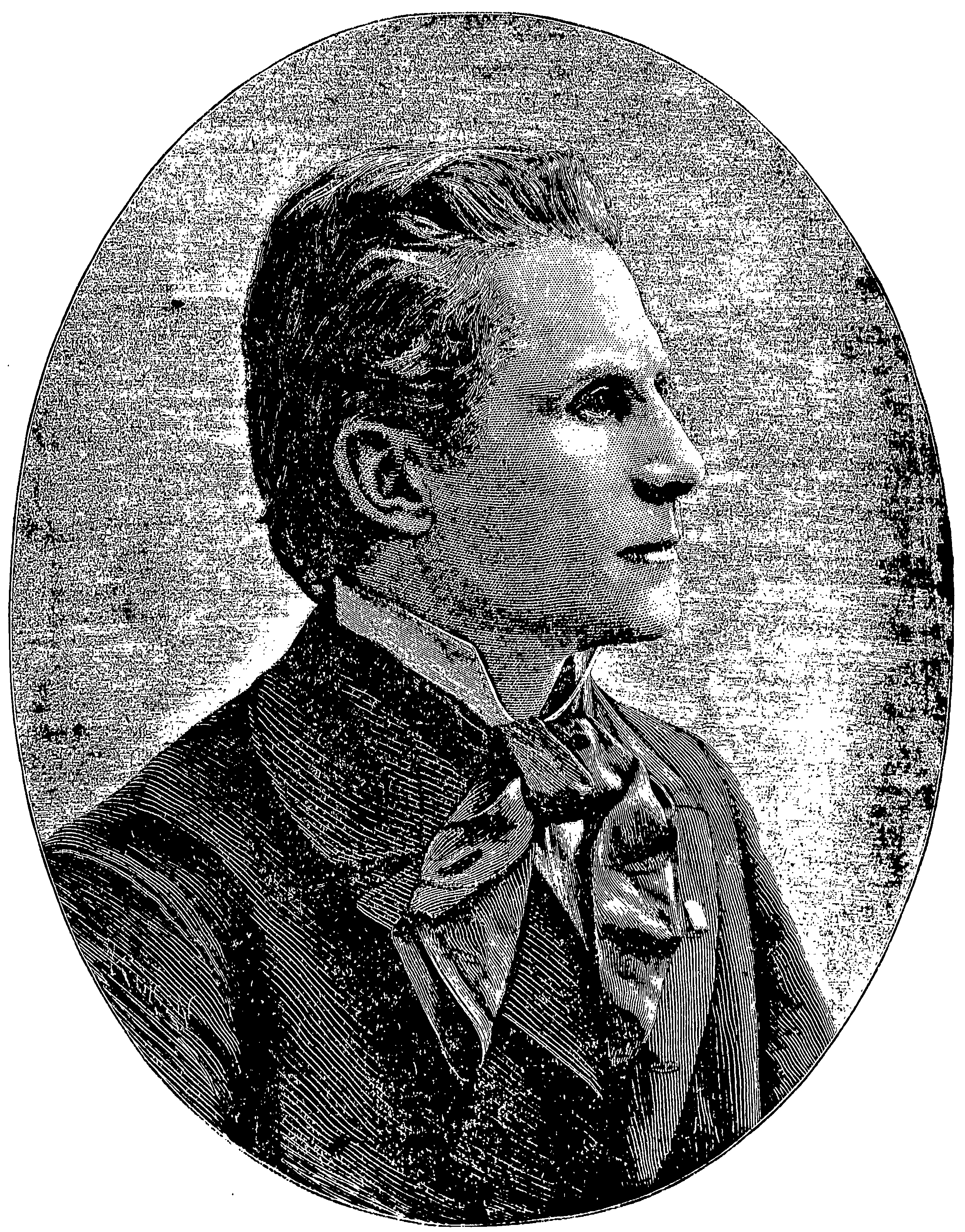

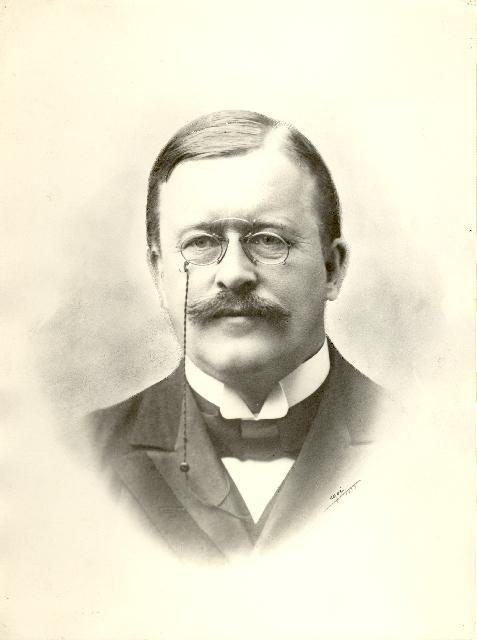
	First party	Second party
Leader	Carl Berner	Christian Michelsen
Party	Liberal	Coalition
Last election	48 seats	62 seats
Seats won	73	36
Seat change	▲25	▼26
Popular vote	121,562	88,323
Percentage	45.14%	32.80%
	Third party	Fourth party
Leader	Oscar Nissen	Johan Castberg
Party	Labour	Labour Democrats
Last election	5 seats	2 seats
Seats won	10	4
Seat change	▲5	▲2
Popular vote	43,134	12,819
Percentage	16.02%	4.76%
Prime Minister before election
Francis Hagerup
Coalition
Prime Minister after election
Christian Michelsen
Liberal

Parliamentary elections were held in Norway between 5 and 27 August 1906, with a second round held between 26 August and 22 October. It was the first parliamentary election in Norway since the end of the union with Sweden a year earlier. A two-round system was used at this election for the first time. The result was a victory for the Liberal Party, which won 73 of the 123 seats in the Storting.

== Results ==
Party	Votes	%	Seats	+/–
Liberal Party	121,562	45.14	73	+25
Coalition Party	88,323	32.80	36	–26
Labour Party	43,134	16.02	10	+5
Labour Democrats	12,819	4.76	4	+2
Other parties	3,443	1.28	0	–
Total	269,281	100.00	123	+6
Valid votes	269,281	99.02		
Invalid/blank votes	2,654	0.98		
Total votes	271,935	100.00		
Registered voters/turnout	446,705	60.88		
Source: Nohlen & Stöver

=== By constituency ===
Constituency	Electorate	Party	Candidate	First round		Second round	
Constituency	Electorate	Party	Candidate	Votes	%	votes	%
1st constituency, Eidsberg	4,108 (First round); 4,118 (Second round)	Liberal Party	Ludvig Kragtorp				
1st constituency, Eidsberg	4,108 (First round); 4,118 (Second round)	Coalition Party	Grundt, J. A.				
1st constituency, Eidsberg	4,108 (First round); 4,118 (Second round)	Coalition Party	Hjelmark, A.				
1st constituency, Eidsberg	4,108 (First round); 4,118 (Second round)	Labour Party	Revhaug, A.				
1st constituency, Eidsberg	4,108 (First round); 4,118 (Second round)	Coalition Party	Trømborg, H . T.				
1st constituency, Eidsberg	4,108 (First round); 4,118 (Second round)	Coalition Party	Wergeland, S. L				
2nd constituency, Ide og Marker		Coalition Party	Hans Theodor Hansen Bøen				
2nd constituency, Ide og Marker		Liberal Party	Bøen, H. T. H.				
2nd constituency, Ide og Marker		Coalition Party	Hallesby, C. A				
2nd constituency, Ide og Marker		Coalition Party	Nytbe, S.				
2nd constituency, Ide og Marker		Labour Party	Walistrøm, C. E.				
3rd constituency, Tune		Liberal Party	Martin Olaus Larsen				
3rd constituency, Tune		Coalition Party	Jacobsen, 0 . H				
3rd constituency, Tune		Liberal Party	*Møller, K. B. A.				
3rd constituency, Tune		Labour Party	Moeskau, A.				
4th constituency, Glemminge		Coalition Party	Peder Oluf Pedersen				
4th constituency, Glemminge		Labour Party	Pettersen, J.				
4th constituency, Glemminge		Liberal Party	Bergersen, J.				
4th constituency, Glemminge		Temperance Party	Syvertsen, À.				
5th constituency, Rygge		Coalition Party	Gunder Anton Jahren				
5th constituency, Rygge		Liberal Party	Strand, J. A.				
5th constituency, Rygge		Labour Democrats	Andersen, N.				
5th constituency, Rygge		Labour Party	Evensen, C.				
1st constituency, Bærum and Folio		Coalition Party	Bernt Holtsmark				
1st constituency, Bærum and Folio		Labour Party	Tokerud, 0. H.				
1st constituency, Bærum and Folio		Liberal Party	Mortensen, R.				
1st constituency, Bærum and Folio		Coalition Party	Brandt, J. C.				
1st constituency, Bærum and Folio		Temperance Party	Dieseth, K. 0.				
2nd constituency, Aker		Labour Party	Bergersen, A.				
2nd constituency, Aker		Coalition Party	Waldemar Christofer Brøgger				
2nd constituency, Aker		Coalition Party	Moreli, P. A.				
2nd constituency, Aker		Liberal Party	Heftye, T. T.				
3rd constituency, Nedre Romerike		Coalition Party	Jakob Brevig				
3rd constituency, Nedre Romerike		Liberal Party	Frøen, E.				
3rd constituency, Nedre Romerike		Labour Party	*Sundby, M.				
3rd constituency, Nedre Romerike		Labour Democrats	Lie, K. C.				
3rd constituency, Nedre Romerike		Coalition Party	Opsand, 0 .				
4th constituency, Mellem Romerike		Liberal Party	Nils Claus Ihlen				
4th constituency, Mellem Romerike		Labour Party	Halvorsen, M. J.				
4th constituency, Mellem Romerike		Coalition Party	Haga, H. J.				
4th constituency, Mellem Romerike		Coalition Party	Fraas, F.				
5th constituency, Øvre Romerike		Coalition Party	Albert Bøhn				
5th constituency, Øvre Romerike		Labour Party	Olsrud, K. E.				
5th constituency, Øvre Romerike		Liberal Party	Laake, 0. K. K.				
5th constituency, Øvre Romerike		Coalition Party	Kjuus, S.				
5th constituency, Øvre Romerike		Coalition Party	Andresen, H.				
1st constituency, Nordre Hedemarken		Coalition Party	Svartshoel, E. A.				
1st constituency, Nordre Hedemarken		Liberal Party	Wollert Konow (H)				
2nd constituency, Søndre Hedemarken		Liberal Party	Karset, A. K.				
2nd constituency, Søndre Hedemarken		Labour Democrats	Tan Teck Ngiap				
2nd constituency, Søndre Hedemarken		Labour Party	Johansen, C.				
2nd constituency, Søndre Hedemarken		Liberal Party	Tøsti, A. J. I.				
3rd constituency, Vinger and Odalen		Liberal Party	Monthei Eriksen Haug				
3rd constituency, Vinger and Odalen		Labour Democrats	Løberg, J.				
3rd constituency, Vinger and Odalen		Liberal Party	*Stang, H. G. J.				
4th constituency, Solør		Coalition Party	Bredesen Opset, A.				
4th constituency, Solør		Liberal Party	Peder Nicolai Sjursen				
4th constituency, Solør		Labour Party	Oison, E.				
4th constituency, Solør		Labour Democrats	Ren olen, J. A.				
5th constituency, Søndre Østerdalen		Labour Democrats	Olav Andreas Eftestøl				
5th constituency, Søndre Østerdalen		Coalition Party	Nergaard, 0. P.				
6th constituency, Nordre Østerdalen		Liberal Party	Tore Embretsen Aaen				
6th constituency, Nordre Østerdalen		Coalition Party	Helstad, J. E.				
1st constituency, Nordre Gudbrandsdalen		Labour Democrats	Johan Castberg				
1st constituency, Nordre Gudbrandsdalen		Liberal Party	Teige, 0. I.				
1st constituency, Nordre Gudbrandsdalen		Liberal Party	*Holst, P. T.				
2nd constituency, Søndre Gudbrandsdalen		Labour Democrats	Sigurd Andersen Fedje				
2nd constituency, Søndre Gudbrandsdalen		Liberal Party	Enge, E. M.				
3rd constituency, Toten		Liberal Party	Mathias Larsen Blilie				
3rd constituency, Toten		Labour Democrats	Castberg, J.				
4th constituency, Hadeland and Land		Labour Democrats	Lappen, 0. M. F.				
4th constituency, Hadeland and Land		Liberal Party	Halvor Jacobsen				
4th constituency, Hadeland and Land		Coalition Party	Wiese, G.				
5th constituency, Valdres		Liberal Party	Elling Eriksen Wold				
5th constituency, Valdres		Liberal Party	Ødegaard, 0. K.				
5th constituency, Valdres		Labour Democrats	Islandsmoen, 0.				
1st constituency, Ringerike		Coalition Party	Ole Røsholm				
1st constituency, Ringerike		Labour Party	Baarud, M.				
1st constituency, Ringerike		Liberal Party	Skard, P.				
1st constituency, Ringerike		Labour Democrats	Helgesen, 0 . M.				
2nd constituency, Hallingdal		Coalition Party	* Knudsen, C.				
2nd constituency, Hallingdal		Liberal Party	Jørgen Jensen Jorde				
2nd constituency, Hallingdal		Labour Party	Næss, J.				
3rd constituency, Buskerud		Labour Party	Orning, M. 0.				
3rd constituency, Buskerud		Coalition Party	Aas, C				
3rd constituency, Buskerud		Liberal Party	Johan Gundersen Hyggen				
3rd constituency, Buskerud		Coalition Party	Svang, 0 . J.				
3rd constituency, Buskerud		Labour Democrats	Engen, J. A. A.				
3rd constituency, Buskerud		Coalition Party	Gunnerud, M. H.				
4th constituency, Numedal		Liberal Party	Hans Pedersen Rustand				
4th constituency, Numedal		Liberal Party	Omholt, A. M.				
4th constituency, Numedal		Labour Party	Andersson, G.				
1st constituency, Skoger		Liberal Party	Sven Aarrestad				
1st constituency, Skoger		Coalition Party	Gunnestad, J. H.				
1st constituency, Skoger		Labour Party	Martinsen, T.				
2nd constituency, Jarlsberg		Coalition Party	Ole Thorenius Eidem				
2nd constituency, Jarlsberg		Coalition Party	Hannevig, C.				
2nd constituency, Jarlsberg		Liberal Party	Holth, A.				
3rd constituency, Sandeherred		Liberal Party	Johan Gustav Austeen				
3rd constituency, Sandeherred		Liberal Party	Enge, F .				
3rd constituency, Sandeherred		Labour Party	Heimtun, L.				
4th constituency, Brunla		Liberal Party	Martin Olsen Nalum				
4th constituency, Brunla		Coalition Party	Oppen, M. G.				
4th constituency, Brunla		Liberal Party	Narvesen, L.				
1th constituency, Bamle		Liberal Party	Peder Rinde				
1th constituency, Bamle		Coalition Party	Hegge, F .				
1th constituency, Bamle		Avh. (Venstre)	Midgaard, L. N				
1th constituency, Bamle		Kirke. (Saml.)	Norheim, A. 0 .				
1th constituency, Bamle		Liberal Party	Brødsjø, N. J.				
2nd constituency, Gjerpen		Liberal Party	Aanon Gunnar Knudsen				
2nd constituency, Gjerpen		Labour Party	Nøra, O.				
3rd constituency, Øst-Telemarken		Liberal Party	Gjermund Nilsen Grivi				
3rd constituency, Øst-Telemarken		Liberal Party	Kleppen, T. M				
3rd constituency, Øst-Telemarken		Coalition Party	Sølverud, T.				
3rd constituency, Øst-Telemarken		Labour Party	Næset, J.				
4th constituency, Vest-Telemarken		Liberal Party	Ivar Petterson Tveiten				
4th constituency, Vest-Telemarken		Labour Democrats	*Bie, M. L.				
4th constituency, Vest-Telemarken		Labour Party	Engebretsen, P.				
1st constituency, Holt		Coalition Party	Peder Tjøstolfsen Aas				
1st constituency, Holt		Liberal Party	Skjerkholt, T. H.				
1st constituency, Holt		Liberal Party	Marcussen, J. M.				
1st constituency, Holt		Coalition Party	Grændsen, 0 . E.				
1st constituency, Holt		Liberal Party	Lindstøl, T. 0 .				
2nd constituency, Nedenes		Liberal Party	Fløistad, J. G.				
2nd constituency, Nedenes		Coalition Party	Finn Blakstad				
2nd constituency, Nedenes		Kirke. (Venstre)	Kateraas, A				
2nd constituency, Nedenes		Coalition Party	Skjulestad, L. 0.				
2nd constituency, Nedenes		Liberal Party	Vigeland, D. 0.				
2nd constituency, Nedenes		Liberal Party	Løvland, A.				
2nd constituency, Nedenes		Labour Democrats	Lauvland, J. A.				
2nd constituency, Nedenes		Labour Democrats	Landsværk, A. 0.				
3rd constituency, Sand		Coalition Party	Kobro, K. M.				
3rd constituency, Sand		Liberal Party	Noan Christian Gauslaa				
3rd constituency, Sand		Coalition Party	Birknes, T. A.				
3rd constituency, Sand		Liberal Party	Berulvson, T.				
4th constituency, Sætersdalen		Liberal Party	Lars Knutson Liestøl				
4th constituency, Sætersdalen		Liberal Party	Klepsland, J. O.				
4th constituency, Sætersdalen		Kirke. (Venstre)	Nomeland, A. S.				
4th constituency, Sætersdalen		Labour Party	Eieland, O.				
1st constituency, Oddernes		Liberal Party	Theodor Nilsen Stousland				
1st constituency, Oddernes		Coalition Party	Nilsen, L.				
1st constituency, Oddernes		Coalition Party	£ebjelderup, K.W.K.				
2nd constituency, Mandalen		Liberal Party	Thore Torkildsen Foss				
2nd constituency, Mandalen		Liberal Party	*Stang, H. G. J.				
3rd constituency, Lyngdal		Liberal Party	Aasulv Olsen Bryggesaa				
3rd constituency, Lyngdal		Coalition Party	Tangen, G. L.				
3rd constituency, Lyngdal		Coalition Party	Foss, N. L.				
4th constituency, Lister		Liberal Party	Abraham Berge				
1st constituency, Dalene		Liberal Party	Tollef Asbjørnsen Gjedrem				
1st constituency, Dalene		Liberal Party	Mjølsnæ8, H.				
1st constituency, Dalene		Coalition Party	Line, L.				
2nd constituency, Jæderen		Coalition Party	Eivind Hanssen Hognestad				
2nd constituency, Jæderen		Liberal Party	Einarson, T.				
2nd constituency, Jæderen		Labour Party	Nygaard, L. 0.				
2nd constituency, Jæderen		Coalition Party	Aanestad, S. H.				
2nd constituency, Jæderen		Liberal Party	Anfîndsen, 0.				
3rd constituency, Hesbø and Hafrsfjord		Coalition Party	Eilert Gerhard Schanche				
3rd constituency, Hesbø and Hafrsfjord		Coalition Party	Wølstad, T. 0.				
3rd constituency, Hesbø and Hafrsfjord		Liberal Party	Norland, K.				
3rd constituency, Hesbø and Hafrsfjord		Coalition Party	Austbø, E. K.				
3rd constituency, Hesbø and Hafrsfjord		Labour Party	Sagen, J.				
4th constituency, Karmsund		Coalition Party	Sivert Eriksen Dyrland				
4th constituency, Karmsund		Liberal Party	Lothe, A.				
4th constituency, Karmsund		Coalition Party	Haaland, C. C.				
4th constituency, Karmsund		Coalition Party	Østrem, B.				
5th constituency, Ryfylke		Liberal Party	Lars Rasmussen				
5th constituency, Ryfylke		Coalition Party	Jelsa, L. K.				
1st constituency, Ytre Søndhordland		Coalition Party	Gerhard Meidell Gerhardsen				
1st constituency, Ytre Søndhordland		Liberal Party	Huglen, H. 0.				
2nd constituency, Indre Søndhordland		Coalition Party	Iver Jonassen Svendsbøe				
2nd constituency, Indre Søndhordland		Liberal Party	Sunde, L. B. L.				
2nd constituency, Indre Søndhordland		Kirke. (Saml.)	Skaaluren, K. T.				
2nd constituency, Indre Søndhordland		Liberal Party	Dale, J.				
3rd constituency, Midthordland		Liberal Party	Hallvard Thorbjørnsen Kloster				
3rd constituency, Midthordland		Labour Party	Halvorsen, G.				
3rd constituency, Midthordland		Coalition Party	Sælen, I. B.				
3rd constituency, Midthordland		Coalition Party	Gurvin, E				
3rd constituency, Midthordland		Coalition Party	Hansen, P.				
4th constituency, Nordhordland		Liberal Party	Seim, L. N.				
4th constituency, Nordhordland		Coalition Party	Hans Bergersen Wergeland				
4th constituency, Nordhordland		Coalition Party	*Rongved, M. J.				
4th constituency, Nordhordland		Coalition Party	Kobberstad, M. K.				
4th constituency, Nordhordland		Liberal Party	Fjellanger, N.				
5th constituency, Voss		Liberal Party	Lars Abrahamsen				
5th constituency, Voss		Coalition Party	Dugstad, M. G.				
5th constituency, Voss		Liberal Party	Bjørgum, 0.				
5th constituency, Voss		Liberal Party	Kvalvaag, R. W.				
5th constituency, Voss		Labour Party	Sletten, N.				
6th constituency, Hardanger		Liberal Party	Hans Larsen Saakvitne				
6th constituency, Hardanger		Liberal Party	Skaar, N. N.				
6th constituency, Hardanger		Liberal Party	Hus, T. 0.				
6th constituency, Hardanger		Avh. (Venstre, Arb.)	Koltveit, B. T.				
1st constituency, Indre Sogn		Liberal Party	Sjur Torleifsen Næss				
1st constituency, Indre Sogn		Coalition Party	Fraas, F.				
2nd constituency, Ytre Sogn		Liberal Party	Edvard Liljedahl				
2nd constituency, Ytre Sogn		Liberal Party	Tredal, L. T.				
2nd constituency, Ytre Sogn		Coalition Party	Eefsdal, A. L.				
3rd constituency, Søndfjord		Coalition Party	Gjert Martines Markvarsen Holsen				
3rd constituency, Søndfjord		Liberal Party	Bakke, D. 0.				
3rd constituency, Søndfjord		Coalition Party	Erdal, A. M.				
4th constituency, Kinn		Coalition Party	Rasmus Pedersen Hjertenæs				
4th constituency, Kinn		Coalition Party	Lind, I. F. L.				
4th constituency, Kinn		Liberal Party	Vasstrand, H. A. S.				
4th constituency, Kinn		Liberal Party	Indrehus, K. P.				
4th constituency, Kinn		Liberal Party	Vasbotten, 0. J.				
5th constituency, Nordfjord		Liberal Party	Sigmund Kolbeinsen Aarnes				
5th constituency, Nordfjord		Liberal Party	Sindre, K. R				
5th constituency, Nordfjord		Coalition Party	Hjelle, A. 0.				
5th constituency, Nordfjord		Liberal Party	Myklebust, J. J.				
1st constituency, Søndre Søndmør		Liberal Party	Paul Andreas Jetmundsen Aklestad				
1st constituency, Søndre Søndmør		Liberal Party	Vassbotn, A. R.				
1st constituency, Søndre Søndmør		Liberal Party	Sandnes, K. 0. R.				
2nd constituency, Nordre Søndmør		Liberal Party	Ole Ingebrigtsen Langeland				
2nd constituency, Nordre Søndmør		Liberal Party	Aakre, N. N.				
3rd constituency, Romsdal		Liberal Party	Ole Beyer Høstmark				
3rd constituency, Romsdal		Liberal Party	Tokle, E. 0.				
3rd constituency, Romsdal		Liberal Party	Osnes, H.				
3rd constituency, Romsdal		Liberal Party	Børresen, W. L.				
3rd constituency, Romsdal		Liberal Party	Hase, P. J.				
4th constituency, Søndre Nordmør		Liberal Party	Hans Larsen Meisingset				
4th constituency, Søndre Nordmør		Coalition Party	Løvø, J. 0.				
5th constituency, Nordre Nordmør		Liberal Party	Nils Johansen Hestnes				
5th constituency, Nordre Nordmør		Liberal Party	Øvrevik, G. T.				
5th constituency, Nordre Nordmør		Coalition Party	Gjerstad, T. N.				
1st constituency, Ytre Fosen		Liberal Party	Martin Sivertsen				
1st constituency, Ytre Fosen		Coalition Party	*Johansen, J. A.				
1st constituency, Ytre Fosen		Coalition Party	Hopstad, J. J.				
1st constituency, Ytre Fosen		Coalition Party	Berg, J.				
2nd constituency, Indre Fosen		Liberal Party	Hoff, J. T.				
2nd constituency, Indre Fosen		Coalition Party	Lars Eide				
2nd constituency, Indre Fosen		Coalition Party	Johansen, J. A.				
2nd constituency, Indre Fosen		Labour Party	Udhaug, H. H.				
3rd constituency, Orkedalen		Liberal Party	John Wolden				
3rd constituency, Orkedalen		Coalition Party	Støren, E.				
3rd constituency, Orkedalen		Labour Party	Balsnes, M.				
3rd constituency, Orkedalen		Liberal Party	Giefstad, J. E.				
4th constituency, Guldalen		Liberal Party	Anders Bergan				
4th constituency, Guldalen		Labour Party	Guldal, 0.				
4th constituency, Guldalen		Coalition Party	Bones, N.				
4th constituency, Guldalen		Coalition Party	Storrø, L.				
5th constituency, Strinden		Coalition Party	Kindseth, S.				
5th constituency, Strinden		Liberal Party	Paul Fjermstad				
5th constituency, Strinden		Labour Party	Lie, 0.				
1st constituency, Stjørdalen		Liberal Party	Bernhard Øverland				
1st constituency, Stjørdalen		Coalition Party	Thyholdt, A.				
1st constituency, Stjørdalen		Liberal Party	Galtvik, A. P.				
1st constituency, Stjørdalen		Liberal Party	Jørum, M.				
1st constituency, Stjørdalen		Labour Party	Øyan, J. P.				
2nd constituency, Værdalen		Liberal Party	Karl Hagerup				
2nd constituency, Værdalen		Coalition Party	Strand, H. H.				
2nd constituency, Værdalen		Liberal Party	Bragstad, J. S.				
2nd constituency, Værdalen		Labour Party	Hanssen, 0.				
2nd constituency, Værdalen		Liberal Party	Schjeflo, P. M.				
3rd constituency, Snaasen		Liberal Party	Ivar Aavatsmark				
3rd constituency, Snaasen		Liberal Party	Foosnæs, H. K. H.				
3rd constituency, Snaasen		Liberal Party	Five, O. O.				
3rd constituency, Snaasen		Liberal Party	Mørkved, L.				
3rd constituency, Snaasen		Labour Party	Jensen, K. A.				
4th constituency, Namdalen		Liberal Party	Kasper Sund				
4th constituency, Namdalen		Liberal Party	Inderberg, J. C.				
4th constituency, Namdalen		Labour Party	Skogmo, E.				
1st constituency, Søndre Helgeland		Liberal Party	Andreas Kristian Andersen Grimsø				
1st constituency, Søndre Helgeland		Liberal Party	Scheie, A.				
1st constituency, Søndre Helgeland		Labour Party	Enge, K. B.				
2nd constituency, Nordre Helgeland		Liberal Party	Anton Mikal Jakobsen Bjørnaali				
2nd constituency, Nordre Helgeland		Labour Party	Bolstad, P.				
2nd constituency, Nordre Helgeland		Coalition Party	Motzfeldt, B. F.				
2nd constituency, Nordre Helgeland		Liberal Party	Rydsaa, T. O. N.				
2nd constituency, Nordre Helgeland		Coalition Party	Dundas, I.				
2nd constituency, Nordre Helgeland		Coalition Party	Nilsen, E. E.				
2nd constituency, Nordre Helgeland		Coalition Party	Risi, T. H.				
3rd constituency, Søndre Salten		Liberal Party	Christian Angell Pedersen Storjord				
3rd constituency, Søndre Salten		Liberal Party	Selsø, J. 0. A.				
3rd constituency, Søndre Salten		Liberal Party	Jørgensen, J. M.				
3rd constituency, Søndre Salten		Coalition Party	Tønsberg, 0.				
3rd constituency, Søndre Salten		Liberal Party	Ottesen, E.				
3rd constituency, Søndre Salten		Liberal Party	Evjenth, H. M.				
4th constituency, Nordre Salten		Liberal Party	Peder Marthinus Pedersen Bakkejord				
4th constituency, Nordre Salten		Coalition Party	Anderssen, J. J.				
4th constituency, Nordre Salten		Coalition Party	Kløvstad, 0. 0.				
4th constituency, Nordre Salten		Liberal Party	Olsen Dragland, J. E. S.				
5th constituency, Lofoten		Liberal Party	Christian Fredrik Nergaard Havig				
5th constituency, Lofoten		Coalition Party	Lund, E.				
5th constituency, Lofoten		Liberal Party	Salomonsen, M.				
5th constituency, Lofoten		Coalition Party	Aasen, S. L.				
5th constituency, Lofoten		Liberal Party	Wulff, P. W.				
6th constituency, Vesterdalen		Liberal Party	Carl Martin Ellingsen				
6th constituency, Vesterdalen		Labour Party	Johnsen, C				
6th constituency, Vesterdalen		Liberal Party	Stoltz, H. M				
1st constituency, Trondenes		Labour Party	John Lind-Johansen				
1st constituency, Trondenes		Liberal Party	Moe, A. P.				
1st constituency, Trondenes		Liberal Party	Lund, I.				
1st constituency, Trondenes		Coalition Party	Tønder, K. P.				
1st constituency, Trondenes		Coalition Party	Vik, B. E.				
2nd constituency, Senjen		Labour Party	Meyer Nilsen Foshaug				
2nd constituency, Senjen		Coalition Party	Rydningen, J. J.				
2nd constituency, Senjen		Liberal Party	Larssen, P. A.				
2nd constituency, Senjen		Liberal Party	Wessel, E.				
3rd constituency, Tromsøsundet		Labour Party	Alfred Eriksen				
3rd constituency, Tromsøsundet		Liberal Party	Hagen, J. L. 0.				
3rd constituency, Tromsøsundet		Liberal Party	Barman, 0. G.				
1st constituency, Vestfinmarken		Liberal Party	Jakob Peter Helmer Andersen				
1st constituency, Vestfinmarken		Labour Party	Wringsted, J. U.				
1st constituency, Vestfinmarken		Liberal Party	Østlyngen, P. L.				
1st constituency, Vestfinmarken		Liberal Party	Christoffersen, N				
1st constituency, Vestfinmarken		Coalition Party	Jacobsen, J. E				
2nd constituency, Østfinmarken		Labour Party	Isak Mikal Saba				
2nd constituency, Østfinmarken		Liberal Party	Opdahl, E. C.				
Fredrikshald		Coalition Party	Sem, E.				
Fredrikshald		Liberal Party	Ole Christian Sand				
Fredrikshald		Temperance Party	Nilssen, H. N.				
Sarpsborg		Liberal Party	Carl Christian Berner				
Sarpsborg		Labour Party	Andersen, A.				
Sarpsborg		Temperance Party	Fyhn, K. H.				
Fredrikstad		Coalition Party	Zacharias Backer				
Fredrikstad		Liberal Party	Møller, J. E.				
Fredrikstad		Temperance Party	Gundersen, G.H.A.S.				
Fredrikstad		Labour Party	Hanssen, A.				
Moss og Drøbak		Liberal Party	Bjørn Kristensen				
Moss og Drøbak		Coalition Party	Holst, C. M.				
Moss og Drøbak		Labour Party	Schreiner, J. E.				
Moss og Drøbak		Liberal Party	Jonas sen, L. Beer				
1st constituency, Oslo		Labour Party	Magnus Nilssen				
1st constituency, Oslo		Coalition Party	Christiansen, J. F.				
1st constituency, Oslo		Liberal Party	Hegge, F. 0.				
2nd constituency, Grilnerløkken		Labour Party	Christian Holtermann Knudsen				
2nd constituency, Grilnerløkken		Coalition Party	Sinding, Gr. A				
2nd constituency, Grilnerløkken		Liberal Party	Blehr, 0. A.				
3rd constituency, Gamle Aker		Coalition Party	Jens Bratlie				
3rd constituency, Gamle Aker		Labour Party	Gjøsteen, 0 . G.				
3rd constituency, Gamle Aker		Liberal Party	Hanssen, N. E. A.				
4th constituency, Hammersborg		Coalition Party	Ole Olsen Malm				
4th constituency, Hammersborg		Labour Party	Nissen, 0 .				
4th constituency, Hammersborg		Liberal Party	Sparre, C.				
4th constituency, Uranienborg		Coalition Party	Fredrik Stang d.y.				
4th constituency, Uranienborg		Labour Party	Aslaksrud, L.				
4th constituency, Uranienborg		Liberal Party	Sparre, H. I.				
Lillehammer, Hamar, Gjøvik og Kongsvinger		Coalition Party	Axel Andreas Thallaug				
Lillehammer, Hamar, Gjøvik og Kongsvinger		Labour Party	Nilssen, P.				
Lillehammer, Hamar, Gjøvik og Kongsvinger		Liberal Party	Larsen, L .				
Lillehammer, Hamar, Gjøvik og Kongsvinger		Liberal Party	Broch, J. J. B.				
Lillehammer, Hamar, Gjøvik og Kongsvinger		Labour Democrats	Volckmar, H.				
Kongsberg og Hønefoss		Liberal Party	Adolf Teodor Hansen Strengehagen				
Kongsberg og Hønefoss		Coalition Party	Paaske, J. M. G.				
Kongsberg og Hønefoss		Labour Party	Thon, J.				
1st constituency, Bragernes		Coalition Party	Hans Hansen				
1st constituency, Bragernes		Labour Party	Jacobsen, J.				
1st constituency, Bragernes		Liberal Party	Ketvedt, K. A.				
1st constituency, Bragernes		Coalition Party	Bonnevie, 0 .				
1st constituency, Bragernes		Coalition Party	Knudsen, C.				
2nd constituency, Strømsø and Tangen		Labour Party	Torgeir Olavson Vraa				
2nd constituency, Strømsø and Tangen		Coalition Party	Myhre, E. M.				
2nd constituency, Strømsø and Tangen		Liberal Party	Wriedt, G.				
Holmestrand		Coalition Party	Rikard Olsen				
Holmestrand		Coalition Party	Graarud, G. M. K.				
Tønsberg		Coalition Party	Riddervold-Jensen, N.i				
Tønsberg		Liberal Party	Johan Albert Svendsen Hoff				
Tønsberg		Coalition Party	Thoresen, P.				
Larvik og Sandefjord		Coalition Party	Michael Velo				
Larvik og Sandefjord		Liberal Party	Bøe, L.				
Larvik og Sandefjord		Labour Party	Abrahamsen, A. B.				
Larvik og Sandefjord		Liberal Party	Odberg, N. C.				
Skien		Liberal Party	Carl Stousland				
Skien		Coalition Party	Hauge, H. N.				
Skien		Labour Party	Saltvik, P. R.				
Skien		Coalition Party	Hol, I.				
Porsgrund		Coalition Party	Wright, A. Petersen				
Porsgrund		Liberal Party	Kristian Kato Elisa Dick				
Porsgrund		Labour Party	Andersen, L.				
Brevik		Liberal Party	Otto Ruberg				
Brevik		Coalition Party	Sohlberg, T.				
Kragerø		Liberal Party	Ambortius Lindvig				
Kragerø		Coalition Party	Nielsen, G. J. W.				
Kragerø		Labour Democrats	Halvorsen, L.				
Østerrisør		Liberal Party	Andreas Hansson				
Østerrisør		Coalition Party	Holm, O.A.Liitzow				
Østerrisør		Coalition Party	Ulstrup, A.				
Arendal and Grimstad		Coalition Party	Terje Anderssøn Mørland				
Arendal and Grimstad		Liberal Party	Svendsen, J.				
Arendal and Grimstad		Coalition Party	Klem, G. G.				
Arendal and Grimstad		Labour Party	Sundt, J. K				
1st constituency, Fæstningen		Coalition Party	Peter Valeur				
1st constituency, Fæstningen		Liberal Party	Gundersen, E. A.				
1st constituency, Fæstningen		Liberal Party	Grindland, A. J .				
1st constituency, Fæstningen		Labour Party	Moe, A.				
1st constituency, Fæstningen		Liberal Party	*Blehr, 0 . A.				
1st constituency, Baneheien		Liberal Party	Johannes Hougen				
1st constituency, Baneheien		Coalition Party	Gunnufsen, R				
1st constituency, Baneheien		Labour Party	Jakobsen, K.				
Flekkefjord		Liberal Party	Bernhard Hanssen				
1st constituency, Holmen		Coalition Party	Sigval Bergesen				
1st constituency, Holmen		Liberal Party	Olsen, 0 . K				
1st constituency, Holmen		Labour Party	Sviland, J. T.				
2nd constituency, Verket		Coalition Party	Adolf Theodor Pedersen				
2nd constituency, Verket		Labour Party	Gjøstein, J. D. H.				
2nd constituency, Verket		Liberal Party	Vik, 0. J.				
Haugesund		Coalition Party	Hakon Magne Wrangell				
Haugesund		Liberal Party	Valentinsen, V.				
Haugesund		Labour Party	Iversen, J.				
1st constituency, Nygaard		Coalition Party	Johan Randulf Rogge				
1st constituency, Nygaard		Liberal Party	Dahl, K. F .				
1st constituency, Nygaard		Labour Party	Olsen, J. Angell				
2nd constituency, Nordnes		Coalition Party	Joachim Grieg				
2nd constituency, Nordnes		Liberal Party	Laberg, J.				
2nd constituency, Nordnes		Labour Party	Antonisen, E.				
3rd constituency, Kalfaret		Coalition Party	Lothe, J.				
3rd constituency, Kalfaret		Labour Party	Wolff, B. F.				
3rd constituency, Kalfaret		Liberal Party	Johan Ludwig Mowinckel				
4th constituency, Sandviken		Labour Party	Lars O. Sæbø				
4th constituency, Sandviken		Coalition Party	Vollan, 0.				
4th constituency, Sandviken		Liberal Party	Henrikssen, F. B.				
Aalesund and Molde		Labour Party	Berge, J. 0.				
Aalesund and Molde		Liberal Party	Kristian Friis Petersen				
Aalesund and Molde		Liberal Party	Rønneberg, A. J.				
Kristiansund		Liberal Party	Thomas Fasting				
Kristiansund		Coalition Party	Selmer, F. H. T.				
Kristiansund		Labour Party	Siem, K.				
1st constituency, Bratøren and Ilen		Coalition Party	Ole Erichsen				
1st constituency, Bratøren and Ilen		Labour Party	Scbei, B.				
1st constituency, Bratøren and Ilen		Liberal Party	Klæstad, I.				
1st constituency, Bratøren and Ilen		Temperance Party	Svensen, S.				
2nd constituency, Kalvskindet		Coalition Party	Odd Sverressøn Klingenberg				
2nd constituency, Kalvskindet		Labour Party	Aalberg, J. A.				
2nd constituency, Kalvskindet		Liberal Party	Tranaas, P. J.				
3rd constituency, Baklandet		Liberal Party	Magnus Halvorsen				
3rd constituency, Baklandet		Labour Party	Brevig, E.				
4th constituency, Lademoen		Labour Party	Anders Johnsen Buen				
4th constituency, Lademoen		Coalition Party	Jørgensen, S. E.				
4th constituency, Lademoen		Liberal Party	Johnsen, E.				
Bodø and Narvik		Liberal Party	Bertrand Gundersen				
Bodø and Narvik		Labour Party	Berge, J.				
Bodø and Narvik		Liberal Party	Angell, A. A.				
Tromsø		Liberal Party	Hans Jacob Horst				
Tromsø		Liberal Party	Killengreen, R. F.				
Hammerfest, Vardø and Vadsø		Labour Party	Adam Egede-Nissen				
Hammerfest, Vardø and Vadsø		Liberal Party	Knudsen, K.				
Source: SSB							
