= Knud Knudsen =

Knud Knudsen is the name of:

- Knud Knudsen (linguist) (1812–1895), Norwegian linguist
- Knud Knudsen (photographer) (1832–1915), professional photographer
- Knud Leonard Knudsen (1879–1954), gymnast
- Knud Christian Knudsen (1887–1969), Norwegian merchant and politician
- Knut Knudsen (born 12 October 1950), retired Norwegian road and track cyclist
