= Harald Bothner =

Norwegian politician (1850–1924)

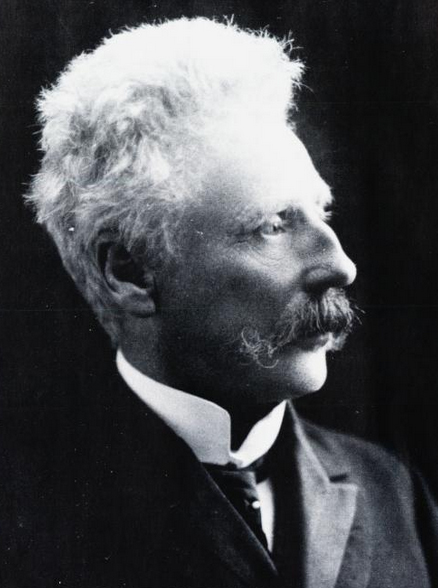

County Governor of Sør-Trøndelag
- In office 1 November 1907 – 30 June 1921
- Monarch: Haakon VII
- Prime Minister: Jørgen Løvland; Gunnar Knudsen; Wollert Konow; Jens Bratlie; Otto B. Halvorsen; Otto Blehr
- Preceded by: Lars O. R. Grundt
- Succeeded by: Odd Klingenberg

Minister of Justice
- In office 27 November 1905 – 23 October 1907
- Prime Minister: Christian Michelsen
- Preceded by: Edvard H. Bull
- Succeeded by: Johan Bredal

Minister of Auditing
- In office 7 June 1905 – 27 November 1905
- Prime Minister: Christian Michelsen
- Preceded by: Gunnar Knudsen
- Succeeded by: Christian Michelsen

Member of the Council of State Division
- In office 11 March 1905 – 7 June 1905 Serving with Edvard H. Bull
- Prime Minister: Christian Michelsen
- Preceded by: Birger Kildal; Jacob Schøning
- Succeeded by: Position abolished

Member of the Norwegian Parliament
- In office 1 January 1903 – 31 December 1906
- Constituency: Nordre Trondhjem

Personal details
- Born: 30 November 1850 Fredrikshald, Østfold, Sweden-Norway
- Died: 24 October 1924 (aged 73)
- Party: Liberal

Harald Bothner (30 November 1850 – 24 October 1924) was a Norwegian politician for the Liberal Party, born in Halden. He was a district stipendiary magistrate by profession. From 1878 to 1880 he worked as a solicitor in Sarpsborg, before moving to Halden. Bothner became a District Attorney in Stavanger in 1889, and a judge in Stjør- og Verdal district court in 1896. He entered into national politics in 1903, when he was elected a member of the Norwegian parliament for northern Trondheim for the period 1903–06. Bothner was appointed member of the Council of State Division in Stockholm in 1905, and served as Minister of Auditing later the same year. On 27 November 1905 he was made Minister of Justice in the coalition government of Christian Michelsen, a position he held until the cabinet's dissolution in 1907. After retiring from the government he was County Governor of Sør-Trøndelag until 1921.

Political offices
Preceded by Edvard Hagerup Bull	Minister of Justice and the Police; November 1905–October 1907	Succeeded by Johan Olaf Bredal
Civic offices
Preceded by Lars Otto Roll Grundt	County Governor of Søndre Trondhjem; 1907–1921 (County re-named Sør-Trøndelag in 1919)	Succeeded by Odd Sverressøn Klingenberg
