= Samlingspartiet =

Samlingspartiet may refer to:

- National Coalition Party of Finland - Samlingspartiet, Kokoomus
- Coalition Party (Norway) - Samlingspartiet
- Moderate Party of Sweden - Moderata samlingspartiet
