= Dag Berggrav =

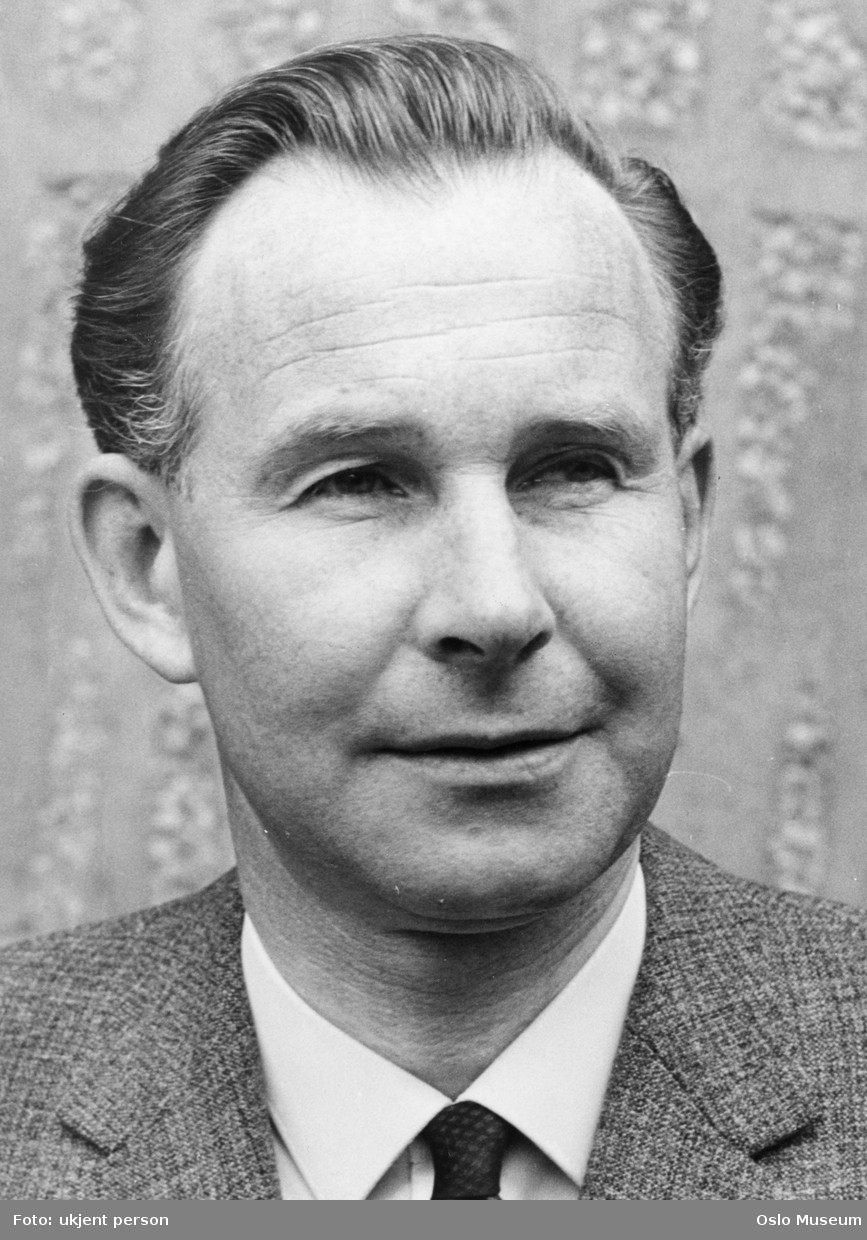
Dag Berggrav (1967)

Dag Berggrav (17 May 1925 – 3 May 2003) was a Norwegian jurist, civil servant and sports administrator. Known mostly for his long tenure at the Norwegian Office of the Prime Minister, he also held important positions in sporting life, including the vice presidency of the International Ski Federation.

== Early and personal life ==
He was born in Oslo as the son of bishop Eivind Berggrav and Kathrine Seip; and grandson of bishop Otto Jensen. He grew up in Tromsø and Oslo, where his father was bishop from 1928 to 1937 and 1937 to 1951 respectively. During the occupation of Norway by Nazi Germany, he was held prisoner at Akershus Fortress from 20 December 1944 to the war's end in 1945.

His father being a bishop, Dag Berggrav was a devout Lutheran as well.

== Civil career ==
In 1950 Dag Berggrav graduated from the University of Oslo with the cand.jur. degree. After studying international law in England for one year, Berggrav was hired as a deputy judge in Oslo. He was then a secretary in the Ministry of Justice and the Police from 1951 to 1962, except for the years 1952 to 1954, when he worked in the Numedal district, first as deputy judge, then as acting district stipendiary magistrate. Having attended the Norwegian National Defence College from 1958 to 1959, in 1960 he was hired in the Norwegian Office of the Prime Minister for the first time, on a one-year deputyship. He was hired on a permanent basis in 1962, and promoted to subdirector in 1966. From 1966 to 1969 he served as acting Secretary to the Council of State. He was promoted to under-secretary of state in 1974, and to permanent under-secretary of state in 1987. By that time the tasks of the Secretary to the Council of State has been transferred to the permanent under-secretary of state in the Office of the Prime Minister. Following his semi-retirement in 1992, Berggrav continued as an advisor for many years. He also chaired the Koordineringsrådet for sivilt beredskap from 1974 to 1992.

== Sports career ==
Berggrav was an active ski jumper in the years 1931 to 1956. From 1964 to 1970 he was the president of the Norwegian Skiing Federation, and from 1965 to 1970 he was a member of the Norwegian Olympic Committee. From 1979 to 1983 he was the vice president of the International Ski Federation. He represented the clubs Frigg and Heming in Oslo.
