= Tor Bertel Løvgren =

Norwegian painter and author

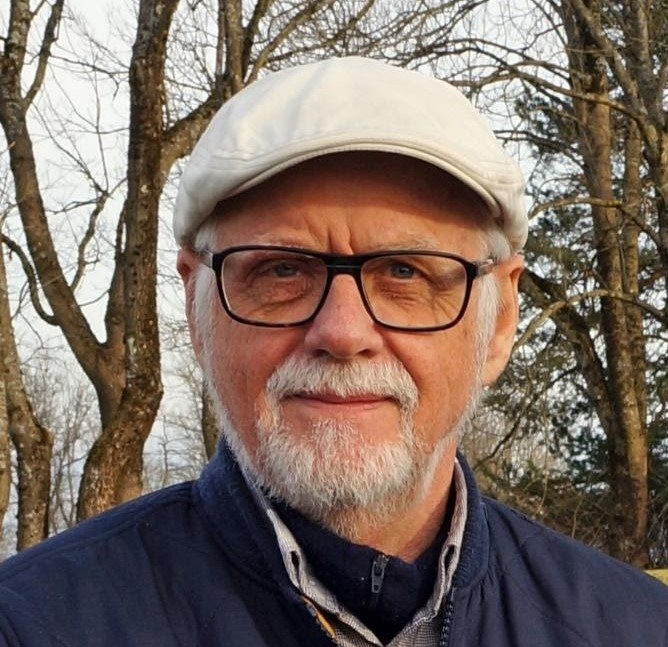
- Born: Larvik, Vestfold, Norway
- Occupations: Painter, writer, musician, publisher
- Notable credits: The Sword Apprentice (Sverddrengen); The Archer (Bueskytteren)

Tor Bertel Løvgren (born 1949) from Larvik, living in Skien, is a retired biochemist, and devotes his time to writing and delving into early medieval European and Nordic history. He is a lifelong partner to Norwegian author and humanitarian worker Kari-Margrete Rensel Løvgren.

== Work ==
Tor Bertel worked as a scientist in polymer chemistry in order to support himself while pursuing painting, writing, drawing and composing folk music. In 2018 he published his most comprehensive work, The Sword Apprentice (Sverddrengen) novel. The second book, 'The Archer'(Bueskytteren), was published in 2020.

He is also a musician (guitar and vocals), who has written numerous songs, one musical and made two albums, 'Sommerens Land' and 'Det Skjelver en Tone'. He is also an accomplished painter and illustrator, with some art exhibitions. He also runs his own publishing company, Serubabel Forlag.
