= Eivind Berggrav =

Norwegian Lutheran bishop

The Right Reverend Eivind Berggrav
- Bishop of Oslo; Primate of the Church of Norway
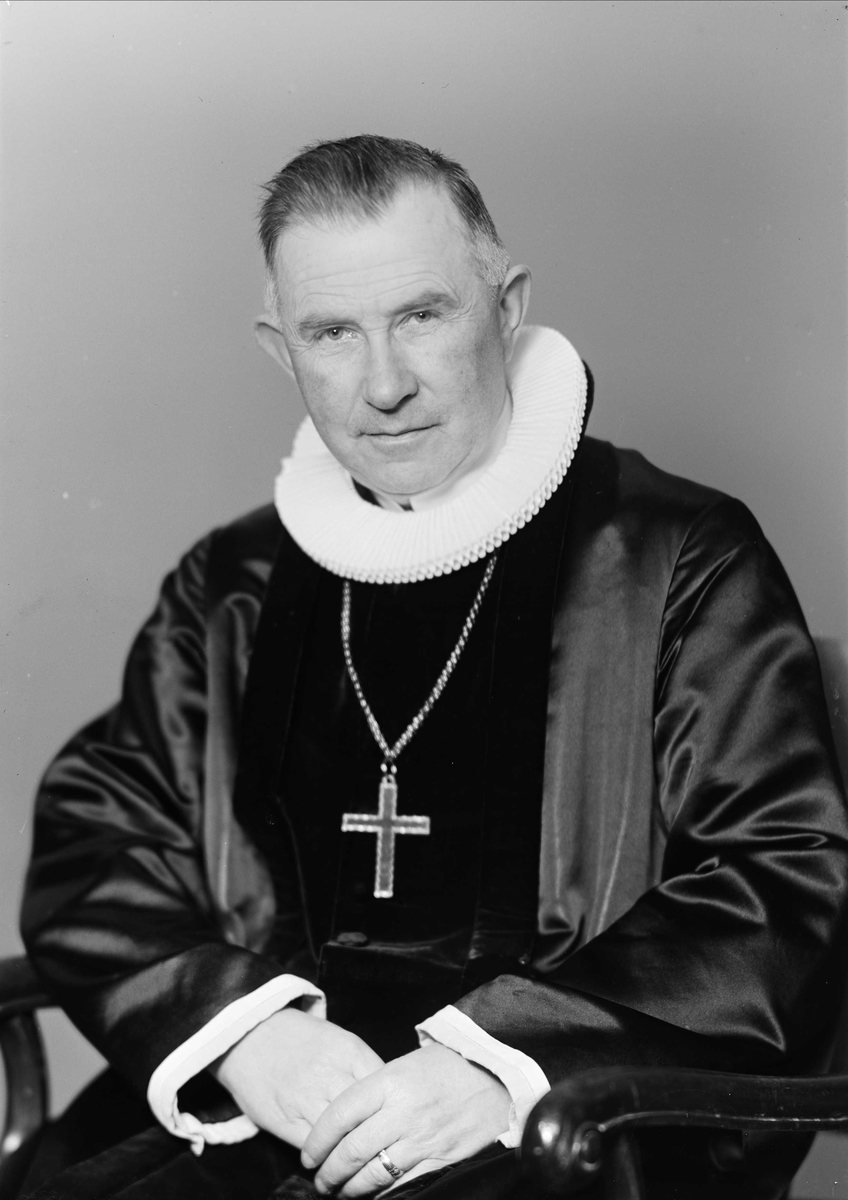
- Eivind Berggrav in 1940
- Church: Church of Norway
- Diocese: Oslo
- In office: 1937–1951
- Predecessor: Johan Lunde
- Successor: Johannes Smemo

Orders
- Ordination: 1908
- Consecration: 1928

Personal details
- Born: 25 October 1884 Stavanger, Norway
- Died: 14 January 1959 (aged 74) Oslo, Norway
- Buried: Cemetery of Our Saviour
- Denomination: Lutheran
- Spouse: Kathrine Seip (died 1949)
- Children: Dag Berggrav
- Education: Cand.theol.; University of Oslo
- Years active: 1908 — 1951

Eivind Josef Berggrav (25 October 1884 – 14 January 1959) was a Norwegian Lutheran bishop. As primate of the Church of Norway (Norwegian: Preses i Bispemøtet i Den norske kirke), Berggrav became known for his central role in the Church of Norway's resistance against the Nazi occupation of Norway during World War II. Berggrav also became an important figure in 20th-century ecumenical movement and served as president of the United Bible Societies.

== Background ==
Berggrav was born Eivind Jensen in Stavanger and raised in Asak in Østfold. His father, Otto Jensen (like his father before him) was an educator and parish priest, who when Eivind was 22 became for a short time Norway's National Minister of Education and Church Affairs in a coalition government before returning to his Skjeberg parish. Rev. Jensen later became dean in the Diocese of Kristiania, and, in the year before his death, bishop of the Diocese of Hamar. His wife, and Eivind's mother, was Marena Christine Pedersen (1846–1924). His sister's daughter was Kari Berggrav, the pioneer press photographer

== Career ==
Eivind studied theology in Oslo at what was then the University of Kristiania beginning in 1903, and continued family tradition by becoming a priest in the Church of Norway. He changed his surname to that of his paternal grandmother's family: to Jensen Berggrav in 1907 and a decade later to simply Berggrav.

Upon graduating from the university in 1908, Jensen Berggrav taught school for a decade (at the Eidsvoll folkehøgskole, Holmestrand offentlige lærerskole and Akershus fylkesskole). He also started writing for the journal, Kirke i Kultur, which Berggrav continued to do intermittently for decades, until his death. During World War I Berggrav filed some stories as a war correspondent for the Morgenbladet, Norway's largest newspaper. Berggrav also became involved with the Østlandsk reisning political party and the Østlandsk ungdomsfylking youth movement with Alf Frydenberg. Both social movements sought to incorporate the language spoken in eastern Norway into the national written language. (See Norwegian language conflict).

Berggrav eventually was called as a parish priest in Hurdal, and he continued to study for his doctorate in theology at the university. In the three years after he received it in 1924, Rev. Berggrav also served as chaplain of Botsfengselet national prison in Oslo. In 1928 Berggrav was selected as bishop for the Diocese of Hålogaland based at Tromsø. He dedicated a number of new chapels as he served the largely rural diocese until 1937. In that year, although younger than many other candidates, Berggrav was selected bishop for the Diocese of Oslo, which although the first among equals, remains the highest position in Norway's national church. The funeral of Queen Maud the following year first brought Berggrav international attention. Except technically during his house arrest during 1942-1945 as discussed below, Berggrav continued to serve as bishop of Oslo and Preses of the Church of Norway until 1951.

== Resistance leader ==
Berggrav achieved international renown for leading the Church of Norway's resistance to the Nazi occupation of Norway during World War II, even though he was under isolated house arrest during most of the war.

In the years immediately before the war, Bergrrav worked with then Crown Prince Olav and others to try to mediate between Germany and England. Shocked by the German invasion of Norway on 9 April 1940, with its attempted capture of King Haakon VII, Berggrav initially appealed to Norwegian Christians to "refrain from any interference" and to refuse to "mix themselves up in the war by sabotage or in any other way." After King Haakon was forced to leave for England after 62 days of fighting, with his king's approval, Berggrav became the leader of the Administrative Council which tried to govern his occupied homeland. However, it became increasingly clear that the occupying Nazi powers would not honor their promises to allow Norwegians freedom of religion nor preserve their structures of government. On 25 September, the Nazis dissolved the Administrative Council, and instead backed a new government under Vidkun Quisling, a Norwegian priest's son who had a military career before becoming a Nazi sympathiser (and whom King Haakon refused to appoint as prime minister after the 1940 Nazi invasion).

A month later Berggrav led his six fellow bishops of the Church of Norway, with ten leaders of other denominations, to form the Christian Council for Joint Deliberation. When the Nazis ordered the Church of Norway to alter its liturgical practices, Bishop Berggrav refused to comply. Matters grew even more serious in January 1942 when the Nazis wound down their occupation government and allowed Quisling (head of a party with only 1% popular support) to try again. On 1 February 1942, a group of Quisling sympathizers invaded Nidaros Cathedral and by the end of the day refused the Cathedral's Dean Kjellbu entry to conduct services. Thousands of Norwegians gathered outside to sing "A Mighty Fortress Is Our God", and the following day all seven Norwegian bishops resigned.

Shortly after Easter, 1942, Berggrav was arrested, and Quisling tried to get him indicted, which provoked further public uproar. Along with four other members of the Christian Council, Berggrav was initially imprisoned in the Bredtvet concentration camp. Berggrav was saved from execution by Theodor Steltzer and Helmuth von Moltke, members of the Kreisau Circle and Schwarze Kapelle. Instead, the bishop was placed in solitary confinement at an isolated location in the forests north of Oslo, allowed to see no one but his guards.

After Berggrav's arrest, the confrontation between church and state escalated. In the spring of 1942 the bishops gave up their state offices, and a large majority of the pastors of the Church of Norway resigned their posts as state civil servants rather than accept NS control of church life; many teachers similarly refused to implement the new school policy and youth organisation. Because clergy were also civil servants, these collective resignations had both practical and symbolic significance and are often seen as a turning point in the church struggle (kirkekampen) during the occupation.

Some accounts relate that, with the tacit cooperation of his guards, Berggrav was on occasion able to leave his place of confinement in Asker to meet contacts in the Norwegian resistance, sometimes in disguise. In December 1944, Time featured Berggrav on its cover in connection with his role in the Norwegian church resistance.

== Author and publisher ==
Berggrav wrote many books, all in the Norwegian language, but some translated into English: The Norwegian Church in Its International Setting, Man and State, and With God in the Darkness, and Other Papers Illustrating the Norwegian Church Conflict. Berggrav founded an association focused on Norway's local history, Romerike Historielag, in 1920, and continued to contribute pieces long after he relinquished the helm upon becoming bishop. Berggrav also led the Norwegian Bible Society (Det Norske Bibelselskap) from 1938 to 1955, even after his retirement as Norway's primate.

== Personal life ==
Berggrav married Kathrine Seip (1883–1949), the daughter of pastor Jens Laurits Arup Seip (1852–1913). They remained married until her death in 1949. Their son Dag Berggrav became an important civil servant and sports administrator. Berggrav died in Oslo and was buried in Vår Frelsers Gravlund with a simple slab gravemarker.

== Honors and legacy ==
- After World War II ended, Berggrav received Norway's highest medal, the Order of St. Olav.
- President Harry S Truman awarded Bishop Berggrav the Medal of Freedom.
- The Calendar of Saints of the Evangelical Lutheran Church in America remembers Berggrav on 14 January.
- In a 2005 poll for Norwegian of the Century (Store Norske) celebrating a century of Norwegian independence, Bishop Berggrav polled 19th (the winner being King Olav V).

== Selected works ==
- — (1937). Spenningens Land [Land of Tension] (in Norwegian).
- — (1945). Kirkens ordning i Norge [Church Order in Norway] (in Norwegian).
- — (1947). Tider Og Tekster [Times and Texts] (in Norwegian).
- — (1953). Es Sehnen sich die Kirchen [The churches yearn] (in German).
- — (1955). Marie Treschow: En Livsskisse [Marie Treschow: A Life Sketch] (in Norwegian).
- — (1960). Forgjeves for Fred. Vinteren 1939-40. Forsok Og Samtaler I Norden, Berlin Og London [In vain for Fred. Winter 1939-40. Attempts And Calls in the Nordic region, Berlin, and London] (in Norwegian).

== Other sources ==
- Godal, Odd Eivind Berggrav: Leader of Christian Resistance (SCM Press. 1949)
- Johnson, Alex and Harriet L. Overholt Johnson . Kjell Jordheim, translator. Eivind Berggrav, God's Man of Suspense (Augsburg Publishing House, 1960)
- Robertson, Edwin Hanton Bishop of the Resistance: A Life of Eivind Berggrav, Bishop of Oslo, Norway ( Concordia Publishing House, 2001)
- Molland, Einar Fra Hans Nielsen Hauge til Eivind Berggrav. Hovedlinjer i Norges kirkehistorie i det 19. og 20. århundre ( Oslo: Gyldendal, 1968)

Church of Norway titles
Preceded by Johan Støren	Bishop of Hålogaland; 1928–1937	Succeeded by Sigurd Johan Normann
Preceded by Johan Lunde	Bishop of Oslo; 1937–1951	Succeeded by Johannes Smemo
Preceded by Johan Lunde	Preses of the Church of Norway; 1937–1951	Succeeded by Johannes Smemo
