= Johan Olaf Bredal =

Norwegian politician (1862–1948)

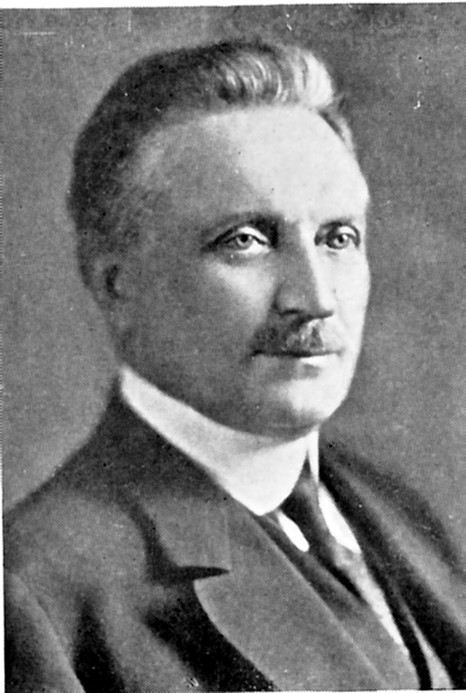

Minister of Justice
- In office 23 October 1907 – 19 March 1908
- Prime Minister: Jørgen Løvland
- Preceded by: Harald Bothner
- Succeeded by: Johan Castberg

Member of the Norwegian Parliament
- In office 1 January 1913 – 31 December 1915
- Constituency: Aker Municipality

Personal details
- Born: Johan Olaf Bredal; 10 March 1852 Larvik, Vestfold, United Kingdoms of Sweden and Norway
- Died: 26 April 1948 (aged 96)
- Party: Free-minded Liberal
- Spouse: Ingeborg Olsen (m. 1890)

Johan Olaf Bredal (10 March 1862 – 26 April 1948) was a Norwegian barrister and politician.

Johan Olaf Bredal was born in Larvik, Norway. From 1886–1887, he was an attorney in Drammen. He was a prosecutor in Sandefjord 1887-1894 and became a Supreme Court Attorney in 1891. He was the chairman of the Norwegian Law and Counselors Association 1903–1904. He served as Minister of Justice in the short-lived cabinet of Jørgen Løvland from October 1907 to March 1908.

Political offices
Preceded by Harald Bothner	Minister of Justice and the Police; October 1907–March 1908	Succeeded by Johan Castberg
