= Johan Lunde =

Norwegian theologian and Bishop

The Right Reverend John Peter Lunde
- Bishop of Oslo
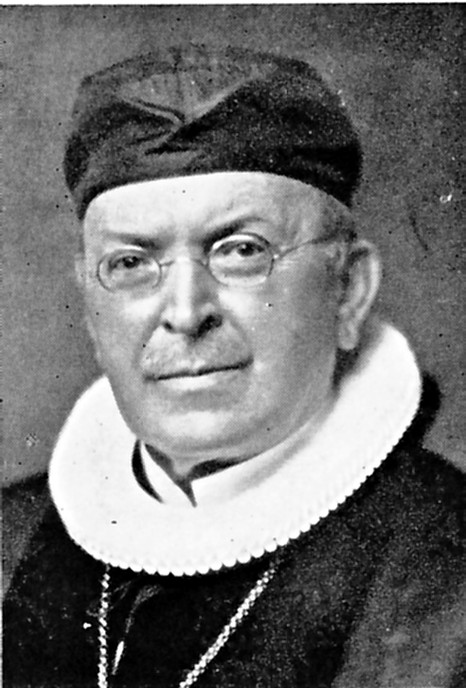
- Church: Church of Norway
- In office: 1922–1937
- Predecessor: Jens Frølich Tandberg
- Successor: Eivind Berggrav

Personal details
- Born: 25 December 1866 Lillehammer, Norway
- Died: 12 February 1938 (aged 71) Oslo, Norway
- Denomination: Christian
- Education: Cand.theol.
- Alma mater: University of Oslo

Johan Peter Lunde (25 December 1866 – 12 February 1938) was a Norwegian theologian and Bishop of the Diocese of Oslo.

== Biography ==
Lunde was born at Lillehammer, Norway. He was the son of Knud Truls Wiel Lunde (1827–1915) and Mariane Sophie Brun (1835–1911). Lunde graduated artium in 1883. He studied theology at the University of Kristiania and became cand.theol. in 1890. He first worked as a teacher before he was ordained at the Kristiansand Cathedral in 1897. In 1900, Lunde became a parish priest in Bygland Municipality. In 1906, Lunde became the resident chapel and in 1910 parish priest at St. Johannes Church in Stavanger. In 1920 he moved to Kristiania (now Oslo) and became a parish priest at Gamlebyen. From 1922 until 1937, Lunde was Bishop of the Diocese of Oslo.

Due to strong commitment to Sunday school and to children's religious education, Lunde became known as the Children's Bishop. His projects included youth work across Norway. Among other roles, he was President of the World Sunday School Council. As a bishop, he hosted an international Sunday School Congress at Oslo in 1936.

== Personal life ==
In 1894, he married Helga Tomine Johannessen (1871–1895). He was only married for a short time before his wife died. He lived alone for the rest of his life. Bishop Lunde was named Commander of the 1st Class of the Order of St. Olav in 1929 and he was Commander of the Swedish Nordstjärneorden.

== Selected works ==
- Han utgav ellers Taler og foredrag (1929)
- Jesus fra Nasaret (1930)
- Hans Barneprekener (1930)
- Nye barneprekener (1932)

Church of Norway titles
Preceded by Jens Frølich Tandberg	Lutheran Bishop of Christiania/Oslo; 1922–1937	Succeeded by Eivind Berggrav
