= Sivert Dyrland =

Norwegian farmer and politician (1848–1947)

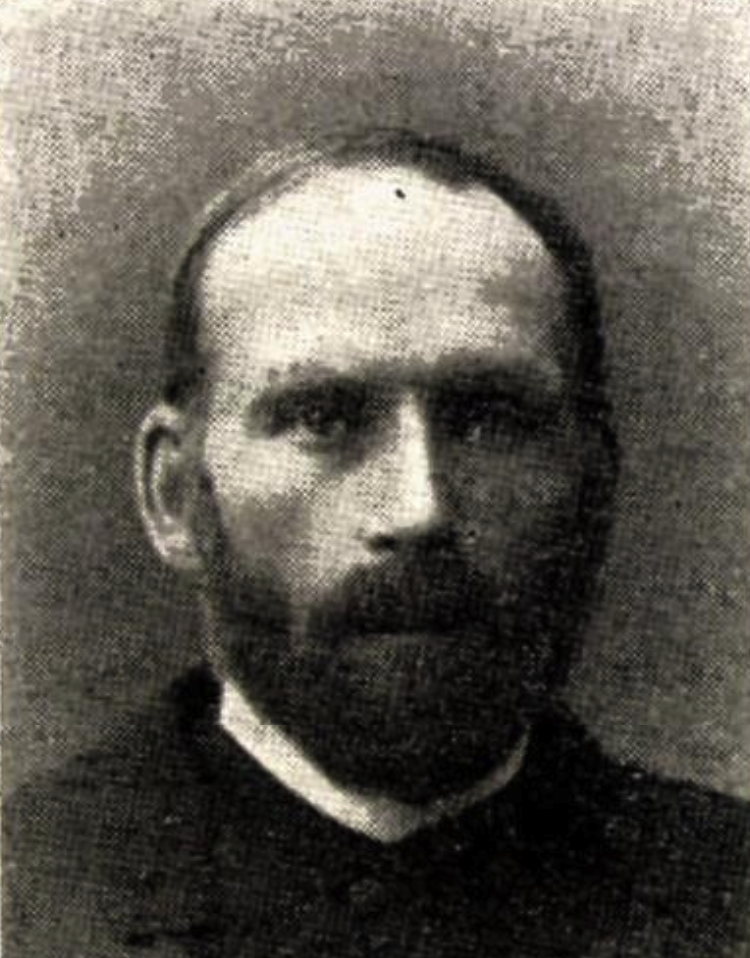
- Dyrland in 1906

Member of the Storting
- In office 1906–1912
- Constituency: Karmsund

Deputy Member of the Storting
- In office 1903–1906
- Constituency: Stavanger amt

Personal details
- Born: Sivert Eriksen Dyrland; 5 June 1848 Skudenes Municipality, Stavanger amt, Norway
- Died: 16 February 1947 (aged 98) Skudenes Municipality, Rogaland, Norway
- Party: Conservative, Coalition
- Occupation: Farmer, politician

Sivert Eriksen Dyrland (5 June 1848 – 16 February 1947) was a Norwegian farmer and politician from Skudenes Municipality in Stavanger amt. Dyrland represented the constituency of Karmsund in the Norwegian Parliament for the Coalition Party from 1906 to 1909 and later for the Conservative Party from 1910 to 1912.

Dyrland was the son of Erik Olsen Dyrland, a tenant farmer in Skudenes Municipality. In his younger years, he worked as a fisherman, both in Nordlandenes amt and in the North Sea mackerel fishery. In 1878, he purchased half of his father's farm at Dyrland, and in 1883 he also acquired half of his father-in-law's farm at the same location.

From 1878, Dyrland served as the parish priest's lay assistant, and from 1890 he also served as a commissioner responsible for conducting official examinations of scenes of sudden or suspicious deaths. He was a member of the municipal council for many years and served on the board of the joint association of the Inner Mission societies in the Karmsund deanery from 1886 to 1905.

== Parliamentary committees ==
- 1906–1909: Member of Standing Committee on Business and Industry No. 2
- 1910–1912: Member of the Church Committee and the Lagting.
