= Hans Nilsen Hauge =

Norwegian politician (1853–1931)

Member of the Norwegian Parliament
- In office 1 January 1895 – 31 December 1900
- Constituency: Vestfold

Minister of Education and Church Affairs
- In office 22 October 1903 – 11 March 1905
- Prime Minister: Francis Hagerup
- Preceded by: Vilhelm Wexelsen
- Succeeded by: Christopher Knudsen

Personal details
- Born: 3 November 1853 Nordre Undal Municipality, Lister og Mandal, Sweden-Norway
- Died: 17 December 1931 (aged 78) Botne Municipality, Vestfold, Norway
- Party: Conservative
- Profession: Priest

Hans Nilsen Hauge (3 November 1853 – 17 December 1931) was a Norwegian priest and politician for Norway's Conservative Party. He was Minister of Education and Church Affairs from 1903 to 1905.

Knudsen was born in Nordre Undal Municipality, and was the grandson of the revivalist lay preacher Hans Nielsen Hauge and son of priest Andreas Hauge. He enrolled as a student in 1871 and graduated as cand.theol. in 1877. He was acting vicar in Brevik from January to July 1879, and then worked in Skien until 1887, except for the years 1881 to 1886 when he was a sailors' padre in North Shields. In 1887 he became vicar in Brevik on a permanent basis. He was elected to the Norwegian Parliament from the city in 1895 and 1898. In 1900 he became vicar in Eidanger.

On 22 October 1903, when the second cabinet Hagerup assumed office, Hauge was appointed Norwegian Minister of Education and Church Affairs. The cabinet resigned on 10 March 1905 as a part of the build-up for the dissolution of the union between Norway and Sweden; Hauge did not retain the job. He did not return to Eidanger either, instead he became vicar in Skien. He changed job to dean in 1918, and retired in 1924.

Hauge was appointed a Knight of the Royal Norwegian Order of St. Olav and a Commander of the Order of the Dannebrog.

Political offices
Preceded by Vilhelm Andreas Wexelsen	Norwegian Minister of Education and Church Affairs; 1903–1905	Succeeded by Christopher Knudsen
