= Knud Christian Knudsen =

Norwegian politician

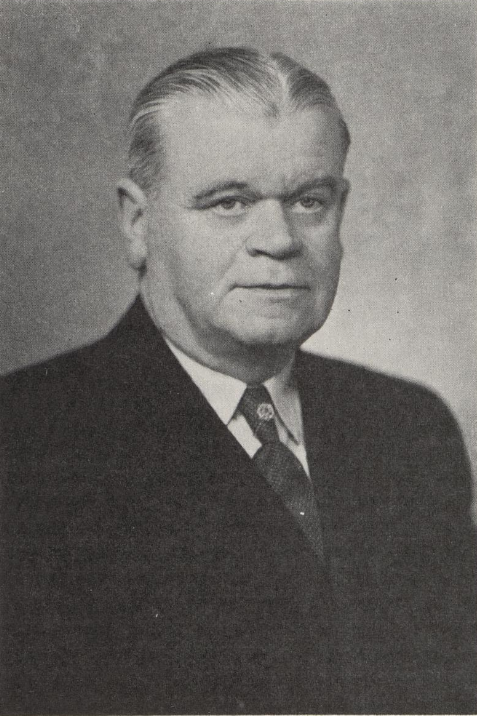
- Born: 18 January 1887; Drammen, Norway
- Died: 24 May 1969 (aged 82)
- Occupations: Merchant and politician

Knud Christian Knudsen (18 January 1887 – 24 May 1969) was a Norwegian merchant and politician for the Conservative Party.

He was born in Drammen; the son of wholesaler August Martinius Knudsen (1858–1922) and Anne Margrethe Høstad (1858–1905). He was a nephew of vicar and politician Christoffer Knudsen.

He finished Kristiania Commerce School in 1906 and was hired in a wholesaling company in Hamburg in the same year. From 1908 he worked in his father's company Aug. M. Knudsen & Søn from 1908. It became a public company in 1916, and Knudsen was the manager and majority owner.

He was a member of Drammen city council from 1928 to 1945, with tenures as deputy mayor from 1931 to 1934 and in 1945. He was elected to the Parliament of Norway in 1936, representing the Market towns of Buskerud county. He served through one term, which was interrupted by the occupation of Norway by Nazi Germany. Near the end of the occupation, he was incarcerated in Grini concentration camp from January 1945 until end of World War II.

He chaired Drammens Sparebank from 1942 and Drammen Port Authority from 1946 (board member since 1932), was a board member of Norges Colonialgrossisters Forbund from 1925 to 1931 and 1945 to 1950, Norges Handelsstands Forbund from 1945 to 1955, and Forsikringsselskapet Norge to 1956, and supervisory council member of Drammens og Oplands Privatbank. He was a member of Statens kornråd from 1931 to 1950 and the Norwegian branch of the International Chamber of Commerce, and supervisory committee member of the Drammen Line and Randsfjord Line. He died in May 1969.
