= Coalition Party (Norway) =

Coalition Party Samlingspartiet
- Founded: 1903
- Dissolved: 1909
- Ideology: National unity Unionism (until 1905); Conservatism; Liberalism
- Political position: Centre to centre-right

The Coalition Party (Norwegian: Samlingspartiet) was a Norwegian political coalition drawn from the Conservative Party, the Moderate Liberal Party and independent Liberals. Its main issues were opposition to the Liberal Party's political union radicalism, as well as to the rising growth of social democracy. Originally formed to pursue a more careful negotiating line towards Sweden, the party turned around and took part in Michelsen's Cabinet, which carried through the dissolution of the union between Norway and Sweden in 1905. The coalition's leading members included Christian Michelsen himself, Wollert Konow (SB) and Bjørnstjerne Bjørnson.

== History ==
The Coalition Party went to the polls in the 1903 election based on its promises to negotiate with Sweden concerning Norwegian rights to consulates, in opposition to the radical actionist line of the Liberal Party. In addition to a revolutionary state, the party feared the formation of a republic, as well as potential foreign intervention. Optimism about the success of these negotiations was high, and the Coalition Party and the Conservatives won 63 seats in the Norwegian Parliament, against the Liberals' 49. On 22 October 1903 Hagerup's Second Cabinet was formed, led by Francis Hagerup from the Coalition Party. In early 1905 the party split with the majority voting in favor of a more actionist line in opposition to Hagerup, causing his government to be replaced by a broad coalition government under Christian Michelsen, in which the Liberal Party also participated. This government carried through the dissolution of the union between Norway and Sweden in 1905.

After the independence of Norway, there were attempts to create a union of all non-socialist parties. But after the union issue had been resolved, internal unity disintegrated, and disputes that had been previously suppressed blossomed. The Liberal Party declined to be absorbed into the party. The 1906 parliamentary election became a contest between the Liberals and the Coalition Party. Exact figures for the election result are hard to compile, as a new election system was introduced, with single member constituencies and a plurality voting system, where many representatives were elected as independents and only joined a parliamentary faction after the election. Statistics Norway estimates that candidates affiliated with Samlingspartiet won 32.8% of the vote, and the Liberal Party 49.9%. 75 of the 123 elected MPs joined the Liberal parliamentary group. Several of these, however, had been elected as Coalition Party candidates.

Michelsen's cabinet remained in office, as the Liberal parliamentary faction was not cohesive enough to challenge it, until Michelsen resigned due to ill health in October 1907. By this time, the idea of one, united, non-socialist party was abandoned by the Conservatives, as it was clear that the Liberal Party would not be joining it. The coalition was effectively defunct by 1909, although some former Liberals under influence of Michelsen formed the Free-minded Liberal Party in close cooperation with the Conservatives, and the name "Coalition Party" remained in use by some local branches of the Conservative Party until the 1930s.
