= Jacob Marius Schøning =

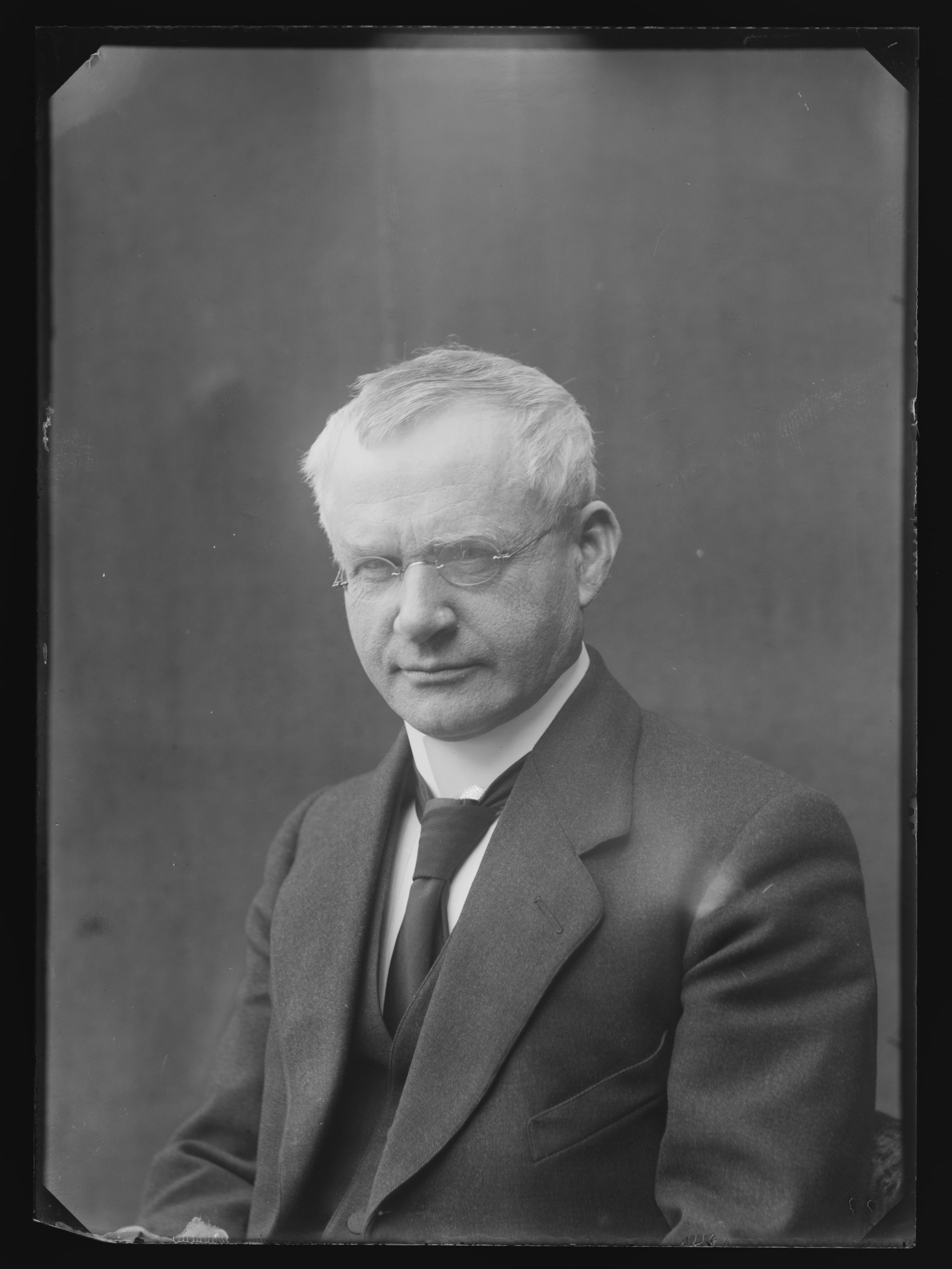
Jacob Marius Schøning.

Jacob Marius Schøning (25 February 1856 – 12 November 1934) was the Norwegian Minister of Trade 1903–1904, and a member of the Council of State Division in Stockholm 1904–1905. In 1884 he was a co-founder of the Norwegian Association for Women's Rights.
