= Halfdan Lehmann =

Norwegian politician

Halfdan Lehmann (1825-1908) was a Norwegian politician in the late 19th and early 20th century. He served as state secretary in Kristiania during 1879–1906. He also held multiple temporary positions including Acting Minister of Education and Church Affairs in 1881 and 1884, Acting Minister of the Navy and Postal Affairs in 1884.
