= Christian Michelsen =

1st Prime Minister of independent Norway

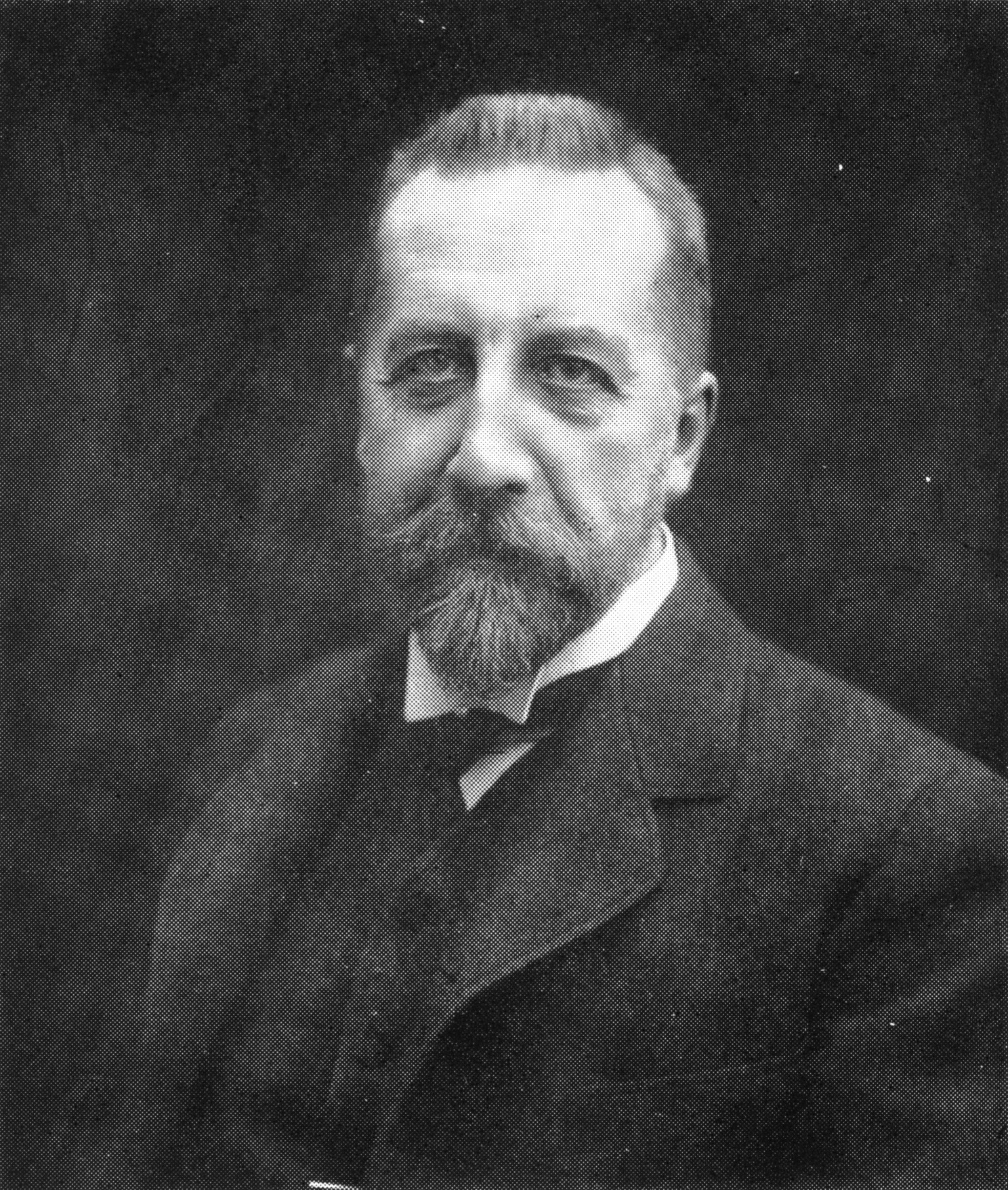
- Christian Michelsen by the early 20th century

Prime Minister of Norway
- In office 11 March 1905 – 23 October 1907
- Monarchs: Oscar II; Haakon VII
- Preceded by: Francis Hagerup
- Succeeded by: Jørgen Løvland

Acting Minister of Defence
- In office 25 May 1907 – 23 October 1907
- Prime Minister: Himself
- Preceded by: Wilhelm Olssøn
- Succeeded by: Karl F. Griffin Dawes

Minister of Finance
- In office 31 October 1905 – 27 November 1905
- Prime Minister: Himself
- Preceded by: Gunnar Knudsen
- Succeeded by: Edvard H. Bull
- In office 1 September 1904 – 11 March 1905
- Prime Minister: Francis Hagerup
- Preceded by: Birger Kildal
- Succeeded by: Gunnar Knudsen

Minister of Justice
- In office 11 March 1905 – 7 June 1905
- Prime Minister: Himself
- Preceded by: Francis Hagerup
- Succeeded by: Edvard H. Bull

Minister of Auditing
- In office 27 November 1905 – 23 October 1907
- Prime Minister: Himself
- Preceded by: Harald Bothner
- Succeeded by: Sven Aarrestad

Personal details
- Born: Peter Christian Hersleb Kjerschow Michelsen; 15 March 1857 Bergen, Hordaland, Norway
- Died: 29 June 1925 (aged 68) Fana, Hordaland, Norway
- Party: Liberal (1884–1903); Coalition (1903–09); Free-minded Liberal (1909–25)
- Other political affiliations: Fatherland League (1925)
- Spouse: Johanne Benedicte Wallendahl
- Children: Benny; Einar

Peter Christian Hersleb Kjerschow Michelsen (15 March 1857– 29 June 1925), better known as Christian Michelsen, was a Norwegian shipping magnate and statesman. He was the first prime minister of independent Norway from 1905 to 1907. Michelsen is most known for his central role in the dissolution of the union between Norway and Sweden in 1905, and was one of Norway's most influential politicians of his time.

== Background ==
Born in Bergen, he was named after his grandfather, bishop Peder Christian Hersleb Kjerschow. He was the eldest of five siblings born into a merchant family. Through his mother, Michelsen was a scion of the prominent Collett family. He attended the Bergen Cathedral School. He studied law at The Royal Frederick University and went on to become a lawyer. He later established the shipping company, Chr. Michelsen & Co., which became one of the largest in Norway.

== Political career ==
He became a member of the Norwegian Parliament (Storting) in 1891, representing the Liberal Party of Norway. He considered himself mostly above petty party strifes, and one of his major aims was to create a coalition of parties reaching from the Conservative Party to the Liberal Party, which he called the Coalition Party. He served as Finance Minister in Hagerup's Second Cabinet, and was one of the strongest proponents of a more firm policy towards the union between Sweden and Norway. In March 1905, Michelsen replaced Francis Hagerup as Prime Minister, and immediately became the leader of the movement towards dissolution of the union (Unionsoppløsningen i 1905).

The formal basis for the dissolution was King Oscar II's refusal to accept the Norwegian consular laws (Konsulatsaken). The Swedish government had for several years insisted that laws governing foreign affairs had to be a part of the union agreement, and as such, consular laws could not be passed by the Norwegian Storting without consent of the Swedish Parliament (Riksdag). The Swedes were willing to accept the Norwegian urge for separate consular affairs, but they demanded that Norway accept the precedent under which the union had operated for 90 years, namely that the Foreign Minister be Swedish. This, the Norwegians felt, acknowledged Sweden as having the upper hand in the Union. While this supremacy existed in reality, Norwegians were unwilling to accept the unequal relationship on a formal, legal basis.

On 27 May 1905 King Oscar refused to sign the bill, and in response the Norwegian cabinet ministers resigned collectively. The king took no further action, probably aware that a dissolution of the Union was imminent, and the Swedish politicians did nothing, probably believing that this was another Norwegian political retreat. On 7 June, the Norwegian Storting declared that because the King had been unable to form a new government in Norway after Michelsen's resignation, he had lost the capacity to rule and hence ceased to be king of Norway. This strategic move gave the dissolution a somewhat legal basis, and was primarily the work of Christian Michelsen. He knew that the Norwegian people, after months of well-directed information in a unanimous press, was united in a way that is extremely rare in a democracy. In the referendum that proved the Norwegian will to dissolve the union, retention of the union garnered a mere 184 votes nationwide, which represented only one vote out of every 2000 cast.

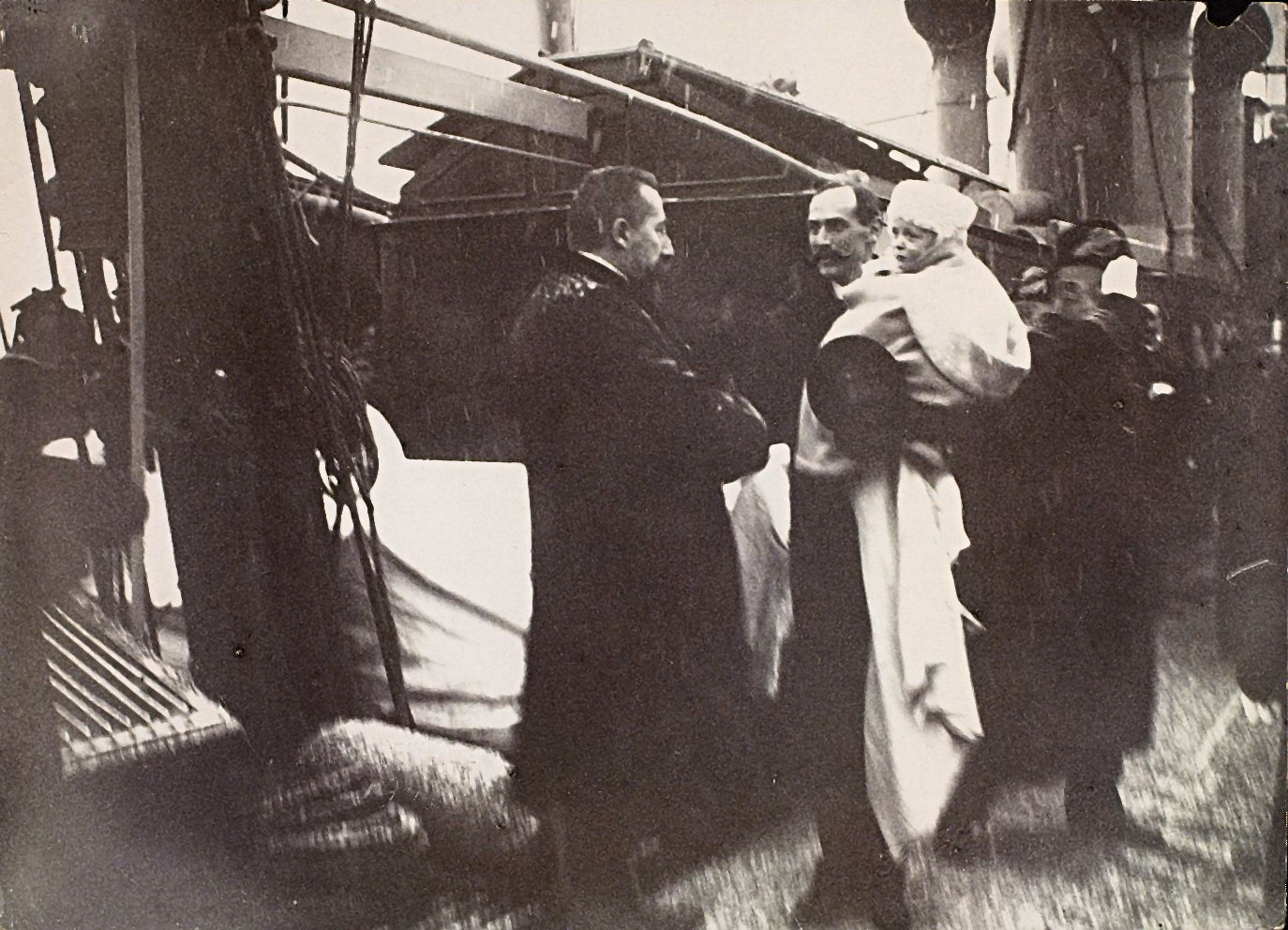
Michelsen greets King Haakon and prince Olav as they arrive in Norway for the first time in 1905

Michelsen, though a believer in a democratic republic in Norway, accepted that a democratic monarchy would have the greatest chances to be accepted abroad and among a majority of Norwegians. Prince Carl of Denmark became King Haakon VII of Norway after a new referendum had given the monarchy proponents approximately 79% of the votes cast.

In 1906 Michelsen won the election on an "above-the-parties" ticket, which quickly alienated the leading Liberals from him. In 1907 he resigned, having tired of petty squabbles among the political leaders, and accepting that his political views had been defeated. Jørgen Løvland carried on Michelsen's work, but lacked the will to force the coalition to stand united, and in 1908 the coalition broke down. In social policy, Michelsen's time as prime minister saw the passage of the 1906 Law on Central and Local Government Contributions to Unemployment Funds, which introduced voluntary insurance.

In 1925, he, along with the polar explorer Fridtjof Nansen and the industrialist Joakim Lehmkuhl, founded the Fatherland League.

== Personal life ==
He was married in 1881 to Johanne Benedicte Wallendahl (1861–1910). In 1905, he was awarded the Grand Cross of The Royal Norwegian Order of St. Olav and in 1907 he received the Collar as well.

=== Gamlehaugen ===
In the year 1899, Michelsen began the construction of the Gamlehaugen mansion, which was completed in 1900. The estate today functions as a residence of the Norwegian royal family and is open to the public.

== Chr. Michelsen Institute ==
Michelsen bequeathed most of his estate to a fund which made possible the establishment and operation of Chr. Michelsen Institute for Science and Intellectual freedom. In recent times, the Chr. Michelsen Institute (CMI) was established as an independent centre for research on international development and policy. Founded in Bergen in 1930, CMI conducts both applied and theoretical research, and has a multidisciplinary profile anchored in four thematic research groups, namely human rights, democracy and development, peace, conflict and the state, poverty reduction and public sector reform.

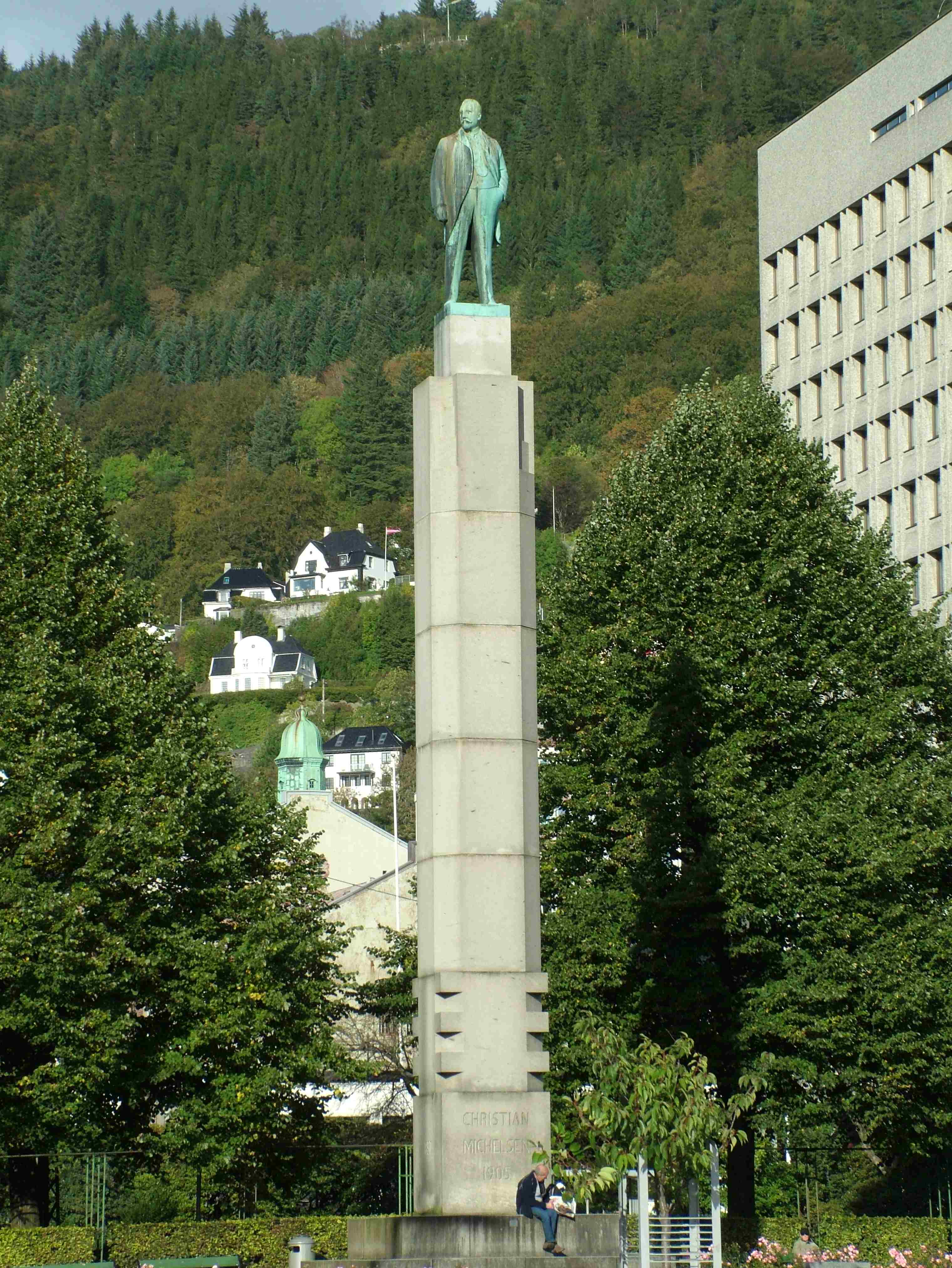
Memorial to Christian Michelsen. Bergen, Norway

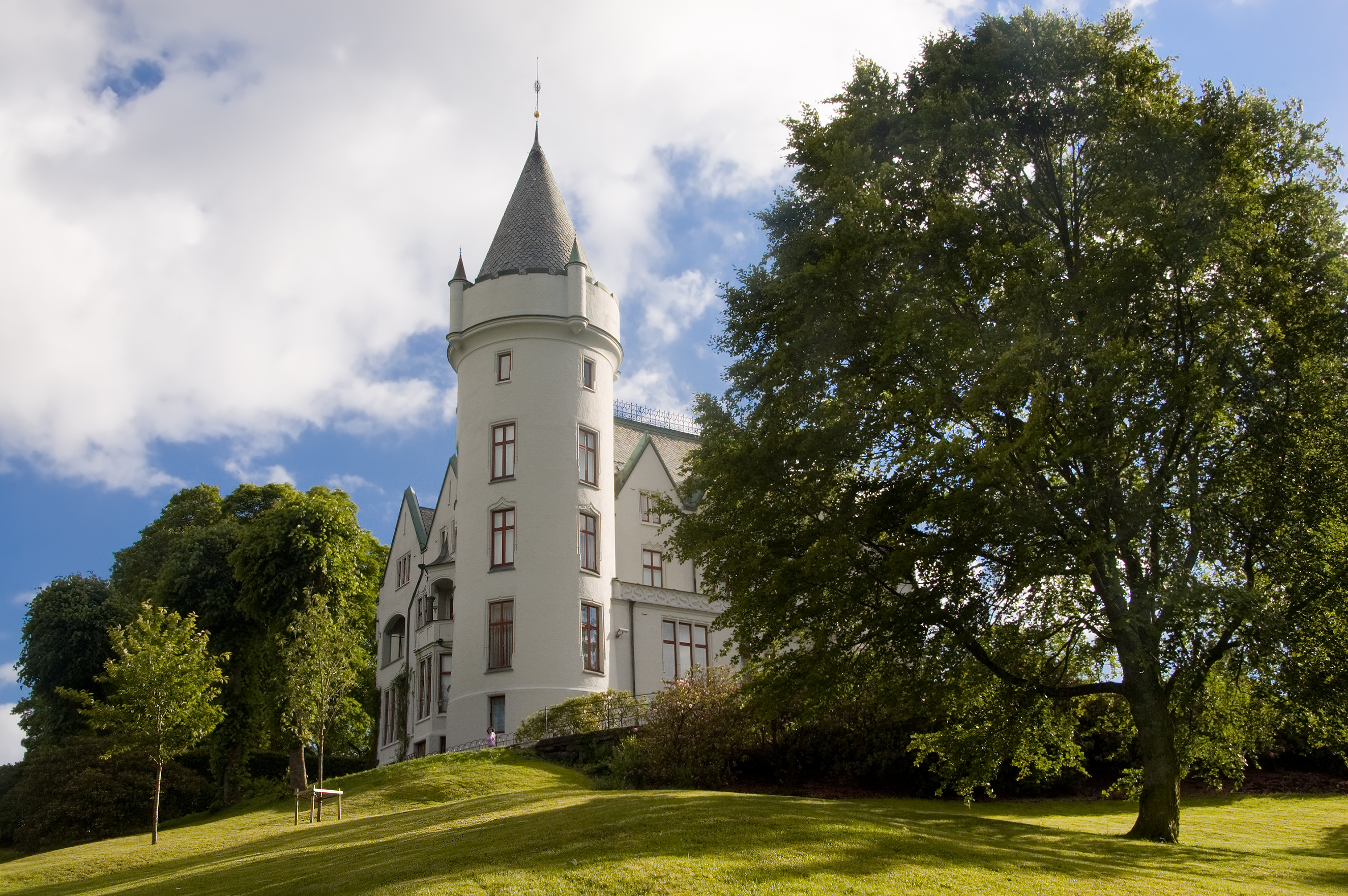
Gamlehaugen, Michelsen's estate outside of Bergen

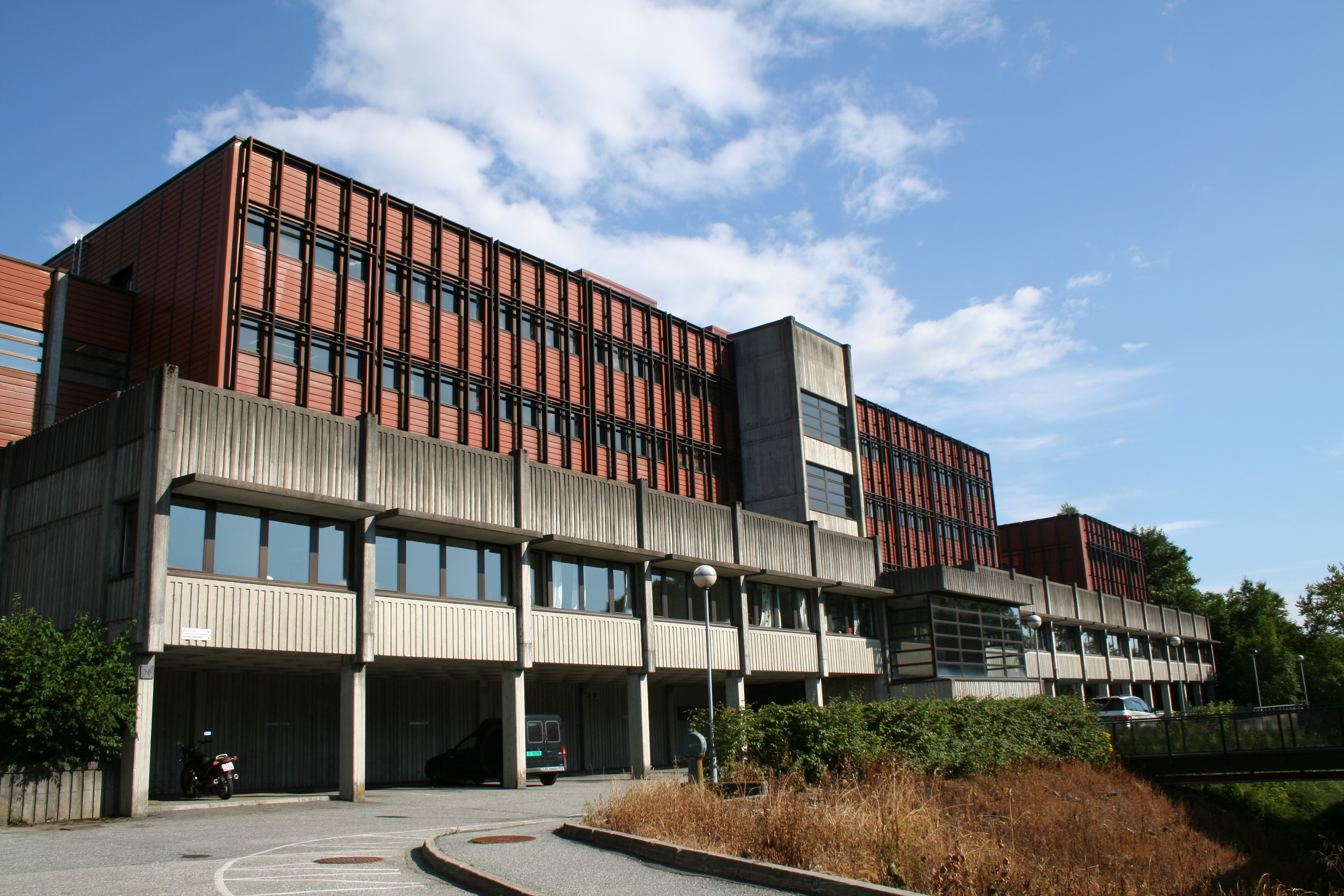
The Chr. Michelsen Institute in Bergen

== See also ==
- Michelsen's Cabinet

Political offices
Preceded by Francis Hagerup (in Christiania) and Jørgen Løvland (in Stockholm)	Prime Minister of Norway; 1905–1907	Succeeded by Jørgen Løvland
