= Austrheim =

Austrheim may refer to:

== Places ==
- Austrheim Municipality, a municipality in Vestland county, Norway
- Austrheim (village), a village within Austrheim Municipality in Vestland county, Norway
- Austrheim Church, a church and parish within Austrheim Municipality in Vestland county, Norway

== People ==
- John Austrheim (1912–1995), a Norwegian politician and farmer

== Other ==
- Austrheim IL, a sports club based in Austrheim Municipality in Vestland county, Norway

== See also ==
- Austreim, a village in Høyanger Municipality in Vestland county, Norway
