= Diderik Hegermann Rye =

Norwegian civil servant

Diderik Hegermann Rye (18 May 1832 – 1914) was a Norwegian civil servant.

He was born in Bø i Telemark as a son of lieutenant colonel Johan Mathias Rye and Kristiane Elisabeth Gasmann. He was a nephew of Olaf Rye and Johan Henrik Rye, and brother of Niels Mathias Rye. In 1865 he married naval captain's daughter Kathinka Sofie Diriks (1841–1899).

He graduated from the Norwegian Naval Academy as an officer in 1858, and after mastering vessels for the postal service and supervising fisheries he was hired as an assistant in the Norwegian Coastal Navigation Administration in 1866. He was the director of the agency from 1882 to 1909.

He chaired the Norwegian Society for Sea Rescue, took part in parliamentary law commissions and was an honorary member of the Polytechnic Society and the Association International de la Marine. He was decorated as a Commander of the Order of St. Olav and the Order of Vasa, and a Knight of the Order of the Polar Star and the Order of the Dannebrog. He died in 1914.
