= Egil Helle =

Norwegian newspaper editor (1923–2006)

Egil Helle (28 April 1923 – 2006) was a Norwegian newspaper editor, information worker and biographer.

He was born in Bergen. He started his journalist career in 1942, during the occupation of Norway by Nazi Germany, in the illegal press. The name of his illegal newspaper changed several times, from Ukenytt via Norges Demring to Fram. He had to flee to Sweden towards the end of World War II. After the war he worked as a journalist in Bergens Arbeiderblad from 1945 to 1952 and in Arbeiderbladet from 1952 to 1961. He was then the editor-in-chief of Bergens Arbeiderblad from 1961 to 1964, before working on the editor's board of Arbeiderbladet from 1964 to 1975. He was the press spokesman in the Ministry of Foreign Affairs from 1975 to 1978, and information director in the Ministry of Petroleum and Energy from 1978 to 1991. He was the first to hold this post in the Ministry of Petroleum and Energy, and saw seven government ministers come and go during his time.

Helle was a prolific non-fiction writer. He authored biographies of Oscar Torp (1982), Einar Gerhardsen (1987), Christian Holtermann Knudsen (1988), Nils Langhelle (1991) and Kyrre Grepp (1995). In 1984, he wrote a Norwegian petroleum history, and he has also written books about the Folketeatret building and Biblioteksentralen.

Helle was married, and lived in Oslo. He died in April 2006.

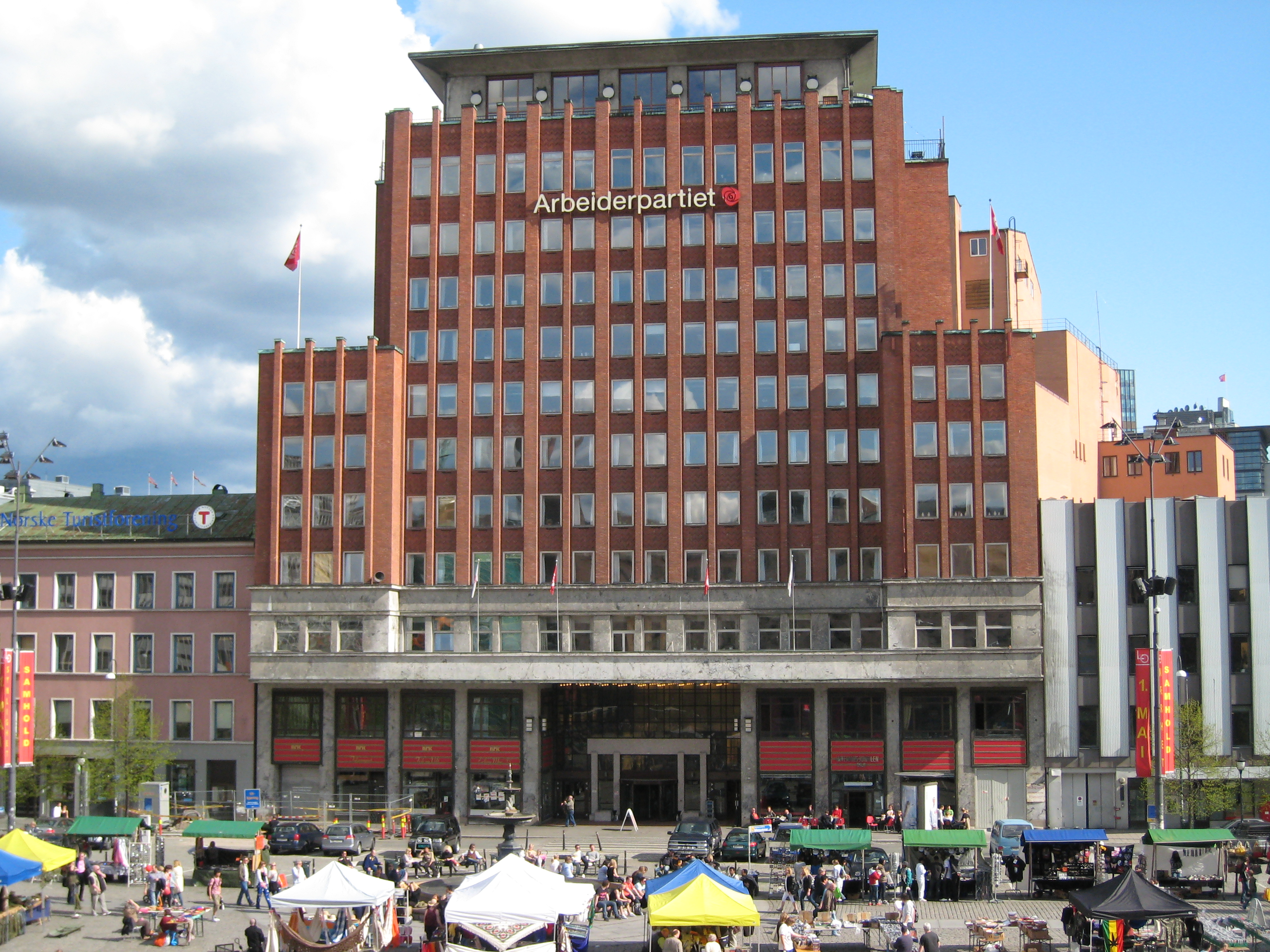
The Folketeatret building.

Media offices
Preceded by Per Bratland	Chief editor of Bergens Arbeiderblad; 1961–1964	Succeeded by O. R. Torvik
