= Mona Røkke =

Norwegian politician (1940–2013)

Governor of Vestfold
- In office 1 October 1989 – 31 March 2010
- Prime Minister: Jan P. Syse; Gro Harlem Brundtland; Thorbjørn Jagland; Kjell Magne Bondevik; Jens Stoltenberg
- Preceded by: Odd Vattekar
- Succeeded by: Erling Lae

Minister of Justice
- In office 14 October 1981 – 4 October 1985
- Prime Minister: Kåre Willoch
- Preceded by: Bjørn Skau
- Succeeded by: Wenche Frogn Sellæg

Member of the Norwegian Parliament
- In office 1 October 1977 – 30 September 1989
- Constituency: Buskerud

Personal details
- Born: Mona Scobie Røkke; 3 March 1940 Drammen, Buskerud, Norway
- Died: 13 July 2013 (aged 73) Tønsberg, Vestfold, Norway
- Party: Conservative

Mona Scobie Røkke (3 March 1940 – 13 July 2013) was a Norwegian and politician for the Conservative Party. She was the Minister of Justice from 1981 to 1985.

== Early life and career ==
She was born in Drammen as a daughter of Randal William Scobie (1904–1979) and Aslaug Høyendahl (1908–1997), both office managers. She finished her secondary education in 1958, and graduated from the University of Oslo with the cand.jur. degree in 1963. After seven years as a businesswoman in Drammen and Oslo, she was a police superintendent in Drammen from 1971 to 1977. The years 1973 and 1976 were exceptions; she served one year as deputy judge in Kongsberg District Court and one year as a lawyer in Drammen.

== Political career ==
Røkke started her political career in Drammen city council from 1971 to 1979. She chaired Drammen Conservative Women's League from 1974 to 1975, later the county league from 1976 to 1979 and the Conservative Women's League of Norway from 1979 to 1985. From 1976 to 1985 she was also a central board member of the Conservative Party. She ended her partisan tenure as chair of Drammen Conservative Party from 1988 to 1990. She was also deputy chair of the European Movement in Norway from 1986 to 1988.

She was elected to the Parliament of Norway from Buskerud in 1977, and was re-elected in 1981 and 1985. She was a member of the Standing Committee on Justice. From 1981 through 1985 she was a member of Willoch's First Cabinet as Minister of Justice. Her seat in Parliament was in turn filled by Øivin Skappel Fjeldstad, Hallgrim Berg and Odd Kallerud.

She then returned to Parliament for her second real term, serving in the Standing Committee on Defence and Standing Committee on Social Affairs until 1989. From 1987 she was also a delegate to the United Nations General Assembly. In October 1987 she was named as the County Governor of Vestfold, a position she assumed in 1989 after her parliamentary career. She served until her professional retirement in 2010. In March 2010 her successor as County Governor was announced as Erling Lae.

She chaired the corporate council of Telenor (1994–2005), was deputy chair of the Norwegian State Agriculture Bank and Landbrukets utviklingsfond (1994–1999). She also held a wide array of cultural posts, as deputy chair of the Norwegian Cancer Society (1988–1993) and the Norwegian Museum of Cultural History (1989–1997), deputy member of the Norwegian Nobel Committee (1991–1993) and board member of Kommunale kinematografers landsforbund (1976–1979) and Norsk Film (1992–1998).

She led the committee that published the Norwegian Official Report 1991:20 on legal protection of developmentally disabled. She was also a member of the committees that published the Norwegian Official Report 1992:1, 1995:26 and 2004:18.

She was decorated with the Order of the Lithuanian Grand Duke Gediminas in 2000 and as a Commander of the Order of St. Olav in 2005.

== Personal life ==
Mona Røkke was divorced and had two grown-up children and four grandchildren. She was diagnosed with cancer for the first time when she was quite young, and for the second time in 1985, while serving as Minister of Justice. Røkke went on sick leave for about one year before she returned to work as a member of parliament. She told about her experience with cancer and time as minister in the self-biography Ingen tid for tårer ("No Time for Tears") in 1986. She died in July 2013.

Government offices
Preceded by Bjørn Skau	Minister of Justice; 1981–1985	Succeeded by Wenche Frogn Sellæg
Civic offices
Preceded by Odd Vattekar	County Governor of Vestfold; 1989–2010	Succeeded by Erling Lae
