= Austrheim Municipality =

Municipality in Vestland, Norway

Austrheim Municipality Austrheim kommune
- Municipality
- Austreim herred (historic name)
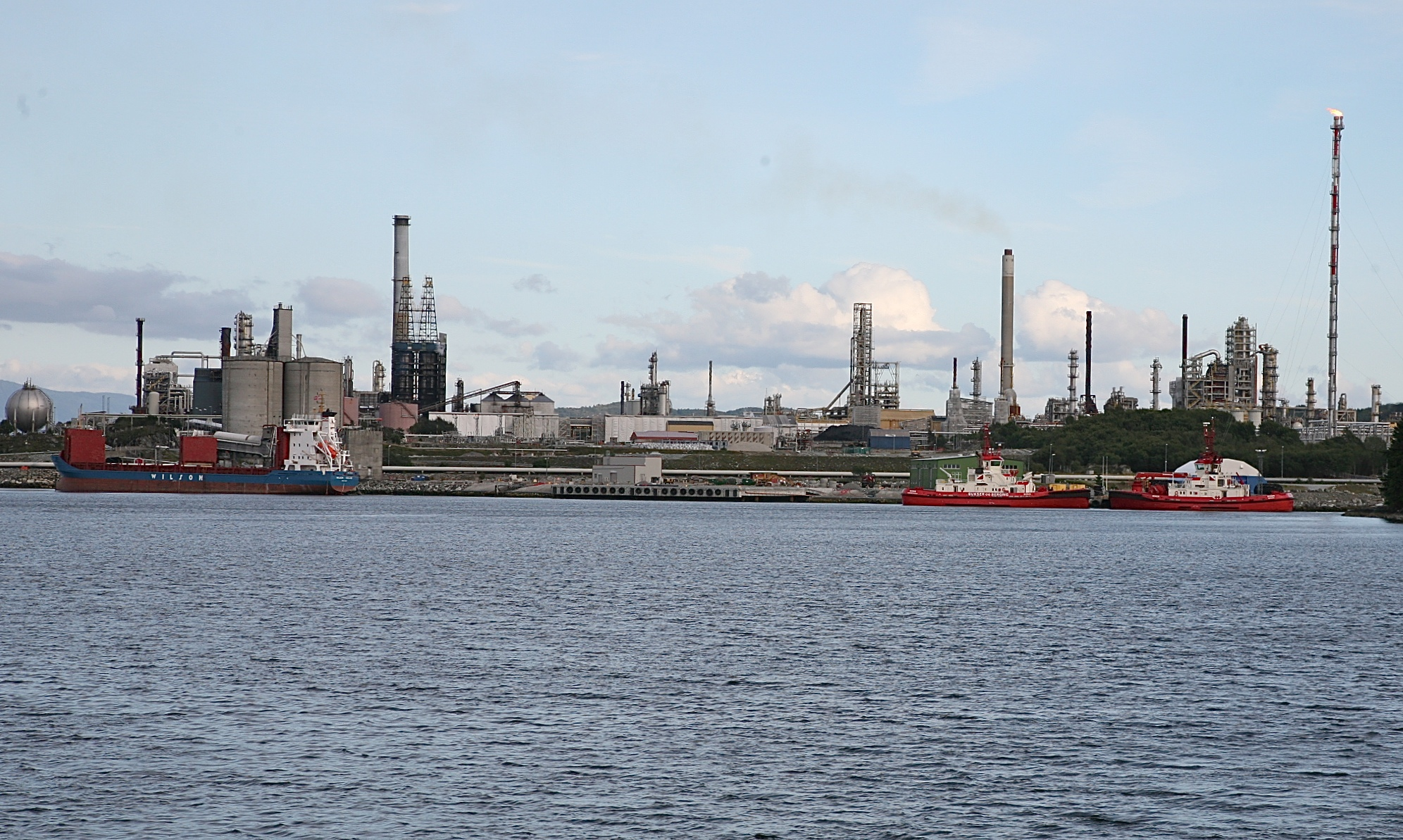
- View of the Mongstad area

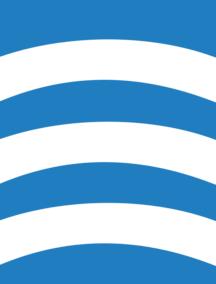
- Flag Coat of arms

- Vestland within Norway

- Austrheim within Vestland
- Coordinates: 60°46′16″N 04°55′34″E
- Country: Norway
- County: Vestland
- District: Nordhordland
- Established: 1 Jan 1910
  - Preceded by: Lindås Municipality
- Administrative centre: Årås

Government
  - Mayor (2023): Morten Sognnes (H)

Area
  - Total: 57.54 km^{2} (22.22 sq mi)
  - Land: 56.80 km^{2} (21.93 sq mi)
  - Water: 0.74 km^{2} (0.29 sq mi) 1.3%
  - Rank: #348 in Norway
- Highest elevation: 109.13 m (358.0 ft)

Population (2025)
  - Total: 2,915
  - Rank: #234 in Norway
  - Density: 50.7/km^{2} (131/sq mi)
  - Change (10 years): ▲ +1.7%
- Demonym: Austrheiming

Official language
  - Norwegian form: Nynorsk
- Time zone: UTC+01:00 (CET)
  - Summer (DST): UTC+02:00 (CEST)
- ISO 3166 code: NO-4632
- Website: Official website

Austrheim is a municipality in the Nordhordland region of Vestland county, Norway. The administrative centre of the municipality is the village of Årås. Other villages in the municipality include Austrheim and Kaland. The Mongstad industrial area lies along the border of Austrheim and neighboring Alver Municipality. The westernmost point of mainland Norway is Vardetangen which is located in the municipality.

The 57.54-square-kilometre (22.22 sq mi) municipality is the 348th largest by area out of the 357 municipalities in Norway. Austrheim Municipality is the 234th most populous municipality in Norway with a population of 2,915. The municipality's population density is 50.7 inhabitants per square kilometre (131/sq mi) and its population has increased by 1.7% over the previous 10-year period.

== General information ==
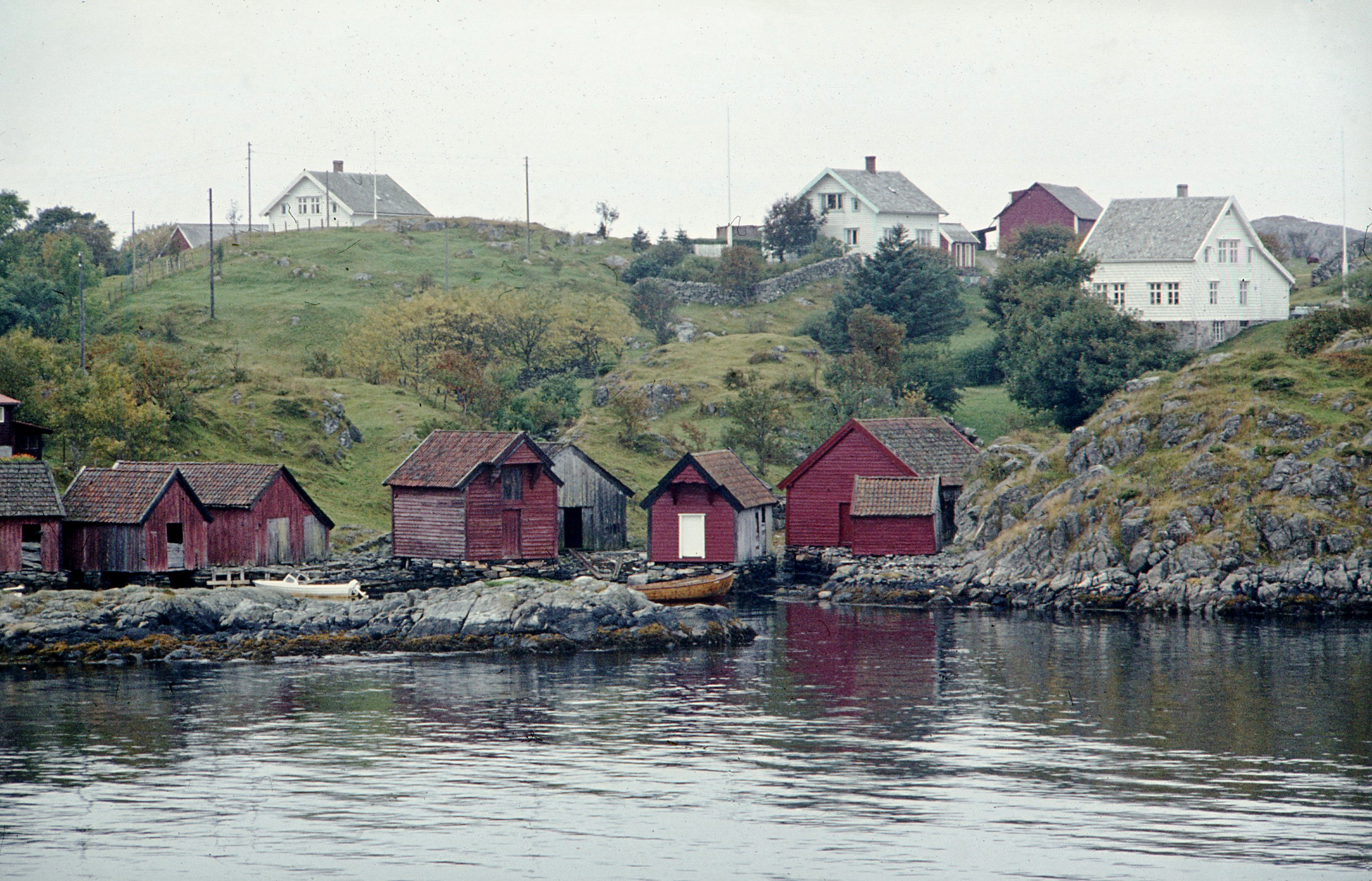
View of a small fishing village area in Austrheim

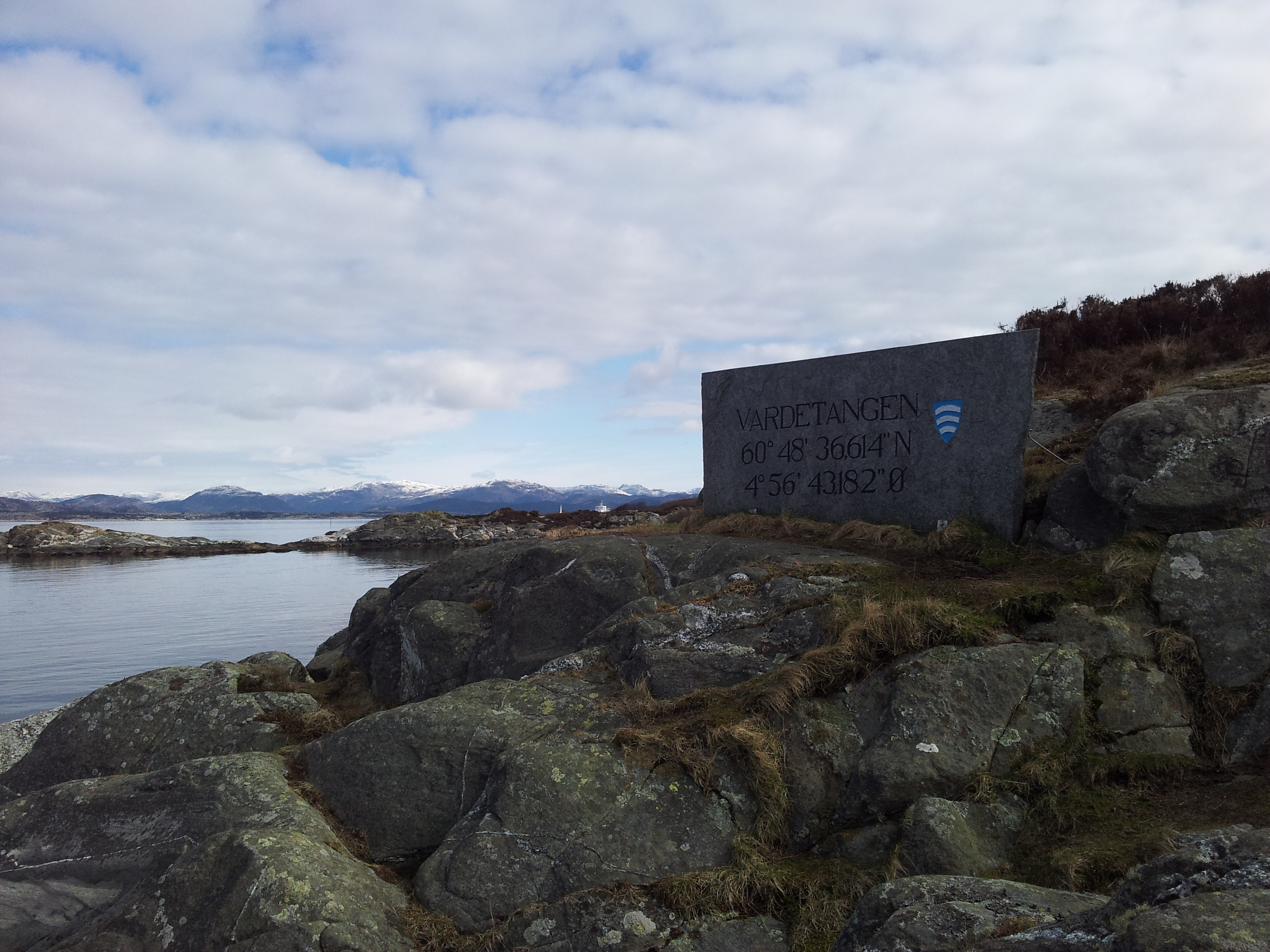
View of Vardetangen

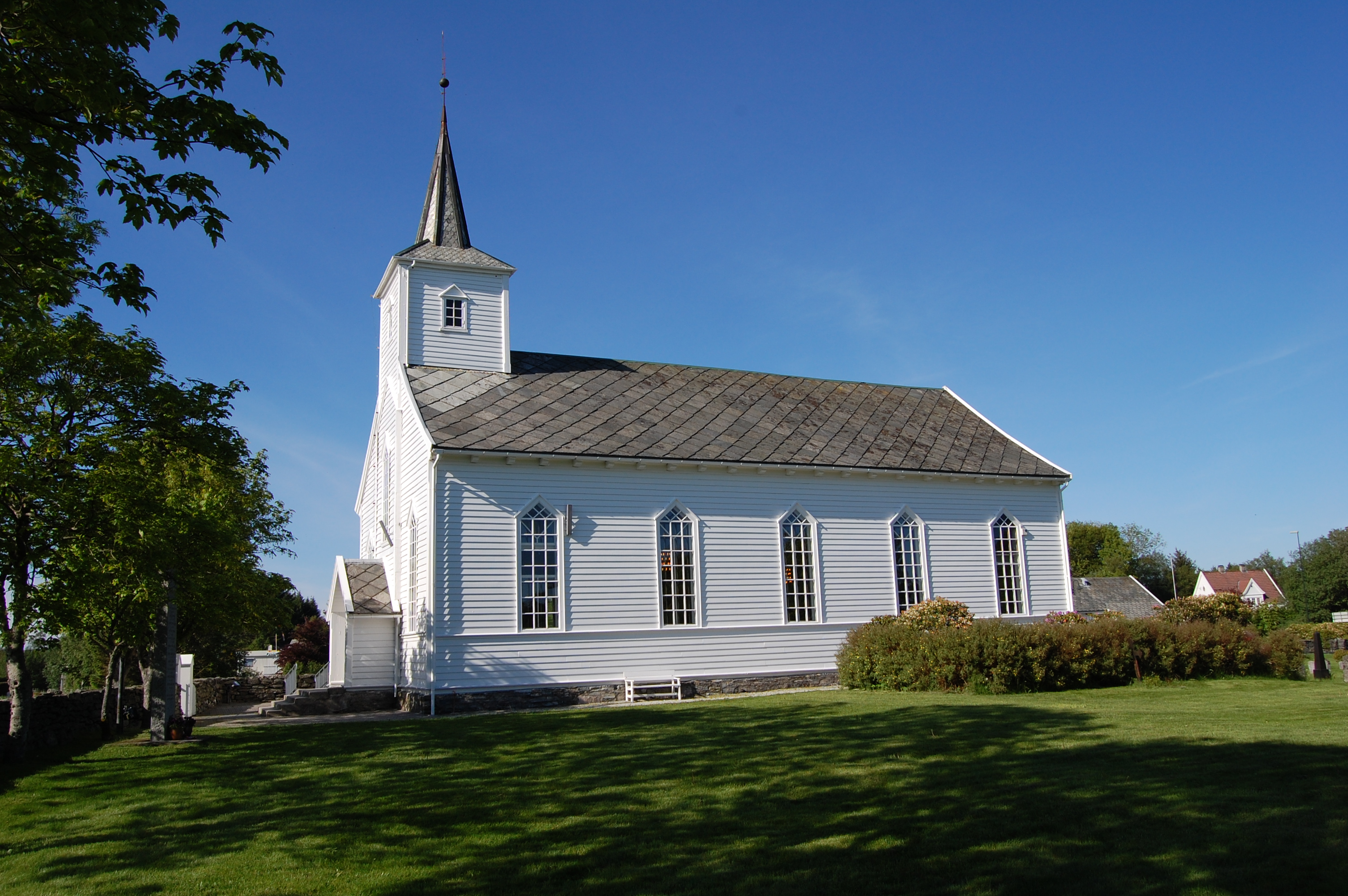
Austrheim Church

Historically, the area that is now Austrheim Municipality was a part of the large Lindås Municipality. On 1 January 1910, the northwestern district of Lindås (population: 2,518) was separated from Lindås to form the new Austrheim Municipality. On 1 January 1947, all of the islands located west of the Fedjefjorden (population: 920) were separated to form the new Fedje Municipality. During the 1960s, there were many municipal mergers across Norway due to the work of the Schei Committee. On 1 January 1964, the Straume area on the island of Radøy (population: 56) was transferred from Austrheim Municipality to the new Radøy Municipality.

Historically, this municipality was part of the old Hordaland county. On 1 January 2020, the municipality became a part of the newly-formed Vestland county (after Hordaland and Sogn og Fjordane counties were merged).

=== Name ===
The municipality (originally the parish) is named after the old Austrheim farm (Old Norse: Austrheimr) since the first Austrheim Church was built there. The first element is austr which means "east". The last element is heimr which means "homestead" or "village". Until 1889, the village and parish name was written Østereim. After that the spelling was changed to Austreim, using the Nynorsk spelling. On 30 April 1907, a royal resolution changed the spelling of the name to Austrheim after a recommendation to change from Postvesenet, the Norwegian postal service. The municipality was established in 1910, but the old Austreim spelling was still used for some time until the new spelling became more commonly used.

=== Coat of arms ===
The coat of arms was granted on 17 February 1989. The official blazon is "Azure, three bars embowed argent" (Norwegian: På blå grunn tre sølv bjelkar bøygde oppover). This means the arms have a blue field (background) and the ordinary is a set of three arched bars. The bars have a tincture of argent which means they are commonly colored white, but if the arms are made out of metal, then silver is used. The three bows represent the many bridges in the island municipality. The color blue was chosen to represent the sea and the white/silver was to represent the land. The arms were designed by Svein Skauge. The municipal flag has the same design as the coat of arms.

=== Churches ===
The Church of Norway has one parish (sokn) within Austrheim Municipality. It is part of the Nordhordland prosti (deanery) in the Diocese of Bjørgvin.

Churches in Austrheim Municipality
Parish (sokn)	Church name	Location of the church	Year built
Austrheim	Austrheim Church	Austrheim	1865

== Government ==
Austrheim Municipality is responsible for primary education (through 10th grade), outpatient health services, senior citizen services, welfare and other social services, zoning, economic development, and municipal roads and utilities. The municipality is governed by a municipal council of directly elected representatives. The mayor is indirectly elected by a vote of the municipal council. The municipality is under the jurisdiction of the Hordaland District Court and the Gulating Court of Appeal.

=== Municipal council ===
The municipal council (Kommunestyre) of Austrheim Municipality is made up of 17 representatives that are elected to four-year terms. The tables below show the current and historical composition of the council by political party.

Austrheim kommunestyre 2023–2027
Party name (in Nynorsk)	Number of representatives
Labour Party (Arbeidarpartiet)	6
Conservative Party (Høgre)	5
Industry and Business Party (Industri‑ og Næringspartiet)	1
Centre Party (Senterpartiet)	3
Common List in Austrheim (Samlingslista i Austrheim)	2
Total number of members:	17

Austrheim kommunestyre 2019–2023
Party name (in Nynorsk)	Number of representatives
Labour Party (Arbeidarpartiet)	6
Conservative Party (Høgre)	4
Christian Democratic Party (Kristeleg Folkeparti)	3
Centre Party (Senterpartiet)	3
Local List in Austrheim (Bygdelista i Austrheim)	1
Total number of members:	17

Austrheim kommunestyre 2015–2019
Party name (in Nynorsk)	Number of representatives
Labour Party (Arbeidarpartiet)	8
Conservative Party (Høgre)	4
Christian Democratic Party (Kristeleg Folkeparti)	2
Centre Party (Senterpartiet)	1
Liberal Party (Venstre)	2
Total number of members:	17

Austrheim kommunestyre 2011–2015
Party name (in Nynorsk)	Number of representatives
Labour Party (Arbeidarpartiet)	6
Progress Party (Framstegspartiet)	1
Conservative Party (Høgre)	5
Christian Democratic Party (Kristeleg Folkeparti)	2
Centre Party (Senterpartiet)	1
Liberal Party (Venstre)	2
Total number of members:	17

Austrheim kommunestyre 2007–2011
Party name (in Nynorsk)	Number of representatives
Labour Party (Arbeidarpartiet)	5
Progress Party (Framstegspartiet)	2
Conservative Party (Høgre)	4
Christian Democratic Party (Kristeleg Folkeparti)	3
Centre Party (Senterpartiet)	1
Liberal Party (Venstre)	2
Total number of members:	17

Austrheim kommunestyre 2003–2007
Party name (in Nynorsk)	Number of representatives
Labour Party (Arbeidarpartiet)	5
Progress Party (Framstegspartiet)	2
Conservative Party (Høgre)	2
Christian Democratic Party (Kristeleg Folkeparti)	2
Centre Party (Senterpartiet)	2
Liberal Party (Venstre)	1
Local list (Bygdelista)	3
Total number of members:	17

Austrheim kommunestyre 1999–2003
Party name (in Nynorsk)	Number of representatives
Labour Party (Arbeidarpartiet)	5
Progress Party (Framstegspartiet)	1
Conservative Party (Høgre)	4
Christian Democratic Party (Kristeleg Folkeparti)	3
Centre Party (Senterpartiet)	1
Liberal Party (Venstre)	1
Local list (Bygdelista)	2
Total number of members:	17

Austrheim kommunestyre 1995–1999
Party name (in Nynorsk)	Number of representatives
Labour Party (Arbeidarpartiet)	5
Conservative Party (Høgre)	3
Christian Democratic Party (Kristeleg Folkeparti)	3
Centre Party (Senterpartiet)	2
Liberal Party (Venstre)	1
Local list (Bygdelista)	3
Total number of members:	17

Austrheim kommunestyre 1991–1995
Party name (in Nynorsk)	Number of representatives
Labour Party (Arbeidarpartiet)	4
Conservative Party (Høgre)	5
Christian Democratic Party (Kristeleg Folkeparti)	4
Centre Party (Senterpartiet)	3
Liberal Party (Venstre)	1
Total number of members:	17

Austrheim kommunestyre 1987–1991
Party name (in Nynorsk)	Number of representatives
Labour Party (Arbeidarpartiet)	4
Progress Party (Framstegspartiet)	1
Conservative Party (Høgre)	4
Christian Democratic Party (Kristeleg Folkeparti)	6
Centre Party (Senterpartiet)	1
Liberal Party (Venstre)	1
Total number of members:	17

Austrheim kommunestyre 1983–1987
Party name (in Nynorsk)	Number of representatives
Labour Party (Arbeidarpartiet)	4
Conservative Party (Høgre)	5
Christian Democratic Party (Kristeleg Folkeparti)	5
Centre Party (Senterpartiet)	2
Liberal Party (Venstre)	1
Total number of members:	17

Austrheim kommunestyre 1979–1983
Party name (in Nynorsk)	Number of representatives
Labour Party (Arbeidarpartiet)	4
Conservative Party (Høgre)	7
Christian Democratic Party (Kristeleg Folkeparti)	3
Centre Party (Senterpartiet)	1
Local list (Bygdeliste)	2
Total number of members:	17

Austrheim kommunestyre 1975–1979
Party name (in Nynorsk)	Number of representatives
Labour Party (Arbeidarpartiet)	3
Conservative Party (Høgre)	4
Christian Democratic Party (Kristeleg Folkeparti)	4
New People's Party (Nye Folkepartiet)	4
Centre Party (Senterpartiet)	2
Total number of members:	17

Austrheim kommunestyre 1971–1975
Party name (in Nynorsk)	Number of representatives
Labour Party (Arbeidarpartiet)	4
Conservative Party (Høgre)	3
Christian Democratic Party (Kristeleg Folkeparti)	3
Centre Party (Senterpartiet)	2
Liberal Party (Venstre)	5
Total number of members:	17

Austrheim kommunestyre 1967–1971
Party name (in Nynorsk)	Number of representatives
Conservative Party (Høgre)	3
Christian Democratic Party (Kristeleg Folkeparti)	2
Liberal Party (Venstre)	5
Local List(s) (Lokale lister)	7
Total number of members:	17

Austrheim kommunestyre 1963–1967
Party name (in Nynorsk)	Number of representatives
Conservative Party (Høgre)	2
Liberal Party (Venstre)	4
Local List(s) (Lokale lister)	11
Total number of members:	17

Austrheim heradsstyre 1959–1963
Party name (in Nynorsk)	Number of representatives
Liberal Party (Venstre)	3
Local List(s) (Lokale lister)	14
Total number of members:	17

Austrheim heradsstyre 1955–1959
Party name (in Nynorsk)	Number of representatives
Liberal Party (Venstre)	2
Local List(s) (Lokale lister)	15
Total number of members:	17

Austrheim heradsstyre 1951–1955
Party name (in Nynorsk)	Number of representatives
Liberal Party (Venstre)	3
Local List(s) (Lokale lister)	13
Total number of members:	16

Austrheim heradsstyre 1947–1951
Party name (in Nynorsk)	Number of representatives
Labour Party (Arbeidarpartiet)	2
Christian Democratic Party (Kristeleg Folkeparti)	2
Liberal Party (Venstre)	1
Joint List(s) of Non-Socialist Parties (Borgarlege Felleslister)	4
Local List(s) (Lokale lister)	7
Total number of members:	16

Austrheim heradsstyre 1945–1947
Party name (in Nynorsk)	Number of representatives
Labour Party (Arbeidarpartiet)	1
List of workers, fishermen, and small farmholders (Arbeidarar, fiskarar, småbrukarar liste)	5
Local List(s) (Lokale lister)	12
Total number of members:	18

Austrheim heradsstyre 1937–1941*
Party name (in Nynorsk)	Number of representatives
Labour Party (Arbeidarpartiet)	4
List of workers, fishermen, and small farmholders (Arbeidarar, fiskarar, småbrukarar liste)	5
Joint List(s) of Non-Socialist Parties (Borgarlege Felleslister)	9
Total number of members:	18
Note: Due to the German occupation of Norway during World War II, no elections were held for new municipal councils until after the war ended in 1945.

=== Mayors ===
The mayor (Nynorsk: ordførar) of Austrheim Municipality is the political leader of the municipality and the chairperson of the municipal council. Here is a list of people who have held this position:

- 1910–1914: Andreas Haraldsen
- 1915–1919: Nils Fjellanger
- 1919–1931: Hans Utkilen
- 1931–1934: Mikal Hjertaas
- 1934–1937: Jørgen Sætre
- 1937–1945: Andreas Haraldsen Daae
- 1946–1951: Samuel Lervåg
- 1951–1955: Ludvig Martin Daae (KrF)
- 1955–1975: Samuel Lervåg (V)
- 1975–1977: Knut Johannes Risnes (KrF)
- 1977–1986: Asbjørn Fjeld (H)
- 1986–1992: Knut Johannes Risnes (KrF)
- 1992–1999: Ole Lysø (Ap)
- 1999–2003: Rolf Sandstad (KrF)
- 2003–2011: Ole Lysø (Ap)
- 2011–2023: Per Lerøy (Ap)
- 2023–present: Morten Sognnes (H)

=== Police ===
In 2016, the chief of police for Vestlandet formally suggested a reconfiguration of police districts and stations. He proposed that the police station for Austrheim and Fedje be closed.

== Economy ==
The Mongstad industrial complex lies on the border of Austrheim and Lindås. It is the largest oil port and refinery in Norway, is responsible for about 70% of all wet bulk. Many residents of Austrheim work at the facility.

== Population ==
Historical population
Year	1910	1920	1930	1946	1951	1960	1970	1980	1990	2000	2010	2020	2023
Pop.	1,763	1,935	2,061	2,304	2,390	2,216	1,880	2,549	2,684	2,527	2,738	2,870	2,856
±% p.a.	—	+0.94%	+0.63%	+0.70%	+0.74%	−0.84%	−1.63%	+3.09%	+0.52%	−0.60%	+0.81%	+0.47%	−0.16%
Source: Statistics Norway and Norwegian Historical Data Centre

== Geography ==
Austrheim is an island municipality in the Nordhordland region of Vestland county. It is located south of the Fensfjorden, east of the Fedjefjorden, north of the island of Radøy, and west of the Lindås peninsula. The municipality includes the far northwestern tip of the peninsula as well as many islands. The largest island (by far) is the island of Fosnøyna, where the municipal centre is located.

Gulen Municipality is located to the north (across the fjord), Fedje Municipality is located on islands to the west, Alver Municipality lies to the south. The highest point in the municipality is the 109.13-metre (358.0 ft) tall mountain Litlåsfjellet, located just west of Mongstad.

== Notable people ==
- Kornelius Bergsvik (1889 in Austrheim – 1975), a Norwegian politician and County Governor of Telemark
- Karsten Solheim (1911–2000), a golf equipment manufacturer who emigrated to the United States when he was two years old
- Haakon Austrheim, a geology professor in Oslo
- Roger Helland (born 1993 in Austrheim), a former football player with over 230 club caps
- Gunnar Norebø (born 1976 in Austrheim), a retired Norwegian football midfielder
