= List of county governors of Vestfold =

The County Governor of Vestfold (Norwegian: Fylkesmann i Vestfold) was the county governor for Vestfold county in Norway from 1821 until the office was abolished in 2019. The office of county governor is a government agency of the Kingdom of Norway which represents the national government in each county. The county governor is an appointed position. On 1 January 2019, this office was merged with the County Governor of Telemark into the County Governor of Vestfold og Telemark (this was done in preparation for the merger of the two counties in 2020).

The governor is the government's representative in the county. They carry out the resolutions and guidelines of the Storting and government. This is done first by the county governor performing administrative tasks on behalf of the ministries. Secondly, the county governor also monitors the activities of the municipalities and is the appeal body for many types of municipal decisions.

== History ==
In 1821, the government of Norway established Jarlsberg og Laurvig as an amt (or county). Prior to that time, the county fell under the governance of the Count of Larvik and the Count of Jarlsberg. The county was subordinate to the Diocesan Governor of Christiania. In 1919, the name of the county was changed to Vestfold fylke. On 1 January 2019, the office was merged creating the new office of County Governor of Vestfold og Telemark in preparation for the merger of the neighboring counties of Telemark and Vestfold to form Vestfold og Telemark county on 1 January 2020.

== Title ==
The word for county (amt or fylke) and the name of the county have both changed over time. Therefore the title of the officeholder has also changed.

- From 1821 until 1877, the title for each officeholder was Amtmann i Jarlsberg og Laurvigs amt.
- From 1877 until 31 December 1918, the title for each officeholder was Amtmann i Jarlsberg og Larvik amt.
- From 1 January 1919 to 1 January 2019, the title for each officeholder was Fylkesmann i Vestfold.

== List of officeholders ==
Vestfold county has had the following governors:

County governors of Vestfold
Start	End	Name
1821	1829	Georg Jacob Bull (1785–1854)
1829	1833	Johan Henrik Rye (1787–1868)
1833	1864	Ulrik Frederik Cappelen (1797–1864)
1865	1882	Johan Christian Georg Hvoslef (1819–1889)
1882	1902	Carl Johan Michelet (1826–1902)
1902	1905	Thomas von Westen Engelhart (1850–1905)
1905	1908	Ulrik Frederik Cappelen Krohn (1867–1944)
1908	1924	Abraham Berge (1851–1936)
1924	1938	Herman Meinich (1868–1948)
1938	1948	Johannes Gerckens Bassøe (1878–1962); Removed from office 1942-1945 during the occupied government.
1942	1943	Halvor Pedersen Hektoen (1884–1960) (WWII Occupied government)
1944	1945	Christopher Andreas Hoxmark Lange (1894–1989) (WWII Occupied government)
1948	1958	Oscar Fredrik Torp (1893–1958) (He spent most of this time in Parliament and as Prime Minister of Norway. Gerhard Dahl served as acting governor during most of Torp's term.)
1958	1964	Gerhard Dahl (1905–1964)
1964	1979	Olav Redvald Grove (1909–1997)
1979	1988	Odd Vattekar (1918–1992)
1989	2010	Mona Røkke (1940–2013)
2010	2016	Erling Lae (born 1947)
2016	2022	Per Arne Olsen (1961–2022)
Office abolished on 1 January 2019, see List of county governors of Vestfold og Telemark
