= Olav Grove =

Governor of Vestfold
- In office 1964–1979
- Preceded by: Gerhard Dahl
- Succeeded by: Odd Vattekar

Personal details
- Born: 10 May 1909 Voss Municipality, Norway
- Died: 6 August 1997 (aged 88) Tønsberg, Norway
- Citizenship: Norway
- Occupation: Civil servant

Olav Redvald Grove (10 May 1909 – 6 August 1997) was a Norwegian civil servant and government official. He served as the County Governor of Vestfold county from 1964 until his retirement in 1979. During his career, he held a wide range of public offices.

Olav Grove was hired as the office manager for the County Governor of Oslo and Akershus in 1946. During the time that Trygve Lie was the County Governor of Oslo and Akershus, Grove was appointed as acting county governor several times while Lie was serving in other positions, including the years 1957, 1959–1961, and 1963–1964. In 1964, Olav Grove was appointed to be the County Governor of Vestfold. He held that position until his retirement in 1979. He died in August 1997 in Tønsberg.

Government offices
Preceded by Gerhard Dahl	County Governor of Vestfold; 1964–1979	Succeeded by Odd Vattekar
