= Niels Mathias Rye =

Norwegian politician

Niels Mathias Rye (24 August 1824 – 6 February 1905) was a Norwegian politician.

== Biography ==
Niels Rye was born at Bø i Telemark in 1824, as the son of Lieutenant Colonel Johan Mathias Rye (1793–1860) and Christiane Elisabeth Sparre, née Gasmann. He was a brother of Diderik Hegermann Rye. He married Thale Cathrine Rye, daughter of former President of the Storting Johan Henrik Rye.

Having graduated with the cand.jur. degree from the Royal Frederick University in 1846, Rye started a career as a civil servant in Norwegian government ministries. He started as a clerk in the Ministry of the Interior and handled postal affairs. He eventually advanced to higher positions, being appointed head of division in the General Post Directorate in 1857. His tenure ended fairly quickly as the agency existed only from 1857 to 1860. In 1860, Rye moved to the Ministry of the Navy and Postal Affairs, the new name of the ministry following a restructure and became deputy secretary (ekspedisjonssekretær) in 1863.

In 1869, Rye left his position to become County Governor of Søndre Bergenhus (today named Hordaland). In 1877, he was elected to the Norwegian Parliament, representing the constituency of Bergen. He served a two-year term but was not re-elected. Instead, he returned to a post as County Governor; this time in Bratsberg (today named Telemark) to which he had been appointed in 1877. In 1880, he moved on to be County Governor of Kristiania.

Rye eventually returned to the national political scene. He was appointed acting Minister of the Interior from 21 March to 3 April 1884, and acting Prime Minister from 29 March to 3 April 1884. This was a turbulent year in Norwegian politics: Rye replaced Ole Andreas Bachke, who himself was acting Prime Minister, following the impeachment case of the Prime Minister Christian Selmer's Cabinet. On 3 April, a new cabinet was finally constituted. It lasted only two months, being replaced by the Liberal Cabinet of Johan Sverdrup on 26 June.

Rye died in February 1905, weeks after his retirement from the position of county governor of Kristiania. He was buried at Vår Frelsers gravlund.

Government offices
Preceded by Hans Thomas Meinich	County Governor of Søndre Bergenhus amt 1869–1877	Succeeded by Claus Nieuwejaar Worsøe
Preceded by Hans J. C. Aall	County Governor of Bratsberg amt 1877–1880	Succeeded by Ulrik Frederik Arneberg
Preceded by August Christian Manthey	County Governor of Kristiania stiftamt 1880–1905	Succeeded by Otto Albert Blehr
Preceded by Niels Petersen Vogt	Minister of the Interior (acting); March 1884–April 1884	Succeeded by Thomas Cathinco Bang
Preceded by Ole Bachke (acting)	Prime Minister of Norway (acting); March 1884–April 1884	Succeeded by Christian Homann Schweigaard
