= Oscar Torp =

Norwegian politician (1893–1958)

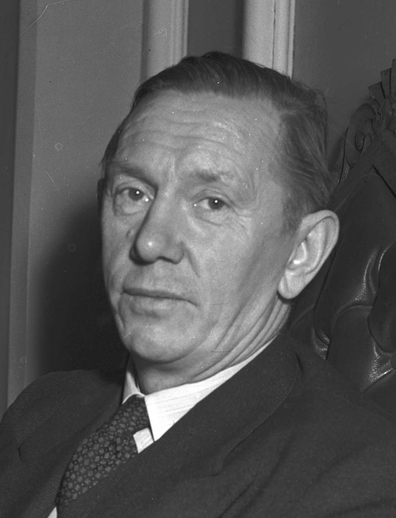
- Torp in April 1950

Prime Minister of Norway
- In office 19 November 1951 – 22 January 1955
- Monarch: Haakon VII
- Preceded by: Einar Gerhardsen
- Succeeded by: Einar Gerhardsen

President of the Storting
- In office 24 January 1955 – 1 May 1958
- Monarch: Haakon VII
- Prime Minister: Einar Gerhardsen
- Vice President: Nils Langhelle
- Preceded by: Einar Gerhardsen
- Succeeded by: Nils Langhelle

County Governor of Vestfold
- In office 1 January 1948 – 1 May 1958
- Monarch: Haakon VII
- Prime Minister: Einar Gerhardsen; Himself; Einar Gerhardsen
- Preceded by: Johannes Gerckens Bassøe
- Succeeded by: Gerhard Dahl

Minister of Finance
- In office 1 July 1939 – 20 March 1942
- Prime Minister: Johan Nygaardsvold
- Preceded by: Kornelius Bergsvik
- Succeeded by: Paul Hartmann

Minister of Defence
- In office 20 March 1942 – 5 November 1945
- Prime Minister: Johan Nygaardsvold; Einar Gerhardsen
- Preceded by: Birger Ljungberg
- Succeeded by: Jens Chr. Hauge
- In office 20 December 1935 – 15 August 1936; Acting
- Prime Minister: Johan Nygaardsvold
- Preceded by: Adolf Indrebø (Acting)
- Succeeded by: Fredrik Monsen

Minister of Social Affairs
- In office 13 November 1936 – 1 July 1939
- Prime Minister: Johan Nygaardsvold
- Preceded by: Kornelius Bergsvik
- Succeeded by: Sverre Støstad

Minister of Provisioning and Reconstruction
- In office 25 June 1945 – 10 January 1948
- Prime Minister: Einar Gerhardsen
- Preceded by: Egil Offenberg
- Succeeded by: Nils Hønsvald

Minister of Trade and Shipping
- Acting
- In office 2 June 1954 – 15 June 1954
- Prime Minister: Himself
- Preceded by: Erik Brofoss
- Succeeded by: Nils Langhelle

Mayor of Oslo
- In office 1 January 1936 – 13 November 1936
- Preceded by: Trygve Nilsen
- Succeeded by: Trygve Nilsen
- In office 1 January 1935 – 20 March 1935
- Preceded by: Eyvind Getz
- Succeeded by: Trygve Nilsen

Leader of the Labour Party
- In office 1923–1945
- Preceded by: Emil Stang
- Succeeded by: Einar Gerhardsen

Member of the Norwegian Parliament
- In office 1 January 1937 – 1 May 1958
- Deputy: Eugen Amandus Pettersen; Carl Henry; Gunvor Katharina Eker
- Constituency: Oslo (1937–1949); Vestfold (1949–1958)

Personal details
- Born: Oscar Frederik Torp; 8 June 1893 Skjeberg, Østfold, Sweden-Norway
- Died: 1 May 1958 (aged 64) Oslo, Norway
- Party: Labour
- Spouse: Kari Hansen
- Profession: Civil servant Electrician

Oscar Fredrik Torp (8 June 1893 – 1 May 1958) was a Norwegian politician for the Norwegian Labour Party. He was party leader from 1923 to 1945, and mayor of Oslo in 1935 and 1936. In 1935 he became the acting minister of defence in the government of Johan Nygaardsvold. He was also the minister of social affairs from 1936 to 1939, and then the minister of finance from 1939 to 1942. He was appointed minister of defence again in 1942 in the London-based Norwegian exile government. He continued until the election in 1945 when he became the minister of provisioning and reconstruction until 1948.

Hailing from Skjeberg, he was first elected to the Parliament of Norway representing Oslo in 1936, but did not take a seat in the Parliament until 1948. He then became the faction leader for the Labour Party in Parliament. He became the prime minister of Norway in 1951 when Einar Gerhardsen stepped down from this position; the move was reversed in 1955 when Torp became the president of the Storting. He held this position until his death.

== Early life and career ==
He was born in Skjeberg as a son of Anton Fredrik Andersen Torp (1865–1907) and Anne Bolette Andreassen Gade (1867–1932). He had eight siblings, and lost his father at a young age. His father worked in Canada from 1903, and sailed home to collect his family to emigrate to Canada in 1907. However he died en route, near Liverpool. Torp attended primary school before joining the workforce at age 13. He eventually became an electrician, and already at the age of 14 he became deputy treasurer in his local trade union. He also joined the Norwegian Labour Party, and was elected to the national board in 1918, when an opposition of revolutionaries assumed power in the party. Torp chaired the party chapter in Sarpsborg from 1919 to 1921 and in Østfold county from 1921 to 1923. He was also a supervisory council member in the Norwegian Confederation of Trade Unions from 1920 to 1925, and board chairman of Østfold Arbeiderblad from 1921 to 1923. He was married to Kari Hansen (1893–1967) since April 1916. He was the father of Reidar Torp.

== Party chairman and cabinet member ==
In 1922 Torp was a delegate at the Fourth Comintern Congress. In 1923 the revolutionary wing that had assumed power in the Labour Party in 1918 had split into two wings, one for and one against Comintern membership. Torp belonged to the latter wing, which assumed power at the 1923 national convention. Torp was elected chairman of the entire party. When he became chairman, the chairman of the party's youth wing (Peder Furubotn) was four years older than he was. Torp chaired the party until 1945. It has often been said, however, that Martin Tranmæl was the "real" chairman of the Labour Party.

Torp had been a member of Sarpsborg city council from 1919 to 1923 and deputy member of Aker municipal council from 1925 to 1928 when he in 1930 moved to Oslo. He served as mayor in 1935 and 1936, and was elected to the Parliament of Norway in the 1936 Norwegian parliamentary election. By that time he had already become acting Minister of Defence in Nygaardsvold's Cabinet, filling in for Fredrik Monsen who was ill. He was then Minister of Social Affairs from November 1936 to July 1939, and Minister of Finance from July 1939 to March 1942. In April 1940 Norway had been invaded by Nazi Germany, and Torp was responsible for initiating the successful flight of the Norwegian National Treasury. After overseeing the start of the flight, he fled together with the rest of Nygaardsvold's Cabinet. In Åndalsnes he was injured in the foot during the German air raids. The Cabinet ultimately reached Tromsø where they embarked for England, where they stayed until the war's end. Torp was acting Minister of Defence from November 1941 to February 1942, and then the permanent Minister of Defence from March 1942 to November 1945, in Nygaardsvold's and Gerhardsen's First Cabinet. Torp was a former antimilitarist, and was imprisoned for five months in 1924 as he called for a military strike, but shed this ideology from the mid-1930s.

Before the Second World War, Torp was also chairman of Bærumsbanen from 1935 to 1940, Oslo Sporveier from 1935 to 1940 and the Oslo airport committee from 1935 to 1940. He was a board member of Folketeaterbygningen from 1935 to 1940, Idrettskomiteen av 1935, and Felleskomiteen for forstadsbanene from 1935 to 1940. He was a deputy board member of Norges Kommunalbank from 1935 to 1940. All of these positions were lost when he fled the country.

== Post-war career ==
The German occupation ended on 8 May 1945, and the exiled politicians returned home. Torp chaired the Government Delegation from London to Oslo on 14 May 1945, and until 31 May 1945 he was thus the acting prime minister and acting minister of foreign affairs in Oslo.

Much because of his exile, Torp was no longer found fit to be party chairman, and was replaced, against the party by-laws. He was also demoted to Minister of Provisioning and Reconstruction in Gerhardsen's Second Cabinet. He was pressured to leave this office as well, and left on 10 January 1948. He sat through his parliamentary term to which he had been elected in 1945; until 1948 the deputy Eugen Amandus Pettersen had taken his seat. He was also the Labour Party parliamentary leader. He moved to Vestfold in 1948 as he was appointed County Governor there. After a short time, he decided to stand for election again, and in 1949 he was elected for the Market towns of Vestfold county. In the same year he was one of the architects behind the Norwegian NATO membership. During his absence from his job as county governor, Gerhard Dahl served as acting governor, since Torp was absent almost the entire time that he was governor.

== Prime minister ==
In November 1951 a political shock happened in Norway as Einar Gerhardsen unexpectedly resigned as Prime Minister of Norway. Gerhardsen then asked Oscar Torp to take over. Reportedly, Gerhardsen favored Sverre Støstad, but he rejected the offer. Torp led his cabinet for four years, and also had to double as acting Minister of Trade and Shipping from 3 to 15 June 1954. Carl Henry took his seat in Parliament.

== Domestic statesmanship ==
Torp was pressured to give the position back to Gerhardsen in January 1955, when Gerhardsen had strengthened himself for a few years as party chairman and President of the Storting. Torp, who was re-elected to Parliament in 1953 and 1957, succeeded Gerhardsen as President of the Storting, a position he held until his death. He was also County Governor until his death, albeit he was absent from the position for most of the time. Gunvor Katharina Eker took his seat after his death.

Torp was a member of the Labour Party central board and national board from 1945 to his death. He was also a board member of the Norwegian State Railways from 1948–1957 and chairman of the supervisory council of Folketeatret from 1948 to his death. In Vestfold he held a multitude of local chairmanships, including of the county tax board and the administration (Norwegian: Stiftsdireksjon) of the Diocese of Tunsberg.

== Death ==
Torp had a cerebral haemorrhage in the early 1950s, which he kept secret to most his acquaintances, even family. On 1 May 1958 he had a new cerebral haemorrhage, this time with a fatal outcome. He died at Rikshospitalet. This was May Day, and Torp was scheduled as the main speaker in Stavanger. He was not able to do it, and thus, Arne Skaug read Torp's manuscript. When the speech was referred to in the newspapers the next day, it was accompanied by obituaries of Torp. He was buried at Vår Frelsers gravlund. A memorial stone was raised in Skjeberg in 1976.

Books about Torp include Nils Hønsvald's Oscar Torp, released in 1959, and Egil Helle's Oscar Torp – arbeidergutt og statsmann, released in 1983. In 2007 Hans Olav Lahlum released Oscar Torp. En politisk biografi.

Party political offices
Preceded by Emil Stang	Chairman of the Norwegian Labour Party; 1923–1945	Succeeded by Einar Gerhardsen
Political offices
Preceded by Eyvind Getz	Mayor of Oslo; 1935	Succeeded by Trygve Nilsen
Preceded by Trygve Nilsen	Mayor of Oslo; 1936	Succeeded by Trygve Nilsen
Preceded by Adolf Indrebø	Acting Norwegian Minister of Defence; 1935–1936	Succeeded by Fredrik Monsen
Preceded by Kornelius Bergsvik	Norwegian Minister of Social Affairs; 1936–1939	Succeeded by Sverre Støstad
Preceded by Kornelius Bergsvik	Norwegian Minister of Finance; 1939–1942	Succeeded by Paul Hartmann
Preceded by Birger Ljungberg	Norwegian Minister of Defence; 1942–1945 (acting minister: 1941–1942)	Succeeded by Jens Christian Hauge
Preceded by Egil Offenberg	Norwegian Minister of Provisioning and Reconstruction; 1945–1948	Succeeded by Nils Hønsvald
Preceded by Einar Gerhardsen	Prime Minister of Norway; 1951–1955	Succeeded by Einar Gerhardsen
Preceded by Erik Brofoss	Acting Norwegian Minister of Trade and Shipping; June 1954	Succeeded by Nils Langhelle
Preceded by Einar Gerhardsen	President of the Storting; 1955–1958	Succeeded by Nils Langhelle
Civic offices
Preceded by Johannes Gerckens Bassøe	County Governor of Vestfold; 1948–1958 (absent from position, Gerhard Dahl served as acting governor during this time)	Succeeded by Gerhard Dahl
