= Thomas Engelhart =

Norwegian jurist and politician

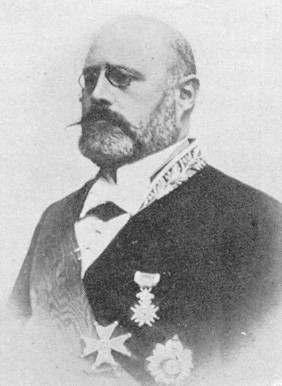
Thomas von Westen Engelhart

Thomas von Westen Engelhart (6 October 1850 – 3 August 1905) was a Norwegian jurist and politician for the Liberal Party.

== Biography ==
He was born in Vinger Municipality in Hedmark county, Norway. He graduated in 1871 with a law degree. Engelhart was a public prosecutor by profession. He was a senior prosecutor at Kongsvinger from 1873. From 1876 he was the Supreme Court Attorney at Vinger, where he also was the mayor between 1881 and 1889.

He was Minister of Auditing from 1891 to 1892, a member of the Council of State Division in Stockholm from 1892 to 1893 and 1897–1898, and then Minister of the Interior from 1895 to 1897. He served as county governor (amtmann) in Bratsberg amt from 1898 to 1902 and then county governor of Jarlsberg og Larvik amt from 1902 until his death in 1905.

His son Bernt (1889–1961) was a veterinarian, and married schoolteacher Alette Nicolaysen who became a national housewives' leader. His daughter Engelke (1885–1973) married ship-owner Wilhelm Wilhelmsen.

Government offices
Preceded by Carl Johan Michelet	County Governor of Jarlsberg og Larvik amt 1902–1905	Succeeded by Ulrik Krohn
Preceded by Otto Benjamin Andreas Aubert	County Governor of Bratsberg amt 1898–1902	Succeeded by Viggo Ullmann
