= Gerhard Dahl =

Governor of Vestfold
- In office 1958–1964
- Preceded by: Oscar Torp
- Succeeded by: Olav Grove

Personal details
- Born: 25 May 1905 Lærdal, Norway
- Died: 1964 (aged 58–59) Norway
- Citizenship: Norway
- Profession: Civil servant

Gerhard Geelmuyden Dahl (1905–1964) was a Norwegian civil servant and government official. He served as the County Governor of Vestfold county from 1958 until his death in 1964.

== Education and career ==
Dahl got his Cand.jur. degree in 1928. From 1929 to 1933 he was hired as a deputy judge in Notodden. From 1933 to 1935 he was the deputy prosecutor in the same town. In 1935, he took a job as a deputy within the office of the County Governor of Vestfold. After World War II in 1945, he became took a leadership role for the whole county government. In 1948, when the new county governor Oscar Torp left the county to serve in the Storting in Oslo, Dahl was named acting county governor in his absence. Torp served in the top levels of government including as Prime Minister of Norway, so he did not return to Vestfold to be county governor. When Torp died in 1958, Dahl was appointed as the new County Governor of Vestfold, a job he held until his death in 1964.

== Personal life ==
He was born in 1905 in Lærdal Municipality, Norway. He was the son of magistrate Gerhard Geelmuyden Dahl (1857–1917) and his wife Kirsti Vold (1875–1952). He was married in 1936 to Erna Dorothea Nergaard (b. 1909).

Government offices
Preceded by Oscar Torp	County Governor of Vestfold; 1958–1964 (acting governor from 1948-1958)	Succeeded by Olav Grove
