= Hans Olav Lahlum =

Norwegian historian, author, chess player and politician

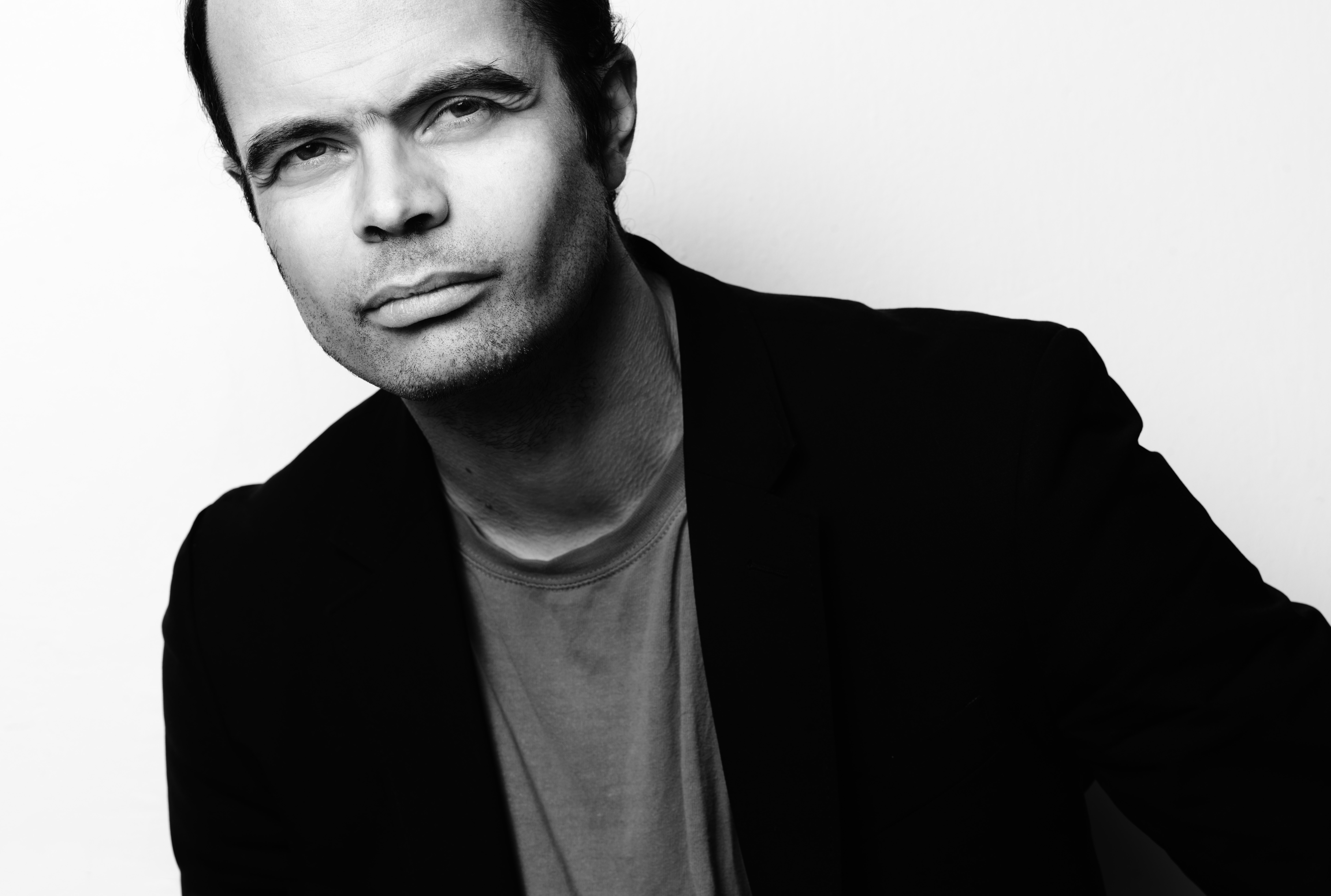
Hans Olav Lahlum

Hans Olav Lahlum (born 12 September 1973) is a Norwegian historian, crime author, chess player and organizer, and politician. He has written biographies on Oscar Torp and Haakon Lie, and a history book about all the Presidents of the United States.

On May 22–23, 2013, he was interviewed by VG for 30 hours, 1 minute and 44 seconds, setting a Guinness World Record for the longest interview ever, beating the previous record by over four hours.

== Career ==
Born in Mo i Rana, Lahlum grew up in Rødøy Municipality, a small community that he did not find enjoyable; he called his own childhood "gloomy". Lahlum finished his cand.philol. degree (master's degree) in history from the University of Oslo in 2002, including subjects in political science and history of religion. Since completing his studies, he has at times been a lecturer and advisor at the Lillehammer University College.

=== Biographies and history books ===
His first biography was a 560-page book on former prime minister Oscar Torp, which was published in 2007. The history book on the US presidents was published in 2008. The biography included regular biographical coverage of each president's policy, but also more "tabloid" coverage about matters such as relationship trouble and drinking habits. The conservative website Minerva credited the book as a good, well-written reference work, finding most of the book to be well balanced. It was more critical of the coverage on George W. Bush, which it found unbalanced.

Lahlum was in contact with the former Labour Party secretary Haakon Lie in the last years of his life, and worked with Hilde Harbo on publishing Lie's book Slik jeg ser det nå in 2008. In 2009 Lahlum published a full 848-page biography on the then late Lie, entitled Haakon Lie. Historien, mytene og mennesket (Haakon Lie, the history, the myths and the person). The book debunked several of the negative rumors surrounding Haakon Lie, including allegations that Lie was a CIA agent. The biography also found that Lie was highly critical of Thorbjørn Jagland, Yngve Hågensen, Trond Giske and Helga Pedersen.

In 2013, Lahlum's biography of Håvard Vederhus (1989-2011) was published. Vederhus was a former leader of the School Student Union of Norway and a Workers' Youth League member who was killed at Utøya during the 2011 Norway Attacks. The book was titled Et kvart liv (literally translated: "A quarter of a life").

=== Crime novels ===
Lahlum published his first crime novel, The Human Flies (In Norwegian: Menneskefluene), in 2010. The next novels in the series were Satellite People (Satelittmenneskene) in 2011 and The Catalyst Killing (Katalysatormordet) in 2012. The novels are written in classical style, take place in the late 1960s, and feature inspector Kolbjørn Kristiansen as the protagonist, assisted by the young and disabled Patricia Louise Borchmann.

=== Politics ===
Politically, Lahlum represents the Socialist Left Party (SV) and became the leader of the county chapter in Oppland in February 2010. He has also served as leader of SV's local chapter in Gjøvik. In the 2017 Norwegian parliamentary election he was their top ballot candidate in Oppland.

=== Chess player and organizer ===
Lahlum is an active chess player with a FIDE rating of 2109 as of May 2022, having been an International Arbiter since 2000. Lahlum played in the top section of the Norwegian Chess Championship in 2001, and was in the sole lead after four rounds, but a string of losses left him at +3=2-4 and 10th place in the end.

Lahlum plays for the chess club in Porsgrunn, and has been captain for his club in team chess events. He is otherwise well known for organizing and arbitrating several tournaments. He was editor of the Norwegian Chess Federation's publication Norsk sjakkblad in 2006. Lahlum's style in organizing tournaments is also original, with round reports featuring a description of every game played, player portraits, and grading each player's performance.

== World record interview ==
In early May 2013, it was announced that Lahlum would cooperate with Norwegian newspaper Verdens Gang in an attempt to set a world record for the longest interview ever made, setting their goal at 30 hours. Interviewing would be experienced journalist and interviewer Mads Andersen.

On May 22 at 11:00, local time, the interview began in the lobby of the newspapers main office in Oslo, with the public allowed to visit and watch the event during the opening hours. It was also shown live on the newspapers own internet television channel, VGTV, where it had more than 370 000 viewers during the broadcast. The following day, at 13:00:05, local time, they beat the previous record, which was 26 hours and 4 seconds, but was set to reach their goal of 30 hours.

On May 23, at 16:01:44 local time, the interview was ended by Andersen, simply saying: "Hans Olav Lahlum, thank you very much for the chat.", having just finished their last topic, US presidential elections from 1912 to 2012. While the new record was first stated to be 30:01:15, it was later made official as 30 hours, 1 minute and 44 seconds, as the digital clock on-screen next to the stage had been started 30 seconds too late after one of the breaks.

During the 30-hour interview the two participants had five minutes of break time allocated for every hour, which they were allowed to save up for longer breaks. They were also served food and beverages at regular intervals, which had been pre-selected by the participants themselves, and were allowed to freely stretch their legs during the interview, as long as they didn't stop talking. The longest pause during the interview, excluding the breaks, was only four seconds.

During the thirty-hour interview, Lahlum covered a vast number of pre-selected topics, including a near five-hour runthrough of all US presidents, and a two-hour runthrough of all US presidential elections since 1912. The interview has since been made available for free viewing in its entirety online. Full interview.

== Style ==
Lahlum is known for his unconventional style, which once included letting his beard grow only on the left side of his face. In chess tournaments, Lahlum has on occasion sported large earmuffs. He has profiled some of this eccentricity in chess tournaments he organizes.
