= Odd Vattekar =

Norwegian politician (1918–1992)

Governor of Vestfold
- In office 1979–1988
- Preceded by: Olav Grove
- Succeeded by: Mona Røkke

Personal details
- Born: 2 January 1918 Vadheim, Norway
- Died: 19 February 1992 (aged 74) Holmestrand, Norway
- Citizenship: Norway
- Profession: Politician

Odd Vattekar (2 January 1918 in Kyrkjebø – 19 February 1992) was a Norwegian politician for the Conservative Party. He was elected to the Norwegian Parliament from Vestfold in 1969, and was re-elected on two occasions, serving until 1981.

On the local level he was a member of the executive committee of the municipal council for Holmestrand Municipality from 1955 to 1962 and again from 1967 to 1971. In 1979, he was appointed County Governor of Vestfold, a position which he held until his retirement in 1988.

Outside politics he spent his entire professional career at the company Nordisk Aluminiumindustri, serving the last three years as director. He fought in the Spanish Civil War. During World War II he fought as a member of the Norwegian resistance movement.

Government offices
Preceded by Olav R. Grove	County Governor of Vestfold; 1979–1988	Succeeded by Mona Røkke
