= Tidemann Flaata Evensen =

Norwegian politician

Tidemann Flaata Evensen (11 July 1905 – 16 September 1969) was a Norwegian politician for the Labour Party. He was elected to the Norwegian Parliament from Telemark in 1945, and was re-elected on one occasion.

Evensen was born in Solum and was a member of the municipal council of Solum Municipality from 1933 to 1947, when he rose to the position of mayor. He held this position until 1959.

After politics, he worked as a bureaucrat in Telemark county, serving as the county governor of Telemark from 1959 to 1969.

Government offices
Preceded by Kornelius Bergsvik	County Governor of Telemark; 1959–1969	Succeeded by Leif Hjørnevik
