= Ulrik Krohn =

Norwegian government official

Ulrik Fredrik Cappelen Krohn

Governor of Jarlsberg og Larvik amt
- In office 1905–1908
- Preceded by: Thomas von Westen Engelhart
- Succeeded by: Abraham Berge

Personal details
- Born: 27 February 1867 Larvik, Norway
- Died: 20 January 1944 (aged 76) Oslo, Norway
- Citizenship: Norway
- Profession: Politician

Ulrik Fredrik Cappelen Krohn (1867-1944) was a Norwegian lawyer and government official.

== Education and career ==
Krohn got his Cand.jur. degree in 1890. In 1894, he was hired as a prosecutor for the Ministry of the Interior. In 1902, he took a new job with the Ministry of Justice. From 1905 to 1908, he was the County Governor of Jarlsberg og Larvik amt. In 1913–1915, he was the city clerk for Larvik. From 1917 to 1918, he worked in the office of the County Governor of Nedenæs amt. In 1919, he was appointed town clerk in Arendal.

== Personal life ==
Ulrik Krohn was born on 27 February 1867 in the town of Larvik. He was the son of Peter Andreas Krohn (born in Ringerike) and his wife, Benedicte Henriette Cappelen (born in Larvik). He was baptized in Langestrand Church. He died in Oslo on 20 January 1944.

Government offices
Preceded by Thomas von Westen Engelhart	County Governor of Jarlsberg og Larvik amt 1905–1908	Succeeded by Abraham Berge
