= Olav Haukvik =

Norwegian politician

Olav Haukvik (26 June 1928 – 22 February 1992) was a Norwegian politician for the Labour Party. He served as the county governor of Telemark from 1973 to 1976. He then served as Minister of Industry from 1978 to 1979.

Government offices
Preceded by Leif Hjørnevik	County Governor of Telemark; 1973–1976	Succeeded by Oddvar Berrefjord
