= Kaland, Austrheim =

Village in Austrheim Municipality, Norway

Kaland
- Village
- Interactive map of Kaland
- Coordinates: 60.80178°N 4.99949°E
- Country: Norway
- Region: Western Norway
- County: Vestland
- District: Nordhordland
- Municipality: Austrheim Municipality

Area
  - Total: 0.95 km^{2} (0.37 sq mi)
- Elevation: 33 m (108 ft)

Population (2025)
  - Total: 467
  - Density: 492/km^{2} (1,270/sq mi)
- Time zone: UTC+01:00 (CET)
  - Summer (DST): UTC+02:00 (CEST)
- Post Code: 5953 Fonnes

Kaland is a village in Austrheim Municipality in Vestland county, Norway. The village is located on the northwestern tip of the mainland Alver peninsula, just west of the Mongstad industrial area.

The 0.95-square-kilometre (230-acre) village has a population (2025) of 467, and a population density of 492 inhabitants per square kilometre (1,270/sq mi).
