= List of county governors of Vestfold og Telemark =

The county governor of Telemark and Vestfold counties in Norway represents the central government administration in the counties. The office of county governor is a government agency of the Kingdom of Norway; the title was Amtmann (before 1919), then Fylkesmann (from 1919 to 2020), and then Statsforvalteren (since 2021).

Vestfold og Telemark county was established on 1 January 2020 after the merger of the Telemark and Vestfold counties. In preparation for the county merger, the Norwegian government merged the offices of the county governor of Vestfold and county governor of Telemark into one agency effective from 1 January 2019. On 1 January 2024, the county of Vestfold og Telemark was disestablished and divided into the separate counties of Telemark and Vestfold as before the initial merger (excluding Svelvik), although keeping the merged county governor agency.

The county governor is the government's representative in the county. The governor carries out the resolutions and guidelines of the Storting and government. This is done first by the county governor performing administrative tasks on behalf of the ministries. Secondly, the county governor also monitors the activities of the municipalities and is the appeal body for many types of municipal decisions.

== Names ==
The title of the office was originally Fylkesmannen i Vestfold og Telemark but on 1 January 2021, the title was changed to the gender-neutral Statsforvalteren i Vestfold og Telemark.

== List of county governors ==
Vestfold og Telemark county has had the following governors:

County governors of Vestfold og Telemark
Start	End	Name
1 January 2019	18 November 2022	Per Arne Olsen (born 1961, died 2022)
18 November 2022	2 September 2024	Fred-Ivar Syrstad (born 1968) (acting governor)
2 September 2024	present	Trond Rønningen (born 1967)

== See also ==
For the county governors of this area prior to 2020, see:

- List of county governors of Telemark
- List of county governors of Vestfold
