= Erling Lae =

Norwegian politician

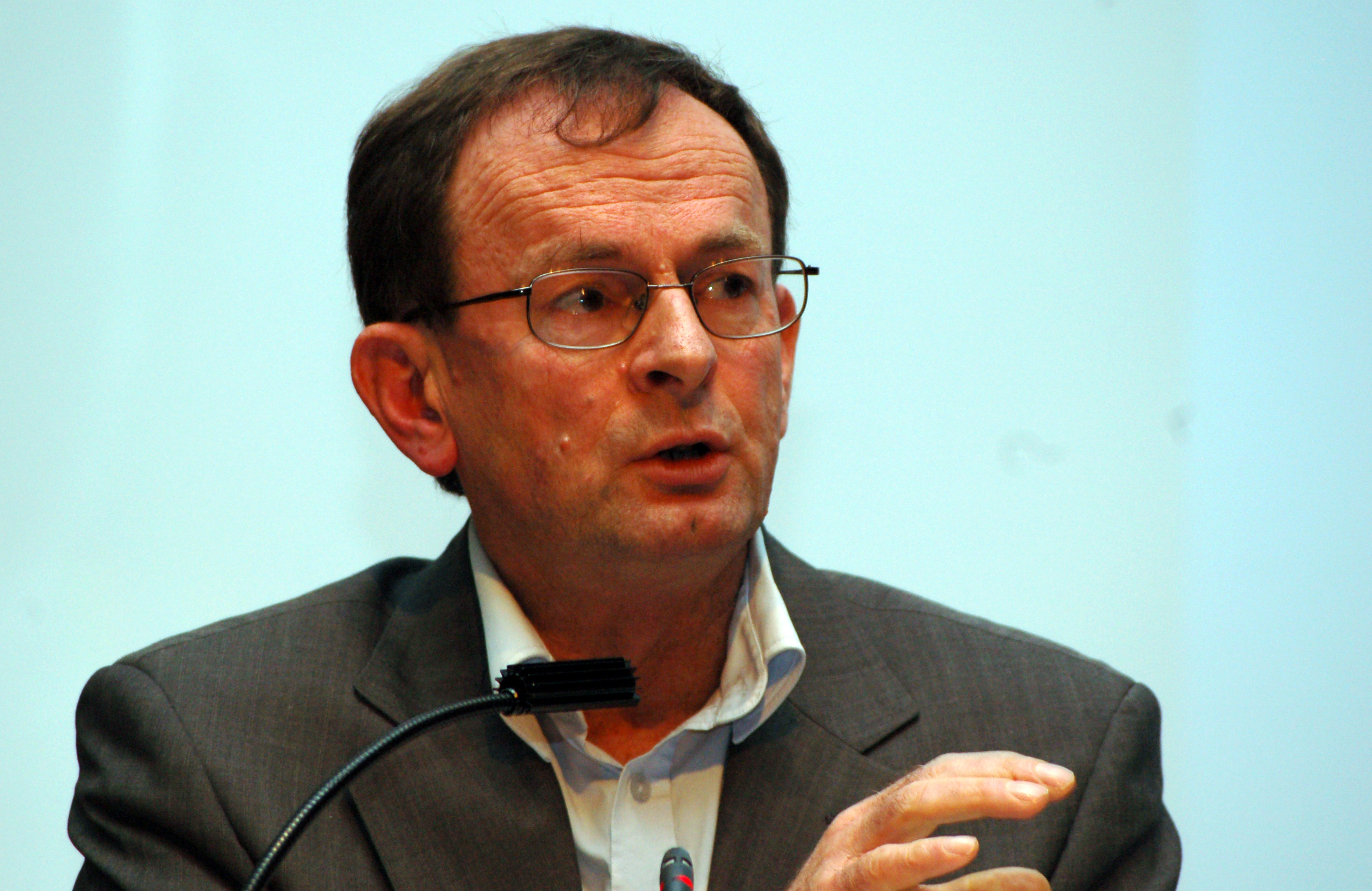
- Lae in 2007

Governor of Vestfold
- In office 1 June 2010 – 30 June 2016
- Monarch: Harald V
- Prime Minister: Jens Stoltenberg; Erna Solberg
- Preceded by: Mona Røkke
- Succeeded by: Per Arne Olsen

Second Deputy Leader of the Conservative Party
- In office 27 April 2008 – 9 May 2010
- Leader: Erna Solberg
- Preceded by: Jan Tore Sanner
- Succeeded by: Bent Høie

Governing Mayor of Oslo
- In office 29 November 2000 – 29 September 2009
- Deputy: Hilde Barstad; Peter N. Myhre; Sylvi Listhaug
- Mayor: Per Ditlev-Simonsen; Svenn Kristiansen; Fabian Stang
- Preceded by: Fritz Huitfeldt
- Succeeded by: Stian Berger Røsland

Oslo City Commissioner of the Elderly and Districts
- In office 15 January 1997 – 29 November 2000
- Governing Mayor: Fritz Huitfeldt
- Preceded by: Torild Lien Utvik
- Succeeded by: Bård Folke Fredriksen

Personal details
- Born: 16 March 1947 (age 79) Oslo, Norway
- Party: Conservative
- Spouse: Jens Torstein Olsen

Erling Lae (born 16 March 1947) is a Norwegian politician for the Conservative Party.

He was born in Oslo, is a cand.philol. by education and formerly worked as a journalist. From 1981 to 1985 he was a political advisor in the Ministry of Consumer Affairs and Administration. He was elected to Oslo city council in 1991, and was a city commissioner between 1997 and 2000. From 2000 to 2009 he was the governing mayor of Oslo. As such he headed the executive branch of the city government in the capital city of Norway.

He was a deputy leader of the Conservative Party from 2008 to 2010. In 2010 he was announced as the new county governor of Vestfold, succeeding Mona Røkke. He was succeeded in June 2016 by second deputy leader of the Progress Party, Per Arne Olsen.

Lae is openly gay, and was named as the most powerful homosexual man in Norway three years in a row by queer website Gaysir, in 2006 through 2008. He is married to Jens Torstein Olsen, a Lutheran minister, with whom he had lived for 26 years before same-sex marriage was legalized in Norway in 2009. In June later that year, Lae and his husband travelled to Vilnius, Lithuania to protest after Vilnius Mayor Vilius Navickas condemned gay pride parades in the city centre, along with the government of Lithuania passing a law banning "homosexual advertising".

Political offices
New creation	Oslo City Commissioner of Senior Citizens and the Boroughs; 1997–2000	Succeeded by Bård Folke Fredriksen
Preceded by Anne Herseth	Oslo City Commissioner of Healthcare; May 2000–June 2000	Succeeded by Ellen Chr. Christiansen
Preceded by Fritz Huitfeldt	Governing mayor of Oslo; 2000–2009	Succeeded by Stian Berger Røsland
Civic offices
Preceded by Mona Røkke	County Governor of Vestfold; 2010–2016	Succeeded by Per Arne Olsen
