= Georg Frederik Hallager =

Georg Frederik Hallager (20 March 1816 – 10 November 1876) was a Dano-Norwegian legal scholar and judge.

He was born in Copenhagen, and migrated to Norway in 1827. He was hired as a university lecturer at the Royal Frederick University in 1841, and was promoted to professor in 1847. He left this position in 1864 to become Supreme Court Assessor.

He was the father of jurist and County Governor Guthorm Hallager.
