= Ole Lysø =

Norwegian politician

Ole Lysø (born 29 April 1940) is a Norwegian labourer, trade unionist and politician for the Labour Party. He was the mayor of Austrheim Municipality.

He was born in Kornstad Municipality as a son of fisher and farmer Alfred Magnar Lysø (1900–1960) and housewife Olianna Sofie Aardal (1898–1978). He finished lower secondary school in 1955, worked at the family farm until 1961, then served his compulsory military service including a stint with UNEF in the Gaza Strip. Then, from 1963 to 1965, he worked and learned the skill of welding at Bergen Mekaniske Verksted. He worked in different factories between 1965 and 1992. From 2000 to 2002 he was a senior manager in the company Vestec.

He was a member of the municipal council of Austrheim Municipality from 1967 to 1979 and 1991 to 2007, serving as mayor from 1991 to 1999 and 2003 to 2007. The intermittent term from 1999 to 2003 was served by Rolf Sandstad. Lysø also served as a deputy representative to the Parliament of Norway from Hordaland during the terms 1977–1981, 1981–1985, 1985–1989 and 1989–1993. In total he met during 139 days of parliamentary session.

Lysø chaired his local party chapter from 1971 to 1989 and 1990 to 1994, and was a central committee member of the Labour Party from 1989 to 1992. He held positions in the Norwegian Union of Iron and Metalworkers and in the Norwegian Confederation of Trade Unions. He chaired the local branch of the Norwegian Labour Inspection Authority from 1971 to 1975, was deputy chair of the municipal school board from 1980 to 1988, chaired Regionrådet for Nordhordaland og Gulen from 1994 to 2000, and was a board member of Bergen University College from 1992 to 1997.
