= Jørgen Hustad =

Norwegian newspaper editor and politician (1896–1978)

Jørgen Ludolf Pedersen Hustad (29 January 1896 – 31 May 1978) was a Norwegian newspaper editor and politician for the Labour Party.

He was born in Gildeskål Municipality as a son of laborer Petter Hustad (1856–1947) and Helene Sofie Jensen (1859–1933). He attended business school, and worked as a laborer in Narvik from 1910 to 1914. He married in 1916.

In 1915, he was hired as manager of the newspaper Nordlys, soon advancing to editor-in-chief. In 1917 he was hired in the Halden office of Smaalenenes Socialdemokrat. He moved on to Østfold Arbeiderblad and was the editor-in-chief of that newspaper from 1922 to 1927. As editor he was sentenced to 90 days of light detention for encouraging the 1924 military strike. He was a member of the municipal council of Halden Municipality from 1923 to 1928, and deputy mayor in 1928.

After running a business in Kristiansand from 1929 to 1934, and then returned to Smaalenenes Socialdemokrat as editor-in-chief from 1935 to 1942. After the Second World War the newspaper resurfaced again, with the name Demokraten and with Jørgen Hustad as editor in 1945. From 1950 he was the co-editor of Bergens Arbeiderblad; from 1958 the sole editor. He left the editor's chair in 1959, but continued as a journalist until his retirement. He was a member of the municipal council of Fredrikstad Municipality from 1938 to 1949 and the municipal council of Bergen Municipality from 1952 to 1967. He chaired Bergen Port Authority from 1965 to 1967. He continued campaigning politically after his 75th birthday, among others as an activist for the proposed Norwegian European Communities membership in 1972.

He died in 1978. His daughter married Erik Ribu.

Media offices
Preceded by Torstein Selvik (co-editor until 1958)	Chief editor of Bergens Arbeiderblad; 1950–1959	Succeeded by Per Bratland
