= Guthorm Hallager =

Guthorm Immanuel Hallager

Governor of Telemark
- In office 1910–1932

Personal details
- Born: 9 April 1864 Christiania, Norway
- Died: 27 May 1932 (aged 68) Norway
- Citizenship: Norway
- Parent: Georg Frederik Hallager (father)
- Profession: Lawyer

Guthorm Hallager (1864-1932) was a Norwegian civil servant and lawyer. He served as the County Governor of Telemark county from 1910 until 1932. He was the son of law professor and Supreme Court judge Georg Frederik Hallager.

Hallager received his cand.jur. degree in 1886. In 1888, he became deputy magistrate and later became the town clerk in Kragerø. He was then employed in the Ministry of Justice in 1889. In 1894, he was named a royal plenipotentiary. From 1895 to 1898 he was Norwegian secretary in the third union committee. Hallager was appointed county governor for Telemark county from 1910 to 1932 (the county was named Bratsberg from 1910 to 1918). He was a knight of the first class of the Order of St. Olav.

Hallager became friends with Alexander Kielland after the town fire in Ålesund. They corresponded with each other from September 1904 to February 1906. Some of the letters between them were recorded in the book, Amtmanden og Expeditionschefen : brev fra Alexander L. Kielland til Guthorm Hallager.

Government offices
Preceded by Viggo Ullmann	County Governor of Telemark; 1910–1932	Succeeded by Olaf Hegland
