= Fosnøyna =

Island in Vestland county, Norway

Fosnøyna Fosnøy (unofficial)
- Interactive map of Fosnøyna; Fosnøy (unofficial)

Geography
- Location: Vestland, Norway
- Coordinates: 60.7958°N 4.8715°E
- Area: 26.3 km^{2} (10.2 sq mi)
- Length: 10.7 km (6.65 mi)
- Width: 4.7 km (2.92 mi)
- Highest elevation: 56 m (184 ft)
- Highest point: Bredvikvarden

Administration
- Norway
- County: Vestland
- Municipality: Austrheim Municipality

Fosnøyna is an island in Austrheim Municipality in Vestland county, Norway. The 26.3-square-kilometre (10.2 sq mi) island makes up the majority of the land area of the municipality. The island is located east of the Fedjefjorden and south of the Fensfjorden. The island of Radøy lies just south of Fosnøyna and the mainland of the Lindås peninsula lies immediately to the east of Fosnøyna.

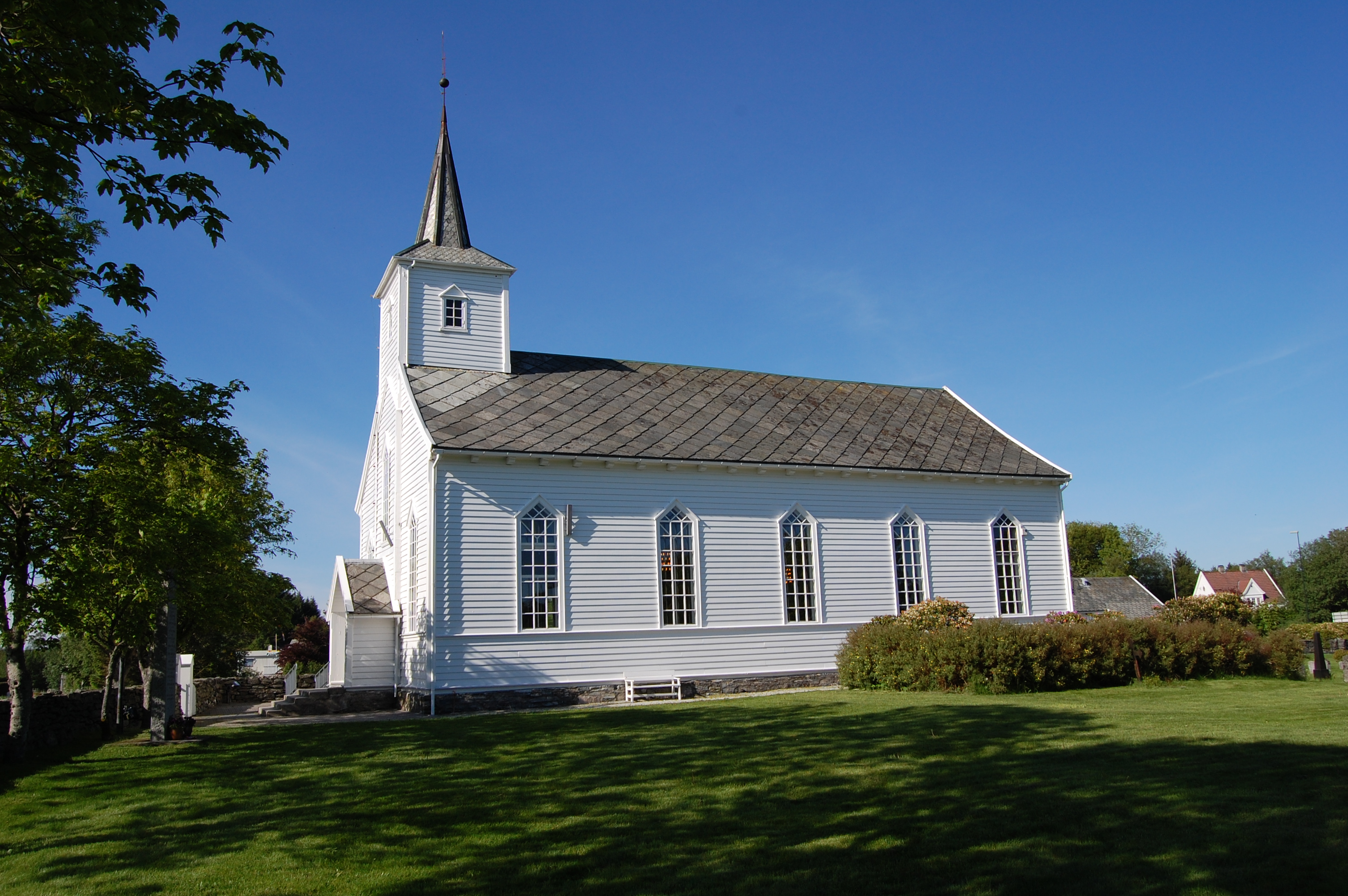
Austrheim Church

The highest point on the island is the 56-metre (184 ft) high Bredvikvarden. The island has some trees on it, but the northern part is fairly barren and rocky while the southern part is more marshy. There are two larger villages on the island: the village of Austrheim and the municipal centre of Årås.

The island is connected to the mainland road network by two bridges. A series of small bridges connects Fosnøyna to the mainland of Alver Municipality, west of Mongstad and the other connects the south end of Fosnøyna to the island of Radøy (which in turn is connected to the mainland.

== See also ==
- List of islands of Norway
