= Trygve Nilsen =

Norwegian civil servant and Mayor of Oslo

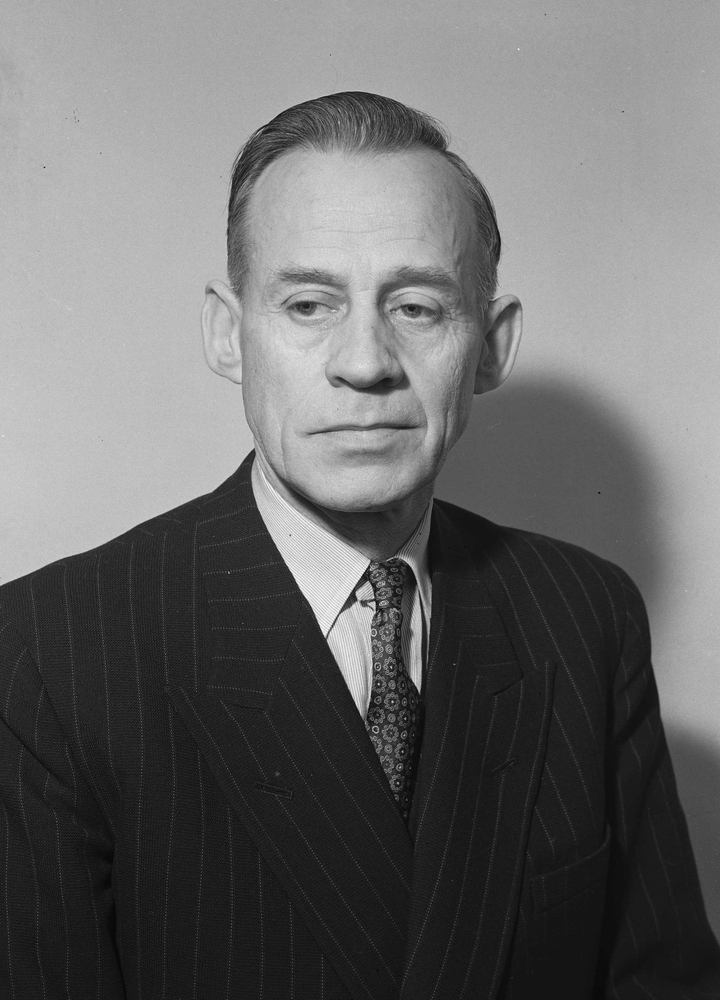
Trygve Nilsen (1893–1973)

Trygve Nilsen (26 August 1893 – 5 October 1973) was a Norwegian civil servant and Mayor of Oslo with the Labour Party.

== Biography ==
He was born in Kristiania (now Oslo), Norway. He was the son of Nils Nilsen (1856-1941) and Eli Johannessen (1858-1929). After training at technical evening school, Nilsen worked as a mason from 1909 to 1929. He was a member of Oslo city council from 1926 to 1940, serving as Mayor from 1935 to 1936 and 1936 to 1940. He was then the Oslo chief administrative officer of housing from 1940 until he retired in 1959. Nilsen was central in the work of the social housing construction in Oslo in the interwar period, and has often been described as the father of the Oslo Housing and Savings Society (Oslo Bolig og Sparelag).

Political offices
Preceded by Oscar Torp	Mayor of Oslo; 1935–1936	Succeeded by Oscar Torp
Preceded by Oscar Torp	Mayor of Oslo; 1936–1940	Succeeded by Einar Gerhardsen
