= Torstein Selvik =

Norwegian politician

Torstein Selvik (8 October 1900 – 10 September 1983) was a Norwegian politician for the Labour Party.

He was born in Haus Municipality. Despite being almost 40 years old at the time, Selvik fought in the 1940 Norwegian Campaign with the 4th Brigade in Valdres.

He was elected to the Norwegian Parliament from Bergen in 1950, and was re-elected on four occasions.

Media offices
Preceded by vacancy during World War II	Chief editor of Bergens Arbeiderblad; 1945–1958	Succeeded by Jørgen Hustad (co-editor from 1950)
