= Per Bratland =

Norwegian newspaper editor (1907–1988)

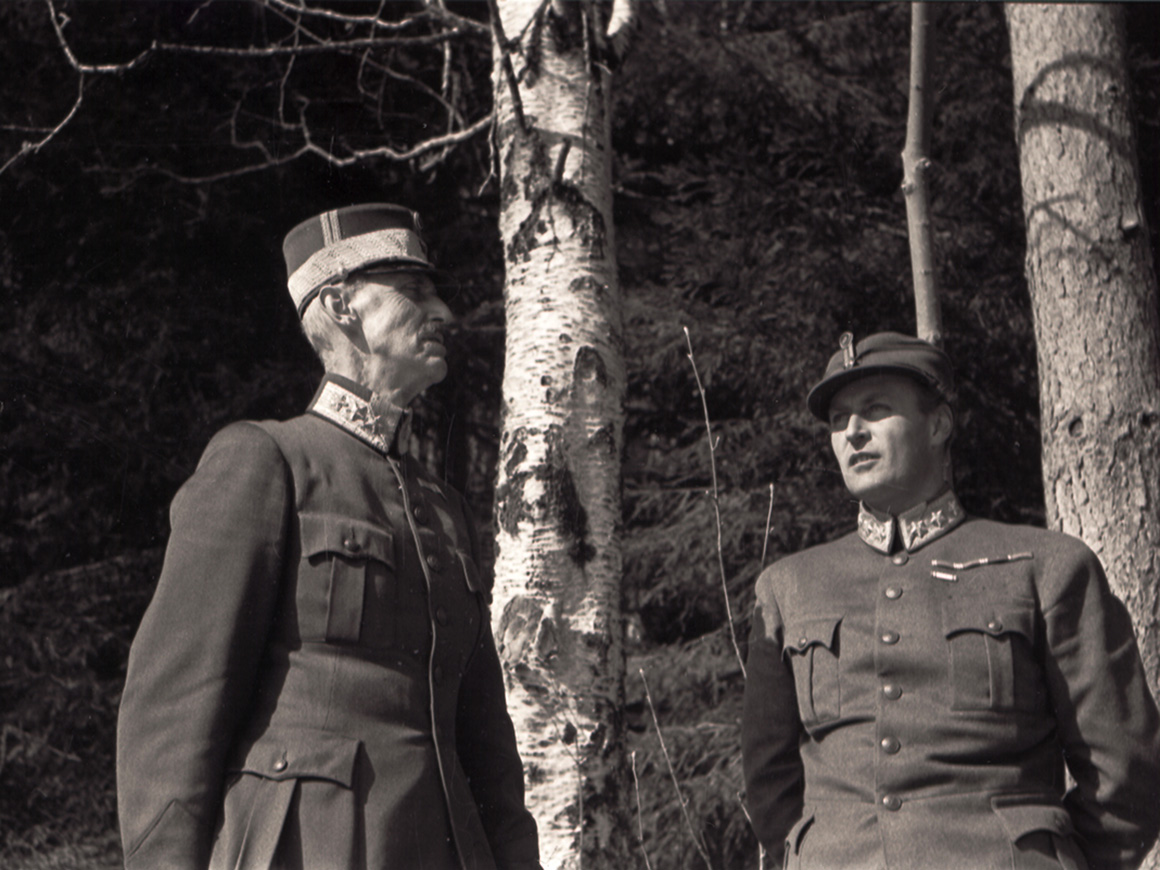
Per Bratland's iconic photograph of King Haakon VII and Crown Prince Olav seeking shelter under the birch tree during a German bombing raid in April 1940

Per Bratland (September 8, 1907 – April 9, 1988) was a Norwegian newspaper editor.

Born in Oslo, he started out as a photo reporter for the Drammen newspaper Fremtiden in 1927. He became the editor-in-chief of Tiden in 1934, and a journalist in Arbeiderbladet in 1936. He covered the arrival of Adolf Hitler in Vienna in March 1938, and the Nazi annexation of Austria, as news reporter, escaping to Tsjekkoslovakia by taxi, with his undeveloped film hidden in the petrol tank.

When the occupation of Norway by Nazi Germany started in 1940, Arbeiderbladet was shut down. Escaping the invasion army, Bratland took a famous photo of king Haakon VII and crown prince Olav, hiding in the birch forest in Molde, under a bombing raid by German airplanes. He escaped Aalesund by sea to Bodø, crossed the border to Sweden on ski, and presented his news photos from the war in Norway in Stockholm. His story and the photographs he presented there of bombed Norwegian cities, contradicted the impression created by German media, of a peaceful occupation. He returned to Norway through Finland, but arriving in Oslo, the Nazi administration blacklisted him from work as a journalist. Later that year, Bratland fled the country again, and worked at the press office of the Norwegian legation in Stockholm from 1940 to 1941 and in London from 1941 to 1945.

After the war he created and edited the magazine Aktuell from 1945 to 1956. He then worked in Arbeiderbladet from 1956 to 1975, except for the years 1959 to 1961, when he was the editor-in-chief of Bergens Arbeiderblad. He published several books in Norwegian: Hvem har makt i Norge (1965), Bratteli tenker høyt (1968) and Er vi slik? (1971).

Media offices
| Preceded by Jørgen Hustad | Chief editor of Bergens Arbeiderblad; 1959–1961 | Succeeded by Egil Helle |
