= Kornelius Bergsvik =

Norwegian politician (1889–1975)

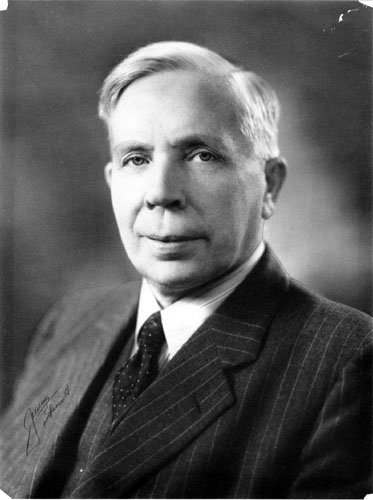

County Governor of Telemark
- In office 1939–1959
- Prime Minister: Johan Nygaardsvold; Einar Gerhardsen; Oscar Torp
- Preceded by: Didrik Cappelen (acting)
- Succeeded by: Tidemann Flaata Evensen

Minister of Finance
- In office 13 November 1936 – 1 July 1939
- Prime Minister: Johan Nygaardsvold
- Preceded by: Adolf Indrebø
- Succeeded by: Oscar Torp

Minister of Social Affairs
- In office 20 March 1935 – 13 November 1936
- Prime Minister: Johan Nygaardsvold
- Preceded by: Trygve Utheim
- Succeeded by: Oscar Torp

Member of the Norwegian Parliament
- In office 1 January 1928 – 4 December 1945
- Constituency: Hordaland

Personal details
- Born: Kornelius Olai Person Bergsvik; 18 March 1889 Austrheim, Søndre Bergenhus, Sweden-Norway
- Died: 2 May 1975 (aged 86) Austrheim, Hordaland, Norway
- Party: Labour
- Spouse: Berte Margrethe Selvik (m. 1925)

Kornelius Olai Person Bergsvik (18 March 1889 – 2 May 1975) was a Norwegian politician for the Labour Party, born in Austrheim, Søndre Bergenhus. Bergsvik represented Hordaland in the Norwegian Parliament from 1928 to 1945. In 1936 he was appointed to the Nygaardsvold Cabinet. Bergsvik served as Minister of Social Affairs 1935–1936, and Minister of Finance 1936–1939. After resigning from the government in 1939, he was County Governor of Telemark from 1939 to 1940, and again from 1945 to 1959.

Government offices
Preceded by Olaf Hegland	County Governor of Telemark; 1939–1959 (From 1940-1945, Christen Knudsen Jr. was appointed to the position during the German occupation of Norway)	Succeeded by Tidemann F. Evensen
