= Per Arne Olsen =

Norwegian politician (1961–2022)

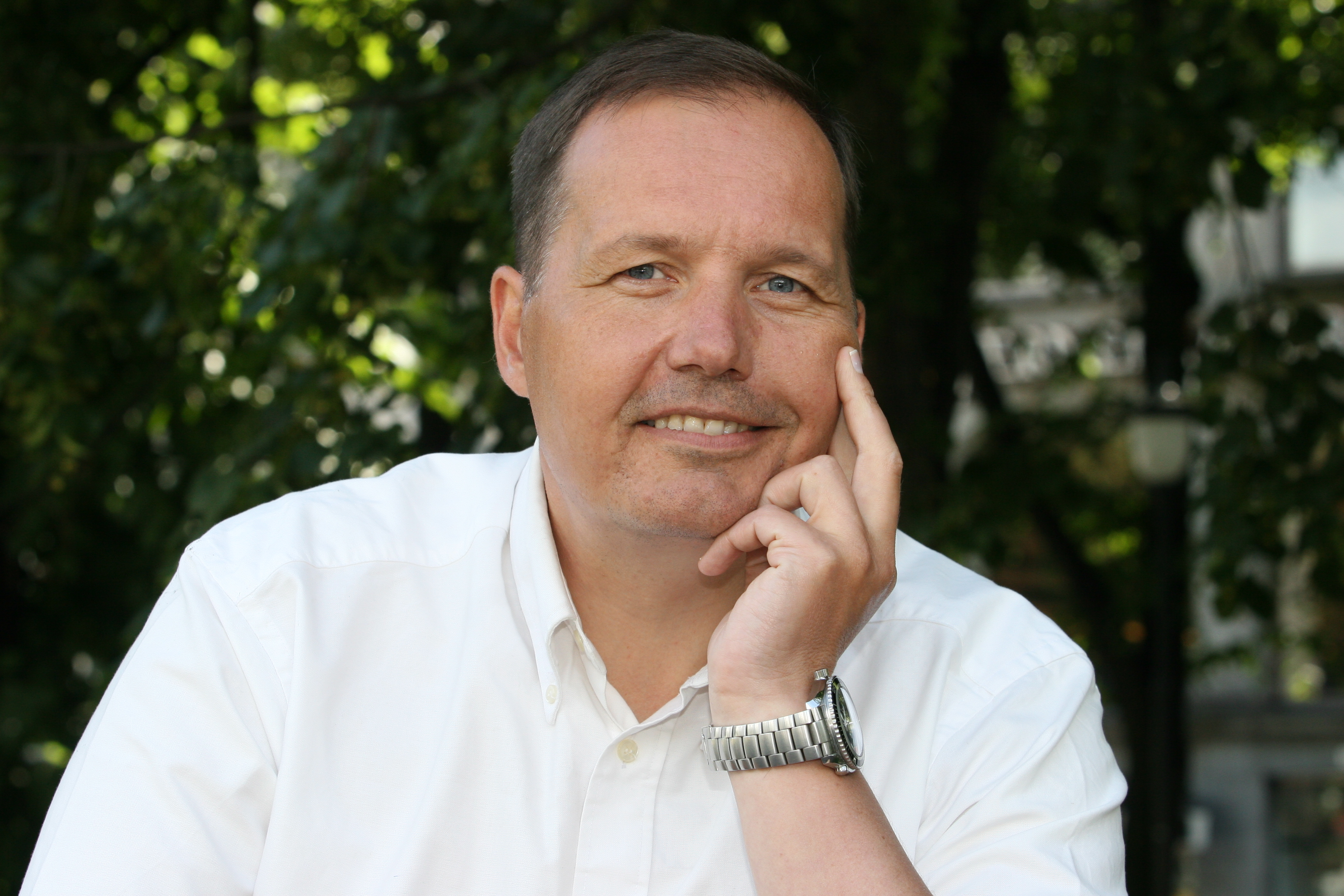

Governor of Vestfold og Telemark
- In office 1 January 2019 – 18 November 2022
- Monarch: Harald V
- Prime Minister: Erna Solberg; Jonas Gahr Støre
- Preceded by: Position established
- Succeeded by: Fred-Ivar Syrstad (acting)

Governor of Vestfold
- In office 30 June 2016 – 31 December 2018
- Monarch: Harald V
- Prime Minister: Erna Solberg
- Preceded by: Erling Lae
- Succeeded by: Position abolished, merged with Telemark

Mayor of Tønsberg Municipality
- In office 1 June 2003 – 30 September 2009
- Preceded by: Harald Haug Andersen
- Succeeded by: Petter Berg

Second Deputy Leader of the Progress Party
- In office 22 May 2005 – 26 May 2013
- Leader: Carl I. Hagen; Siv Jensen
- Preceded by: John Alvheim
- Succeeded by: Ketil Solvik-Olsen

Personal details
- Born: 21 February 1961 Tønsberg, Vestfold, Norway
- Died: 18 November 2022 (aged 61)
- Party: Progress
- Occupation: Politician

Per Arne Lodding Olsen (21 February 1961 – 18 November 2022) was a Norwegian politician who served as a Member of Parliament for the Progress Party, where he held the position as second deputy leader. He served as the governor of Vestfold from 2016 to 2019, and from 2019 until his death was the Governor of Vestfold og Telemark, elected by the King-in-Council. While Vestfold and Telemark merged on 1 January 2020, the office of the Governor was merged a year before, on 1 January 2019.

Olsen served as a deputy Member of Parliament to the Norwegian Parliament from Vestfold from 2001 to 2009. He was also the mayor of Tønsberg Municipality from 2003 until 2009, when he became a Member of Parliament.

Olsen died on 18 November 2022, at the age of 61.

Government offices
Preceded by Erling Lae	County Governor of Vestfold; 2016–2018	Office abolished Merged into County Governor of Vestfold og Telemark
New creation	County Governor of Vestfold og Telemark; 2019–2022	Succeeded by Fred-Ivar Syrstad (acting governor)
