= Leif Hjørnevik =

Norwegian civil servant and politician

Governor of Telemark
- In office 1970–1973

Personal details
- Born: 16 June 1910 Voss Municipality, Norway
- Died: 13 June 1973 (aged 62) Norway
- Citizenship: Norway
- Profession: Politician

Leif Hjørnevik (1910–1973) was a Norwegian civil servant and politician. He served as the County Governor of Telemark county from December 1969 until his death in 1973.

Leif Hjørnevik received his Cand.jur. degree in 1936. He then became a solicitor before starting his own legal practice. From 1939 to 1941 he was a deputy judge. He was employed in the Ministry of Finance, the Ministry of the Interior, and the Ministry of Justice during the Second World War. In 1945, he got a job as a manager in the Nordland county government. The following year, he moved to Larvik Municipality where be became the leader of the county government there, a position he held until 1959. This was followed by ten years as the finance manager for Trondheim Municipality. On 12 December 1969, he was appointed as the county governor of Telemark. In late 1972, he had become ill and went on leave from his job in the fall of 1972. He died on 13 June 1973.

Government offices
Preceded by Tidemann F. Evensen	County Governor of Telemark; Dec 1969 – June 1973	Succeeded by Olav Haukvik
