= Årås =

Village in Austrheim Municipality, Norway

- Village
- Interactive map of Årås
- Coordinates: 60.77719°N 4.93257°E
- Country: Norway
- Region: Western Norway
- County: Vestland
- District: Nordhordland
- Municipality: Austrheim Municipality

Area
  - Total: 0.67 km^{2} (0.26 sq mi)
- Elevation: 24 m (79 ft)

Population (2025)
  - Total: 616
  - Density: 919/km^{2} (2,380/sq mi)
- Time zone: UTC+01:00 (CET)
  - Summer (DST): UTC+02:00 (CEST)
- Post Code: 5943 Austrheim

Årås is the administrative centre of Austrheim Municipality in Vestland county, Norway. The village is located in the central part of the island of Fosnøyna, about 2 kilometres (1.2 mi) northeast of the village of Austrheim.

The 0.67-square-kilometre (170-acre) village has a population (2025) of 616 and a population density of 919 inhabitants per square kilometre (2,380/sq mi).
