= Olaf Hegland =

Governor of Telemark
- In office 1933–1938

Personal details
- Born: 17 January 1885 Arendal, Norway
- Died: 10 January 1939 (aged 53) Norway
- Citizenship: Norway
- Party: Liberal Party
- Profession: Politician

Olaf Hegland (1885–1939) was a Norwegian civil servant and lawyer. He served as the County Governor of Telemark county from 1933 until 1938.

In 1908, Hegland passed his legal civil service examination. In 1922, he became a lawyer. In 1910, he was hired as deputy public prosecutor and deputy city bailiff in Kristiansand. In 1913, he started working with the magistrate in Vest-Telemark. Also in 1913, he started working as an attorney with lawyer Didrik Cappelen in Kviteseid. In 1916, he became a partner in Cappelen's law firm, which he completely took over in 1918. In Kviteseid, Hegland was also involved in local politics for the Liberal Party. He was a member of the municipal council of Kviteseid Municipality. In 1929, he was elected mayor of Kviteseid. In 1932, Hegland was appointed county governor of Telemark. He retired from the job in 1938 and died in January 1939.

Government offices
Preceded by Guthorm Hallager	County Governor of Telemark; 1933–1938	Succeeded by Kornelius Bergsvik
