= Biblioteksentralen =

Partner and service supplier for Norwegian public and school libraries

The Library Center
- Biblioteksentralen
- 59.93400738428406°N 10.831979952168124°E
- Location: Oslo, Norway
- Type: Public library
- Established: 1952

Other information
- Website: www.bibsent.no

Biblioteksentralen AL is a library center for public libraries in Norway, with offices in Oslo. It is the primary supplier of books, equipment and services to these libraries.

Libraries make use of Biblioteksentralen's centralized library catalog system, BIBBI. It contains 170,000 bibliographic records, with 11,000 records added each year. A simplified version of the MARC21/NORMARC format is used, called BSMARC.

Biblioteksentralen is cooperatively owned (the "AL" suffix to the name means andelslag or cooperatively held corporation) by 425 municipalities, 14 counties, the Norwegian Association of Local and Regional Authorities, and the Norwegian Library Association. It was established in this form in February 1952 after a government resolution in the previous year, but its predecessor Folkeboksamlingenes Ekspedisjon had been around since 1902. As of 2006, the corporation has 56 employees and a turnover of 99 million kr with a profit from operations of 2 million.

== See also ==
- National Library of Norway
- Bibsys
