= List of county governors of Telemark =

The County Governor of Telemark (Norwegian: Fylkesmann i Telemark) was the county governor for Telemark county in Norway from 1661 until the office was abolished in 2019. The office of county governor is a government agency of the Kingdom of Norway which represents the national government in each county. The county governor is an appointed position. On 1 January 2019, this office was merged with the County Governor of Vestfold into the County Governor of Vestfold og Telemark (this was done in preparation for the merger of the two counties in 2020).

The governor is the government's representative in the county. They carry out the resolutions and guidelines of the Storting and government. This is done first by the county governor, who performs administrative tasks on behalf of the ministries. Secondly, the county governor also monitors the activities of the municipalities and is the appeal body for many types of municipal decisions.

== History ==
In 1661, the government of Norway established Bratsberg as an amt (or county). The county was subordinate to the Diocesan Governor of Christianssand. In 1919, the name of the county was changed to Telemark fylke. On 1 January 2019, the office was merged creating the new office of County Governor of Vestfold og Telemark in preparation for the merger of the neighboring counties of Telemark and Vestfold to form Vestfold og Telemark county on 1 January 2020.

== Title ==
The word for county (amt or fylke) and the name of the county have both changed over time. Therefore the title of the officeholder has also changed.

- From 1661 until 31 December 1918, the title for each officeholder was Amtmann i Bratsberg amt.
- From 1 January 1919 to 1 January 2019, the title for each officeholder was Fylkesmann i Telemark.

== List of officeholders ==
Telemark county has had the following governors:

County governors of Telemark
Start	End	Name
1661	1662	Jørgen Bjelke (1621–1696)
13 Apr 1662	16 Jun 1669	Johan Frederik von Marschalck (1618–1679)
16 Jun 1669	15 Nov 1675	Preben von Ahnen (1606–1675)
15 Nov 1675	26 Sep 1691	Niels Sørensen Adeler (1628–1694)
26 Sep 1691	20 Apr 1711	Henrik Adeler (1660–1718)
20 Apr 1711	2 Dec 1723	Jacob Lindberg (1672–1723)
12 Aug 1724	3 Jan 1727	Michael Storm (1688–1727)
27 Jan 1727	21 Mar 1731	Christian Berg (1697–1731)
9 Apr 1731	30 Jan 1744	Henrik Essemann (????–1744)
1744	4 July 1764	Johan Frederik Brockenhuus von Løwenhielm (1706–1764)
30 Jul 1764	20 Feb 1771	Frederik Georg Adeler (1736–1810)
20 Feb 1771	3 Apr 1773	Peter Holm (1733–1817)
3 Apr 1773	2 Apr 1781	Frederik Georg Adeler (1736–1810)
2 Apr 1781	9 Jan 1788	Frederik Moltke (1754–1836)
12 Mar 1788	10 Jan 1798	Jonas Ramus Petersen (1748–1804)
7 Mar 1798	26 Feb 1800	Otto Joachim Moltke (1770–1853)
26 Feb 1800	27 Apr 1803	Jens Andreas Selmer (1776–1830)
27 Apr 1803	24 Dec 1813	Severin Løvenskiold (1777–1856)
24 Dec 1813	1838	Fredrik Wilhelm Wedel-Jarlsberg (1787–1863)
1839	1846	Carl Valentin Falsen (1787–1852)
1846	1877	Hans J. C. Aall (1806–1894)
1877	1880	Nils Mathias Rye (1824–1905)
1881	1889	Ulrik Frederik Christian Arneberg (1829–1911)
1889	1898	Otto Benjamin Andreas Aubert (1841–1898)
1898	1902	Thomas von Westen Engelhart (1850–1905)
1902	1910	Viggo Ullmann (1848–1910)
1910	1932	Guthorm Hallager (1864–1932)
1933	1938	Olaf Hegland (1885–1939)
1939	1959	Kornelius Bergsvik (1889–1975); Removed from office 1940-1945 during the occupied government.
Oct 1940	1945	Christen Knudsen Jr. (1873–1964) (WWII Occupied government)
1959	Dec 1969	Tidemann F. Evensen (1905–1969)
Dec 1969	1973	Leif Hjørnevik (1910–1973)
1973	1976	Olav Haukvik (1928–1992)
1976	1987	Oddvar Berrefjord (1918–1999)
1987	1998	Kjell Bohlin (1928–2011)
1 Dec 1998	1 July 2004	Solveig Sollie (born 1939)
2 July 2004	2 July 2006	Arne Malme (born 1949) (Acting governor)
3 July 2006	21 June 2018	Kari Nordheim-Larsen (born 1948)
22 June 2018	31 Dec 2018	Arne Malme (born 1949) (Acting governor)
Office abolished on 1 January 2019, see List of county governors of Vestfold og Telemark
