= Johan Henrik Rye =

Norwegian politician

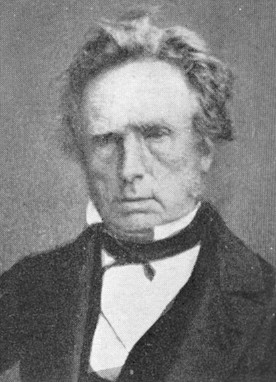
Johan Henrik Rye.

Johan Henrik Rye (1 November 1787 – 14 July 1868) was a Norwegian military officer, jurist and elected official.

== Biography ==
Johan Henrik Rye attended the Norwegian Military College and graduated in 1812. From 1809 to 1814, he served as an officer in the Copenhagen Infantry Regiment (Københavns infanteriregiment).

He served as County Governor of Jarlsbergs og Laurvigs amt (now Vestfold) from 1829 to 1833. He was then appointed assessor at the Supreme Court. In 1834 he was named to a committee which prepared the formannskap laws in Norway, introducing local governance in the country.

He was elected to the Norwegian Parliament from the constituency Christiania in 1836, and was re-elected in 1839, 1842 and 1845. From 1836 to 1837 he served as President of the Storting, together with Søren A. W. Sørenssen.

== Personal life ==
Johan Henrik Rye was one of the sons of Matthias Andreas Rye (1793–1860) and Elisabeth Johanne Lind. His father was a captain and battalion manager of the Telemark Infantry Regiment (Telemarkens Infanteriregiment). His brother was Danish major-general Olaf Rye (1791–1849).

Johan Henrik Rye married Jacobine "Bina" Ulrica Alstrup (1784–1851). Their daughter Thale Cathrine Rye (1820–1900) married later Councillor of State Niels Mathias Rye (1824–1905).

Rye was appointed a knight of the Order of St. Olav in 1847 and promoted to commander in 1867. He died during 1868 and was buried at Vår Frelsers gravlund in Oslo.

Political offices
Preceded by Georg Jacob Bull	County Governor of Jarlsberg og Laurvig amt 1829–1833	Succeeded by Ulrik Frederik Cappelen
Preceded by Hans Riddervold; Søren A. W. Sørenssen	President of the Storting; 1836–1837	Succeeded by Hans Riddervold; Søren A. W. Sørenssen
