= Odd Kallerud =

Norwegian politician

Odd Kallerud (20 July 1926 – 27 April 2016) was a Norwegian politician for the Conservative Party.

He was born in Kongsberg in July 1926 as a son of farmer and butcher Eivind Kallerud (1903–1966) and housewife Margit, née Finnerud (1902–1976). He finished secondary education in 1945, commerce school in 1946 and Värmland Vocational School in 1951.

He started his political career in Kongsberg city council from 1975 to 1987, serving as mayor from 1982 to 1983. He was also a member of Buskerud county council from 1979 to 1991. He chaired the local party chapter for some time.

He was elected as a deputy representative to the Parliament of Norway from Buskerud in 1977, and was re-elected as such in 1985 after a four-year hiatus. For two weeks in 1985 he met regularly in Parliament, filling in for Mona Røkke who was a part of Willoch's First Cabinet. In total he was present during 1 year and 77 days of parliamentary session.

In local banking, he was a supervisory council member of Sandsvær Sparebank from 1964 to 1974 and board member from 1974 to 1985. From 1983 to 1988 he chaired the Norwegian Savings Banks Association. He was also a board member of Landsvær e-verk from 1961 to 1979 (chair since 1972), Buskerud Kraftverk from 1980 to 1989 (deputy chair from 1984 to 1987) and Fylkeskraft-Østlandet for four years. Kallerud died in April 2016 at the age of 89.
