= Austrheim Church =

Church in Vestland, Norway

- Austrheim kyrkje
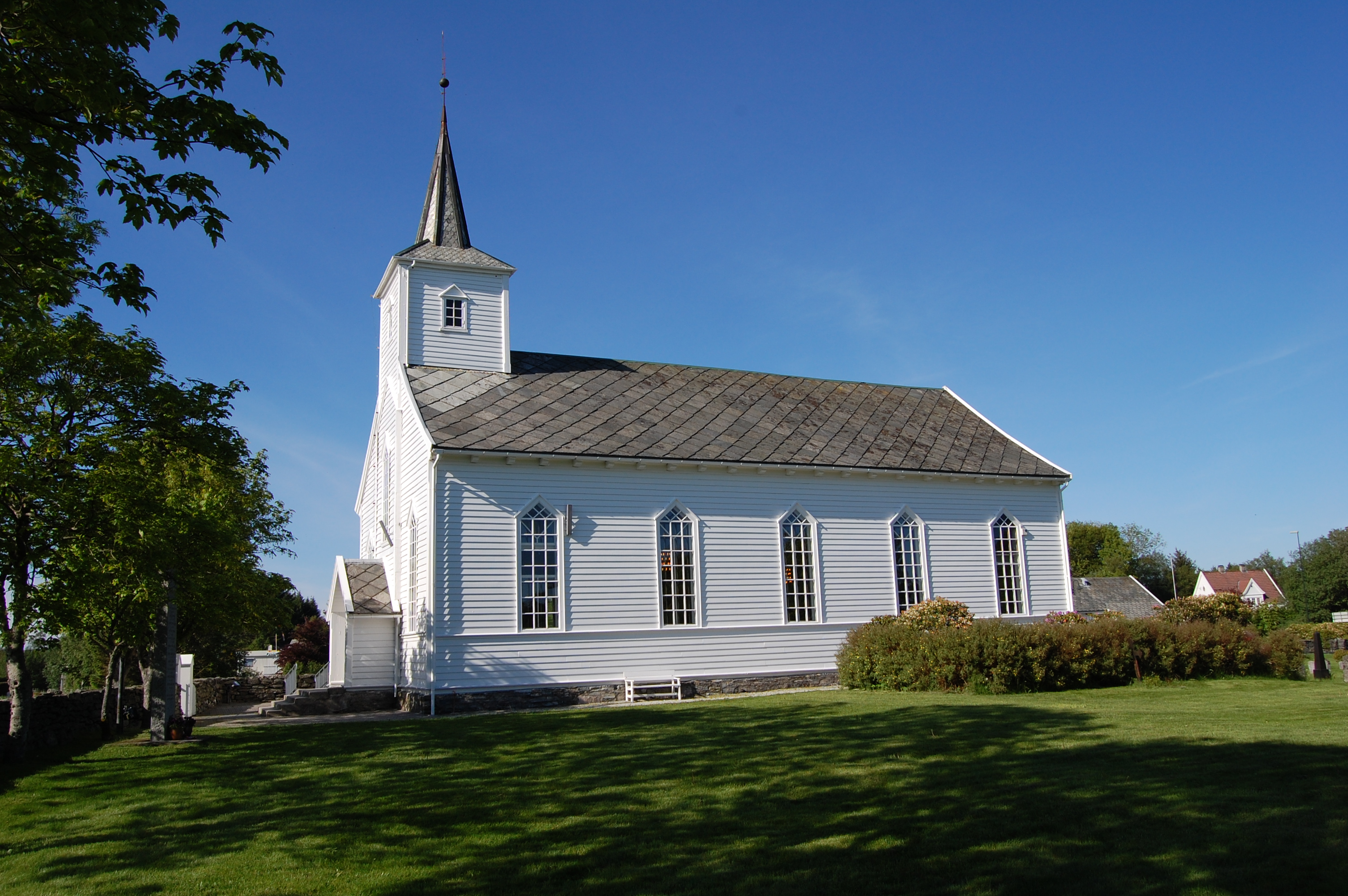
- View of the church
- Austrheim Church
- 60°45′50″N 4°54′57″E
- Location: Austrheim Municipality, Vestland
- Country: Norway
- Denomination: Church of Norway
- Previous denomination: Catholic Church
- Churchmanship: Evangelical Lutheran

History
- Status: Parish church
- Founded: 13th century
- Consecrated: 2 April 1865

Architecture
- Functional status: Active
- Architect: Askild Åse
- Architectural type: Long church
- Completed: 1865 (161 years ago)

Specifications
- Capacity: 355
- Materials: Wood

Administration
- Diocese: Bjørgvin bispedømme
- Deanery: Nordhordland prosti
- Parish: Austrheim
- Norwegian Cultural Heritage Site
- Type: Church
- Status: Not protected
- ID: 83830

Austrheim Church (Norwegian: Austrheim kyrkje) is a parish church of the Church of Norway in Austrheim Municipality in Vestland county, Norway. It is located in the village of Austrheim on the island of Fosnøyna. It is the church for the Austrheim parish which is part of the Nordhordland prosti (deanery) in the Diocese of Bjørgvin. The white, wooden church was built in a long church design in 1865 using plans drawn up by the architect Askild Åse. The church seats about 355 people.

== History ==
The earliest existing historical records of the church date back to the year 1329, but it was not built that year. The first church was a wooden stave church that was likely built during the 13th century. That old church was replaced by a log church during the early 1600s. On 16 November 1710, the church tower was badly damaged by lightning and major repairs were carried out afterwards to repair the tower and its supporting structures. In 1865, a new church was built about 30 metres (98 ft) to the northeast of the old church site. It was consecrated on 2 April 1865 by the Bishop Peter Hersleb Graah Birkeland. After the new church completed, the old church was demolished.

== Media gallery ==
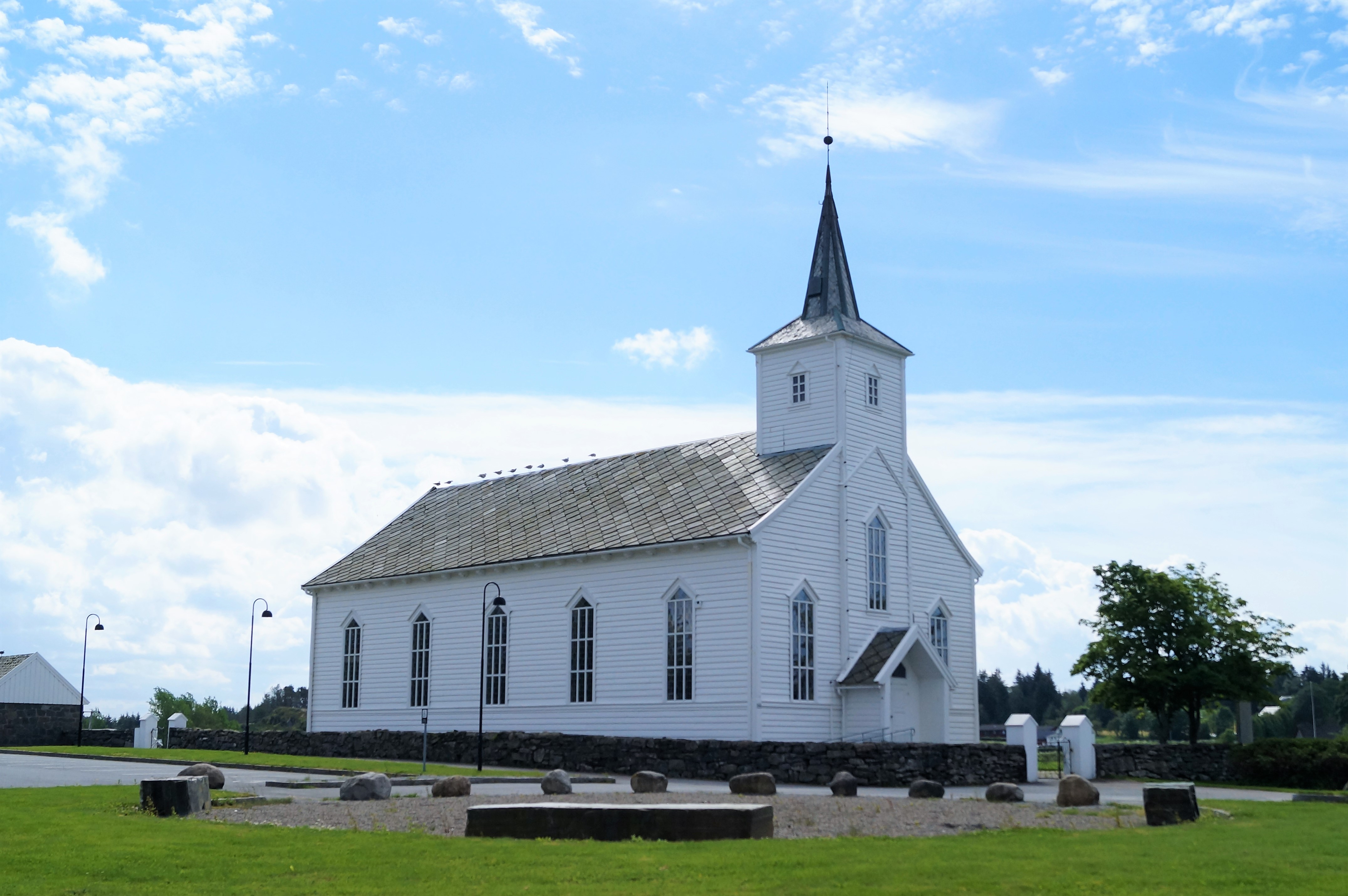

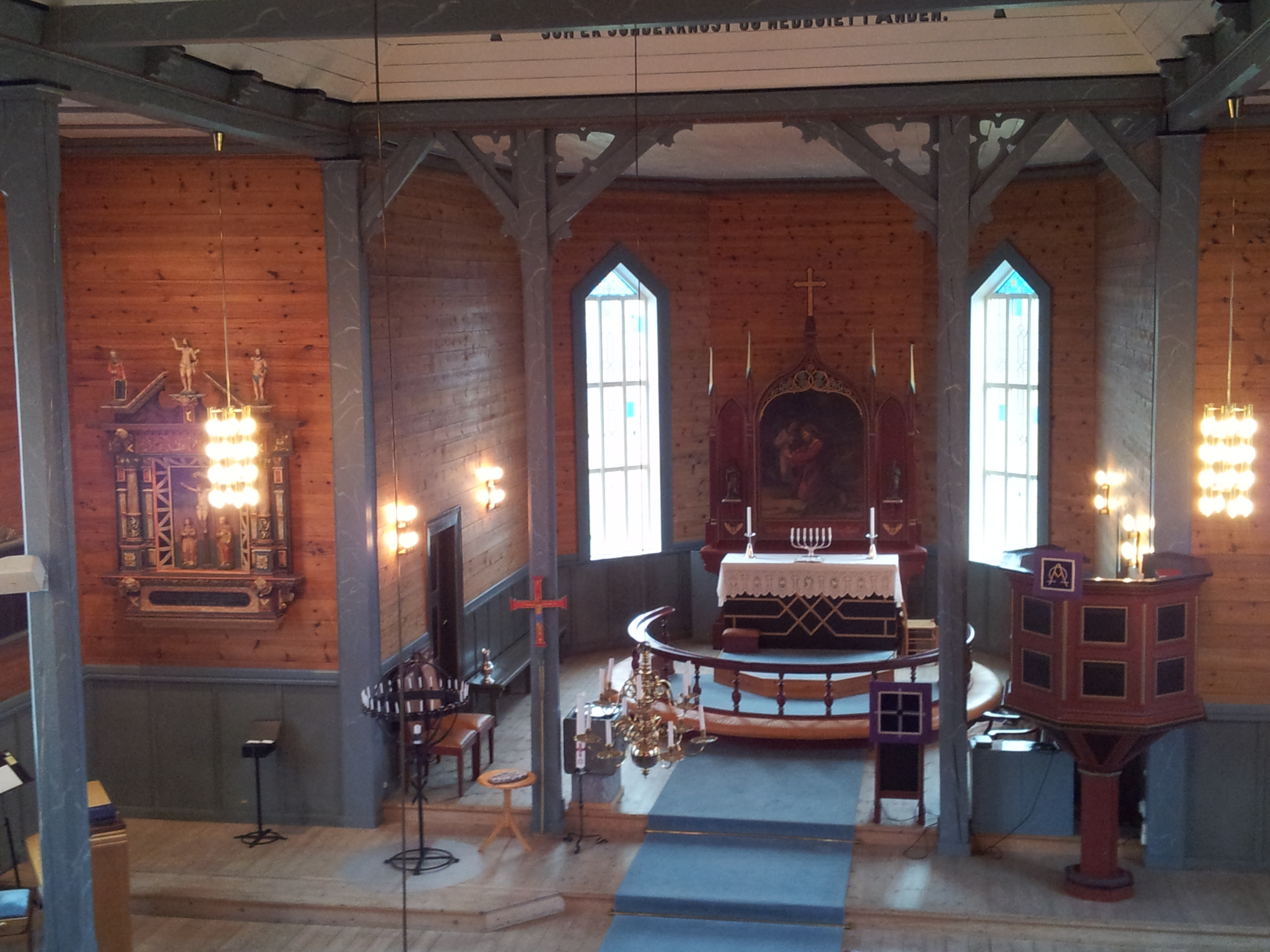

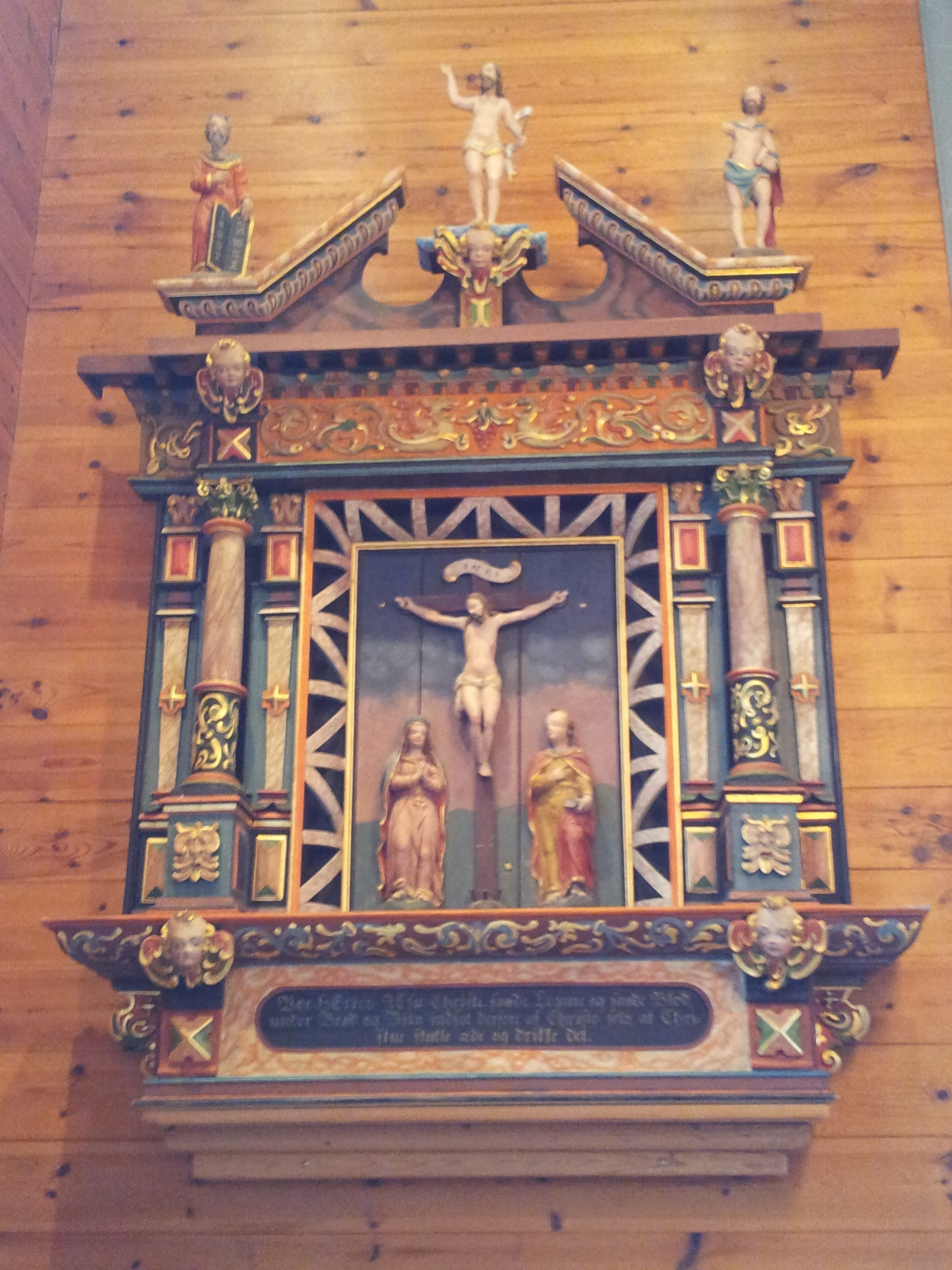

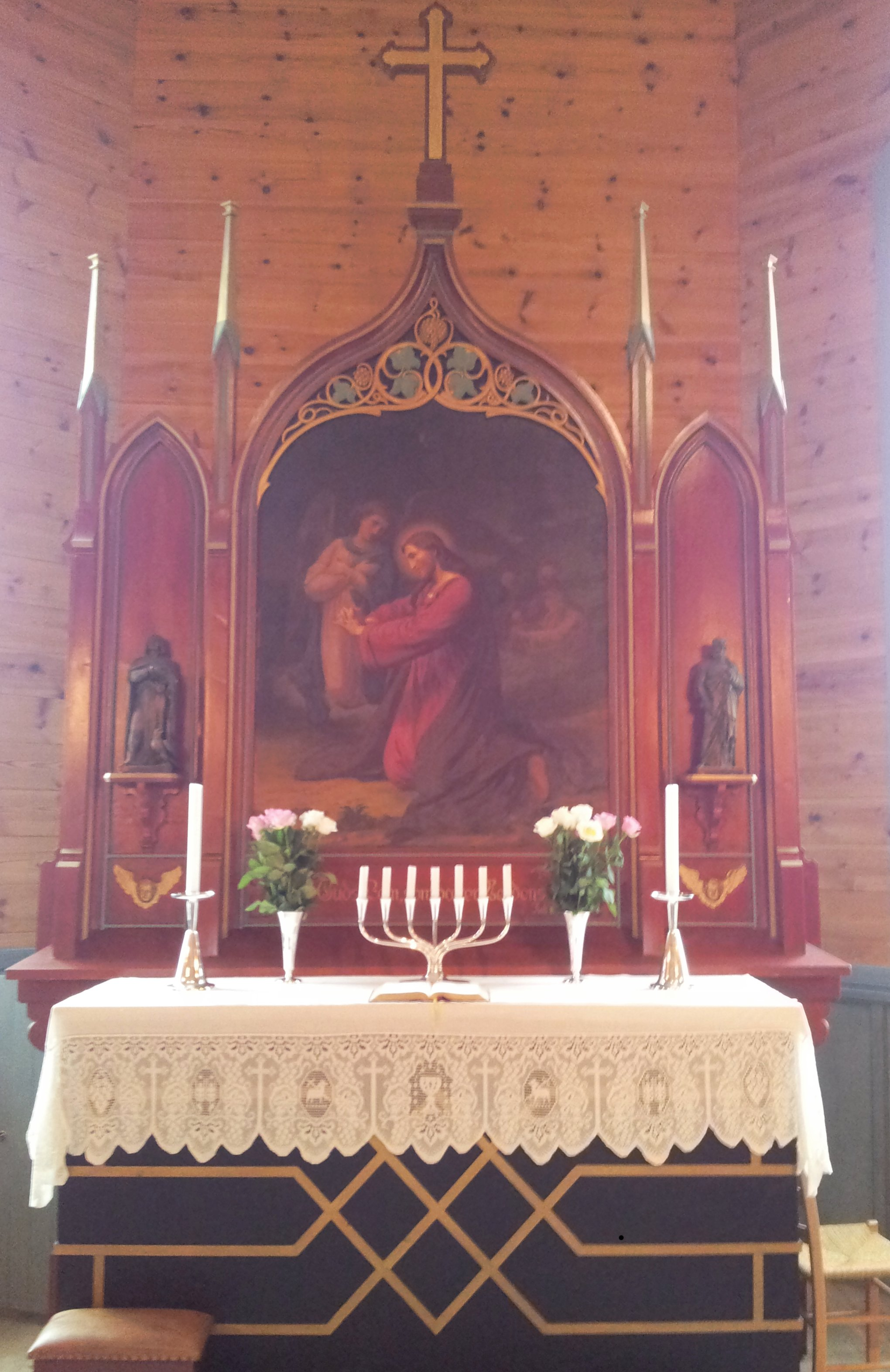

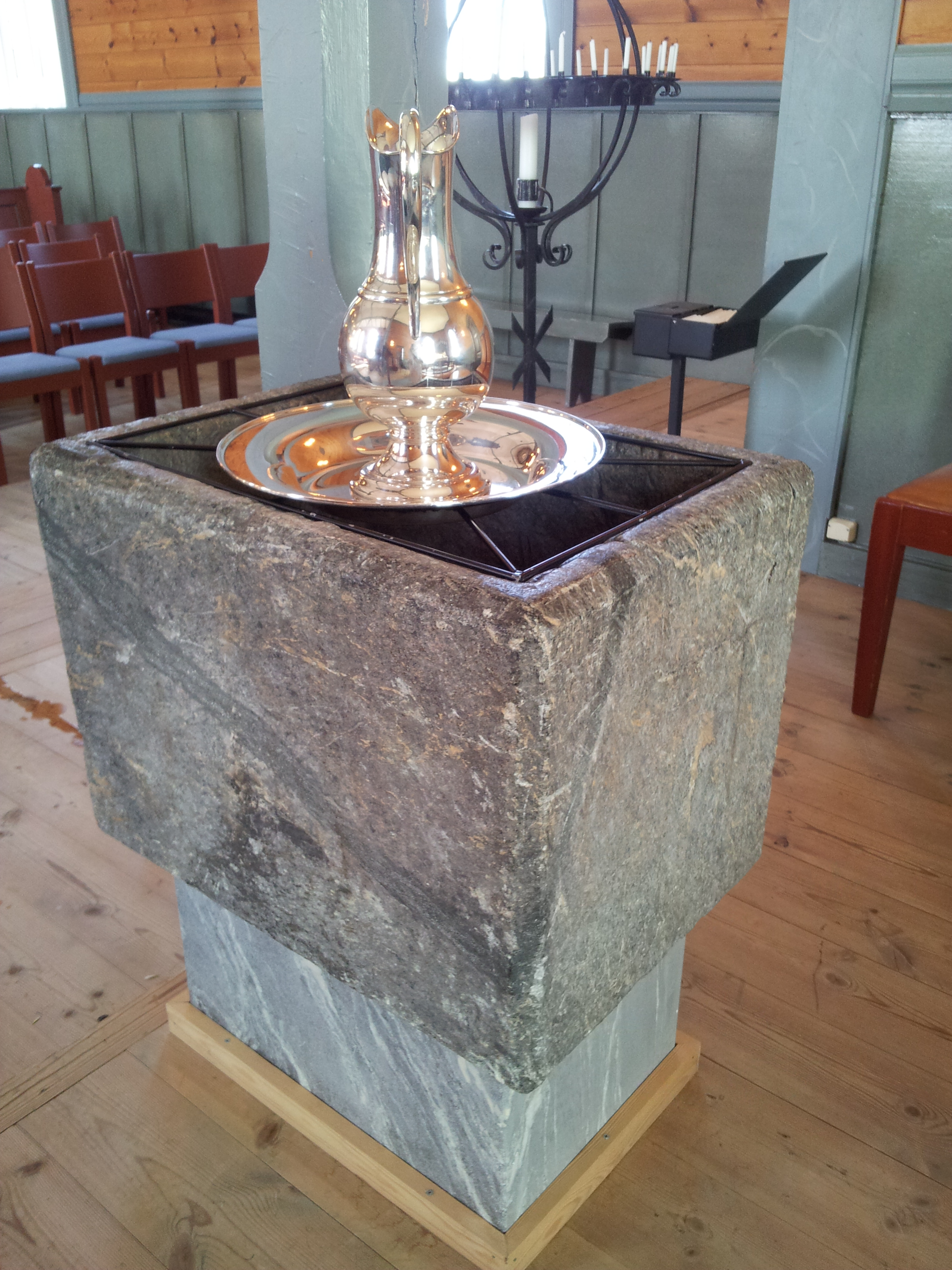

== See also ==
- List of churches in Bjørgvin
