= Austrheim (village) =

Village in Austrheim Municipality, Norway

- Village
- Interactive map of Austrheim
- Coordinates: 60.76368°N 4.91238°E
- Country: Norway
- Region: Western Norway
- County: Vestland
- District: Nordhordland
- Municipality: Austrheim Municipality
- Elevation: 9 m (30 ft)
- Time zone: UTC+01:00 (CET)
  - Summer (DST): UTC+02:00 (CEST)
- Post Code: 5943 Austrheim

Austrheim is a village in Austrheim Municipality in Vestland county, Norway. The village is located on the south-central part of the island of Fosnøyna, at the end of the Austrheimsvågen bay. The village lies about 2 kilometres (1.2 mi) southwest of the municipal centre of Årås. Austrheim Church is located in this village; it is the only church in the municipality.
