= List of county governors of Norway =

The following are lists of county governors of the various counties of Norway. The Norwegian counties are under the supervision of county governors, appointed by the Norwegian government. Historically, there were larger diocesan counties that supervised smaller subordinate counties as well. This distinction was abolished on 1 January 1919. On 1 January 2020, there was a major reorganization and reduction of counties in Norway.

== Current counties ==
- List of county governors of Agder
- List of county governors of Innlandet
- List of county governors of Møre og Romsdal
- List of county governors of Nordland
- List of county governors of Rogaland
- List of county governors of Troms og Finnmark
- List of county governors of Trøndelag
- List of county governors of Vestfold og Telemark
- List of county governors of Vestland
- List of county governors of Østfold, Buskerud, Oslo og Akershus
- Governor of Svalbard

== Historic counties ==
- List of County Governors of Akershus
- List of County Governors of Aust-Agder
- List of County Governors of Buskerud
- List of County Governors of Finnmark
- List of County Governors of Hedmark
- List of County Governors of Hordaland
- List of County Governors of Nord-Trøndelag
- List of County Governors of Oppland
- List of County Governors of Oslo
- List of County Governors of Sogn og Fjordane
- List of County Governors of Sør-Trøndelag
- List of County Governors of Telemark
- List of County Governors of Troms
- List of County Governors of Vest-Agder
- List of County Governors of Vestfold
- List of County Governors of Østfold
- List of Diocesan Governors of Bergen
- List of Diocesan Governors of Hamar
- List of Diocesan Governors of Kristiania
- List of Diocesan Governors of Kristiansand
- List of Diocesan Governors of Trondhjem
- List of Diocesan Governors of Tromsø
