= Frederik Adeler (Danish nobleman) =

Dano-Norwegian noble and government official (1764–1816)

Baron Frederik Adeler
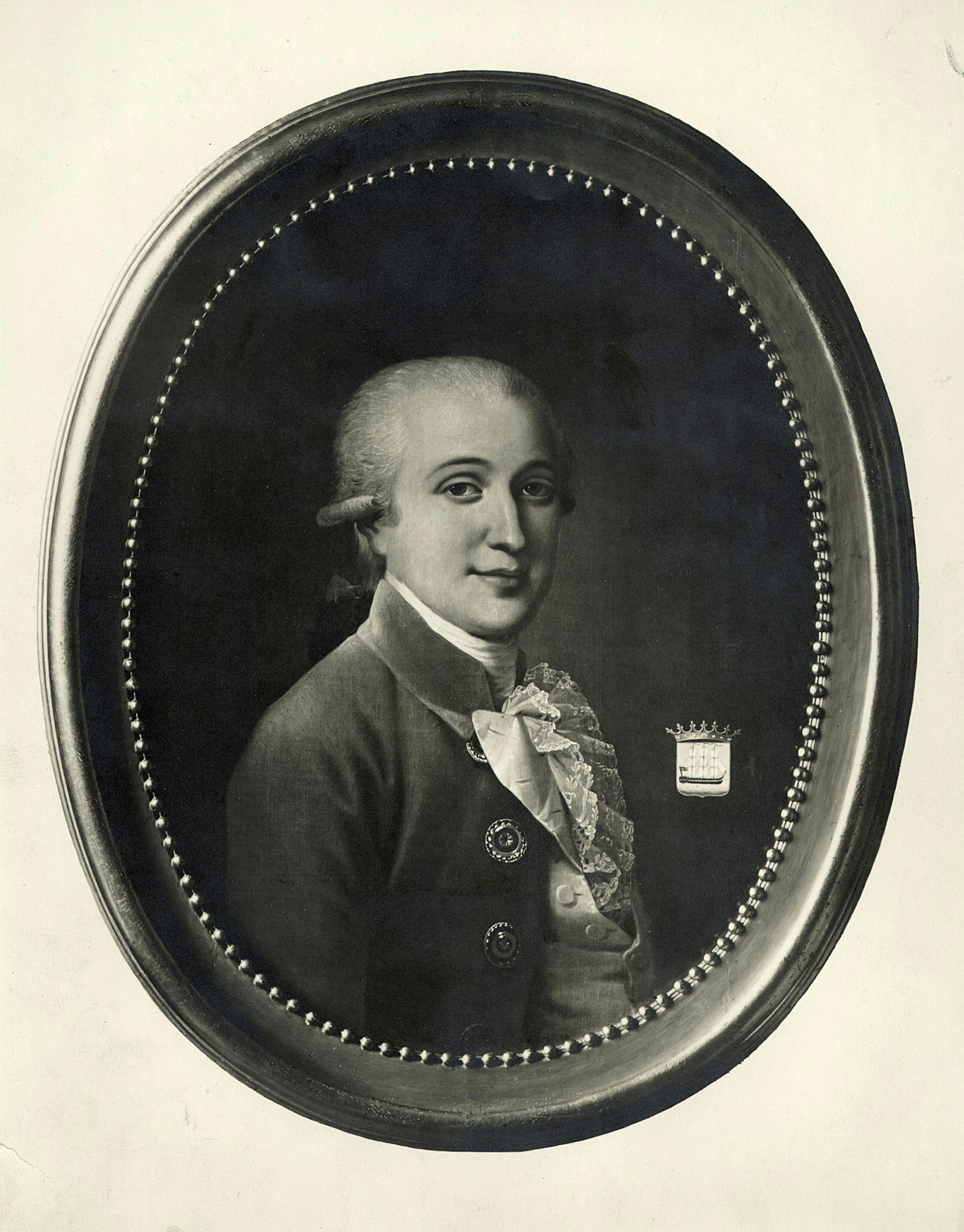

Diocesan Governor of Trondhjems stiftamt
- In office 1802–1804

Diocesan Governor of Fyens stiftamt
- In office 1808–1809

Personal details
- Born: 25 July 1764 Dragsholm Castle, Denmark
- Died: 23 March 1816 (aged 51) Copenhagen, Denmark
- Citizenship: Denmark-Norway
- Profession: Government official

Frederik Adeler (25 July 1764 – 23 August 1816) was a Danish noble and government official who served as lord president (overpræsident) of Copenhagen from 1805 until his death in 1816. He had also served as the county governor and diocesan governor of several counties in Denmark-Norway.

== Early life ==
Adeler was born on 25 July 1764 at Adelersborg as the son of Baron Conrad Wilhelm Adeler and Ulrika Helene de Cicignon. His paternal grandfather was Frederik Adeler.

== Career ==
At the age of 14, he was appointed as Kammerjunker (court title). In 1790, he became a junior member ( supernummrér Kommitteret) of Generaltoldkammeret. In 1792 m he was appointed as chamberlain (Kammerherre).

In 1802 he was appointed diocesan governor of Trondhjem as well as the county governor of Trondhjem. After two years, he was transferred to Denmark as the County Governor of his home county Holbæk. In 1808 he became Diocesan Governor of the Diocese of Funen as well as the County Governor of Odense County.

In 1809, he was appointed as Lord President (overpræsident) of Copenhagen. In the same year, he was awarded the title of gehejme-konferensraad. In 1804 he had received the Grand Cross of the Order of the Dannebrog.

== Personal life ==
In 1785, Adeler succeeded his brother to the Barony of Adelersborg in Denmark and Gimsøy Abbey in Norway. In 1710, he had it replaced by a Fideikommis capital (family trust).

On 1 July 1786, Adeler married Berta Countess Moltke (1767–1846). She was a daughter of the influential Adam Gottlob Moltke and Sophie Hedevig von Raben. Adeler died suddenly in Copenhagen on 23 March 1816. His widow would only survived him by 30 years. Their daughter and only child Sophie Hedevig baroness Adeler was married to county governor Herman Løvenskiold (1783–1825). Adelersborg remained in the hands of her descendents as an allodial estate.

Government offices
| Preceded by Gebhard Moltke | Diocesan Governor of Trondhjems stiftamt 1802–1804 | Succeeded by Erik Must Angell |
| Preceded by Gebhard Moltke | County Governor of Trondhjems amt 1802–1804 | Office abolished Succeeded by: Erik Must Angell (County Governor of Sør-Trøndelag) and Caspar Conrad Rafn (County Governor of Nord-Trøndelag) |
| Preceded by Michael Herman Løvenskiold | County Governor of Holbæk Amt; 1804–1808 | Succeeded by Christian Cornelius Lerche |
| Preceded by Poul Rosenørn Gersdorff | Diocesan Governor of Fyens Stiftamt; 1808–1809 | Succeeded by Gebhard Moltke |
| Preceded by Poul Rosenørn Gersdorff | County Governor of Odense Amt; 1808–1809 | Succeeded by Gebhard Moltke |
