= Aust-Agder County Municipality =

Aust-Agder County Municipality Aust-Agder fylkeskommune
- Former County
- Coat of arms

- Location in Norway
- Coordinates: 58°27′52″N 8°46′01″E
- Country: Norway
- Established: 1 Jan 1976
- Disestablished: 1 Jan 2020
- Administrative center: Arendal

Government
  - County mayor: Gro Bråten
  - Chairman of Cabinet: Arild Eielsen
- ISO 3166 code: NO-09
- Employees: 1,100
- Schools: 8
- Pupils: 4,500
- Transit authority: None

Aust-Agder County Municipality (Norwegian: Aust-Agder fylkeskommune) was the regional governing administration of the old Aust-Agder county in Norway. The administrative centre of the county is the town of Arendal.

The county municipality was established on 1 January 1976 when the law was changed to allow elected county councils in Norway. The county municipality was dissolved on 1 January 2020, when Aust-Agder was merged with the neighboring Vest-Agder county, creating the new Agder county which is led by the Agder County Municipality.

From 2017 until its dissolution in 2020, Gro Bråten of the Labour Party was the County Mayor and the Deputy County Mayor was Jon-Olav Strand of the Christian Democratic Party. Stein Ytterdahl was the last County Governor of Aust-Agder (from 2016 until its dissolution in 2020, there was one county governor for both Aust-Agder and Vest-Agder counties). The Governor was the representative of the King and Government of Norway in the county, functioning as the connection between the state and the municipalities.

== County government ==
The county municipality's most important tasks included secondary education (8 schools with about 4,500 pupils), recreation (sports and outdoor life), and cultural heritage. The county municipality was also responsible for all county roads (including ferry operations) and public transport (including school busses). The county municipality had further responsibility for regional land-use planning, business development, power production, and environmental management. The county also had responsibility for providing dental health services (in 2002, responsibility for hospitals and public medicine was transferred from the counties to the new regional health authorities).

=== County mayor ===
Since 1963, the county mayor (Norwegian: fylkesordfører) of Aust-Agder has been the political leader of the county and the chairperson of the county council. Prior to 1963, the County governor led the council which was made up of all of the mayors of the rural municipalities within the county. Here is a list of people who have held this position:

- 1964–1971: Andreas Holm (Sp)
- 1972–1975: Kristen K. Flaa (Sp)
- 1976–1983: Kristian Sundtoft (H)
- 1984–1995: Erik Mørch (H)
- 1995–1999: Jon Fløistad (Sp)
- 1999–2007: Oddvar Skaiaa (KrF)
- 2007–2011: Laila Øygarden (Ap)
- 2011–2015: Bjørgulv S. Lund (H)
- 2015–2017: Tellef Inge Mørland (Ap)
- 2017–2019: Gro Bråten (Ap)

=== County council ===
The county council (Norwegian: Fylkestinget) was made up of 35 representatives that were elected by direct election by all legal residents of the county every fourth year. The council was the legislative body for the county. The county council typically met about six times a year. Council members were divided into standing committees and an executive committee (fylkesutvalg), which met considerably more often. Both the council and executive committee (with at least 5 members) were led by the county mayor (Norwegian: fylkesordfører). The executive committee carried out the executive functions of the county under the direction of the whole council. The tables below show the historical composition of the council by political party.

Aust-Agder fylkesting 2015–2019
| Party name (in Norwegian) | Number of representatives |
|---|---|
| Labour Party (Arbeiderpartiet) | 11 |
| Progress Party (Fremskrittspartiet) | 4 |
| Green Party (Miljøpartiet De Grønne) | 1 |
| Conservative Party (Høyre) | 7 |
| Christian Democratic Party (Kristelig Folkeparti) | 5 |
| Pensioners' Party (Pensjonistpartiet) | 1 |
| Centre Party (Senterpartiet) | 3 |
| Socialist Left Party (Sosialistisk Venstreparti) | 1 |
| Liberal Party (Venstre) | 2 |
| Total number of members: | 35 |

Aust-Agder fylkesting 2012–2015
| Party name (in Norwegian) | Number of representatives |
|---|---|
| Labour Party (Arbeiderpartiet) | 10 |
| Progress Party (Fremskrittspartiet) | 5 |
| Conservative Party (Høyre) | 10 |
| Christian Democratic Party (Kristelig Folkeparti) | 4 |
| Pensioners' Party (Pensjonistpartiet) | 1 |
| Centre Party (Senterpartiet) | 2 |
| Socialist Left Party (Sosialistisk Venstreparti) | 1 |
| Liberal Party (Venstre) | 2 |
| Total number of members: | 35 |

Aust-Agder fylkesting 2008–2011
| Party name (in Norwegian) | Number of representatives |
|---|---|
| Labour Party (Arbeiderpartiet) | 9 |
| Progress Party (Fremskrittspartiet) | 7 |
| Conservative Party (Høyre) | 6 |
| Christian Democratic Party (Kristelig Folkeparti) | 5 |
| Pensioners' Party (Pensjonistpartiet) | 1 |
| Centre Party (Senterpartiet) | 3 |
| Socialist Left Party (Sosialistisk Venstreparti) | 2 |
| Liberal Party (Venstre) | 2 |
| Total number of members: | 35 |

Aust-Agder fylkesting 2004–2007
| Party name (in Norwegian) | Number of representatives |
|---|---|
| Labour Party (Arbeiderpartiet) | 8 |
| Progress Party (Fremskrittspartiet) | 7 |
| Conservative Party (Høyre) | 6 |
| Christian Democratic Party (Kristelig Folkeparti) | 5 |
| Pensioners' Party (Pensjonistpartiet) | 1 |
| Centre Party (Senterpartiet) | 3 |
| Socialist Left Party (Sosialistisk Venstreparti) | 4 |
| Liberal Party (Venstre) | 1 |
| Total number of members: | 35 |

Aust-Agder fylkesting 2000–2003
| Party name (in Norwegian) | Number of representatives |
|---|---|
| Labour Party (Arbeiderpartiet) | 10 |
| Progress Party (Fremskrittspartiet) | 5 |
| Conservative Party (Høyre) | 6 |
| Christian Democratic Party (Kristelig Folkeparti) | 7 |
| Centre Party (Senterpartiet) | 3 |
| Socialist Left Party (Sosialistisk Venstreparti) | 2 |
| Liberal Party (Venstre) | 2 |
| Total number of members: | 35 |

Aust-Agder fylkesting 1996–1999
| Party name (in Norwegian) | Number of representatives |
|---|---|
| Labour Party (Arbeiderpartiet) | 10 |
| Progress Party (Fremskrittspartiet) | 3 |
| Conservative Party (Høyre) | 6 |
| Christian Democratic Party (Kristelig Folkeparti) | 5 |
| Pensioners' Party (Pensjonistpartiet) | 2 |
| Centre Party (Senterpartiet) | 5 |
| Socialist Left Party (Sosialistisk Venstreparti) | 2 |
| Liberal Party (Venstre) | 2 |
| Total number of members: | 35 |

Aust-Agder fylkesting 1992–1995
| Party name (in Norwegian) | Number of representatives |
|---|---|
| Labour Party (Arbeiderpartiet) | 8 |
| Progress Party (Fremskrittspartiet) | 3 |
| Conservative Party (Høyre) | 6 |
| Christian Democratic Party (Kristelig Folkeparti) | 5 |
| Pensioners' Party (Pensjonistpartiet) | 3 |
| Centre Party (Senterpartiet) | 5 |
| Socialist Left Party (Sosialistisk Venstreparti) | 3 |
| Liberal Party (Venstre) | 2 |
| Total number of members: | 35 |

Aust-Agder fylkesting 1988–1991
| Party name (in Norwegian) | Number of representatives |
|---|---|
| Labour Party (Arbeiderpartiet) | 13 |
| Progress Party (Fremskrittspartiet) | 3 |
| Conservative Party (Høyre) | 8 |
| Christian Democratic Party (Kristelig Folkeparti) | 5 |
| Centre Party (Senterpartiet) | 3 |
| Socialist Left Party (Sosialistisk Venstreparti) | 1 |
| Liberal Party (Venstre) | 2 |
| Total number of members: | 35 |

Aust-Agder fylkesting 1984–1987
| Party name (in Norwegian) | Number of representatives |
|---|---|
| Labour Party (Arbeiderpartiet) | 13 |
| Progress Party (Fremskrittspartiet) | 2 |
| Conservative Party (Høyre) | 9 |
| Christian Democratic Party (Kristelig Folkeparti) | 5 |
| Centre Party (Senterpartiet) | 3 |
| Socialist Left Party (Sosialistisk Venstreparti) | 2 |
| Liberal Party (Venstre) | 2 |
| Total number of members: | 35 |

Aust-Agder fylkesting 1980–1983
| Party name (in Norwegian) | Number of representatives |
|---|---|
| Labour Party (Arbeiderpartiet) | 12 |
| Progress Party (Fremskrittspartiet) | 1 |
| Conservative Party (Høyre) | 9 |
| Christian Democratic Party (Kristelig Folkeparti) | 6 |
| Liberal People's Party (Liberale Folkepartiet) | 1 |
| Centre Party (Senterpartiet) | 3 |
| Socialist Left Party (Sosialistisk Venstreparti) | 1 |
| Liberal Party (Venstre) | 2 |
| Total number of members: | 35 |

Aust-Agder fylkesting 1976–1979
| Party name (in Norwegian) | Number of representatives |
|---|---|
| Labour Party (Arbeiderpartiet) | 11 |
| Anders Lange's Party (Anders Langes parti) | 2 |
| Conservative Party (Høyre) | 7 |
| Christian Democratic Party (Kristelig Folkeparti) | 7 |
| New People's Party (Nye Folkepartiet) | 2 |
| Centre Party (Senterpartiet) | 4 |
| Socialist Left Party (Sosialistisk Venstreparti) | 1 |
| Liberal Party (Venstre) | 1 |
| Total number of members: | 35 |
