= Counties of Norway =

First-level administrative divisions of Norway

Counties of Norway Norges fylker (Bokmål) Noregs fylke (Nynorsk)
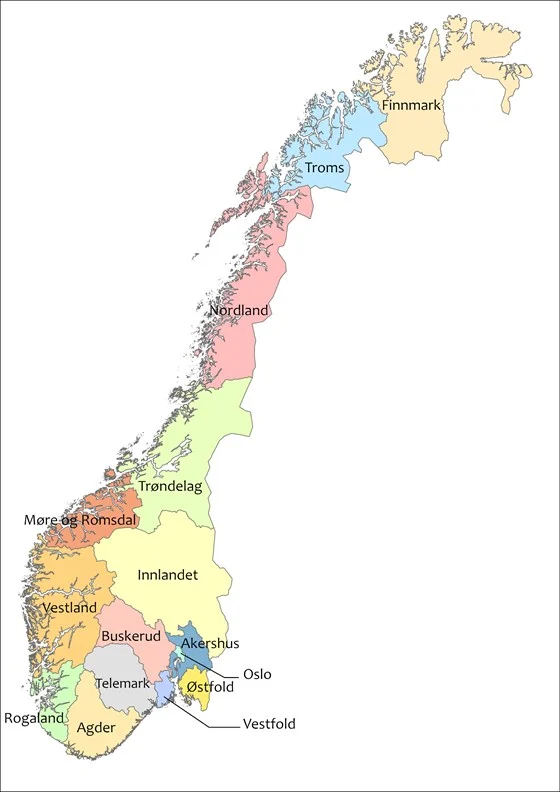
- Mainland Norway with its 15 first-order subnational divisions (fylker or "counties") since January 1st 2024.
- Category: Unitary unit
- Location: Norway
- Number: 15 counties (as of 2024-01-01)
- Areas: Smallest (including water): Oslo, 454.12 km^{2} (175.34 sq mi); Largest (including water): Innlandet, 52,072.44 km^{2} (20,105.28 sq mi)
- Government: County municipality
- Subdivisions: Municipalities

The 15 counties of Norway are the first-level administrative divisions of Norway. The counties are further subdivided into 357 municipalities (Norwegian: kommune). The island territories of Svalbard and Jan Mayen are outside the county divisions and they are ruled directly from the national level. The capital city of Oslo is both a county and a municipality.

In 2017, the Solberg government decided to abolish some of the counties and to merge them with other counties to form larger ones, reducing the number of counties from 19 to 11, which was implemented on 1 January 2020. This sparked popular opposition, with some calling for the reform to be reversed. The Storting voted to partly undo the reform on 14 June 2022, with Norway to have 15 counties from 1 January 2024. Three of the newly merged counties, namely Vestfold og Telemark, Viken and Troms og Finnmark, were dissolved and the old counties existing before the reform re-established with a few minor changes as some municipalities merged across former county borders and some switched counties during the 2020 local government reform (Regionreformen i Norge).

== Name ==
The counties in Norway are called fylke (singular) and fylker (plural). This name comes from the Old Norse word fylki which means "district" or "county", but it is similar to the same root as "folk". It is similar in the minority languages in Norway: Northern Sami: fylka, Southern Sami: fylhke, Lule Sami: fylkka, Kven: fylkki. Prior to 1918, the counties were known as amt (singular) or amter (plural).

== List of counties ==
Below is a list of the Norwegian counties, with their current administrative centres. The counties are administered both by appointees of the national government and by their own elected bodies. The county numbers are from the official numbering system ISO 3166-2:NO, which originally was set up to follow the coastline from the Swedish border in the southeast to the Russian border in the northeast, but with the numbering has changed with county mergers.

The island territories of Svalbard and Jan Mayen lie outside of the county system of Norway. Svalbard is administered by the Governor of Svalbard, and Jan Mayen is administered by the County Governor of Nordland (but not part of Nordland).

County	ISO-code	Capital	Most populous municipality	Governor	Mayor	Area (km^{2})	Pop.	Electoral district(s)	County governor agency	Official language form
Oslo	NO-03	City of Oslo	Oslo	Ingvild Aleksandersen	Anne Lindboe (H)	454.12	700,000	Oslo	Østfold, Buskerud, Oslo og Akershus	Neutral
Rogaland	NO-11	Stavanger	Stavanger	Bent Høie	Marianne Chesak (Ap)	9,377.10	475,000	Rogaland	Rogaland	Neutral
Møre og Romsdal	NO-15	Molde	Ålesund	Else-May Norderhus	Jon Aasen (Ap)	14,355.62	270,000	Møre og Romsdal	Møre og Romsdal	Nynorsk
Nordland	NO-18	Bodø	Bodø	Tom Cato Karlsen	Kari Anne Bøkestad Andreassen (Sp)	38,154.62	239,000	Nordland	Nordland	Neutral
Østfold	NO-31	Sarpsborg	Fredrikstad	Ingvild Aleksandersen	Sindre Martinsen-Evje (Ap)	4,180.7	299,647	Østfold	Østfold, Buskerud, Oslo og Akershus	Neutral
Akershus	NO-32	Oslo	Bærum	Ingvild Aleksandersen	Thomas Sjøvold (H)	4,918.0	630,752	Akershus	Østfold, Buskerud, Oslo og Akershus	Neutral
Buskerud	NO-33	Drammen	Drammen	Ingvild Aleksandersen	Tore Opdal Hansen (H)	14,908.0	284,955	Buskerud	Østfold, Buskerud, Oslo og Akershus	Neutral
Innlandet	NO-34	Hamar	Ringsaker	Knut Storberget	Even Aleksander Hagen (Ap)	52,072.44	375,000	Hedmark; Oppland	Innlandet	Neutral
Vestfold	NO-39	Tønsberg	Sandefjord	Trond Rønningen	Anne Strømøy (H)	2,167.7	253,555	Vestfold	Vestfold og Telemark	Bokmål
Telemark	NO-40	Skien	Skien	Trond Rønningen	Sven Tore Løkslid (Ap)	15,298.16	175,546	Telemark	Vestfold og Telemark	Neutral
Agder	NO-42	Kristiansand	Kristiansand	Gina Lund	Arne Thomassen (H)	16,434.12	299,000	Aust-Agder; Vest-Agder	Agder	Neutral
Vestland	NO-46	Bergen	Bergen	Liv Signe Navarsete	Jon Askeland (Sp)	33,870.99	632,000	Hordaland; Sogn og Fjordane	Vestland	Nynorsk
Trøndelag; Trööndelage	NO-50	Steinkjer	Trondheim	Frank Jenssen	Tomas Iver Hallem (Sp)	42,201.59	465,000	Nord-Trøndelag; Sør-Trøndelag	Trøndelag	Neutral
Troms	NO-55	Tromsø	Tromsø	Elisabeth Aspaker	Kristina Torbergsen (Ap)	26,189.43	168,340	Troms	Troms og Finnmark	Neutral
Finnmark	NO-56	Vadsø	Alta	Elisabeth Aspaker	Hans-Jacob Bønå (H)	48,637.43	75,540	Finnmark	Troms og Finnmark	Neutral

== Responsibilities and significance ==
Every county has two main organisations, both with underlying organisations.

1. The county municipality (Norwegian: Fylkeskommune) has a county council (Norwegian: Fylkesting), whose members are elected by the inhabitants. The county municipality is responsible mainly for some medium level schools, public transport organisation, regional road planning, culture, among other things.
2. The county governor (Norwegian: Statsforvalteren) is an authority directly overseen by the Norwegian government. It surveills the municipalities and receives complaints from people over their actions. It also controls areas where the government needs local direct ruling outside the municipalities.

== History ==
=== Fylke (1st period) ===
From the consolidation to a single kingdom, Norway was divided into a number of geographic regions that each had its own legislative assembly or Thing, such as Gulating (Western Norway) and Frostating (Trøndelag). The second-order subdivision of these regions was into fylker, such as Egdafylke and Hordafylke. In 1914, the historical term fylke was brought into use again to replace the term amt introduced during the union with Denmark. Current day counties (fylker) often, but not necessarily, correspond to the historical areas.

==== Fylke in the 10th–13th centuries ====
Counties (folkland) under the Borgarting, located in Viken with the seat at Sarpsborg:

- Rånrike
- Vingulmark
- Vestfold
- Grenland

Counties (first three fylke, last two bilandskap) under the Eidsivating, located in Oplandene with the seat at Eidsvoll:

- Raumafylke (Glåmdalen, Romerike, Solør)
- Heinafylke (Gjøvik, Hedmarken)
- Hadafylke (Hadeland, Land, Toten)
- Gudbrandsdal
- Østerdal

Counties under the Gulating, located in Vestlandet with the seat at Gulen Municipality:

- Sunnmærafylke
- Firdafylke (Nordfjord, Sunnfjord)
- Sygnafylke
- Valdres and Hallingdal
- Hordafylke
- Rygjafylke
- Setesdal
- Egdafylke

Counties under the Frostating, located in Trøndelag with the seat at Frosta:

- Eynafylke
- Sparbyggjafylke
- Verdælafylke
- Skeynafylke
- Orkdælafylke
- Gauldælafylke
- Stjordælafylke
- Strindafylke
- Naumdælafylke
- Nordmærafylke
- Romsdælafylke

Counties not attached to a thing:

- Jamtaland
- Herjedalen
- Håløygjafylke
  - Helgeland
  - Salten
  - Lofoten and Vesterålen
  - Trondenes

Finnmark (including northern Troms), the Faroe Islands, the Orkney Islands, Shetland (the Shetland Islands), the Hebrides, the Isle of Man, Iceland and Greenland were Norwegian skattland ("taxed countries"), and did not belong to any known counties or assembly areas.

=== Syssel ===
==== Syssel in 1300 ====
From the end of the 12th century, Norway was divided into several syssel. The head of the syssel was the syslemann, who represented the king locally. The following shows a reconstruction of the different syssel in Norway c. 1300, including sub-syssel where these seem established.

- Elvesysle
- Rånrike
- Borgarsysle (two parts)
- Romerike (two parts, "northern" and "southern")
- Hedmark (two parts, "northern" and "southern")
- Østerdalen
  - "north of Åmot"
  - "south of Åmot"
- Gudbrandsdalen
  - "north of Ruste"
  - "south of Ruste"
- Hadeland (later Ringerike, two parts, "northern" and "outer")
- Valdres and Hallingdal (two parts)
- Numedal and Telemark?
- Tverrdalane and Modum?
- Oslosysle (northern lut and western lut)
- Tønsbergsysle
- Skiensysle
- Eastern part (later Nedenes)
- Robyggjelag
- Agder Midtsysla
- Lista
- Rygjafylke
  - "north of the fjord"
  - "south of the fjord"
- Hordaland (Nordhordland? and Sunnhordland?)
- Hardanger
- Voss
- Sogn (two parts?)
- Sunnfjord
- Nordfjord
- Sunnmøre
- Romsdal
- Nordmøre?
  - Nordmørafylke
- Orkdalen
- Gauldalen
- Strinda
- Herjedalen
- Jemtland
- Stjørdal
- Skogn
- Verdalen
- Sparbu
- Eynafylke
- Northern part? (later Fosen)
- Namdalen
  - "upper half" (Overhalla)
  - "lower half (later Njardøy)
- Hålogaland (two parts)
- Troms?
- Finnmark?

=== Len ===
From 1308, the term len (plural len) in Norway signified an administrative region roughly equivalent to today's counties. The historic len was an important administrative entity during the period of Dano-Norwegian unification after their amalgamation as one state, which lasted for the period 1536–1814.

At the beginning of the 16th century the political divisions were variable, but consistently included four main len and approximately 30 smaller sub-regions with varying connections to a main len. Up to 1660 the four principal len were headquartered at the major fortresses Bohus Fortress, Akershus Fortress, Bergenhus Fortress and the fortified city of Trondheim. The sub-regions corresponded to the church districts for the Lutheran church in Norway.

==== Len in 1536 ====
- Båhus len (later termed Bohuslän after Denmark-Norway ceded it to Sweden by the Treaty of Roskilde in 1658)
- Akershus len
- Trondheim len
- Bergenhus len (which included Northern Norway)

These four principal len were in the 1530s divided into approximately 30 smaller regions. From that point forward through the beginning of the 17th century the number of subsidiary len was reduced, while the composition of the principal len became more stable.

==== Len in 1660 ====
From 1660 Norway had nine principal len comprising 17 subsidiary len:

- Akershus len
- Tunsberg len
- Bratsberg len
- Agdesiden len
- Stavanger len
- Bergenhus len
- Trondheim len
- Nordlandene len
- Vardøhus len

Len written as län continues to be used as the administrative equivalent of county in Sweden to this day. Each len was governed by a lenman.

=== Amt ===
With the royal decree of 19 February 1662, each len was designated an amt (plural amt) and the lenmann was titled amtmann, from German Amt (office), reflecting the bias of the Danish court of that period.

==== Amt in 1671 ====
After 1671 Norway was divided into four principal amt or stiftsamt and there were nine subordinate amt:

- Akershus amt
  - Smålenene amt
  - Brunla amt
- Agdesiden amt
  - Bratsberg amt
  - Stavanger amt
- Bergenhus amt
  - Halsnøy klostergods
  - Hardanger amt
  - Nordlandene amt
- Trondheim amt
  - Romsdalen amt
  - Vardøhus amt

==== Amt in 1730 ====
From 1730 Norway had the following amt:

- Vardøhus amt
- Tromsø amt
- Nordlands amt
- Nordre Trondhjems amt
- Søndre Trondhjems amt
- Romsdalen amt
- Nordre Bergenhus amt
- Søndre Bergenhus amt
- Stavanger amt
- Lister og Mandals amt
- Nedenes amt
- Bratsberg amt
- Buskerud amt
- Oplandenes amt
- Hedemarkens amt
- Akershus amt
- Smaalenenes amt

At this time there were also two counties (Norwegian: grevskap) controlled by actual counts, together forming what is now Vestfold county:

- Laurvigen county
- Jarlsberg county

==== Amt in 1760 ====
In 1760 Norway had the following stiftamt and amt:

- Akershus stiftamt
  - Opplands amt
  - Akershus amt
  - Smålenenes amt
  - Laurvigen county
  - Jarlsberg county
  - Bratsberg amt (eastern half)
- Agdesiden stiftamt
  - Bratsberg amt (western half)
  - Nedenes amt
  - Lister and Mandal amt
  - Stavanger amt
- Bergenhus stiftamt
  - Romsdal amt (southern half)
- Trondheim stiftamt
  - Romsdal amt (northern half)
  - Nordlands amt
  - Vardøhus amt

=== Fylke (2nd period) ===
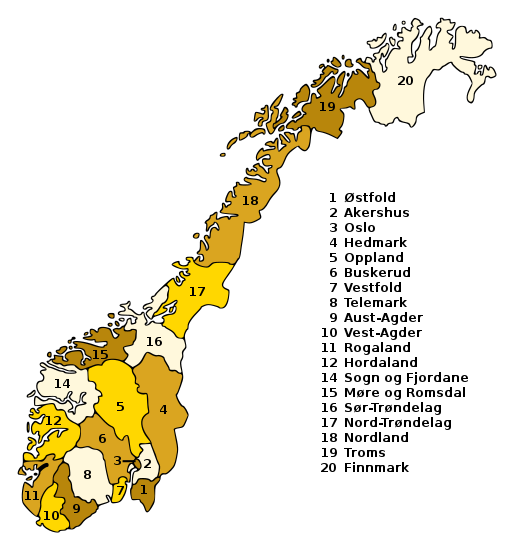
Counties of Norway between 1972 and 2018

From 1919 each amt was renamed a fylke (plural fylke(r)) (county) and the amtmann was now titled fylkesmann (county governor).

The county numbers are from the official numbering system ISO 3166-2:NO, which originally was set up to follow the coastline from the Swedish border in the southeast to the Russian border in the northeast, but the numbering has changed with county mergers. The number 13, 16 and 17 were dropped, and the number 50 was added to account for changes over the years. The lack of a county number 13 is due to the city of Bergen no longer being its own county, and is unrelated to fear of the number 13.

In 2018, Sør-Trøndelag was merged with Nord-Trøndelag into the new county of Trøndelag, and several followed.

ISO-code	County	Administrative centre	Area (km^{2})	Pop. (2016)	County after 1 January 2020	County after 1 January 2024
01	Østfold	Sarpsborg	4,180.69	290,412	Viken	Østfold
02	Akershus	Oslo	4,917.94	596,704	Viken	Akershus
06	Buskerud	Drammen	14,910.94	278,028	Viken	Buskerud
03	Oslo	City of Oslo	454.07	660,987	Oslo	
04	Hedmark	Hamar	27,397.76	195,443	Innlandet	
05	Oppland	Lillehammer	25,192.10	188,945	Innlandet	
07	Vestfold	Tønsberg	2,225.08	245,160	Vestfold og Telemark	Vestfold
08	Telemark	Skien	15,296.34	172,527	Vestfold og Telemark	Telemark
09	Aust-Agder	Arendal	9,157.77	115,873	Agder	
10	Vest-Agder	Kristiansand	7,276.91	182,922	Agder	
11	Rogaland	Stavanger	9,375.97	470,907	Rogaland	
12	Hordaland	Bergen	15,438.06	517,601	Vestland	
13	Not in use from 1972 onwards (Note: Formerly used for Bergen county, merged into Hordaland on 1 January 1972)				Vestland	
14	Sogn og Fjordane	Hermansverk	18,623.41	109,623	Vestland	
15	Møre og Romsdal	Molde	15,101.39	265,181	Møre og Romsdal	
16	Not in use from 2018 onwards (Note: Formerly used for Nord-Trøndelag (#17) and Sør-Trøndelag (#16) counties, merged as Trøndelag on 1 January 2018)					
17	Not in use from 2018 onwards					
18	Nordland	Bodø	38,482.39	241,948	Nordland	
19	Troms	Tromsø	25,862.91	164,613	Troms og Finnmark	Troms
20	Finnmark	Vadsø	48,631.04	75,886	Troms og Finnmark	Finnmark
50	Trøndelag	Steinkjer (Note: Steinkjer is the administrative centre, but the county mayor is seated in Trondheim. Steinkjer and Trondheim are sometimes named as co-capitals)	41,254.29	450,496	Trøndelag	

=== Fylke (3rd period) ===
In 2017, the Norwegian government announced the merge of the existing 19 fylker into 11 new fylker by 2020. As a result, several government responsibilities were transferred to the new regions.

New counties

- Troms og Finnmark, by merging Finnmark and Troms counties in 2020. Disestablished in 2023, split into Finnmark and Troms counties.
- Nordland, no change, same as Nordland county.
- Trøndelag, by merging Nord-Trøndelag and Sør-Trøndelag counties in 2018.
- Møre og Romsdal, no change, same as Møre og Romsdal county.
- Vestland, by merging Hordaland and Sogn og Fjordane counties in 2020.
- Rogaland, no change, same as Rogaland county.
- Agder, by merging Aust-Agder and Vest-Agder counties in 2020.
- Vestfold og Telemark, by merging Telemark and Vestfold counties in 2020. Disestablished in 2023, split into Telemark and Vestfold counties.
- Innlandet, by merging Hedmark and Oppland counties in 2020.
- Viken, by merging Akershus, Buskerud, and Østfold counties in 2020. Disestablished in 2023, split into Akershus, Buskerud, and Østfold counties.
- Oslo, no change, same as Oslo county.

== See also ==
- Municipalities of Norway
- Regions of Norway
- Traditional districts of Norway
- Metropolitan regions of Norway
- Subdivisions of the Nordic countries
- Lists of County Governors of Norway
