= List of diocesan governors of Trondhjem =

The diocesan governor of Trondhjem stiftamt in Norway was a government agency of the Kingdom of Norway. The title was Stiftamtmann (before 1919) and in 1919 all stiftamt were abolished in favor of equal counties (Norwegian: fylker).

The stiftamt (diocesan county) of Trondhjem was established in 1662 by the king. The new Trondhjems stiftamt encompassed the whole Diocese of Trondhjem and it was originally made up the subordinate counties: Trondhjems amt, Vardøhus amt, and the Romsdal and Nordmøre bailiff's territories within Romsdalens amt. In 1685, Nordlandenes amt was transferred into Trondhjems stiftamt from the Bergenhus stiftamt. In 1804, Trondhjems amt (county) was divided into two new counties: Nordre Trondhjems amt and Søndre Trondhjems amt. In 1844, the northern portion (Nordlandenes amt, Tromsø amt, and Finmarkens amt) of the stiftamt was separated and formed the new Tromsø stiftamt. In 1919, there was a large county reorganization in Norway and every stiftamt was abolished and the counties were renamed fylker.

== List of diocesan governors ==
The following is a list of the governors of the Trondhjems stiftamt.

Diocesan governors of Trondhjems stiftamt
Start	End	Name
1662	1665	Claus von Ahlefeldt (1617–1676); Served concurrently as Amtmann for Trondhjems amt.
1665	1674	Ove Bjelke (1614–1674); Served concurrently as Amtmann for Trondhjems amt.
1674	1687	Joachim Frederik Wind (1634–1687); Served concurrently as Amtmann for Trondhjems amt.
1687	1700	Hans Kaas (1640–1700); Served concurrently as Amtmann for Trondhjems amt.
1700	1722	Iver von Ahnen (1657–1722); Served concurrently as Amtmann for Trondhjems amt.
1723	1726	Christian Reitzer (1665–1736); Served concurrently as Amtmann for Trondhjems amt.
1726	1735	Jacob Benzon (1688–1775); Served concurrently as Amtmann for Trondhjems amt.
1736	1744	Christian Ulrich von Nissen-Benzon (1691–1756); Served concurrently as Amtmann for Trondhjems amt.
1744	1747	Christian de Stockfleth (1715–1750); Served concurrently as Amtmann for Trondhjems amt.
1747	1766	Frederik Rantzau (1727–1780); Served concurrently as Amtmann for Trondhjems amt.
1766	1772	Diderik Otto von Grambow (1732–1773); Served concurrently as Amtmann for Trondhjems amt.
1772	1772	Georg Christian Oeder (1728–1791); Served concurrently as Amtmann for Trondhjems amt.
1772	1783	Johan Vibe von der Osten (1708–1800); Served concurrently as Amtmann for Trondhjems amt.
1783	1786	Wilhelm Frimann Koren (1723–1788); Served concurrently as Amtmann for Trondhjems amt.
1786	1796	Thorkild Fjeldsted (1741–1796); Served concurrently as Amtmann for Trondhjems amt.
1796	1802	Gebhard Moltke, Greve of Moltke (1764–1851); Served concurrently as Amtmann for Trondhjems amt.
1802	1804	Frederik Adeler (1764–1816); Served concurrently as Amtmann for Trondhjems amt.
1804	1810	Erik Must Angell (1744–1814); Served concurrently as Amtmann for Søndre Trondhjems amt.
1810	1832	Frederich Christopher Trampe, Count of Trampe (1779–1832); Served concurrently as Amtmann for Søndre Trondhjems amt.
1832	1840	Fredrik Riis (1789–1845); Served concurrently as Amtmann for Søndre Trondhjems amt.
1840	1857	Karelius August Arntzen (1802–1875); Served concurrently as Amtmann for Søndre Trondhjems amt.
1857	1894	Carl Frederik Motzfeldt (1808–1902); Served concurrently as Amtmann for Søndre Trondhjems amt.
1894	1907	Lars Otto Roll Grundt (1843–1907); Served concurrently as Amtmann for Søndre Trondhjems amt.
1907	1918	Harald Bothner (1850–1924); Served concurrently as Amtmann for Søndre Trondhjems amt.
Office abolished on 1 January 1919.
