= Djupedal =

Djupedal is a surname. Notable people with the surname include:

- Øystein Djupedal (born 1960), Norwegian politician
- Reidar Djupedal (1921–1989), Norwegian linguist
