= Brecke =

Brecke is a Norwegian surname. Notable people with the surname include:

- Andreas Brecke (1879–1952), Norwegian sailor
- Johannes Brecke (1877–1943), Norwegian businessman and politician

== See also ==
- Becke
