= Abrahamsen =

Abrahamsen is a Scandinavian patronymic surname. Notable people with the surname include:

- Aase Foss Abrahamsen (1930–2023), Norwegian writer
- Bernhard Abrahamsen (1878–1945), Norwegian politician
- Christine Elizabeth Abrahamsen (1916–1995), American nurse and professor
- David Abrahamsen (1903–2002), Norwegian forensic psychiatrist, psychoanalyst and author
- Egil Abrahamsen (1923–2023), Norwegian ships engineer
- Eric Abrahamsen (born 1978), American literary translator
- Hans Abrahamsen (born 1952), Danish composer
- Helgi Abrahamsen (born 1966), Faroese journalist and politician
- Isak Abrahamsen (1891–1972), Norwegian gymnast
- Jon Abrahamsen (born 1951), Norwegian football goalkeeper
- Jonas Abrahamsen (born 1995), Norwegian professional road racing cyclist
- Knut Leo Abrahamsen (born 1962), Norwegian Nordic combined skier
- Lars Kristian Abrahamsen (1855–1921), Norwegian politician
- Odd Abrahamsen (1924–2001), Norwegian poet
- Olaug Abrahamsen (1928–2010), Norwegian politician
- Solveig Sundbø Abrahamsen (born 1963), Norwegian politician
- Trond Abrahamsen (born 1960), Norwegian ice hockey player

== See also ==
- Point Abrahamsen, point on the north coast of South Georgia island
- Abrahamse, a surname
