= Gunstein Anderson =

Norwegian politician

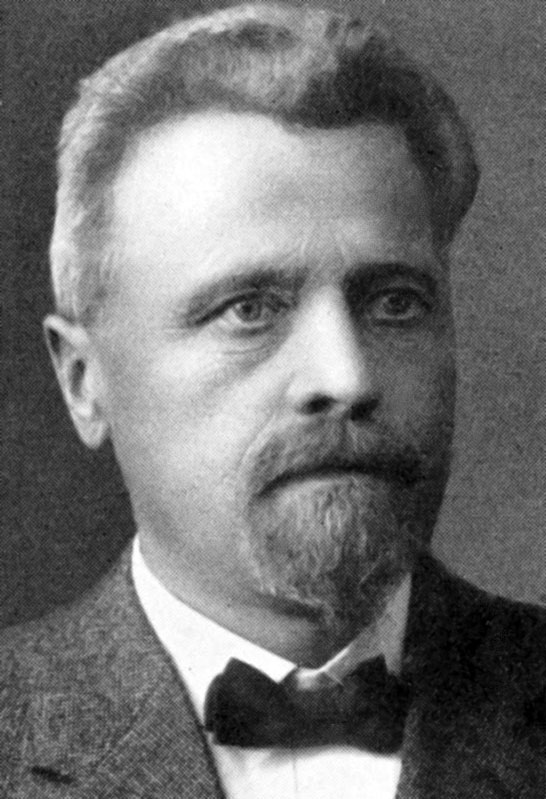
Gunstein Anderson.

Gunstein Anderson (6 November 1860 – 22 November 1926) was a Norwegian school inspector and politician for the Labour Party.

Born in Oddernes, he attended the Kristiansand Teachers' Seminary and worked various teacher jobs in South Norway before being hired in Hokksund in 1883. From 1921 to his death he was the school inspector of Akershus County.

He was a driving force behind the Buskerud County Labour Association, which was founded in 1888 and belonged to the Liberal Party. Together with Christopher Hornsrud and Torgeir Vraa, he orchestrated its transfer into the Labour Party in 1893. Among his main interests within the Labour Party were land policy, and he issued the pamphlet Vore skoger ("Our Forests") in 1908. Historian Per Fuglum called him the most prominent temperance activist within the Labour Party, alongside Anders Buen and Oscar Nissen.

As a politician he sat on Øvre Eiker's school board and chaired Buskerud's school board. He served many years as a member of Øvre Eiker municipal council, including a period as mayor. Within his party, he was also chairman of the board of Fremtiden. In the 1906 Norwegian parliamentary election, he was Labour's candidate in the single-member constituency Numedal, but ended a distant third.

In July 1926 he was awarded the King's Medal of Merit in gold. He died in November 1926.
