= Kibsgaard =

Kibsgaard is a Norwegian surname. Notable people with the surname include:

- Paal Kibsgaard (born 1967), Norwegian petroleum engineer and businessman, chairman and CEO of Schlumberger
- Per Kibsgaard-Petersen (born 1941), Norwegian banker and civil servant
