= Fredrik Riis =

Norwegian civil servant

Fredrik Riis (29 January 1789 – 22 October 1845) was a Norwegian civil servant.

He was born in Christiania, enrolled as a student in 1806 and graduated as cand.jur. in 1809. He worked as a police attorney from 1810, police secretary from 1813 and stipendiary magistrate from 1816.

He then held positions as County Governor in several Norwegian counties: in Nordre Bergenhus amt (today named Sogn og Fjordane) from 1831 to 1832, Søndre Trondhjems amt (today named Sør-Trøndelag) 1832–1840 and Akershus 1840–1842.

When the county of Christiania stiftamt (today named Oslo), which had shared governor with Akershus, got its own governor in 1842, Riis was appointed to this position. This post he held until his death in 1845. In Trondhjem he was a member of the Royal Norwegian Society of Sciences and Letters.

Civic offices
Preceded by Edvard Hagerup	County Governor of Nordre Bergenhus; 1831–1832	Succeeded by Christian Ulrik Kastrup
Preceded by Fredrik Christopher, greve af Trampe	County Governor of Søndre Trondhjem; 1832–1840	Succeeded by Karelius August Arntzen
Preceded by Hans Christian Petersen	County Governor of Akershus; 1840–1842	Succeeded by Erik Røring Møinichen
New office	County Governor of Christiania; 1842–1845	Succeeded by Niels Arntzen Sem
