= Frederik Adeler (disambiguation) =

Frederik Adeler (1700–1766) was a Danish government official and governor.

Frederik Adeler may also refer to:

- Frederik Christian Adeler (1668–1726), Danish courtier and county governor
- Frederik Georg Adeler (1736–1810), Dano-Norwegian county official and landowner
- Frederik Adeler (Danish nobleman) (1764–1816), Dano-Norwegian noble and government official
