= Register for Governmental Approval of Financial Obligations =

The Register for Governmental Approval of Financial Obligations (Norwegian: Register om betinget godkjenning og kontroll, ROBEK) is a Norwegian government register of municipalities and counties who have not submitted a balanced budget. The consequence of being in the registry is that resolutions of incurring debt, or entering long-term rental contracts must be approved by Norwegian Ministry of Local Government and Regional Development in order to be valid. Budgets must be approved by either the ministry or the County Governor.

The registry was introduced in 2001. Prior to this, all counties and municipalities were required to have any debt and long-term contracts approved. The new law narrowed this to local divisions with an economic imbalance. Since not being in the ROBEK registry gives the municipality much more economic freedom, the councils usually aim to stay out of the registry. The registry has sometimes been described as a blacklist. Municipalities often cut costs by reducing public services, and conducting lay-offs to get out of the registry. Increasing revenue through property taxes have generally been opposed by the local politicians.

The rules determining whether a county will be entered into ROBEK are described in §60 of the law of municipalities and counties. According to this law, a county or municipality will be entered into the ROBEK registry if at least one of the following four criteria are met:

- a) The municipality or county council pass a budget where not all expenditures have been covered.
- b) The municipality or county council pass an economy plan where not all expenditures have been covered.
- c) The municipality or county council resolve that an account deficit will be covered in future budget years.
- d) The municipality or county do not follow their plan for covering a deficit.

As of October 2026, there are 35 municipalities in the ROBEK registry.

Budgetary troubles which land a municipality in the ROBEK registry are sometimes due to incurred losses from a large event, for example Vågsøy Municipality ended up on the ROBEK registry in 2009 following losses after hosting a port-of-call for the Tall Ships' Races. Narvik Municipality and Hattfjelldal Municipality were entered into ROBEK after the Terra Securities scandal.
