= Stein Arve Ytterdahl =

Norwegian politician (born 1951)

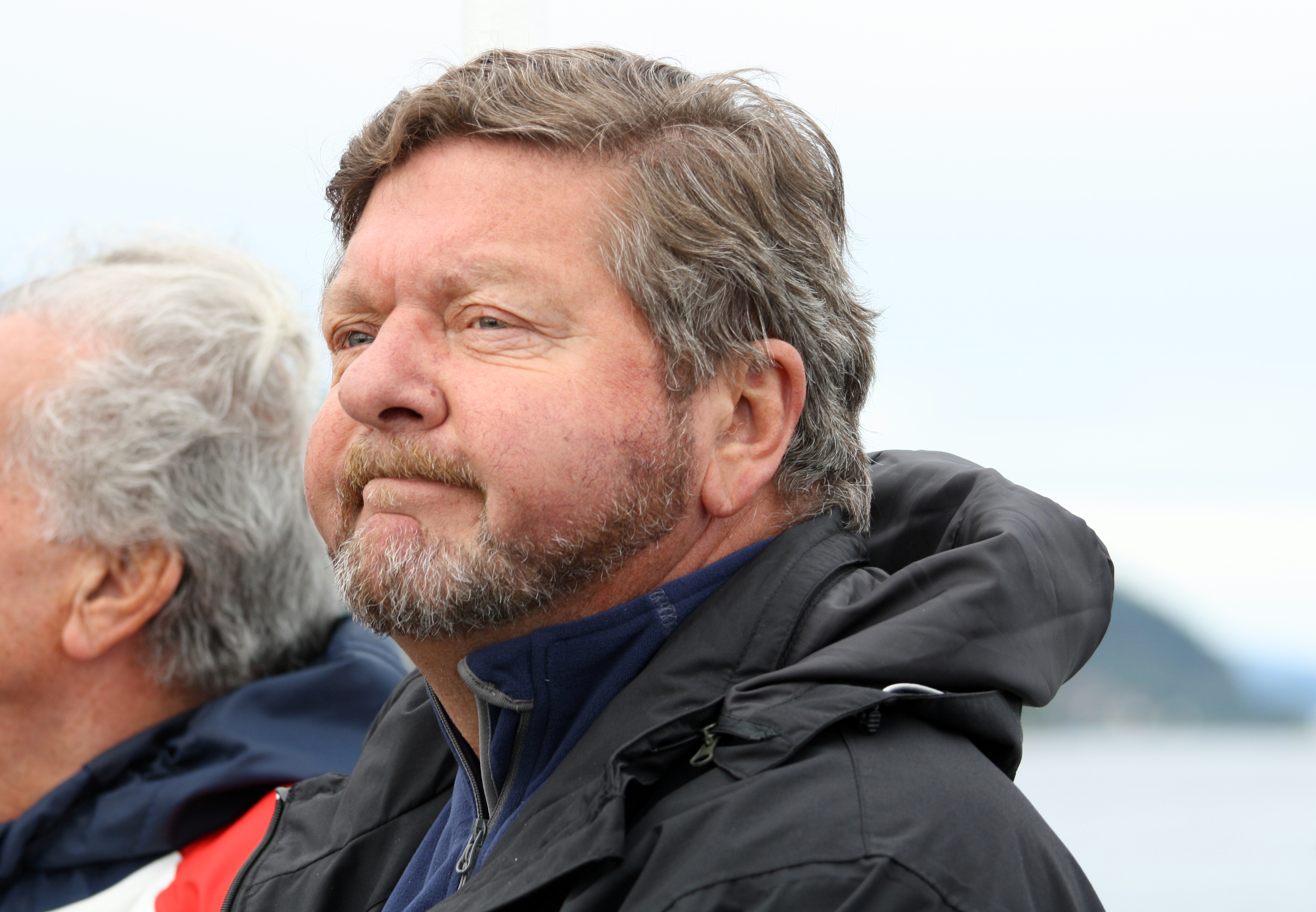
- Ytterdahl in 2012

County Governor of Agder
- In office 1 January 2016 – 31 December 2021
- Monarch: Harald V
- Prime Minister: Erna Solberg; Jonas Gahr Støre
- Preceded by: Øystein Djupedal (Aust-Agder); Ann-Kristin Olsen (Vest-Agder)
- Succeeded by: Gina Lund

Personal details
- Born: 4 October 1951 (age 75) Namsos, Nord-Trøndelag, Norway
- Citizenship: Norway
- Party: Labour
- Education: NTNU (1975)
- Occupation: Civil engineering
- Profession: Politician

Stein Arve Ytterdahl (born 4 October 1951) is a Norwegian politician and public servant. He served as the County Governor of Agder county from 2016 until 2022.

Ytterdahl was born in Namsos in 1951 and he received a degree in civil engineering in 1975 from the Norwegian University of Science and Technology in Trondheim. During his career, he worked in various management positions at Norsk Hydro in Porsgrunn Municipality and then Karmøy Municipality, at Elkem at the Lista Smeltverk and then as the CEO of Sauda Smelteverk. He also worked for Statoil, Bredero Price Norway, and Boliden AB in Odda. He also spent two years as the director of higher education at the BI Norwegian Business School.

He was a member of the Norwegian Labour Party. From 2007 until 2011, he served as the mayor of Farsund Municipality. From 2012 until 2015, he was a councilor for Trondheim Municipality. In 2016, he was named to the newly created post of County Governor of Aust- og Vest-Agder. The new post combined the old offices of County Governor of Aust-Agder and County Governor of Vest-Agder into one joint office in preparation for the planned merger of the two counties into Agder county in 2020. In 2020, his title changed to County Governor of Agder.

Government offices
Preceded by Øystein Djupedal as County Governor of Aust-Agder	County Governor of Aust- og Vest-Agder; 2016–2019	Office abolished Aust-Agder and Vest-Agder counties were merged and the new office of County Governor of Agder was established.
Preceded by Ann-Kristin Olsen as County Governor of Vest-Agder	County Governor of Aust- og Vest-Agder; 2016–2019	Office abolished Aust-Agder and Vest-Agder counties were merged and the new office of County Governor of Agder was established.
New office The offices of County Governor of Aust-Agder and County Governor of Vest-Agder were merged.	County Governor of Agder; 2020–2022	Incumbent
