= List of county governors of Oslo =

This is a list of the county governors (Fylkesmenn) of Oslo, Norway. Oslo was named Christiania and Kristiania throughout this entire period.

County governors of Kristiania
Start	End	Name	Born	Died
1815	1842	Shared governors with Akershus	-	
1842	1845	Fredrik Riis	1789	1845
1846	1857	Niels Arntzen Sem	1782	1859
1857	1874	Karelius August Arntzen	1802	1875
1874	1880	August Christian Manthey	1811	1880
1880	1905	Nils Mathias Rye	1824	1905
1905	1917	Otto Albert Blehr	1847	1927
1917	–	Shared governors with Akershus	-	
