= Kjell Borgersen =

Norwegian bandy player, footballer and journalist

Kjell Borgersen (born 24 August 1951) is a Norwegian bandy player, footballer and journalist.

== Career ==
He was born and grew up in Drammen. He started his youth career as both a football and bandy player in SBK Drafn, playing bandy for its senior team from 1968 to 1974 and winning three Norwegian championships. He also played bandy for Strømsgodset IF, as well as football for Konnerud IL from 1971 to 1977. He played as a goalkeeper. Borgersen started football refereeing in 1976 and was a team manager in Konnerud and Drafn. In 1976 he also issued the football book Avspark ("Kick-off").

Having taken secondary education, Borgersen was hired in the Drammen newspaper Fremtiden in 1974 and was promoted to sports editor in 1977. From 1987 to 2000 Borgersen was the director of information in the Football Association of Norway, concurrently working as team manager of the Norway national football team from 1990 to 1997.

In 1992 Borgersen was the chief media liaison for the UEFA Euro 1992 tournament. With up to 19 working hours a day, he had a logistical responsibility for 3,200 media representatives within the press, photography, TV and radio. In 1994, Norway qualified for the FIFA World Cup for the first time since the 1930s. The entire apparatus around the team had to be rebuilt on a professional level. Borgersen became a known figure among the unprecedentedly large media entourage. During the 1994 World Cup, Borgersen was noted for stepping in as a goalkeeper during certain training sessions, when the actual national team goalkeepers rested.

Borgersen later became operations manager of Ullevaal Stadium, the national team arena. Within the stadium premises, he founded the Football Museum. Borgersen was also a media officer for all UEFA Euro editions subsequent to 1992, from 1996 through 2016, as well as select UEFA Champions League matches. His last outing as a match delegate in the Football Association of Norway was the 2021 Eliteserien playoff, subsequently retiring at the age of 70.

== Personal life ==
He married in 1975 and assumed ownership of the family home south of Drammen city in 1983.
