= Gunstein =

Gunstein is a Norwegian given name. Notable people with the name include:

- Gunstein Anderson (1860–1926), Norwegian school inspector and politician
- Gunstein Bakke (born 1968), Norwegian novelist
- Gunstein Instefjord (born 1965), Norwegian organizational worker, political scientist, director, and politician
