= Johannes Brecke =

Norwegian businessman and politician (1877-1943)

- Born: 1 October 1877; Drammen
- Died: 28 April 1943 (aged 65)

Johannes Onsager Brecke (1 October 1877 – 28 April 1943) was a Norwegian businessperson and politician for the Conservative Party.

He was born in Drammen as a son of wholesaler Anders Brecke (1844–1922) and Caroline Onsager (1853–1888). In 1915 he married Fanny Lyche, a daughter of wholesaler Axel Lyche.

After finishing Kristiania Commerce School in 1895, he was hired in the company Harald Lyche & Co. Except for the year 1987 to 1900 when he took commercial training in England, France and Germany, he spent most of his career in this company. He was promoted to confidential clerk in 1914, and was chief executive officer from 1920 to 1922. From 1915 to 1922 he was also a director of Drammens Tidende og Buskerud Blad. From 1923 he was the co-owner of Harald Lyche & Co and Drammens Tidende og Buskerud Blad.

Brecke was a member of Drammen city council during several terms; 1910–1913, 1916–1919, 1925–1928 (executive committee) and 1931–1934. In the general elections of 1924 and 1927 he was elected as a deputy representative to the Parliament of Norway, representing the Market towns of Buskerud county. During the first term he served as first deputy for Sven Adolf Svensen and Haakon Irgens; during the second term just for Svensen as the Conservatives lost one of their seats to Labour.

He chaired the employers' association Kortevaregrossisternes Landsforening from 1929 to 1935, was a board member of Solberg Spinderi from 1914 and supervisory council member of Forsikringsselskapet Norge. He died in April 1943.
