= Bernhard Abrahamsen =

Norwegian politician

Bernhard Abrahamsen (21 December 1878 – 21 May 1945) was a Norwegian politician for the Labour Party.

He was born in Lierstranden; he was a son of municipal worker Martinius Abrahamsen (1853–1938) and Pauline Bernsen (1848–1916). He worked four and a half years at a paper factory, but spent most of his career as a carpenter.

Abrahamsen was a member of Drammen city council during several terms; 1916–1919, 1922–1925 and 1928–1931. In the general election of 1927 he was elected as a deputy representative to the Parliament of Norway, representing the Market towns of Buskerud county. He served one term, and became a full representative in January 1929 when MP Harald Haare died.
