= Market towns of Buskerud county =

The Market towns of Buskerud county (Norwegian: Kjøpstedene i Buskerud fylke) was an electoral district for parliamentary elections in Norway. It comprised the market towns (Norwegian: kjøpsteder) of Drammen, Hønefoss and Kongsberg in Buskerud county.

The district was established ahead of the 1921 Norwegian parliamentary election following the change from single member constituencies to plural member constituencies in 1919.

Following changes in the national policy on market towns in 1952, these electoral districts were abolished ahead of the 1953 Norwegian parliamentary election. Instead, each county became one electoral district, and for election purposes the towns were integrated into their respective counties.

== Representatives ==
The following representatives were elected from the Market towns of Buskerud county:

	Representative 1	Representative 2	Representative 3
1921	Rømcke, H	Johansen, A	Svensen, H
1924	Svensen, H	Vraa, A	Irgens, H
1927	Haare, A	Svensen, H	Nygaard, A
1930	Svensen, H	Vraa, A	Dokka, V
1933	Moss, A	Svensen, H	Nygaard, A
1936	Moss, A	Knudsen, H	Nygaard, A
1945	Watnebryn, A	Ingvaldsen, H	Sørensen, A
1949	Watnebryn, A	Ingvaldsen, H	Sørensen, A

Legend:

- NKP = Communist Party, Norges Kommunistiske Parti
- A = Labour Party, Det Norske Arbeiderparti
- SDA = Social Democratic Labour Party, Norges Socialdemokratiske Arbeiderparti
- RF = Radical People's Party (Worker Democrats), Det Radikale Folkeparti (Arbeiderdemokratene)
- KrF = Christian Democratic Party, Kristelig Folkeparti
- B = Farmers' Party, Bondepartiet
- V = Liberal Party, Venstre
- FV = Liberal Left Party, Frisinnede Venstre
- H = Conservative Party, Høyre
