= Ottar Brage Guttelvik =

Norwegian civil servant and politician

Ottar Brage Guttelvik (born 29 September 1953) is a Norwegian civil servant and politician for the Labour Party.

He graduated with a siv.øk. degree from the Norwegian School of Economics and Business Administration. He was the chief administrative officer of Eide Municipality from 1986 to 1990 and assisting chief administrative officer of Sør-Trøndelag County Municipality from 1990 to 1994. After the resignation of Aage Rundberget in 1993, Guttelvik served as acting chief administrative officer until Ole Johan Lund was hired. Guttelvik became director of Trondheim Regional Hospital in 1994. In 1995 he was appointed as State Secretary in the Ministry of Finance, which would merely be an intermezzo, as he left in 1996. In 1999 he was hired as chief administrative officer of Møre og Romsdal County Municipality. From 2004 his title was county director.

Civic offices
Preceded by Aage Rundberget	Chief administrative officer of Sør-Trøndelag County Municipality; 1993 (acting)	Succeeded by Ole Johan Lund
Preceded by Per Kibsgaard-Petersen	Chief administrative officer of Møre og Romsdal County Municipality; 1999–present	Incumbent
