= Andreas Nygaard =

Norwegian politician

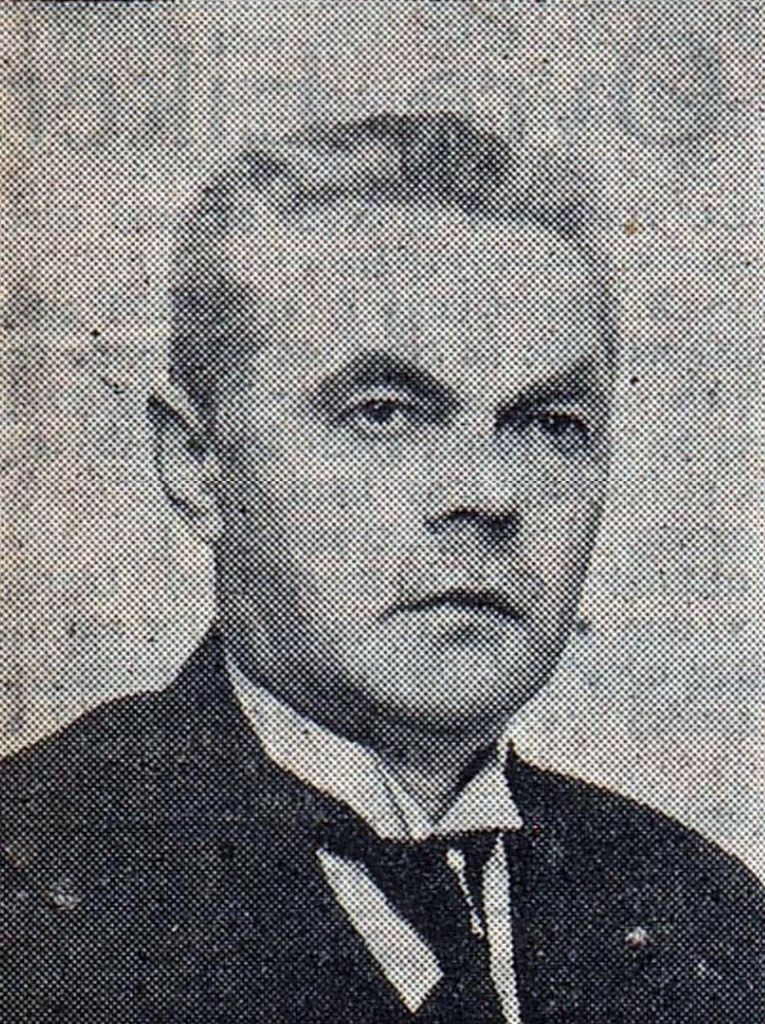
- Andreas Nygaard
- Born: 7 November 1878; Kongsberg, Norway
- Died: 5 September 1963 (aged 84)
- Occupation: Politician

Andreas Nygaard (born 7 November 1878 – 5 September 1963) was a Norwegian politician.

He was born in Kongsberg to Silver Works employee Ole Hansen Nygaard and Johanne Popperud. He was assigned with the Kongsberg Våpenfabrikk from 1894, from 1921 as supervisor. He was elected representative to the Storting for the periods 1928–1930, 1934–1936 and 1937–1945, for the Labour Party. From 1931–1933 he served as the deputy representative for Torgeir Olavson Vraa.
