= Reidar Due =

Norwegian politician (1922–2021)

Reidar Due (4 November 1922 – 29 October 2021) was a Norwegian politician for the Centre Party. He was born in Oslo and died in Levanger.

He was elected to the Norwegian Parliament from Nord-Trøndelag in 1977, and was re-elected on three occasions. He had previously served as a deputy representative during the term 1973–1977.

The son of a banker and a local politician, he graduated from Hvam School of Agriculture in 1943 and settled as a farmer in Levanger Municipality the same year. He was involved in local politics in Levanger Municipality from 1963 to 1971, serving the last term as mayor. From 1975 to 1979 he was a member of Nord-Trøndelag county council. His political career ended with the position of County Governor of Sør-Trøndelag, which he held from 1986 to 1993.

Political offices
Preceded by Einar Hole Moxnes	County Governor of Sør-Trøndelag; 1986–1993	Succeeded by Kåre Gjønnes
