= Abrahamse =

Abrahamse is a surname. Notable people with the surname include:

- May Abrahamse (1930–2025), South African soprano
- Taylor Abrahamse (born 1991), Canadian voice actor
- Veronica Abrahamse (born 1980), South African shot putter

== See also ==
- Abrahamsen, a Scandinavian surname
