= Becke =

Becke is a surname. Notable people with this surname include:

- Axel D. Becke (born 1953), Canadian physical chemist
- Daniel Becke (born 1978), German cyclist
- Edmund Becke (fl. 1550), British theological writer
- Florian Becke (born 1983), German bobsledder
- Friedrich Johann Karl Becke (1855–1931), Austrian mineralogist
  - Becke line test, an optical mineralogy technique developed by Friedrich Johann Karl Becke
- George Lewis Becke, (1855–1913), Australian Pacific trader, short-story writer and novelist
- Gregor Becke (born 1972), Austrian slalom canoeist
- Brigadier-General John Becke (1879–1949), British Royal Flying Corps and Royal Air Force officer
- Shirley Becke (1917–2011), British police officer
- William Becke (1916–2009), British army officer

== See also ==
- Becke Moui, a town in Saint David Parish, Grenada
