= Frank Jenssen =

Norwegian politician (born 1969)

Frank Josef Jenssen
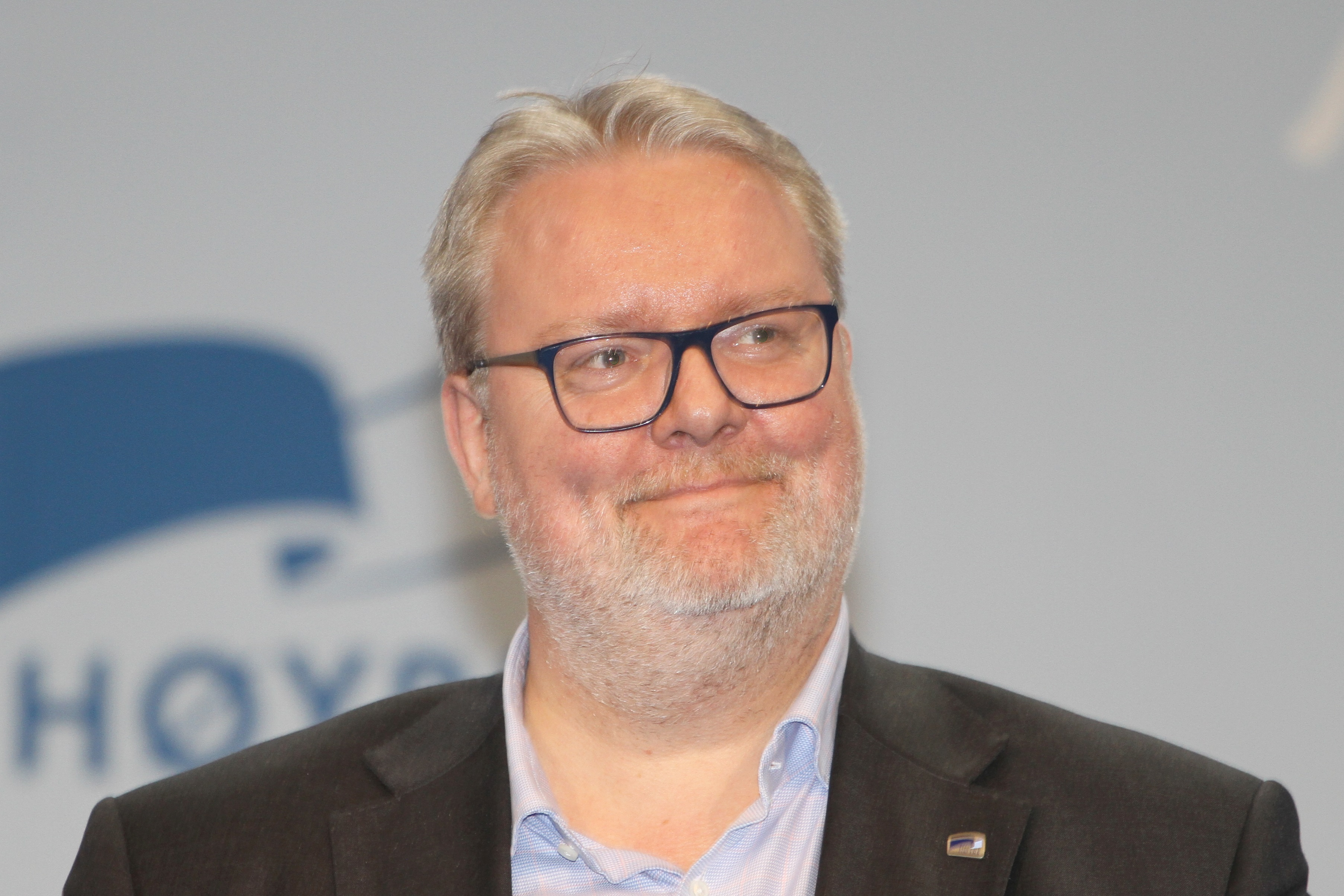

County Governor of Trøndelag
- Incumbent
- Assumed office 1 January 2018
- Monarch: Harald V
- Prime Minister: Erna Solberg; Jonas Gahr Støre
- Deputy: Gerd Janne Kristoffersen
- Preceded by: Position established

Member of the Norwegian Parliament
- In office 1 October 2013 – 30 September 2017
- Constituency: Sør-Trøndelag

Personal details
- Born: 11 August 1969 (age 56) Levanger Municipality, Norway
- Party: Conservative Party

Frank Josef Jenssen (born 11 August 1969) is a Norwegian politician for the Conservative Party. He was elected to the Parliament of Norway for Sør-Trøndelag in 2013 and in 2018, he became the first County Governor of the new Trøndelag county.

== Career ==
Jenssen was a local politician in Trondheim for a long time and served as political adviser to mayor Marvin Wiseth. He was State Secretary for Erna Solberg in the Ministry of Local Government and Regional Development from 2003 to 2005. He was the Conservative Party's candidate for mayor in Trondheim in the municipalities elections in 2003 and 2007, but the Labour Party with Rita Ottervik got the position of mayor both times.

He began working in a communication company in 2008 and subsequently became Director of Communication in the Norwegian Labour Inspection Authority.

In the 2013 Norwegian parliamentary election, he was nominated in second spot on the Sør-Trøndelag Conservative Party ballot and got elected as representative number 5 from Sør-Trøndelag. He was a member of the Standing Committee on Local Government and Public Administration.

In 2018, he became the first County Governor of the new Trøndelag county.

Political offices
New office Merger of Nord-Trøndelag and Sør-Trøndelag counties	County Governor of Trøndelag; 2018–present	Current holder
