= Johan Collett =

Norwegian politician (1775–1827)

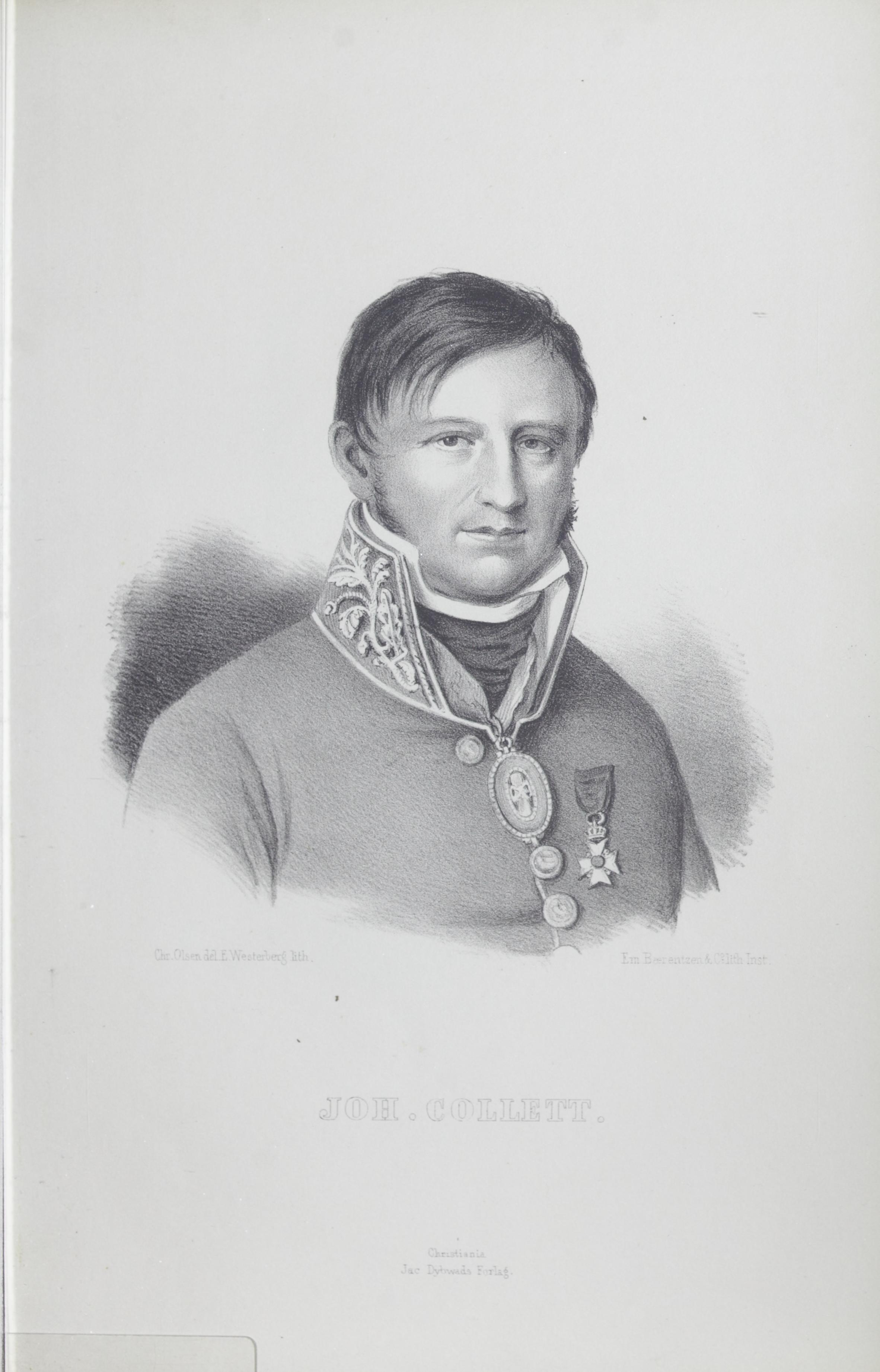
Johan Collett (1775–1827)

Johan Collett (22 March 1775 – 19 June 1827) was a Norwegian politician and public administrator. He served as a member of the Constituent Assembly at Eidsvold in 1814.

== Background ==
He was born at Rønnebæksholm in Næstved, Denmark, as the youngest living son of Johan Collett, Sr. (1734–1806) and Else Elisabeth Jensen (1746–1788). He had both older and younger siblings, but many died young. One of his brothers Jonas Collett was First minister of Norway.

== Career ==
Collett grew up in Copenhagen, Denmark and studied at the University of Copenhagen. He was a member of the Norwegian Society in the university and later one of the directors of the society. He studied law and graduated cand.jur. in 1796. In 1802, he enter public service as Bailiff in Buskerud, Norway. In 1814, Johan Collett was appointed County Governor of Buskerud as successor to his brother Jonas Collett. He was County Governor until his death in 1827, and was succeeded by Niels Arntzen Sem.

While he was County Governor, he was also elected to the Norwegian Parliament. He was a member of the Constituent Assembly at Eidsvold in 1814, which formed the Constitution of Norway, and then a member of the first parliamentary session later in 1814. He was later re-elected to serve three more terms in 1818, 1824 and 1827.

== Personal life ==
He married Christiane Birgithe de Stockfleth (1782–1829). The couple had eleven children. His son Johan Christian Collett became a politician. One of their daughters Sophie Augusta Collett (born 1811) married businessman Peter Severin Steenstrup, and a son Peter Jonas Collett (born 1813) married noted writer Camilla Wergeland. Through the latter marriage, Johan Collett was the grandfather of Robert and Alf Collett.

He was decorated Knight of the Order of Vasa in 1815, and Knight of the Order of the Polar Star in 1818. He died in Christiania (now Oslo) at age 52.

Preceded by Jonas Collett	County Governor of Buskerud; 1814–1827	Succeeded by Niels Arntzen Sem
