= Olaf Watnebryn =

Norwegian politician

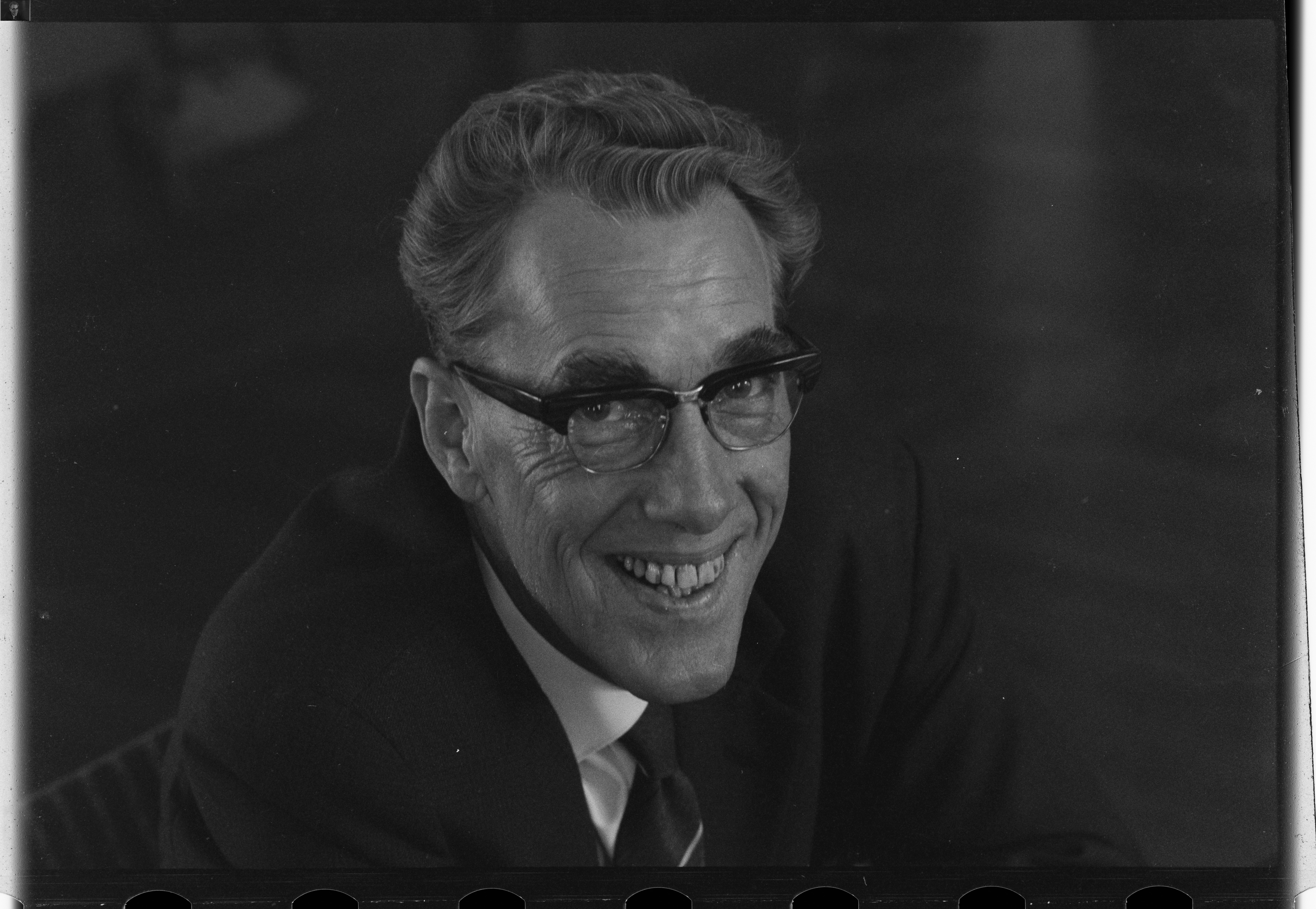

Olaf Fredrik Watnebryn (4 November 1908 – 6 June 1977) was a Norwegian politician for the Labour Party.

He was elected to the Norwegian Parliament from the Market towns of Buskerud county in 1945, and was re-elected on four occasions.

Watnebryn was born in Drammen and a member of Drammen city council in 1934–1937, and of its executive committee in the periods 1937–1940 and 1945–1947. His career in politics ended with the post of County Governor of Buskerud, which he held from 1962 to 1969.

Preceded by Arnold Dybsjord	County Governor of Buskerud; 1962–1969	Succeeded by Gunnar A. Larsen
