= Laila Øygarden =

Norwegian politician (1947–2025)

Laila Øygarden (6 June 1947 – 1 November 2025) was a Norwegian politician for the Labour Party.

== Life and career ==
Øygarden served as a deputy representative to the Parliament of Norway from Aust-Agder during the term 1977–1981. Following the 2007 elections, Øygarden became the new county mayor (fylkesordfører) of Aust-Agder. She sat through one term, until 2011. Before this, she was the deputy county mayor from 1955 to 2007.

She also chaired ØIF Arendal from 2011 to 2014.

Øygarden died on 1 November 2025, at the age of 78.

Political offices
Preceded by Oddvar Skaiaa	County mayor of Aust-Agder; 2007–2011	Succeeded by Bjørgulv S. Lund

== See also ==
- Odvar Nordli
- Reiulf Steen
- Gro Harlem Brundtland
