= Jørn Aksel Krog =

Norwegian civil servant

- Born: 11 April 1948; Trondheim, Norway
- Died: 3 March 2015 (aged 66); Trondheim
- Occupation: Civil servant

Jørn Aksel Krog (11 April 1948 – 3 March 2015) was a Norwegian civil servant.

He was born in Trondheim. He was secretary general of Norges Fiskarlag from 1979 to 1983, and manager of Feitsildfiskernes Salgslag from 1983 to 1989. From 1999 to 2011 he was permanent under-secretary of State in the Ministry of Fisheries and Coastal Affairs. He served as County Governor of Sør-Trøndelag from 2011 until his death in 2015.

Political offices
Preceded by Kåre Gjønnes	County Governor of Sør-Trøndelag; 2011–2015	Succeeded by Brit Skjelbred
