= List of county governors of Buskerud =

The County Governor of Buskerud (Norwegian: Fylkesmann i Buskerud) was the county governor for Buskerud county in Norway from 1675 until the office was abolished in 2019. The office of county governor is a government agency of the Kingdom of Norway which represents the national government in each county. The county governor is an appointed position. On 1 January 2019, this office was merged with the County Governor of Akershus og Oslo and County Governor of Østfold into the County Governor of Oslo og Viken (this was done in preparation for the merger of three counties in 2020).

The governor is the government's representative in the county. They carry out the resolutions and guidelines of the Storting and government. This is done first by the county governor, who performs administrative tasks on behalf of the ministries. Secondly, the county governor also monitors the activities of the municipalities and is the appeal body for many types of municipal decisions.

== History ==
In 1675, the government of Norway established Buskerud as an amt (or county). The county was subordinate to the Diocesan Governor of Christiania. In 1919, the name of the county was changed to Buskerud fylke. On 1 January 2019, the office was merged creating the new office of County Governor of Oslo og Viken in preparation for the merger of the neighboring counties of Akershus, Buskerud, and Østfold to form Viken county on 1 January 2020.

== Title ==
The word for county (amt or fylke) and the name of the county have both changed over time. Therefore the title of the officeholder has also changed.

- From 1675 until 31 December 1918, the title for each officeholder was Amtmann i Buskerud amt.
- From 1 January 1919 to 1 January 2019, the title for each officeholder was Fylkesmann i Buskerud.

== List of officeholders ==
Buskerud county had the following governors:

County governors of Buskerud
Start	End	Name
6 Aug 1675	1679	Ove Lange (1648–1692)
10 Oct 1679	1 Jan 1695	Mats de Tonsberg (1638–1705)
1 Jan 1695	1719	Poul Glud (1661–1719)
1719	24 May 1760	Just Must (1691–1760)
14 June 1760	4 Jan 1788	Andreas Fieldsted (1717–1788)
12 Mar 1788	29 Mar 1803	Herman Leopoldus Lange (1734–1803)
17 June 1803	19 May 1806	Emanuel Rafn (1765–1806)
31 Oct 1806	30 Mar 1813	Herman Wedel Jarlsberg (1779–1840)
30 Mar 1813	2 Mar 1814	Jonas Collett (1772–1851)
2 Mar 1814	1827	Johan Collett (1775–1827)
1828	1831	Niels Arntzen Sem (1782–1859)
1831	1857	Gustav Peter Blom (1785–1869)
1858	1882	Paul Peter Vilhelm Breder (1816–1890)
1882	1884	Thomas Cathinco Bang (1827–1902)
1884	1890	Nils Vogt (1817–1894)
1890	1902	Thomas Cathinco Bang (1827–1902)
1902	1928	Theodor Christian Stoud Platou (1858–1942)
1929	1935	Thomas von Westen Angell (1871–1935)
1935	9 May 1945	Jens Hundseid (1883–1965)
1945	1950	Nils Nilsen Thune (1880–1950)
1950	19 Oct 1962	Arnold Gerhard Dybsjord (?–?)
1962	6 Apr 1977	Olaf Fredrik Watnebryn (1908–1977)
1977	1979	Gunnar Alf Larsen (1919–2003)
1979	1989	Ragnar Christiansen (1922–2019)
1989	1999	Leif Haraldseth (1929–2019)
1999	30 Sept 2013	Kirsti Kolle Grøndahl (born 1943)
1999	2001	Jon A. Lea (born 1948) (acting for Grøndahl)
1 Oct 2013	31 Dec 2018	Helen Bjørnøy (born 1948)
Office abolished on 1 January 2019, see List of county governors of Oslo og Viken
