= Aage Rundberget =

Norwegian judge and civil servant (born 1947)

Aage Rundberget (born 19 January 1947) is a Norwegian judge and civil servant.

He grew up in Våler Municipality in Hedmark, and has four siblings. He took the cand.jur. degree at the University of Oslo in 1971. He worked as a civil servant in the Ministry of Justice and Statskonsult before becoming a judge. He was a deputy judge in Voss Municipality and an acting judge in the Bergen City Court. From 1986 to 1993 he was the chief administrative officer (fylkesrådmann) of Sør-Trøndelag County Municipality. He then became a presiding judge in Frostating Court of Appeal. From 1998 to 2000, while County Governor of Sør-Trøndelag Kåre Gjønnes was appointed in the first cabinet Bondevik, Rundberget served as Acting County Governor. In 2009 he was appointed as the first presiding judge in Frostating.

He has two sons, a cohabitant and two stepdaughters. He lives at Byåsen.

Civic offices
Preceded by Kåre Gisvold	Chief administrative officer of Sør-Trøndelag County Municipality; 1986–1993	Succeeded by Ottar Brage Guttelvik (acting)
Preceded by Roald Eriksen (acting)	County Governor of Sør-Trøndelag (acting); 1998–2000	Succeeded by Kåre Gjønnes
