= Olaf Sørensen =

Norwegian politician

Olaf Sørensen (3 August 1892 – 1 August 1962) was a Norwegian politician for the Labour Party.

He was elected to the Norwegian Parliament from the Market towns of Buskerud county in 1945, and was re-elected on two occasions.

Sørensen was born in Kongsberg and held various positions in Kongsberg city council between 1922 and 1959, except for a period between 1940 and 1945 during the German occupation of Norway. He served briefly as mayor in 1945.
