= Niels Arntzen Sem =

Norwegian politician

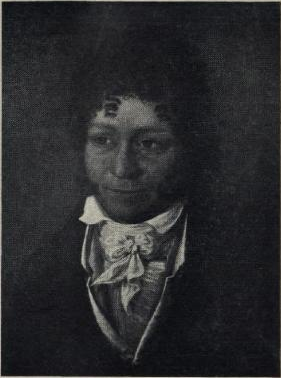

Personal details
- Born: 10 February 1781 Ringebu, Norway
- Died: 19 December 1859 (aged 78) Christianssand, Norway
- Citizenship: Norway
- Education: Cand.jur. (1806)
- Profession: Politician

Niels Arntzen Sem (10 February 1782 – 19 December 1859) was a Norwegian politician.

He was elected to the Norwegian Parliament in 1825 and 1827, representing the constituency of Stavanger Amt. He worked as district magistrate (sorenskriver) for Jæren from 1823 until 1828.

In 1828, he was appointed County Governor of Buskeruds Amt. While working in Buskerud, he was elected to the Norwegian Parliament to represent that county in 1830. In 1831, he was appointed as Diocesan Governor of Akershus stiftamt as well as County Governor of Akershus amt (one of its subordinate counties). He held that post until 1837 when he was transferred to another county. He then served as Diocesan Governor of Christianssand stiftamt as well as County Governor of Lister og Mandals amt (one of its subordinate counties). While working in Christianssand, he was elected to the Norwegian Parliament in 1842 and 1845.

In 1830 and 1845 he was President of the Storting, sharing the position with several people.

From 1846 to 1857 he was again appointed as the County Governor of Christiania Stiftamt. From October 1852 until 12 April 1853 he was an acting member of the Council of State Division in interim in Stockholm, founded during King Oscar I's illness.

Political offices
Preceded by Herman Wedel Jarlsberg	President of the Storting; 1830	Succeeded by Søren A. W. Sørenssen; Carl Valentin Falsen; Hans Riddervold
Preceded by Hans Riddervold; Søren A. W. Sørenssen	President of the Storting; 1845	Succeeded by Halvor Olaus Christensen; Georg Prahl Harbitz; Hans Riddervold; Carl Valentin Falsen
Government offices
Preceded by Johan Collett	County Governor of Buskeruds amt 1828–1831	Succeeded by Gustav Peter Blom
Preceded by Valentin Sibbern	Diocesan Governor of Akershus stiftamt 1831–1837	Succeeded by Hans Christian Petersen
Preceded by Valentin Sibbern	County Governor of Akershus amt 1831–1837	Succeeded by Hans Christian Petersen
Preceded by Oluf Borch de Schouboe	Diocesan Governor of Christianssand stiftamt 1837–1846	Succeeded by Carl Valentin Falsen
Preceded by Oluf Borch de Schouboe	County Governor of Lister og Mandals amt 1837–1846	Succeeded by Carl Valentin Falsen
Preceded by Fredrik Riis	Diocesan Governor of Christiania stiftamt 1846–1857	Succeeded by Karelius August Arntzen
