= Øystein Djupedal =

Norwegian politician (born 1960)

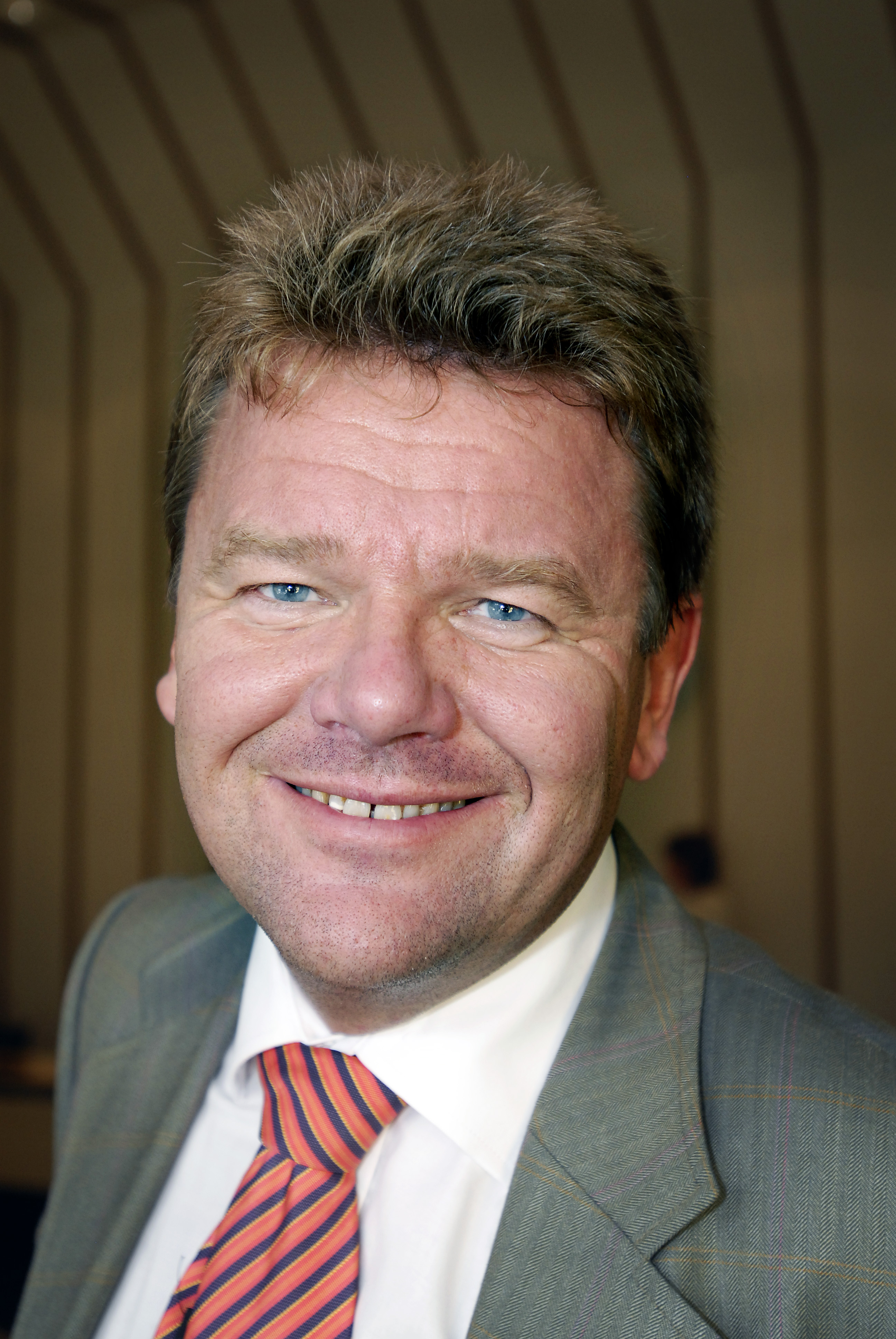
- Djupedal in 2006.

County Governor of Aust-Agder
- In office 1 October 2009 – 31 December 2015
- Monarch: Harald V
- Prime Minister: Jens Stoltenberg; Erna Solberg
- Preceded by: Svein Åril
- Succeeded by: Stein A. Ytterdahl

Minister of Education and Research
- In office 17 October 2005 – 18 October 2007
- Prime Minister: Jens Stoltenberg
- Preceded by: Kristin Clemet
- Succeeded by: Bård Vegar Solhjell

Member of the Norwegian Parliament
- In office 1 October 1993 – 30 September 2009
- Constituency: Sør-Trøndelag

Personal details
- Born: Øystein Kåre Djupedal; 5 May 1960 (age 65) Oslo, Norway
- Party: Labour
- Other political affiliations: Socialist Left (until 2015)
- Relations: Married
- Children: 3
- Profession: typographer

Øystein Kåre Djupedal (born 5 May 1960) is a Norwegian politician.

Djupedal was born in Oslo, Norway, and is the son of the linguist Reidar Djupedal. He is a Norwegian politician for the Socialist Left Party (SV), and was a member of Storting for Sør-Trøndelag County, where he has sat from the 1993 election until 2009. For two years, from 2005 to 2007, he was the Minister of Education and Research. He is also former deputy leader of the Socialist Left Party. From 2008 until 2015 he was the County Governor of Aust-Agder, although Svein Åril was the acting governor for him from 2008 until 2009 when he finished his Parliamentary term.

Government offices
Preceded by Svein Åril (Acting governor)	County Governor of Aust-Agder; 2009–2015	Office abolished See List of County Governors of Agder
