= Kåre Gjønnes =

Norwegian politician (1942–2021)

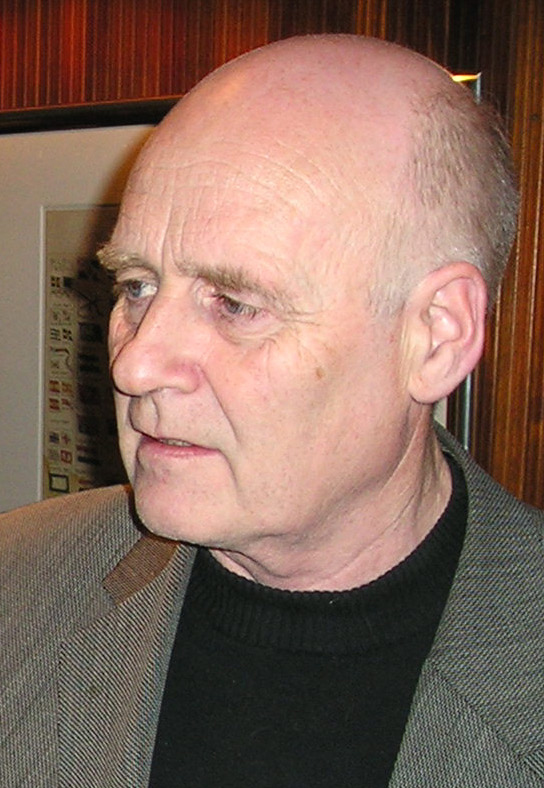
- Gjønnes in 2004

Minister of Agriculture
- In office 17 October 1997 – 17 March 2000
- Prime Minister: Kjell Magne Bondevik
- Preceded by: Dag Terje Andersen
- Succeeded by: Bjarne Håkon Hanssen

Minister of Nordic Cooperation
- In office 21 January 2000 – 17 March 2000
- Prime Minister: Kjell Magne Bondevik
- Preceded by: Peter Angelsen
- Succeeded by: Jørgen Kosmo

County Governor of Sør-Trøndelag
- In office 1993–2011
- Preceded by: Reidar Due
- Succeeded by: Jørn Aksel Krog

Member of the Norwegian Parliament
- In office 1 October 1985 – 30 September 1993
- Constituency: Sør-Trøndelag

Personal details
- Born: Kåre Erling Gjønnes; 30 January 1942 Orkdal Municipality, Sør-Trøndelag, Norway
- Died: 26 July 2021 (aged 79)
- Party: Christian Democratic

Kåre Erling Gjønnes (30 January 1942 – 26 July 2021) was a Norwegian politician for the Christian Democratic Party. He had been County Governor of Sør-Trøndelag from 1993, but went on leave from 1997 till 2000 to serve as Minister of Agriculture. He was also Minister of Nordic Cooperation in 2000.

Political offices
Preceded by Reidar Due	County Governor of Sør-Trøndelag; 1993–2011; He was on leave from 1997-2000. He was replaced by Roald Eriksen (1997-1998) and Aage Rundberget (1998-2000).	Succeeded by Jørn Aksel Krog
Preceded by Dag Terje Andersen	Norwegian Minister of Agriculture and Food; 1997–2000	Succeeded by Bjarne Håkon Hanssen
