= Kristen K. Flaa =

Norwegian politician (1925–2021)

Kristen K. Flaa (3 October 1925 – 10 January 2021) was a Norwegian politician for the Centre Party.

== Career ==
He was a farmer and chaired Aust-Agder Agrarian Association from 1955 to 1960. He served as mayor of Birkenes Municipality from 1972 to 1991 and county mayor of Aust-Agder from 1972 to 1975.

Flaa also chaired the boards of Fædrelandsvennen and Sørlandsbanken, and was a board member of Norske Melkeprodusenters Landsforbund from 1971 to 1982. The King's Medal of Merit in Gold was bestowed upon Flaa in 1992.
