= Harald Haare =

Norwegian trade unionist and politician

Harald Haare (3 April 1883 – 26 January 1929) was a Norwegian trade unionist and politician for the Labour Party.

He was born in Drammen as a son of head conductor in the State Railways, Lauritz Haare (1856–1938) and Karoline Bryn (1852–1929). He was a great-great-grandson of Founding Father Christopher Borgersen Hoen and first cousin of Knut Michael Spæren.

Like his father, he spent his career in the State Railways, going through the ranks and being promoted to head conductor in 1920. Haare was a member of Drammen city council from 1916, and chaired Drammen Labour Party from 1924 to 1925. He was deputy chair of the Norwegian Union of Railway Workers from 1924 and supervisory council of the Norwegian Confederation of Trade Unions from 1926.

He fielded as Labour's fourth ballot candidate in the 1924 Norwegian parliamentary election in the constituency Market towns of Buskerud county, but was not elected. In 1927 however, he was their first candidate and was elected to the Parliament of Norway. After serving through the year 1928, he died in January 1929 and was replaced by Bernhard Abrahamsen.
