= Arnt Ferdinand Moss =

Norwegian accountant and politician

- Born: 20 February 1880; Søndre Odalen, Norway
- Died: 25 April 1964
- Occupations: Accountant; Politician

Arnt Ferdinand Moss (February 1880 – 25 April 1964) was a Norwegian accountant and politician.

== Biography ==
Moss was born at Sundby in the Strøm Church parish in Søndre Odalen Municipality in Hedmark county, Norway. He was the son of Anton Jacob Fredriksen Moss (1848-1916) and Kari Pedersdatter Lilleseth (1849-1927). He attended the non - commissioned officer school (Underoffisersskolar) at Oslo in 1901 and was a non-commissioned officer (Underoffiser) in 1902.

He was treasurer of Drammen Gasworks 1911-1918. From 1918-21, he was business manager in A/S Fremtiden. In 1921 he took a position as municipal auditor for Drammen Municipality and from 1946 he was chief auditor in the municipality until he retired.

He was elected s a representative of Hønefoss, Drammen and Kongsberg to the Storting for the periods 1934–1936 and 1937–1945 with the Labour Party.
