= Lierstranda =

Village in Lier municipality, Norway

Coordinates: 59°44′53″N 10°15′09″E

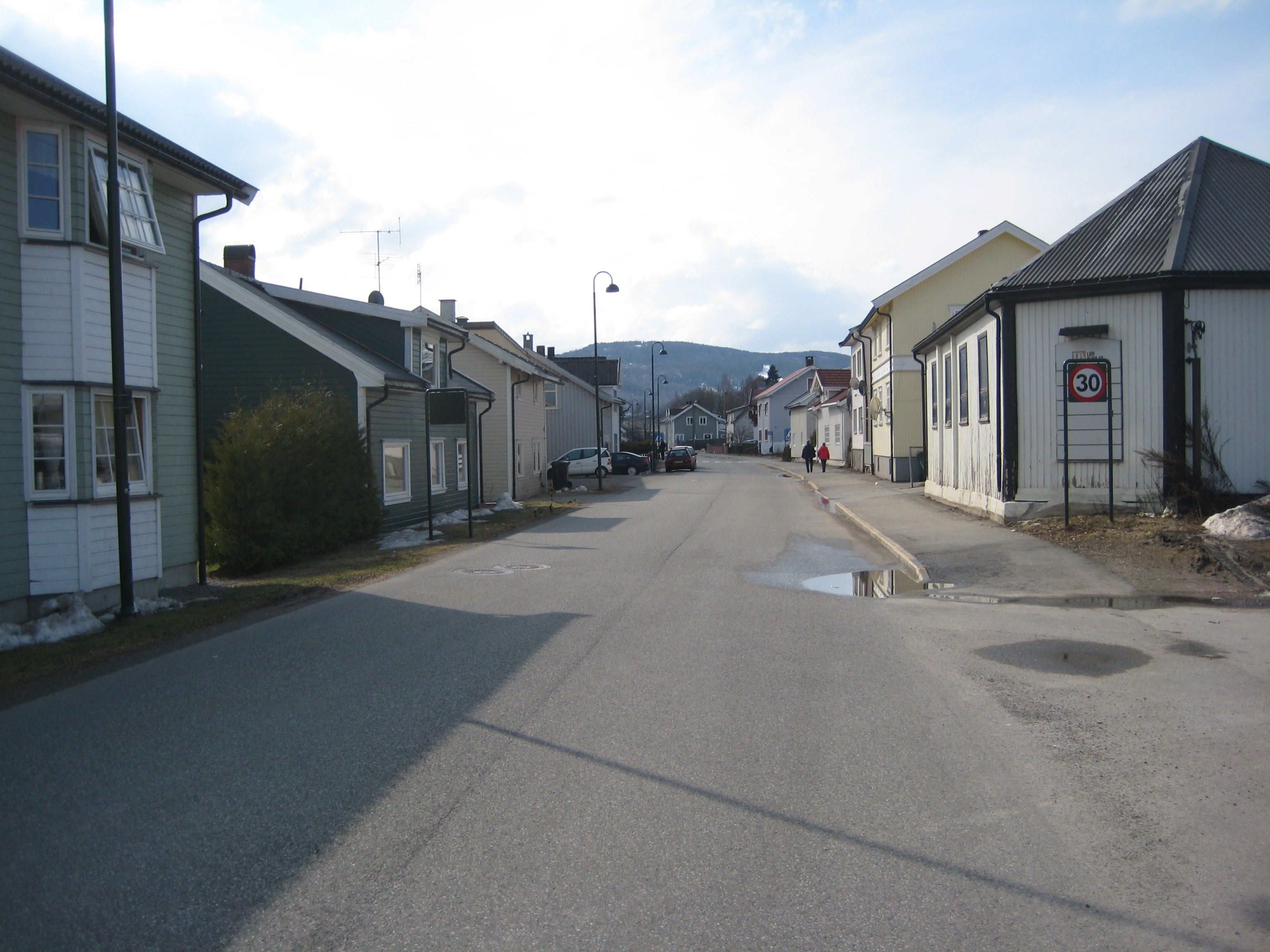
A street in Lierstranda

Lierstranda is a village in Lier municipality, Norway. Located immediately east of Drammen city along the Drammensfjord, it is a part of the urban area Drammen, which stretches into Lier. The part of the Drammen urban area that stretches into Lier has a population of 4,788.
