= Per Kibsgaard-Petersen =

Norwegian banker and civil servant (born 1941)

Per Kibsgaard-Petersen (born 27 March 1941) is a Norwegian banker and civil servant.

He was born in Ålesund and graduated with a siv.øk. degree from the Norwegian School of Economics and Business Administration in 1966. He had a career in fisheries and banking in the 1970s and 1980s, as secretary-general of the Norwegian Fishing Vessel Owners Association from 1971 to 1997 and director of Fiskernes Bank from 1978 to 1984. He was then a regional director in Kreditkassen from 1984 to 1989 and chief executive officer of Sunnmørsbanken from 1989 to 1990. He was also the consul for Finland from 1976 to 1977, and has been decorated as a Knight First Class of the Order of the White Rose of Finland.

He was the rector of the Norwegian School of Management in Møre og Romsdal from 1993 to 1996. He was then the chief administrative officer in Møre og Romsdal County Municipality from 1996 to 1999, then the director of Ålesund University College from 1999 to 2003.

He is the father of Schlumberger CEO Pål Kibsgaard-Petersen.

Civic offices
Preceded by Thor Sætherø	Chief administrative officer of Møre og Romsdal County Municipality; 1996–1999	Succeeded by Ottar Brage Guttelvik
