= Karelius August Arntzen =

Norwegian politician

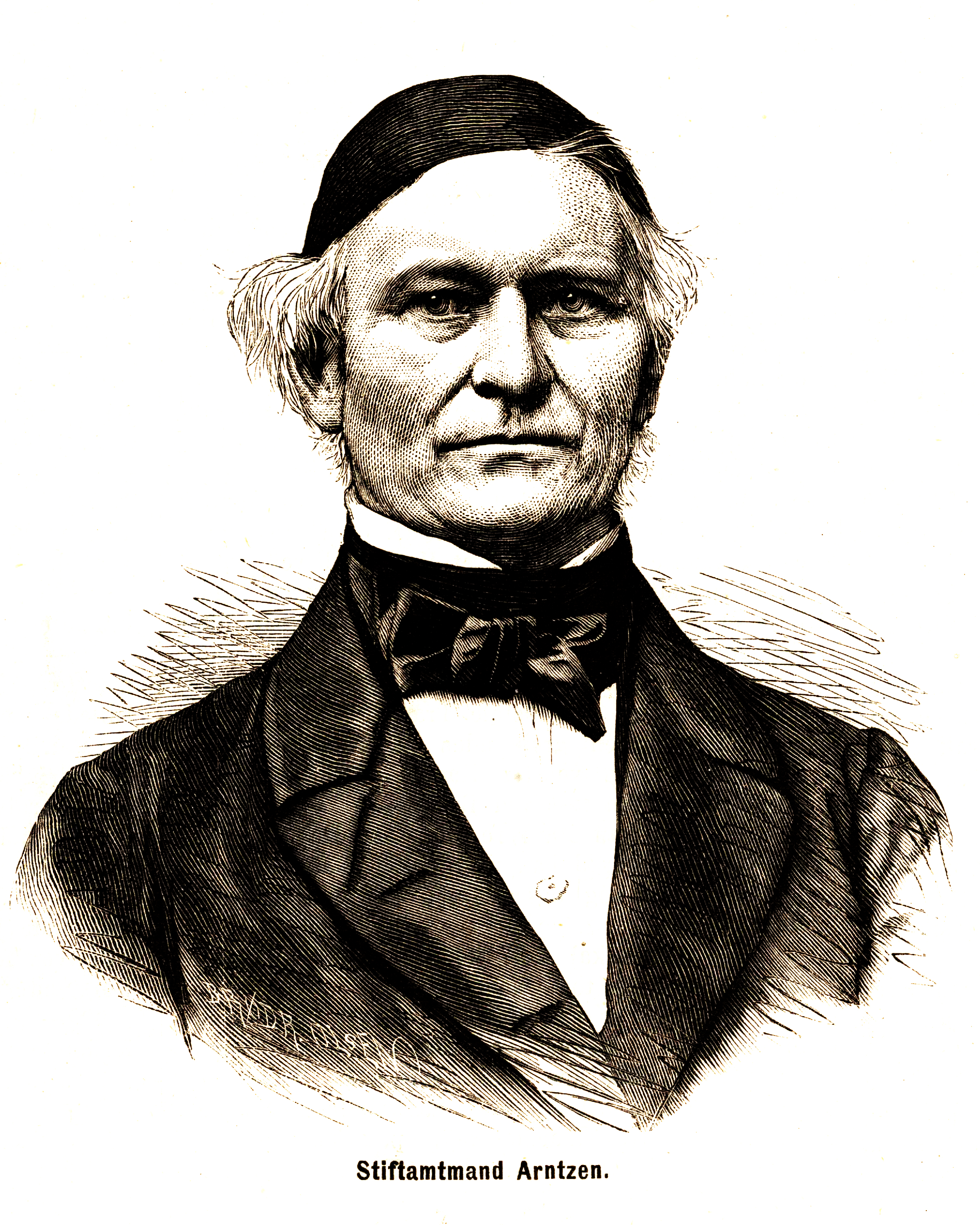
Karelius August Arntzen

Karelius August Arntzen (10 November 1802 – 1876) was a Norwegian jurist, civil servant and politician.

He was born in Copenhagen, where his father Andreas Arntzen took his jurist education. He became a student at the University of Copenhagen in 1820. In 1824 he was employed as copyist in the Ministry of Justice. In 1827, he graduated cand.jur. and took his law degree. In 1831 he became bureau chief and in 1833 expedition secretary.

He was later County Governor of Søndre Trondhjems Amt (now Sør-Trøndelag) from 1840 to 1857 and of Christiania (Oslo) from 1857 to 1874. He was appointed acting councillor of state in the interim government which was founded during the illness of King Carl XV during August 1861, but did not actually assume office. He died in 1876.

Civic offices
Preceded by Fredrik Riis	County Governor of Søndre Trondhjem; 1840–1857	Succeeded by Carl Frederik Motzfeldt
Preceded by Niels Arntzen Sem	County Governor of Christiania; 1857–1874	Succeeded by August Christian Manthey
