= Edmund Becke =

Edmund Becke (fl. 1550), Anglican theological writer, was ordained deacon by Bishop Nicholas Ridley in 1551.

== Works ==
In 1549 he supervised an edition of the Bible, "truly and purely translated into English and nowe lately with greate industry and diligence recognized". The volume was printed by John Day and William Seres, and was preceded by a long dedicatory address to "the most puisant and mighty prince Edwarde the Sixt", signed by his "most humble and obedient subiect Edmund Becke". An autograph copy of the address is among the Ashmolean manuscripts at Oxford. Becke there speaks of the book as "the frutes of myne industry", but it appears to be a re-print of T. Matthew's (i.e. John Rogers') "Bible" published in 1537, though it contains Tyndale's 1534 version of 2 Thessalonians chapter 2, not the 1535 revision that was carried into the Matthew bible. There are also significant variations in the tone and theology of the notes. It contains Tindal's preface to the New Testament.

Becke's chief original contribution consists of "a perfect supputation of the yeares and tyme from Adam unto Christ, proued by the Scriptures after the colleccyon of dyuers Authours". In 1551 Becke published two more Bibles, one printed by John Day, 'faythfully set forth according to y^{e} coppy of Thomas Matthewes translacion [really Taverner's Bible of 1539] wherevnto are added certaine learned prologues and annotacions for the better understanding of many hard places threwout the whole Byble'.

The dedicatory address and the various prologues which occur in Becke's earlier edition of the Bible are again inserted, and include the infamous "wife-beater's note" on 1 Peter 3, which advises men to beat their wives if they will not "do their duty":

"And if she be not obediente and healpeful unto hym, endevoureth to beate the fere of God into her heade, that thereby she may be compelled to learne her dutye and do it."

The other Bible followed the Matthew revision, and was printed by N. Hyll.

Becke's other works included: 1. Two Dyalogues wrytten in Latin by the famous clerke D. Erasmus of Roterodame, one called Polyphemus or the Gospeller, the other dysposing of thynges and names; translated into Englyshe by Edmond Becke. And prynted at Canterbury in Saynt Paules paryshe by John Mychell. 2. A Brefe Confutacion of this most detestable and Anabaptistrial opinion that Christ dyd not take hys flesh of the blessed Vyrgyn Mary nor any corporal substance of her body. For the maintenaunce whereof Jhone Bucher, otherwise called Jhon of Kent, most obstinately suffered and was burned in Smythfyelde, the ii. day of May Anno Domini M.D.L. (London, John Day, 1550, quarto.) The first tract is described by Becke as "the fyrste frutes of this my symple translacyon", and as undertaken at the request of "a nere cosyn of myne" for "such as are not lerned in the Latin tongue". It is undated; its publication at Canterbury suggests some ecclesiastical connection between Becke and that town. The second tract is a popular rhyming pamphlet, written to point the moral of the martyrdom of the anabaptist Joan Bocher, which is fully described by Stow. The tract has been reprinted by Mr. J. P. Collier in the second volume of his Illustrations of Early English Popular Literature (1864). (Note: Lewis's History of the English Translation of the Bible, prefixed to his edition of Wiclif's New Testament (1731), pages 44, 47) (Note: Tanner's Bibliotheca Britannico-Hibernica) (Note: British Museum Catalogue)
