= List of county governors of Østfold, Buskerud, Oslo og Akershus =

The county governor of Østfold, Buskerud, Oslo, and Akershus counties in Norway represents the central government administration in over this group of 4 counties. The office of county governor is a government agency of the Kingdom of Norway; the title was Amtmann (before 1919), then Fylkesmann (from 1919 to 2020), and then Statsforvalteren (since 2021).

Viken county (with its current borders) was established on 1 January 2020 after the merger of the old Buskerud, Akershus, and Østfold counties. The county-municipality of Oslo was not involved in this county merger, however, the Akershus and Oslo had been sharing a county governor since 1917. In preparation for the county merger, the government of Norway merged the offices of County Governor of Østfold, County Governor of Buskerud, and County Governor of Oslo og Akerhus into one office starting on 1 January 2019. On 1 January 2024, the county of Viken was divided into its three previous counties again, but this office was not divided and the name was changed to "Østfold, Buskerud, Oslo og Akershus".

The county governor is the government's representative in the county. The governor carries out the resolutions and guidelines of the Storting and government. This is done first by the county governor performing administrative tasks on behalf of the ministries. Secondly, the county governor also monitors the activities of the municipalities and is the appeal body for many types of municipal decisions.

== Name ==
The title of the office was originally Fylkesmann i Oslo og Viken but on 1 January 2021, the title was changed to the gender-neutral Statsforvalteren i Oslo og Viken. On 1 January 2024, Viken county was divided into three counties, so this office and its title were renamed to Statsforvalteren i Østfold, Buskerud, Oslo og Akershus.

== List of county governors ==
Østfold, Buskerud, Oslo og Akershus has had the following governors:

County governors of Østfold, Buskerud, Oslo og Akershus
Start	End	Name
1 January 2019	31 December 2024	Valgerd Svarstad Haugland (born 1956)
1 January 2025	15 August 2025	Ingvild Aleksandersen (acting, born 1968)
15 August 2025	current	Jan Tore Sanner (acting, born 1965)

== See also ==
For the county governors of this area prior to 2020, see:

- List of county governors of Akershus
- List of county governors of Buskerud
- List of county governors of Østfold
