= List of county governors of Akershus =

The county governor of Akershus county in Norway represented the central government administration in the county. In 1917, the county governorships in Akershus and Oslo were merged, creating the new county governor of Oslo and Akershus. The three county governorships of Østfold, Oslo and Akershus, and Buskerud were merged on 1 January 2019.

Valgerd Svarstad Haugland was the last county governor of Oslo and Akershus. She started in office on 1 December 2011 and continued as county governor of Oslo og Viken from 1 January 2019.

County governors of Akershus
Start	End	Name	Born	Died
1813	1815	Poul Christian Holst (acting)	1776	1863
1815	1822	Hans Hagerup Falbe	1772	1830
1822	1830	Valentin Christian Wilhelm Sibbern	1779	1853
1831	1837	Niels Arntzen Sem	1782	1859
1837	1839	Hans Christian Petersen	1793	1862
1840	1842	Fredrik Riis	1789	1845
1842	1855	Erik Røring Møinichen	1797	1875
1855	1858	Christian Birch-Reichenwald	1814	1891
1859	1895	Johan Christian Collett	1817	1895
1895	1918	Ole Andreas Furu	1841	1925
County governors of Oslo and Akershus
1919	1930	Hroar Olsen	1859	1941
1930	1943	Ingolf E. Christensen	1872	1943
1945	1955	Carl Platou	1885	1956
1955	1963	Trygve Lie	1896	1968
1964	1965	John Lyng	1905	1978
1965	1979	Petter Mørch Koren	1910	2004
1979	1988	Gunnar A. Larsen	1919	2003
1988	1989	Geir Engebretsen (acting)	1952	–
1989	1998	Kåre Isaachsen Willoch	1928	2021
1998	2001	Karin Moe Røisland (acting)	1944	–
2001	2001	Arne Bardalen (acting)		–
2001	2011	Hans J. Røsjorde	1941	–
2011	2018	Valgerd Svarstad Haugland	1956	–
