= Haakon Irgens =

Norwegian banker and politician

- Born: 13 June 1884; Øyer Municipality, Norway
- Died: 12 June 1973 (aged 88)
- Occupations: Banker; Politician

Haakon Irgens (13 June 1884 – 12 June 1973) was a Norwegian banker and politician.

== Personal life ==
Irgens was born in Øyer Municipality on 13 June 1943 to Jens Stub Irgens and Sofie Cahthinca Altschwager. He married Nora Broch Ellmar in 1915.

== Career ==
A banker, Irgens was manager of Odda Privatbank from 1913 to 1919, and of Kongsberg Sparebank from 1919.

He was elected representative to the Storting for the period 1925–1927, for the Conservative Party.
