= List of county governors of Trøndelag =

The county governor of Trøndelag county in Norway represents the central government administration in the county. The office of county governor is a government agency of the Kingdom of Norway; the title was Amtmann (before 1919), then Fylkesmann (from 1919 to 2020), and then Statsforvalteren (since 2021).

The diocesan county called Trondhjems stiftamt was established by the King in 1662, shortly after the area was re-conquered by the Kingdom of Denmark-Norway, taking it back from the Kingdom of Sweden. The seat of the stiftamt was in the city of Trondheim. In 1687, a new subordinate county called Trondhjems amt was created as one of several counties within the diocese. On 24 September 1804, the county was divided by royal resolution into two counties. The county of Nordre Trondhjems amt (renamed Nord-Trøndelag in 1919) was in the north and the county of Søndre Trondhjems amt (renamed Sør-Trøndelag in 1919) was in the south. These two counties existed until 1 January 2018 when the two counties were merged once again into the new Trøndelag county. The new county governor for Trøndelag lives and works in the town of Steinkjer, but also has offices in Trondheim.

The county governor is the government's representative in the county. The governor carries out the resolutions and guidelines of the Storting and government. This is done first by the county governor performing administrative tasks on behalf of the ministries. Secondly, the county governor also monitors the activities of the municipalities and is the appeal body for many types of municipal decisions.

== Names ==
The word for county (amt or fylke) has changed over time. From 1662 until its dissolution in 1802, the title was Amtmann i Trondhjems amt. On 1 January 2018, the office was re-created and at that time, the title was Fylkesmann i Trøndelag. On 1 January 2021, the title was again changed to the gender-neutral Statsforvalteren i Trøndelag.

== List of county governors ==
From 1687 until 1804, the Trondhjems amt county had the following governors. From 1804 to 2017, the county was split and so each of those counties had their own county governor (see the lists for those counties). Since 2018, the counties were reunited with one county governor once again.

County governors of Trondhjems amt:
Start	End	Name
1687	1700	Hans Kaas (1640–1700); Served concurrently as Stiftamtmann for Trondhjems stiftamt.
1700	1722	Iver von Ahnen (1657–1722); Served concurrently as Stiftamtmann for Trondhjems stiftamt.
1723	1726	Christian Reitzer (1665–1736); Served concurrently as Stiftamtmann for Trondhjems stiftamt.
1726	1735	Jacob Benzon (1688–1775); Served concurrently as Stiftamtmann for Trondhjems stiftamt.
1736	1744	Christian Ulrich von Nissen-Benzon (1691–1756); Served concurrently as Stiftamtmann for Trondhjems stiftamt.
1744	1747	Christian de Stockfleth (1715–1750); Served concurrently as Stiftamtmann for Trondhjems stiftamt.
1747	1766	Frederik Rantzau (1727–1780); Served concurrently as Stiftamtmann for Trondhjems stiftamt.
1766	1772	Diderik Otto von Grambow (1732–1773); Served concurrently as Stiftamtmann for Trondhjems stiftamt.
1772	1772	Georg Christian Oeder (1728–1791); Served concurrently as Stiftamtmann for Trondhjems stiftamt.
1772	1783	Johan Vibe von der Osten (1708–1800); Served concurrently as Stiftamtmann for Trondhjems stiftamt.
1783	1786	Wilhelm Frimann Koren (1723–1788); Served concurrently as Stiftamtmann for Trondhjems stiftamt.
1786	1796	Thorkild Fjeldsted (1741–1796); Served concurrently as Stiftamtmann for Trondhjems stiftamt.
1796	1802	Gebhard Moltke, Greve of Moltke (1764–1851); Served concurrently as Stiftamtmann for Trondhjems stiftamt.
1802	1804	Frederik Adeler (1764–1816); Served concurrently as Stiftamtmann for Trondhjems stiftamt.
Office abolished on 24 September 1804. See *List of county governors of Nord-Trøndelag *List of county governors of Sør-Trøndelag
Office re-established on 1 January 2018. County governors of Trøndelag fylke:
1 Jan 2018	present	Frank Jenssen (born 1969)
