= Torgeir Vraa =

Norwegian politician

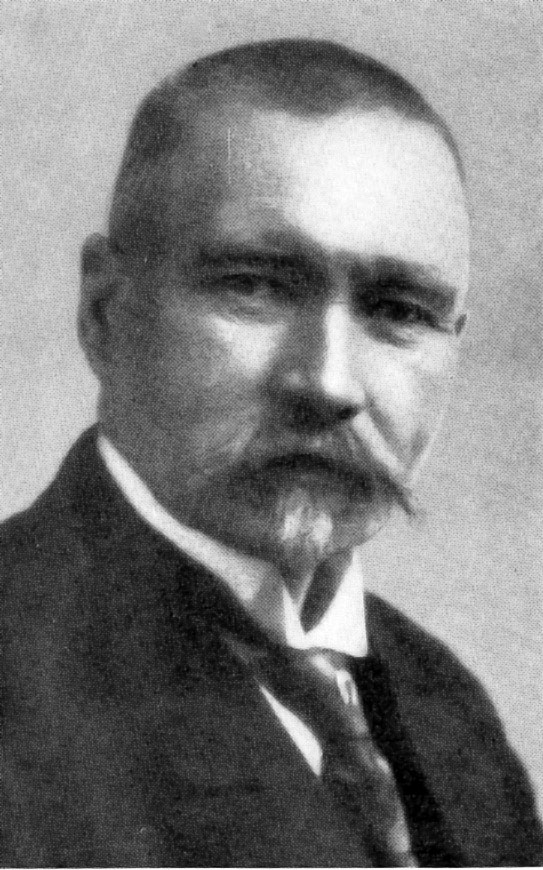
Torgeir Vraa

Torgeir Tarjei Olavsson Vraa (16 May 1868 – 21 June 1934) was a Norwegian educator, newspaper editor and politician for the Labour Party.

== Biography ==
He was born on the Rui farm in Moland Municipality in Telemark. Upon graduating from Asker Seminary in 1889, he was hired as a school teacher in Modum Municipality. He married Maren Sofie Hansen (1870–1935) in October 1892. Vraa joined the Liberal Party, where Christopher Hornsrud was a leading figure on the left wing, but in 1897, the two joined the Norwegian Labour Party.

From 1902 to 1904, he was a journalist in the Labour Party newspaper Social-Demokraten in Kristiania (now Oslo). From 17 May 1905, he was the first editor-in-chief of the newly established Labour Party newspaper Fremtiden in Drammen, where he contributed to defining local journalism as a genre.

Vraa was elected to the Parliament of Norway in 1906 for the constituency Strømsø og Tangen. He prevailed in the second round of voting, having won the endorsement from the local Liberals who pulled their candidate. He was a member of the Protocol Committee. In the next election in 1909 he lost this support and was not re-elected. He instead served as deputy mayor of Drammen from 1910 to 1913. In total, he was a city council member from 1910 to 1919 and 1922 to 1928. He was also county chairman for a period, and national board member from 1904 to 1912 and 1918 to 1920.

He did not join any splinter party in 1921 to 1923, but stayed in the Labour Party, and gained a parliamentary seat in the elections 1924 and 1930, representing the constituency Market towns of Buskerud county (Drammen, Hønefoss and Kongsberg). For both terms he was a member of the Standing Committee on Forestry and Waterways. He died in Drammen and was editor-in-chief until his death. The collected writings Artikler og petiter were published posthumously in 1936.

== Legacy ==
A statue of him by Dyre Vaa was raised at Gamle Kirkeplass in Drammen during 1936. Streets or squares have also been named after him including Torgeir Vraas plass in Drammen and Torgeir Vraas plass in Skien.

Media offices
New office	Chief editor of Fremtiden; 1905–1934	Succeeded by
