= List of county governors of Sør-Trøndelag =

The county governor of Sør-Trøndelag county in Norway represented the central government administration in the county. The office of county governor is a government agency of the Kingdom of Norway; the title was Amtmann (before 1919) and then Fylkesmann (after 1919). The county of Søndre Trondhjems amt (re-named Sør-Trøndelag in 1919) was established by royal resolution on 24 September 1804 when the old Trondhjems amt was divided in two. The county existed until 1 January 2018 when the two counties were merged once again as Trøndelag county. The new county governor for Trøndelag will live and work in the town of Steinkjer.

The county governor is the government's representative in the county. The governor carries out the resolutions and guidelines of the Storting and government. This is done first by the county governor performing administrative tasks on behalf of the ministries. Secondly, the county governor also monitors the activities of the municipalities and is the appeal body for many types of municipal decisions.

== List of county governors ==
The following is a list of the county governors of Sør-Trøndelag:

County governors of Sør-Trøndelag
Start	End	Name
1804	1810	Erik Must Angell (1744–1814); Served concurrently as Stiftamtmann for Trondhjems stiftamt.
1810	1832	Frederich Christopher Trampe, Count of Trampe (1779–1832); Served concurrently as Stiftamtmann for Trondhjems stiftamt.
1832	1840	Fredrik Riis (1789–1845); Served concurrently as Stiftamtmann for Trondhjems stiftamt.
1840	1857	Karelius August Arntzen (1802–1875); Served concurrently as Stiftamtmann for Trondhjems stiftamt.
1857	1894	Carl Frederik Motzfeldt (1808–1902); Served concurrently as Stiftamtmann for Trondhjems stiftamt.
1894	1907	Lars Otto Roll Grundt (1843–1907); Served concurrently as Stiftamtmann for Trondhjems stiftamt.
1907	1921	Harald Bothner (1850–1924); Served concurrently as Stiftamtmann for Trondhjems stiftamt (1907-1918).
1921	1940	Odd Sverressøn Klingenberg (1871–1944)
1940	1947	Johan Cappelen (1889–1947)
1940	1942	Anton Frederik W. Jakhelln Prytz (1878–1945) (WWII Occupied government)
1942	1945	Otto Johansen Grundtvig (1901–1966) (WWII Occupied government)
1948	1958	Ivar Skjånes (1888–1975)
1958	1963	Thor Skrindo (1910–1992)
1963	1974	Nils Kristian Lysø (1905–1977)
1974	1986	Einar Hole Moxnes (1921–2006)
1986	1993	Reidar Due (born 1922)
1993	2011	Kåre Gjønnes (1942–2021)
1997	1998	Roald Eriksen (born 1933) (acting for Gjønnes)
1998	2000	Aage Rundberget (born 1947) (acting for Gjønnes)
2011	2015	Jørn Aksel Krog (1948–2015)
2015	2016	Brit Skjelbred (born 1949) (acting)
2016	2017	Brit Skjelbred (born 1949)
Office abolished on 1 January 2018.

- For the county governors of this area before 1804, see List of county governors of Trøndelag.
- For the county governors of this area after 2017, see List of county governors of Trøndelag.
