= Erik Must Angell =

Norwegian jurist and politician

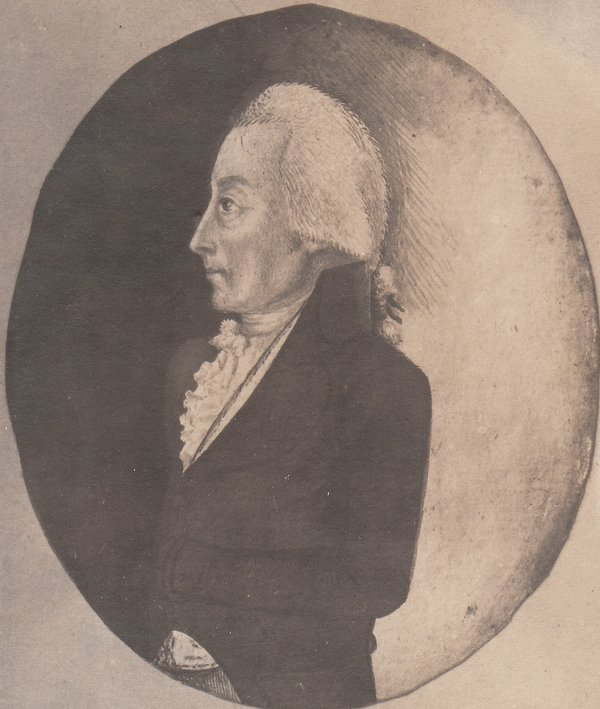
Erik Must Angell

Erik Must Angell (15 September 1744 – 28 August 1814) was a Norwegian jurist and politician.

He graduated both as cand.theol. and cand.jur. He became burgomaster of Throndhjem in 1774, magistrate president in 1788 and judge in 1800. He was also a member of the Royal Norwegian Society of Sciences and Letters. He was then County Governor of Søndre Throndhjems amt (today named Sør-Trøndelag) from 1810 to 1814.

He was the brother of local dean Jonas Angell. He married Anna Marie Lysholm (1757–1826) in 1780.

Civic offices
Preceded by Frederik Adeler	County Governor of Søndre Trondhjem; 1804–1810	Succeeded by Frederik Christoffer, greve af Trampe
