= Fremtiden =

Norwegian newspaper

Fremtiden was a Norwegian newspaper, published in Drammen, Norway, between 1905 and 2000. It was an official publication of Norwegian Labour Party in Buskerud.

== History and profile ==
Fremtiden was started in 1905. Its first editor was Torgeir Vraa, who edited the newspaper from its start until his death in 1934. The paper became the main organ for the Norwegian Labour Party in Buskerud. During the 1980s its circulation was around 20,000 copies. Fremtiden ceased to appear in 2000.

The newspaper reappeared as Dagsavisen Fremtiden in 2013. This is a local edition of Dagsavisen. It is partly written by staff in Drammen while the rest of the newspaper consists of material from Dagsavisen.
