= List of county governors of Agder =

The county governor of Agder county in Norway represents the central government administration in the county. The office of county governor is a government agency of the Kingdom of Norway; the title was Amtmann (before 1919), then Fylkesmann (from 1919 to 2020), and then Statsforvalteren (since 2021).

Agder county (with its current borders) was established on 1 January 2020 after the merger of the old Aust-Agder and Vest-Agder counties. In anticipation for this merger, the government of Norway merged the offices of County Governor of Aust-Agder and County Governor of Vest-Agder into one office starting on 1 January 2016.

The county governor is the government's representative in the county. The governor carries out the resolutions and guidelines of the Storting and government. This is done first by the county governor performing administrative tasks on behalf of the ministries. Secondly, the county governor also monitors the activities of the municipalities and is the appeal body for many types of municipal decisions.

== Name ==
From 1 January 2016 until 31 December 2019 the title was Fylkesmann i Aust- og Vest-Agder fylker. Since 1 January 2020, after the county merger, the title was changed to Fylkesmann i Agder fylke. Then on 1 January 2021, the title was changed again to the gender-neutral Statsforvalteren i Agder fylke.

== List of county governors ==
Agder county has had the following governors:

County governors of Agder
| Start | End | Name |
|---|---|---|
| 1 Jan 2016 | 31 Dec 2021 | Stein Arve Ytterdahl (born 1951) |
| 1 Jan 2022 | present | Gina Lund (born 1962) |

== See also ==
For the county governors of this area prior to 2016, see:

- List of county governors of Aust-Agder
- List of county governors of Vest-Agder
