= Gina Lund =

Norwegian politician (born 1962)

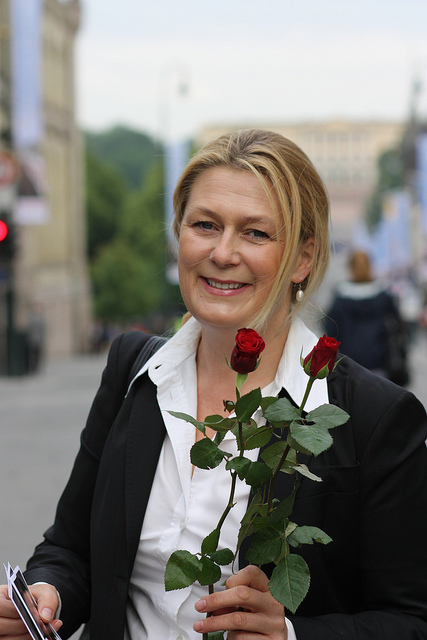
Gina Lund.

Gina Lund (born 1962) is a Norwegian civil servant and politician for the Labour Party. She is currently serving as the county governor of Agder.

She finished secondary education in Tvedestrand in 1981, and worked one year as a secretary in the Workers' Youth League. She graduated from the University of Oslo with a cand.jur. degree in 1991. She is a daughter-in-law of Knut Frydenlund.

She was a political adviser in the Ministry of Labour and Administration from 1991 to 1992. She worked in the Norwegian Refugee Council from 1992 to 1994 and 2004 to 2005. She was an adviser and head of department in the Ministry of Justice from 1995 to 2000, then in various companies until 2004. She lived in the United States from 2002 to 2005.

She was a head of department in the Ministry of Local Government, the Ministry of Labour and the Ministry of Justice from 2007 to 2009. In 2009 she was appointed as a State Secretary in the Ministry of Labour as a member of Stoltenberg's Second Cabinet. She resigned in February 2013.

She has been deputy chair of CARE Norway.
