= Gebhard Moltke =

Danish nobleman and civil servant

Gebhard Moltke (20 February 1764 – 20 December 1851) was a Danish nobleman and civil servant. He was born in Copenhagen, a son of landowner Adam Gottlob, Count Moltke to Bregentved. He served as stiftsamtmann in Trondheim from 1796 to 1802, and in Akershus from 1802 to 1809. He moved to Funen in 1809, where he had large land properties. He inherited the estate Moltkenborg from his mother, and later bought the neighbour estate Mullerup. He was a chamberlain from 1784, and was decorated Knight of the Order of the Dannebrog, and of the Order of the Elephant.
