= County governor (Norway) =

Norwegian government agency

Emblem of the County Governors

The county governor (Bokmål: statsforvalteren; Nynorsk: statsforvaltaren, lit. 'state administrator' in English) is a Norwegian government agency that represents the central government administration in all counties of Norway. Responsible for a number of supervision and management duties, the governor is the representative of the king and the government of Norway in each county, functioning as the connection between the state and the municipalities. The county governor is subordinate to the Ministry of Local Government and Modernisation, but also to the other ministries in their respective duties.

The main responsibilities of the governor include controlling and being an instance of appeal for municipal decisions and the main instance for exercising state regulation of agriculture and local environmental impact. The governor is also responsible for civil matters including marriage, divorce and citizenship. if a municipality fails to balance its budget, the governor enters the municipality into the Register for Governmental Approval of Financial Obligations and obtain some control over the municipality's finances.

The governor is part of the executive branch and is formally appointed by the King-in-Council. The governor of Svalbard has wider authorities, including for the police. The (appointed) county governor should not be confused with the (elected) Chair of the County Council, more commonly known as the county mayor (fylkesordfører).

== History ==
The county governor has been an institution since the 12th century, though the institution has had many names, including sysselmann, lensmann, amtmann, fylkesmann and now the gender neutral statsforvalter.

Prior to 1919, the county governor (Norwegian: amtmann) reported to the diocesan governor (Norwegian: stiftamtmann), who oversaw all of the counties with a diocese in Norway. The role of diocesan governor was abolished on 1 January 1919. Also on that date, the title of amtmann was changed to fylkesmann. On 1 January 2021, the title of fylkesmann was changed to the new, gender neutral statsforvalter (lit. state administrator).

In 1976, the county municipality was created as a separate, elected body that oversees each county and the role of the county governor was changed to accommodate this.

== Governors ==
After the Solberg Cabinet's regional reforms and the partial reversal of this by the Støre Cabinet, the number of county governors does not correspond to the number of counties nor constituencies anymore. There are 10 County Governor agencies for 15 counties. The following agencies are as follows:

Agency	Counties within agency	Constituencies within agency	Agency seat	Governor
Agder	Agder	Aust-Agder; Vest-Agder	Arendal	Gina Lund
Innlandet	Innlandet	Hedmark; Oppland	Lillehammer	Knut Storberget
Møre og Romsdal	Møre og Romsdal	Møre og Romsdal	Molde	Else-May Norderhus
Nordland	Nordland	Nordland	Bodø	Tom Cato Karlsen
Østfold, Buskerud, Oslo og Akershus	Akershus; Buskerud; Oslo; Østfold	Akershus; Buskerud; Oslo; Østfold	Moss	Ingvild Aleksandersen (acting)
Rogaland	Rogaland	Rogaland	Stavanger	Bent Høie
Troms og Finnmark	Finnmark; Troms	Finnmark; Troms	Vadsø	Runar Sjåstad
Trøndelag	Trøndelag	Nord-Trøndelag; Sør-Trøndelag	Trondheim	Frank Jenssen
Vestfold og Telemark	Telemark; Vestfold	Telemark; Vestfold	Tønsberg	Trond Rønningen
Vestland	Vestland	Hordaland; Sogn og Fjordane	Hermansverk	Liv Signe Navarsete

In recent times, county governors are former politicians or have a background in the police force. It is uncommon for governors to hold an office for less than a decade, and many of the present governors were appointed in the 1990s. It has often been seen as a way to retire former high-office politicians from active political duty, and at the same time issue a high-standing position in the public administration at their home place.

Although almost all county governors are former active politicians, it has been regarded as customary that an incumbent county governor does not participate in partisan politics.

== See also ==
- Diocesan governor (Norway)
