= Adam Johan Frederik Poulsen Trampe =

Dano-Norwegian lawyer and politician

Adam Johan Frederik Poulsen The Greve of Trampe
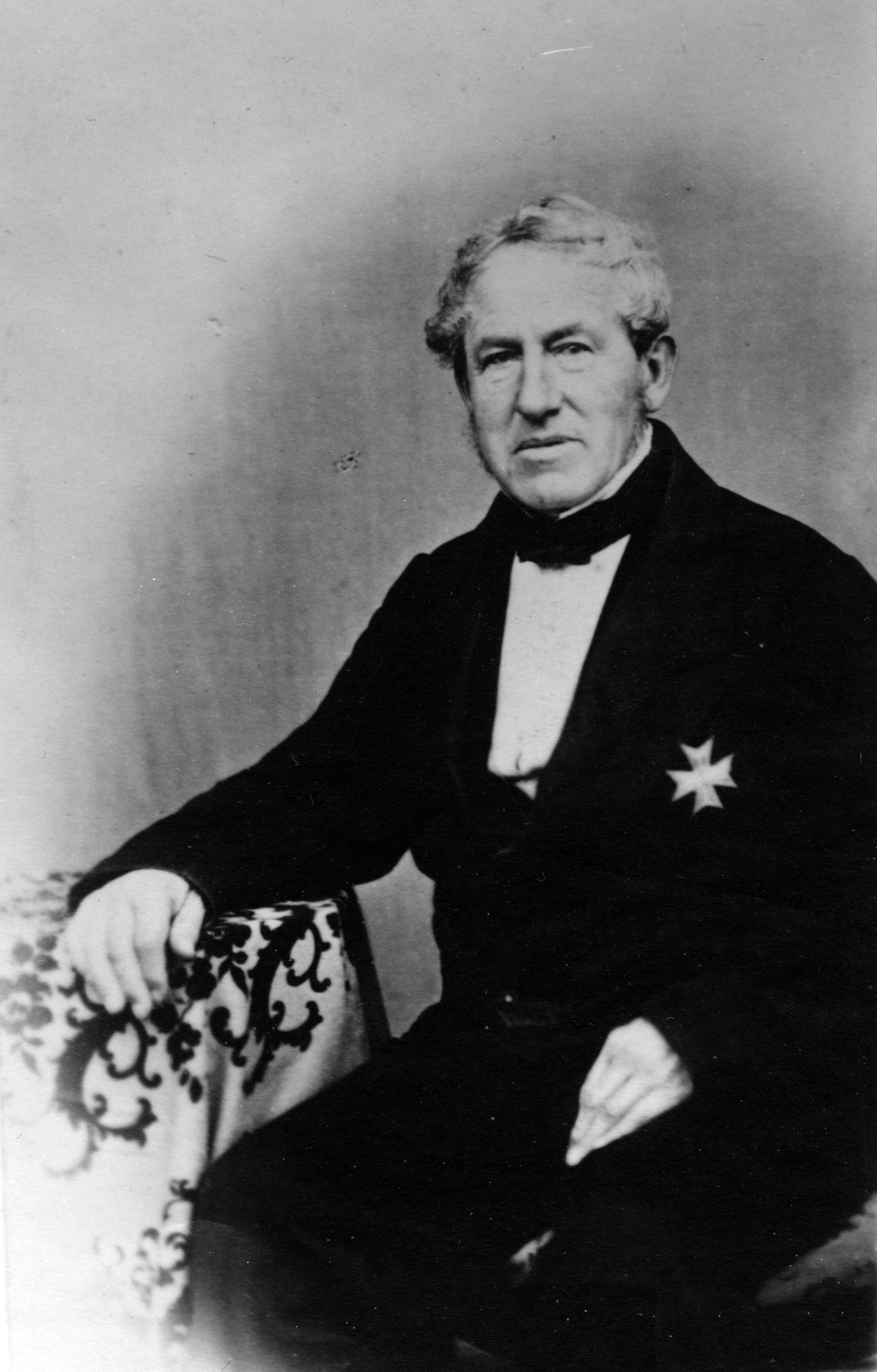

Governor of Nordre Trondhjems amt
- In office 1833–1857
- Preceded by: Christen Elster
- Succeeded by: Fredrik August Wessel-Berg

Governor of Nordlands amt
- In office 1829–1833
- Preceded by: Johan Ernst Berg
- Succeeded by: Lars Bastian Ridder Stabell

Personal details
- Born: 10 September 1798 Copenhagen, Denmark
- Died: 8 August 1876 (aged 77) Trondhjem, Norway
- Citizenship: Denmark-Norway
- Parent: Frederich Christopher Trampe, Count of Trampe (father)
- Education: Cand.jur.
- Profession: Politician

Adam Johan Frederik Poulsen Trampe (1798–1876) was a Dano-Norwegian lawyer and politician. He served as the County Governor of Nordlands amt from 1829 until 1833 and then as the County Governor of Nordre Trondhjems amt from 1833 until 1857.

== Personal life ==
Adam Johan Frederik Poulsen was born on 10 September 1798 in Copenhagen, Denmark. He was the son of Frederich Christopher Trampe, Count of Trampe from the noble Trampe family. The Count became a naturalized citizen of Norway in 1814, and during his lifetime had the public recognition of his title. This, however, did not apply to any of his children, since they were all born after the 1821 Nobility Law. He was one of the last legally recognized counts of Norway. He was the grandfather of Adam Fredrik Trampe Bødtker.

== Education and career ==
He graduated from the Trondheim Cathedral School in 1818 and then earned his Cand.jur. degree in 1821. In 1826 he became a police chief in Trondheim. In 1829, he was appointed to be the County Governor of Nordlands amt, a position that he held until 1833 when he was appointed as the County Governor of Nordre Trondhjems amt. He retired from the governorship in 1857.

During his lifetime, he held honorary positions in the Swedish-Norwegian Court. He was a Chamberlain and later he was the senior Valet de chambre for the 1860 coronation of King Karl IV.

Government offices
Preceded by Johan Ernst Berg	County Governor of Nordlands amt 1829–1833	Succeeded by Lars Bastian Ridder Stabell
Preceded by Christen Elster	County Governor of Nordre Trondhjems amt 1833–1857	Succeeded by Fredrik August Wessel-Berg
