= Thorvald Løchen =

Norwegian civil servant and politician

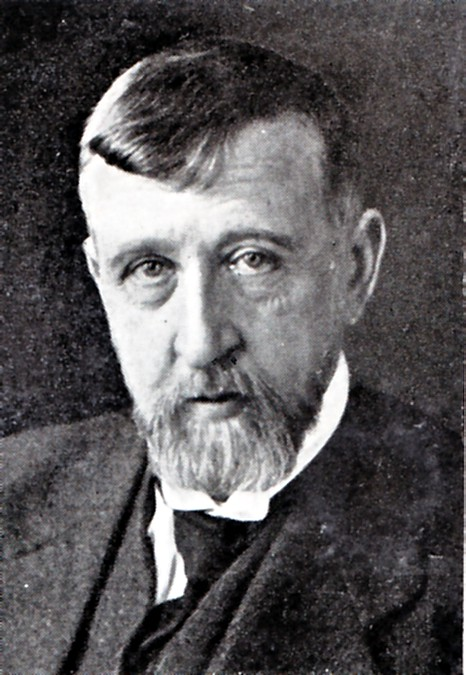

9th Governor of Nordre Trondhjem
- In office 1902–1916
- Preceded by: Halvor Bachke Guldahl
- Succeeded by: Halvor Bachke Guldahl

11th Governor of Hedmark
- In office 1916–1926
- Preceded by: Johannes Irgens
- Succeeded by: Knud Iversen Øyen

Personal details
- Born: 29 January 1861 Vang, Norway
- Died: 23 December 1943 (aged 82) Oslo, Norway
- Citizenship: Norway
- Profession: Politician

Thorvald Løchen (1861–1943) was a Norwegian civil servant and politician. He served as the County Governor of Nordre Trondhjems county from 1902 until 1916 and also as the County Governor of Hedmark county from 1916 until 1926.

He received a cand.jur. degree in 1883, and then began to work in the Ministry of the Interior from 1891 to 1900. He was the chief executive of the Ministry of Agriculture from 1900 to 1902. After that he became the County Governor in Nordre Trondhjem county from 1902 to 1916; and then immediately after that, he was appointed as the County Governor of Hedmark county, a position he held from 1916 to 1926.

During his time in Nordre Trondhjem county, the first part of the Nordlandsbanen railway line, then called the Hell-Sunnan line, was completed. Løchen also participated in the investigation and planning of the next section of the line heading northwards, a question which was decided at an extraordinary county council meeting in 1915, although that portion of the track was not completed until 1926–1929.

Thorvald Løchen was the son of the lawyer Edvard Martin Løchen, and he was the brother of Justice Minister Einar Løchen. In 1909, he married Ingeborg Mathia Motzfeldt, the daughter of government minister Ernst Motzfeldt.

Government offices
Preceded by Halvor Bachke Guldahl	County Governor of Nordre Trondhjems amt 1902–1916	Succeeded by Halvor Bachke Guldahl
Preceded by Johannes Irgens (acting)	County Governor of Hedmark; 1916–1926	Succeeded by Knud Iversen Øyen
