= Inge Ryan =

Norwegian politician

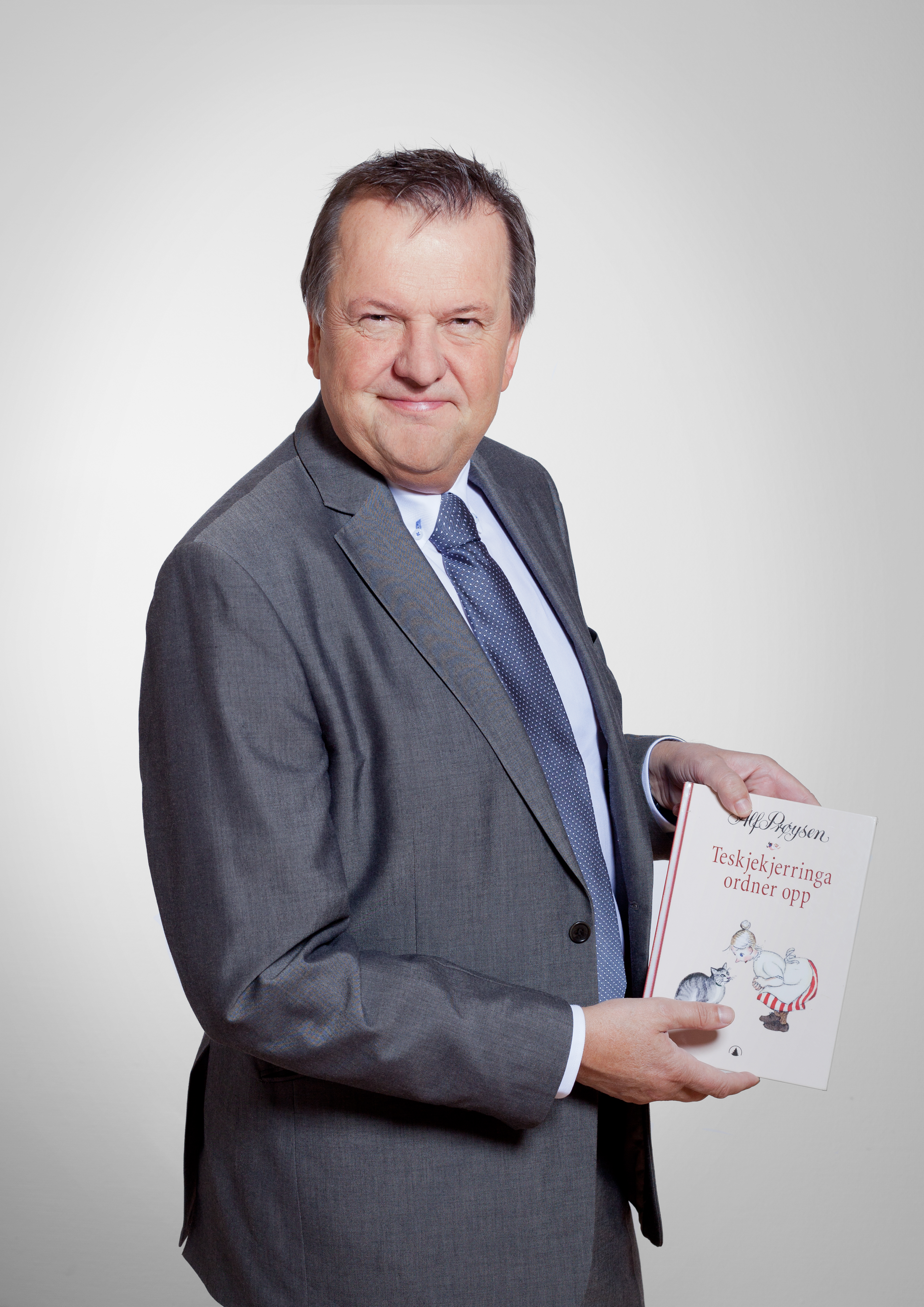
- Inge Ryan as reading ambassador for Nord-Trøndelag county library Credit: Inga Frøseth Rossing / Nord-Trøndelag fylkesbibliotek, 2013

County Governor of Nord-Trøndelag
- In office 2 November 2009 – 30 September 2017
- Prime Minister: Jens Stoltenberg; Erna Solberg
- Preceded by: Oddbjørn Nordset
- Succeeded by: Gerd Janne Kristoffersen

Member of the Norway Parliament for Nord-Trøndelag
- In office 2001–2009

Mayor of Namsskogan Municipality
- In office 1991–1995

Personal details
- Born: 15 August 1956 (age 69) Overhalla Municipality, Nord-Trøndelag, Norway
- Party: Socialist Left
- Spouse: Bjørg Tørresdal (2005-)

Inge Ryan (born 15 August 1956 in Overhalla Municipality) is a Norwegian politician for the Socialist Left Party. From 2009 to 2017, he was County Governor of Nord-Trøndelag. Ryan was mayor of Namsskogan Municipality from 1991 to 1995, and was a member of the Parliament of Norway from 2001 to 2009, the last four years as his party's parliamentary leader.

== Early and personal life ==
Ryan was born 15 August 1956 in Overhalla Municipality. His parents were forester Arvid Ryan and nurse Irene Opdal. He attended Øysletta School from 1963 to 1969. At the age of eight, he started the association Tiger to establish a ski jump. He attended Overhalla Lower Secondary School from 1969 to 1972, and was during the period active in orienteering and association football as a goalie. He attended Namdal Upper Secondary School from 1972 to 1975, where he took general academics. During secondary school, his best subject was history.

On 5 November 2005, Ryan married Bjørg Tørresdal. She was a fellow member of parliament, representing the Christian Democratic Party. Priest and Minister of the Environment Helen Bjørnøy wedded the couple.

In June 2009, Ryan was admitted to Ullevål University Hospital for treatment. His close friend and Minister of Health and Care Services, Bjarne Håkon Hanssen from the Labour Party, phoned director Tove Strand at Ullevål to inquire why Ryan was not admitted to Rikshospitalet and whether he was receiving the necessary treatment. This spurred a public debate about the incident.

== Professional career ==
While attending secondary school, Ryan had several small jobs, including for Øyvind Johansen. When 18, Ryan worked at a fish factory in Sørvær. Ryan worked as a teacher at Skorovatn School from 1975 to 1977, after which he studied teaching at Levanger College and Alta College, graduating in 1980. He has also studied history at Bodø College and pedagogy at the University of Trondheim. He then started working as a teacher at Trones School in Namsskogan Municipality until 1987, when he was appointed principal. Among his pedagogical methods were starting a local radio station, run by the students, and establishing the zoo Namsskogan Familiepark, with the pupils as minority shareholders, and established a bakery run by the students. He returned as teacher in 1991, but chose to apply for the job as principal in Alvdal Municipality. He was awarded the job, but was elected mayor before starting the job. Ryan was also a board member of Namsskogan Familiepark from 1987 to 1991. He worked as mayor from 1991 to 1995, and from then until 1997 was regional director of the Norwegian Public Employment Service. In 1996, he applied for the job as chief-of-administration in Tromsø, but failed to get the job. He quit this job in protest against the state's unemployment policies, because he had been instructed to "depopulate Indre Namdal", because the agency policies required people to be moved if they could not get jobs locally. From 1997 to 2001, he was the director of Indre Namdal Regional Council. From 2001 to 2009, Ryan worked as a full-time member of parliament. On 19 December 2008, Ryan was appointed County Governor of Nord-Trøndelag. He started on 1 November 2009, succeeding Oddbjørn Nordset, who had been acting for Inger Lise Gjørv since 2008. Initially, he held the position for six years.

== Political career ==
Ryan's first political activity started at the age of 15, when his grandfather Helge Opdal took him to a political meeting, where Ryan listed to the Labour politician Guttorm Hansen. In 1971, Ryan attended Red Youth's summer camp, the youth wing of the Red Electoral Alliance. He was given a code name and started a chapter in Overhalla. At upper secondary school, Ryan became an active promoter of the socialist newspaper Klassekampen. Ryan's interest for politics died down afterwards.

=== Municipal and county ===
Prior to the 1983 municipal election, Odd Einar Dørum, the leader of the Liberal Party asked him to run as a candidate for the municipal council, and Ryan accepted since he did not disagree with anything on the program. He was however not elected. In 1989, the Socialist Left Party started a chapter in Namsskogan, and Ryan was nominated as top candidate. Following the 1991 election, the party won 26.2% of the popular vote. The party cooperated with the Centre Party, which involved the Socialist Left Party gaining the mayor for the four-year term in exchange for supporting the Centre Party's candidate in the next term. Ryan, who had never met in a single municipal council meeting, was thereby elected mayor. Nationally, the party captured only seven mayors in the election. In the same election, Ryan was also elected member of Nord-Trøndelag County Council. The following year, Ryan was appointed as board member of the county-owned power company Nord-Trøndelag Elektrisitetsverk, where he sat until 1999. He was also leader of the Namsskogan chapter of the Socialist Left Party.

In the 1995 election, Ryan was re-elected to the municipal council and county council, and subsequently appointed deputy mayor of Namsskogan and the county's executive board. In 1996, he was appointed to the board of a government committee to grant subsidies to local stores in remote locations. The same year he became a deputy board member of Nord-Trøndelag University College, and from 1999 until 2001 he was a regular member. From 1998 to 2002, he also sat on the board of Trøndelag R&D Institute. Following the 1999 election, Ryan was re-elected to the municipal and county councils, and was appointed to the county's executive board. From 1999 to 2001, Ryan sat on the board for Norwegian Association of Local and Regional Authorities (KS). Ryan also sat in the KS-appointed Stand Committee, led by Morten Strand, that suggested to reduce the number of directorate and reduce the influence of the county governors.

=== Parliament and national politics ===
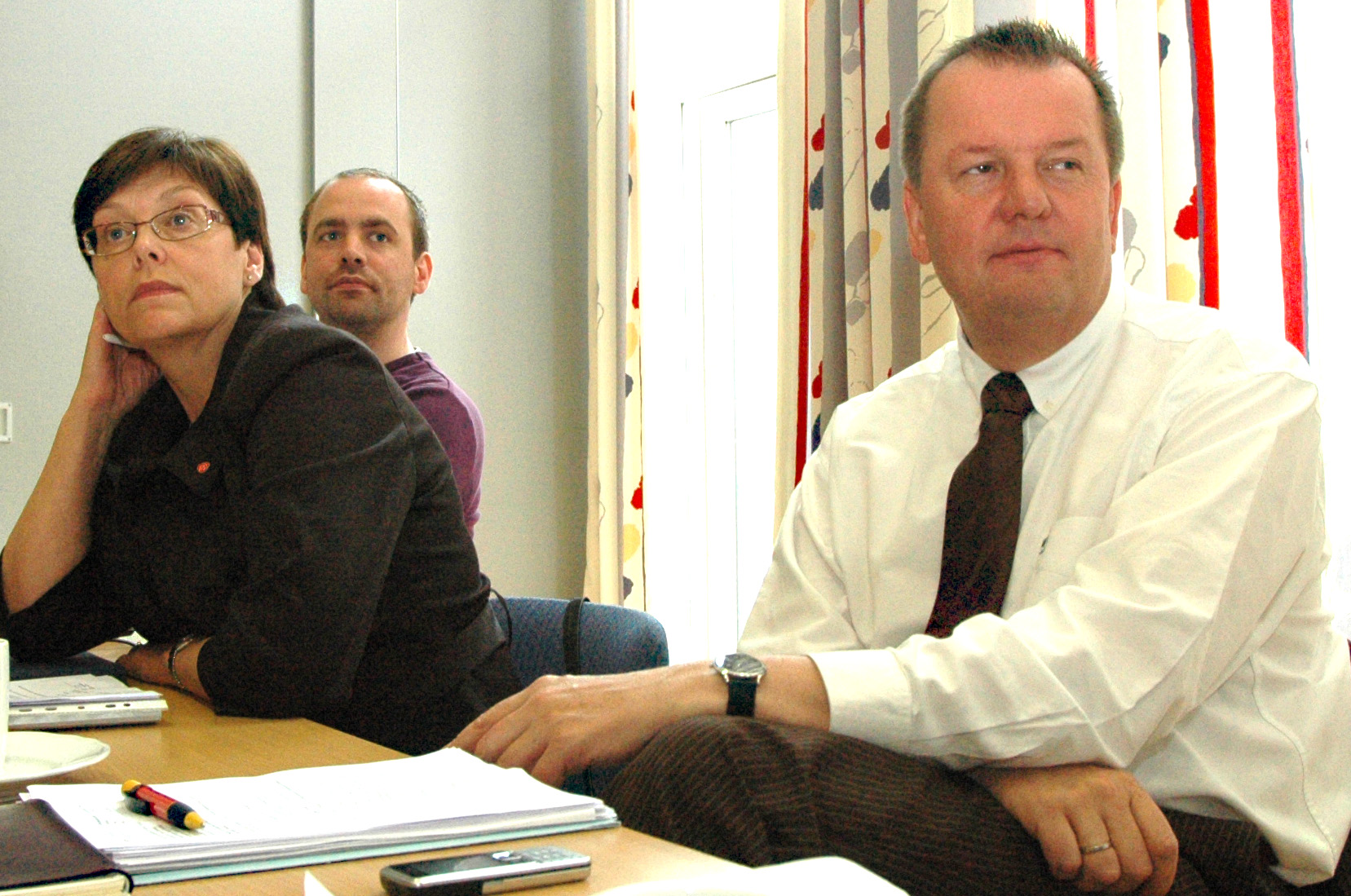
Ryan (right) and two other members of parliament for Nord-Trøndelag: Gerd Janne Kristoffersen (left) and Arild Stokkan-Grande

Prior to the 1993 parliamentary election, Ryan was one of three nominee candidates for the Socialist Left Party's list in Nord-Trøndelag. Ryan was nominated on third place on the list, after Jorunn Hageler and Inge Staldvik. Hageler was elected to parliament, and Ryan was her second deputy during the term 1993 to 1997. Prior to the 1997 election, Ryan was launched as an alternative top candidate for Nord-Trøndelag. At the nomination meeting, Hageler won 23 against Ryan's 13 votes, and Ryan was placed on second place on the list. After the nomination, Hageler stated that she regretted having said that Ryan was less suitable to sit in parliament than she was, because of his down-to-earth appeal and informal dress code. The party failed to win a seat from the county in 1997. Ryan was a possible candidate to become deputy party leader of his party in 1997, but was instead appointed as central board member. He became deputy leader in 1999, a position he held until 2001.

In the 2001 election, Ryan was the party's top candidate in the county, and succeeded in winning a seat. The party had its best election ever, including in Nord-Trøndelag, where it won 13.8% of the votes, up 7.5% compared to 1997. Ryan became a member of the party's largest parliamentary group ever. During the parliamentary term from 2001 to 2005, Ryan was a member of the Standing Committee on Business and Industry and the Election Committee. He was a member of the parliamentary delegation to the Nordic Council. He also was a deputy member of the European Committee and the delegation to the United Nations General Assembly.

In the 2005 election, Ryan was successful at retaining his seat. Following the Socialist Left Party's entering government as part of Stoltenberg's Second Cabinet, Ryan was appointed the party's parliamentary leader. He was appointed first vice chair of the Standing Committee on Scrutiny and Constitutional Affairs, a position he held until 24 November 2007, when he again sat on the Standing Committee on Business and Industry. For the full term 2005 to 2009, he was a member of the Election Committee and the Enlarged Committee on Foreign Affairs. He was a delegate to the Nordic Council, and from 2007 a delegate to the United Nations General Assembly.

== Political policy ==
Since the 1970s, Namsskogan had experienced a rapid decline in the population, from 1,750 to 1,000 in the early 1990s. Among Ryan's political changes as mayor was to encourage people to take their holidays in the winter instead of the summer. He argued that the three main industries in Namsskogan—agriculture, forestry and tourism—all had their peaks during May through October, but that it was difficult to get sufficient work-force during this period because people were on holiday. The municipality offered 4,000 kr to anyone who took their three-week summer vacation during the winter. Ryan also introduced a public service office, where residents could be served with all necessary public over-the-counter services at one place. For people living outside the community center, a cooperation was made with local stores where people could send in standardized application there. Some simple applications, such as erecting a simple garage, were approved on the spot at the service office. The Socialist Left Party used Namsskogan during the 1995 election as their prime example for how they wanted to modernize the public sector.

Ryan's election as party deputy leader in 1999 was largely due to the party's parliamentary support for the 1999 NATO bombing of Yugoslavia. Ryan represented the branch of the party that was opposed to the Norwegian participation in the war, and was appointed to supplement the Kristin Halvorsen and Øystein Djupedal, who were both in favor of the bombings. In 2001, Ryan proposed allowing local stores to function as branches of Vinmonopolet, the state-run liquor stores, to allow liquor and wine retailing in rural areas.

During the 2001 election, Ryan's main issues were related to regional policy. He wanted to introduce subsidies for local stores in rural areas, and equal price throughout the country for power line component in the electrical prices. Other issues were increased funding for schools, increasing the progressivity of taxation and making a two-tier system for taxes on electricity. After being elected, Ryan worked to establish public service offices, and wanted to force state agencies to participate in these. He also called for a separate Minister of Rural Affairs.

== Election results ==
=== Municipal elections ===
Party	1983		1991		1995		1999		
Party	Votes	%	Votes	%	%	Seats	Votes	%	Seats
Labour	395	53.8	236	35.7	31.8	5	205	37.2	7
Socialist Left	—	—	173	26.2	27.5	5	114	20.7	3
Centre	71	9.7	111	16.8	20.9	4	—	—	—
Liberal	36	4.9	—	—	—	—	—	—	—
Christian Democratic	—	—	31	4.7	—	—	—	—	—
Local list	232	31.6	110	16.6	19.8	3	232	42.1	7
Outcome	Not elected		Mayor		Deputy mayor			Elected	

=== County elections ===
Party	1991	1995		1999		
Party	Seats	%	Seats	Votes	%	Seats
Labour	16	35.9	17	20,412	37.5	18
Centre	14	32.6	15	11,469	21.1	10
Socialist Left	6	7.0	3	5,651	10.4	5
Conservative	4	8.5	4	5,179	9.5	4
Christian Democratic	2	4.8	2	3,749	6.9	3
Progress	1	4.6	2	4,007	7.4	3
Liberal	2	5.2	2	2,897	5.3	2
Other	0	1.4	0	1,031	1.9	0
Outcome	Elected	Elected		Elected		

=== Parliamentary elections ===
In the 1993 and 1997, Ryan was third and second candidate on the lists. For the 2001 and 2005 elections, he was the top candidate.

Party	1993		1997			2001			2005		
Party	%	Seats	Votes	%	Seats	Votes	%	Seats	Votes	%	Seats
Labour	38.4	3	29,370	40.1	3	22,703	32.4	2	29,359	40.0	2
Centre	31.1	2	14,003	19.1	1	10,878	15.5	1	11,966	16.3	1
Socialist Left	9.8	1	4,601	6.3	0	9,671	13.8	1	8,399	11.5	1
Progress	2.5	0	6,651	9.1	1	7,445	10.6	1	10,916	14.9	1
Christian Democratic	4.6	0	8,845	12.1	1	7,260	10.4	1	3,439	4.7	0
Conservative	8.1	0	4,981	6.8	0	7,191	10.3	0	5,094	6.9	0
Liberal	4.1	0	3,446	4.7	0	2,408	3.4	0	3,165	4.3	1†
Other	1.0	0	1,394	1.8	0	2,550	3.6	0	1,000	1.4	0
Outcome	Second deputy		Not elected			Elected			Elected		

Civic offices
Preceded by Oddbjørn Nordset	County Governor of Nord-Trøndelag; 2009-2017	Succeeded by Gerd Janne Kristoffersen
