= List of county governors of Nordland =

The county governor of Nordland county in Norway represents the central government administration in the county. The office of county governor is a government agency of the Kingdom of Norway. The title was Amtmann (before 1919), then Fylkesmann (from 1919 to 2020), and then Statsforvalteren (since 2021).

In 1688, the government of Norway established Nordland as an amt (or county). Originally it included most of Northern Norway except for Finnmark. The southern border of Nordland was the Bindalsfjorden, a little further north than today's county border. In 1787, the northern part of Nordland was separated from Nordland and transferred to Finnmark county to the north. In 1852, the southern border of the county was adjusted to include Sør-Bindalen in the county. In 1919, the name of the county was changed to Nordland fylke.

From 1844 until 1918, the county was subordinate to the Diocesan Governor of Tromsø who was the civil governor of the Diocese of Tromsø.

The county governor is the government's representative in the county. The governor carries out the resolutions and guidelines of the Storting and government. This is done first by the county governor performing administrative tasks on behalf of the ministries. Secondly, the county governor also monitors the activities of the municipalities and is the appeal body for many types of municipal decisions.

== Names ==
The word for county (amt or fylke) has changed over time. From 1688 until 1918 the title was Amtmann i Nordlandenes amt. On 1 January 1919, the title was Fylkesmann i Nordland. On 1 January 2021, the title was again changed to the gender-neutral Statsforvalteren i Nordland.

== List of county governors ==
Nordland county has had the following governors:

County governors of Nordland
Start	End	Name
1669	1686	Knud Ovessøn Gjedde (c. 1635–1707); Served concurrently as the County Governor of Finnmark amt (1680-1682).
1686	1691	Christian Jørgensen Kruse (1636–1699)
1691	1694	Peter Christoffersen Tønder (1641–1694)
1694	1703	Christoffer Heidemann (c. 1623–1703)
1703	1704	Frederik Splet (16??–1704)
1704	1751	Ove Sørensen Schjelderup (1674–1759)
1751	1767	Hans Hagerup de Gyldenpalm (1717–1781)
1767	1771	Peter Holm (1733–1817)
1771	1789	Joachim de Knagenhielm (1727–1796)
1789	1811	Christian Torberg Hegge (1743–1818)
1811	1815	Christen Elster (1763–1833)
1815	1828	Johan Ernst Berg (1768–1828)
1829	1833	Adam Johan Frederik Poulsen, The Greve of Trampe (1798–1876)
1834	1847	Lars Bastian Ridder Stabell (1798–1860)
1848	1853	Nils Weyer Arveschoug (1807–1894)
1854	1858	Paul Peter Vilhelm Breder (1816–1890)
1858	1867	Carsten Smith (1817–1884)
1867	1878	Claus Nieuwejaar Worsøe (1822–1906)
1878	1889	Otto Benjamin Andreas Aubert (1841–1898)
1890	1908	Rasmus Theisen (1837–1908)
1908	1913	Anton Thorkildsen Omholt (1861–1925)
1913	1921	Jonas Pedersen (1871–1953)
1922	1939	Olaf Amundsen (1876–1939)
1940	1951	Karl Hess Larsen (1900–1966)
Aug 1941	1942	Per von Hirsch (1902–1987) (WWII Occupied government)
15 Sept 1942	1945	Karl Ludvig Nøstvik (1895–1992) (WWII Occupied government)
1951	1966	Bue Fjermeros (1912–2000)
1966	1983	Ole Aavatsmark (1918–1983)
1983	1991	Odd With (1921–2006)
1991	2007	Åshild Hauan (1941–2017)
7 June 1991	1 Sept 1993	Davis Idin Pareli Johansen (born 1926); Acting governor for Hauan.
2007	25 Oct 2018	Hill-Marta Solberg (born 1951)
1 Jan 2008	31 Oct 2009	Ola Bjerkaas (born 1952); Acting governor for Solberg.
26 Oct 2018	present	Tom Cato Karlsen (born 1974)
