= Fredrik August Wessel-Berg =

Norwegian jurist (1809–1895)

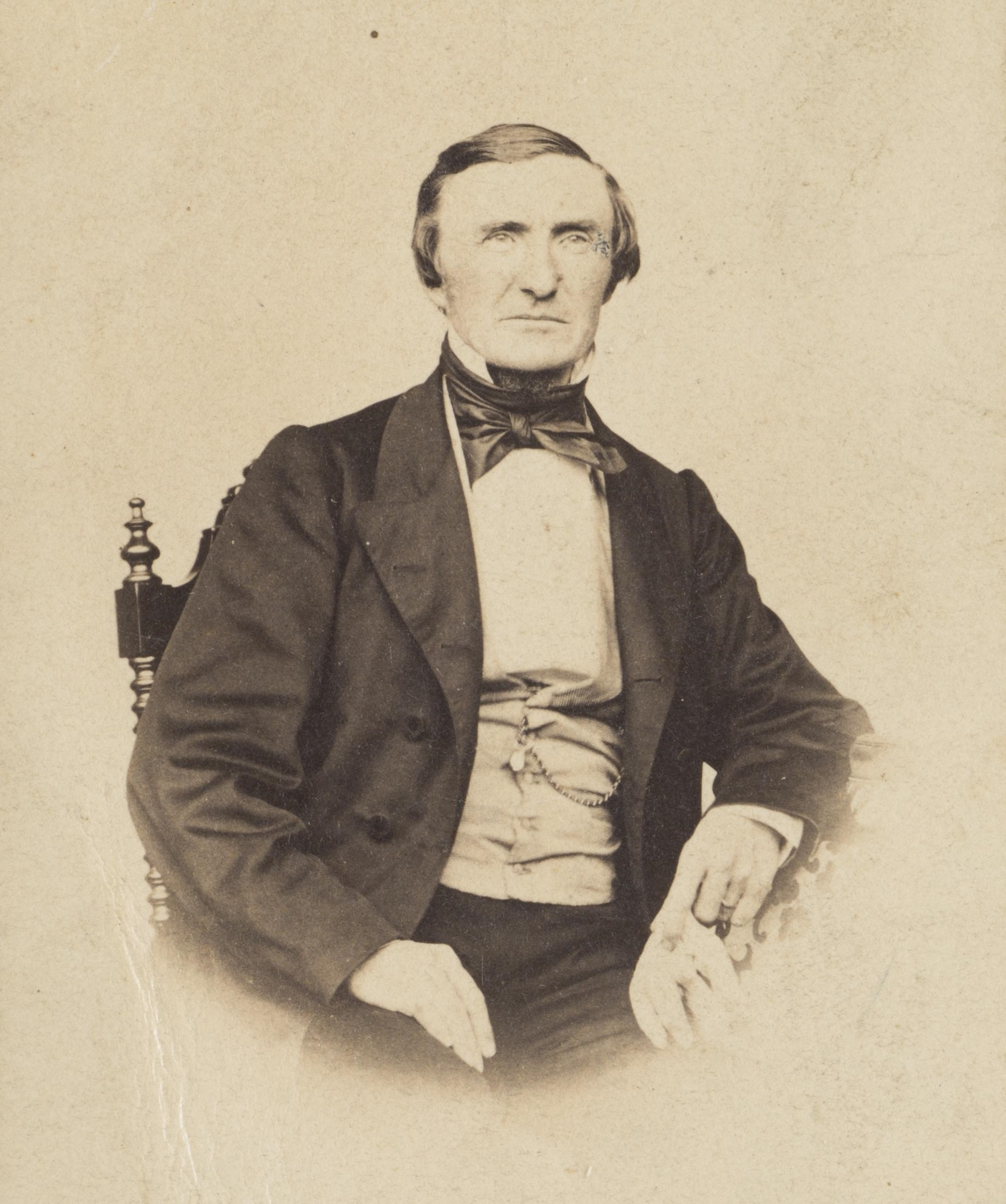

Governor of Nordre Trondhjem
- In office 1857–1866
- Preceded by: Adam J.F. Poulsen Trampe
- Succeeded by: Carsten Smith

Personal details
- Born: 27 June 1809 Sem, Norway
- Died: 8 November 1895 (aged 86) Kongsvinger, Norway
- Citizenship: Norway
- Education: Cand.jur.
- Profession: Politician

Fredrik August Wessel-Berg (1809–1895) was a Norwegian civil servant and government official. He served as the County Governor of Nordre Trondhjems county from 1857 until 1866.

He graduated with a cand.jur. degree in 1835. He then worked for the Ministry of Finance from 1835 to 1849. He then served as a bailiff in the Ørke- og Guledals fogderi in Søndre Trondhjem county from 1850 to 1857. He was then appointed as the County Governor of Nordre Trondhjems county from 1857 until 1866. After leaving that post, he became a judge in the Vinger and Odal District Court from 1866 until his retirement in 1880.

His father, Jens Christian Berg, was the magistrate of Søndre Jarlsberg in 1803–1814, and his mother, Hedevig Marie Elisabeth Wessel, was the daughter of a nephew of Peter Tordenskjold, Major Joachim Wessel. Wessel-Berg was married twice. First with Pauline Augusta Claussen, who died in 1872, and from 1879 with Elisabeth Margaretha Nilsen.

He became Knight of the Order of St. Olav in 1866, at the end of his time as a county governor.

Government offices
Preceded by Adam Johan Frederik Poulsen Trampe	County Governor of Nordre Trondhjems amt 1857–1866	Succeeded by Carsten Smith
