= Christen Elster =

Norwegian civil servant and politician

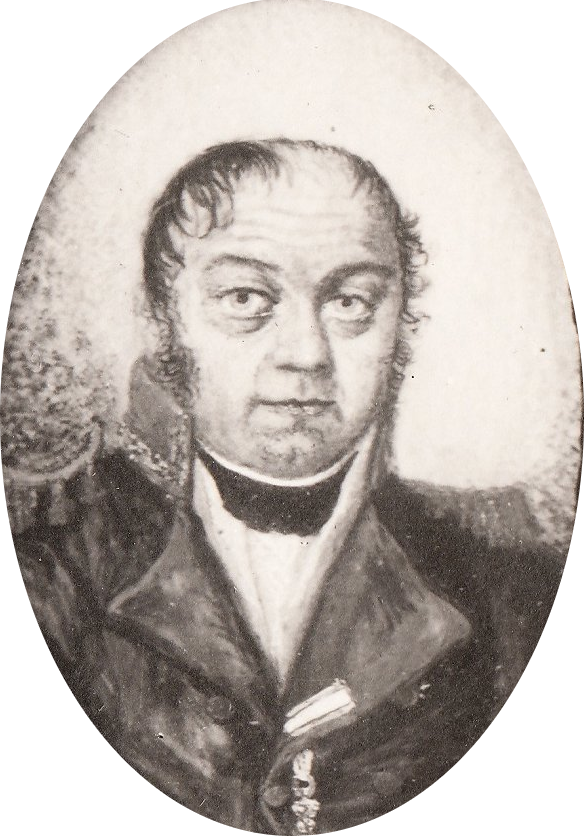

Governor of Nordre Trondhjems amt
- In office 1815–1833
- Preceded by: Caspar Conrad Rafn
- Succeeded by: Adam Johan Frederik Poulsen

Governor of Nordlands amt
- In office 1811–1815
- Preceded by: Christian Torberg Hegge
- Succeeded by: Johan Ernst Berg

Personal details
- Born: 2 April 1763 Strømsø, Norway
- Died: 11 March 1833 (aged 69) Verdal, Norway
- Citizenship: Norway
- Profession: Politician

Christen Elster (1763–1833) was a Norwegian civil servant and politician. He served as the County Governor of Nordland county from 1811 until 1815. He was then appointed as the County Governor of Nordre Trondhjem county from 1815 until his death in 1833. His descendants include Kristian Elster (born 1841) and Kristian Elster (born 1881).

Government offices
Preceded by Christian Torberg Hegge	County Governor of Nordlands amt 1811–1815	Succeeded by Johan Ernst Berg
Preceded by Caspar Conrad Rafn	County Governor of Nordre Trondhjems amt 1815–1833	Succeeded by Adam Johan Frederik Poulsen, Greve of Trampe
