= List of county governors of Nord-Trøndelag =

The county governor of Nord-Trøndelag county in Norway represented the central government administration in the county. The office of county governor is a government agency of the Kingdom of Norway; the title was Amtmann (before 1919) and then Fylkesmann (after 1919). The county of Nordre Trondhjems amt (re-named Nord-Trøndelag in 1919) was established by royal resolution on 24 September 1804 when the old Trondhjems amt was divided in two. The county existed until 1 January 2018 when the two counties were merged once again.

The county governor is the government's representative in the county. The governor carries out the resolutions and guidelines of the Storting and government. This is done first by the county governor performing administrative tasks on behalf of the ministries. Secondly, the county governor also monitors the activities of the municipalities and is the appeal body for many types of municipal decisions.

== History ==
The first county governor in Nordre Trondhjem, Caspar Conrad Rafn, lived in Verdal, as this was decreed to the county capital. Rafn's successor Christen Elster settled in Inderøy and made that his seat. In 1818, the state bought Sund farm in Inderøy and this began an almost eighty-year period with Inderøy as the county capital. Elster did not live at Sund, but his four successors lived and held an office there. When Ole Anton Qvam became governor in 1894, he lived at the Gjævran farm in Egge (now part of Steinkjer Municipality) and he moved the county seat to that location. The Sund farm in Inderøy was sold in 1900.

The county manor house in Steinkjer, "Eggeli", was designed by the Trondheim architect Axel Guldahl and was built in 1919 under the leadership of Gov. Halvor Bachke Guldahl. Guldahl had previously lived at Ølvisheim, and had offices there. The work of moving the office space from a rural office and into urban areas can be seen as part of a major urbanization process in society. Eggeli was the seat of the county until 1945. The building was then just the residence for county governors until 1986, when the county moved away from providing a governor's residence.

From 1948 until 1962, the county governor's office was at Føinumgården in Elvegata 1 in the town of Steinkjer. From 1962, the office moved into the county municipality's newly built office building at Ogndalsvegen 2, also in the town center. The state house in Steinkjer was completed in 1988, at the southern end of the city center, and it houses both the county governor and the chambers for the Nord-Trøndelag County Municipality councilors as well as for several other regional state agencies.

Nord-Trøndelag merged with Sør-Trøndelag county on 1 January 2018. The new county governor for Trøndelag will continue to live and work in the town of Steinkjer.

== List of county governors ==
The following is a list of the county governors of Nord-Trøndelag:

County governors of Nord-Trøndelag
Start	End	Name
1805	1815	Caspar Conrad Rafn (1763–1830)
1815	1833	Christen Elster (1763–1833)
1833	1857	Adam Johan Frederik Poulsen, The Greve of Trampe (1798–1876)
1857	1866	Fredrik August Wessel-Berg (1809–1895)
1867	1884	Carsten Smith (1817–1884)
1884	1894	Lars Otto Roll Grundt (1843–1907)
1894	1898	Ole Anton Qvam (1835–1904)
1898	1902	Halvor Bachke Guldahl (1859–1931)
1902	1916	Thorvald Løchen (1861–1943)
1916	1927	Halvor Bachke Guldahl (1859–1931); 2nd term
1927	1944	Håkon Five (1880–1944)
1941	1945	Torbjørn Eggen (1906–1984) (WWII Occupied government)
1945	1945	Bent Berger (1898–1985) (Acting governor)
1945	1959	Asbjørn Lindboe (1889–1967)
1959	1964	Gustav Sjaastad (1902–1964)
1964	1972	Ole Bae (1902–1972)
1972	1979	Leif Granli (1909–1988)
1979	1991	Ola Hansen Kveli (1921–2003)
1991	2008	Inger Lise Gjørv (1938–2009)
1991	1993	Oddbjørn Nordset (born 1946) (Acting governor for Gjørv)
2008	2009	Oddbjørn Nordset (born 1946) (Acting governor)
2009	2017	Inge Ryan (born 1956)
2017	2017	Gerd Janne Kristoffersen (born 1952) (Acting governor)
Office abolished on 1 January 2018.

- For the county governors of this area before 1804, see List of county governors of Trøndelag.
- For the county governors of this area after 2017, see List of county governors of Trøndelag.
