= Guldahl =

Guldahl is a surname. Notable people with the surname include:

- Halvor Bache Guldahl (1859–1931), Norwegian jurist, businessman, and politician
- Ralph Guldahl (1911–1987), American golfer
