= Rafn =

Rafn is a Danish and Norwegian surname. Notable people with the surname include:

- Aage Rafn (1890–1953), Danish architect
- Carl Christian Rafn (1795–1864), Danish historian, translator, and antiquarian
- Carl Gottlob Rafn (1769–1808), Danish scientist and civil servant
- Caspar Conrad Rafn (1763–1830), Dano-Norwegian politician
- Hardy Rafn (1930–1997), Danish actor
- Lina Rafn (born 1976), Danish singer, songwriter, and producer
- Robert Rafn (1878–1964), Norwegian businessman and politician
- Simen Rafn (born 1992), Norwegian footballer
