= Otto Benjamin Andreas Aubert =

Norwegian civil servant and politician

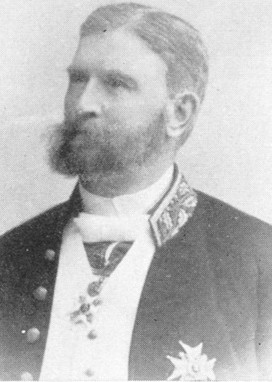

Governor of Bratsberg amt
- In office 1889–1898
- Preceded by: Ulrik Frederik Christian Arneberg
- Succeeded by: Thomas von Westen Engelhart

Governor of Nordland
- In office 1878–1889
- Preceded by: Claus Nieuwejaar Worsøe
- Succeeded by: Rasmus Theisen

Personal details
- Born: 17 December 1841 Bergen, Norway
- Died: 23 January 1898 (aged 56) Skien, Norway
- Citizenship: Norway
- Profession: Politician

Otto Benjamin Andreas Aubert (1841–1898) was a Norwegian civil servant and politician. He was the son of the Norwegian politician Michael Conrad Sophus Emil Aubert.

He served as the County Governor of Nordland county from 1878 until 1889. In 1889, he was appointed to serve as the County Governor of Bratsberg county until his death in 1898.

Aubert died in a horse accident when a running horse rushed towards him on a slippery sidewalk, causing him to fall backwards and damage his brain.

Government offices
Preceded by Claus Nieuwejaar Worsøe	County Governor of Nordlands amt 1878–1889	Succeeded by Rasmus Theisen
Preceded by Ulrik Frederik Christian Arneberg	County Governor of Bratsberg amt 1889–1898	Succeeded by Thomas von Westen Engelhart
