= Bjørg Tørresdal =

Norwegian politician

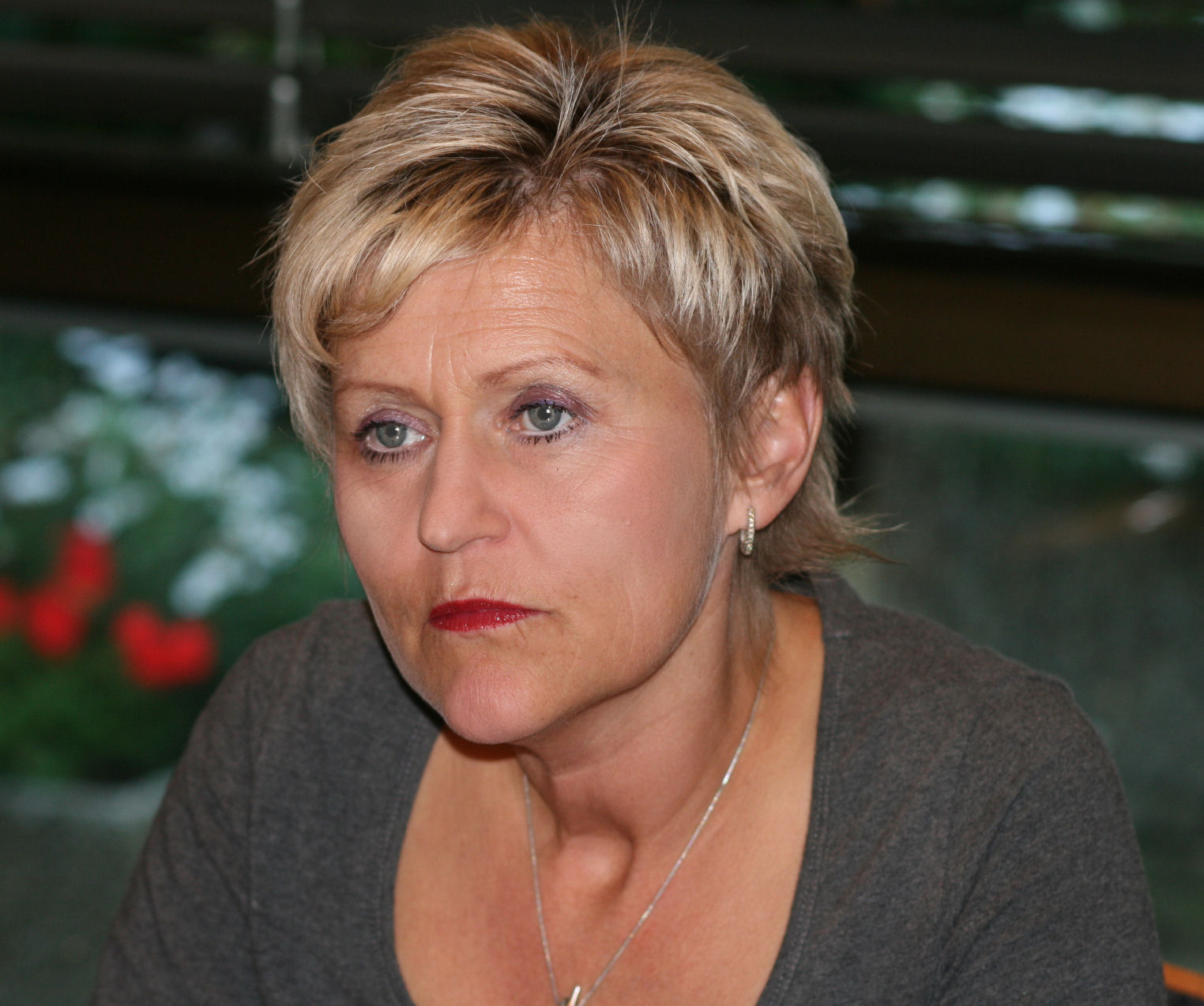
Bjørg Tørresdal in August 2007.

Bjørg Tørresdal (born 24 September 1958 in Madla Municipality) is a Norwegian politician for the Christian Democratic Party.

She was elected to the Norwegian Parliament from Rogaland in 2001, and has been re-elected on one occasion. She married Inge Ryan from the Socialist Left Party in 2005.

Ahead of the 2009 election, Tørresdal declined a renomination as the Christian Democrats' second candidate from Rogaland. However, she accepted the nomination as the first candidate from Nord-Trøndelag, where she had moved to be with her husband. The election gave the Christian Democrats only 4% of the vote in Nord-Trøndelag, and she was far away from winning a seat.
