= Rasmus Theisen =

Norwegian civil servant and politician

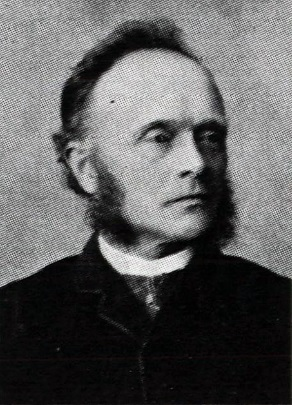

Governor of Nordland
- In office 1890–1908
- Preceded by: Otto Benjamin Andreas Aubert
- Succeeded by: Anton Omholt

Personal details
- Born: 16 September 1837 Spind Municipality, Norway
- Died: 15 May 1908 (aged 70) Norway
- Citizenship: Norway
- Profession: Politician

Rasmus Theisen (1837–1908) was a Norwegian civil servant and politician. From 1875 to 1877, he was the mayor of the town of Bodø in Norway. Later, he served as the County Governor of Nordland county from 1890 until his death in 1908.

Government offices
Preceded by Otto Benjamin Andreas Aubert	County Governor of Nordlands amt 1890–1908	Succeeded by Anton Omholt
