= Davis Idin Pareli Johansen =

Norwegian politician (1926–2020)

Acting Governor of Nordland
- In office 1991–1993
- Preceded by: Odd With
- Succeeded by: Åshild Hauan

Personal details
- Born: 7 January 1926 Norway
- Died: 28 November 2020 (aged 94)
- Citizenship: Norwegian
- Profession: Politician

Davis Idin Pareli Johansen (7 January 1926 – 28 November 2020) was a Norwegian politician. He served as the acting County Governor of Nordland county from 1991 until 1993 while Åshild Hauan was serving in the Parliament of Norway.

Johansen died on 28 November 2020, at the age of 94.

Government offices
Preceded by Odd With	Acting County Governor of Nordland; 1991–1993 (acting for Åshild Hauan)	Succeeded by Åshild Hauan
