= Anton Thorkildsen Omholt =

Norwegian civil servant and politician

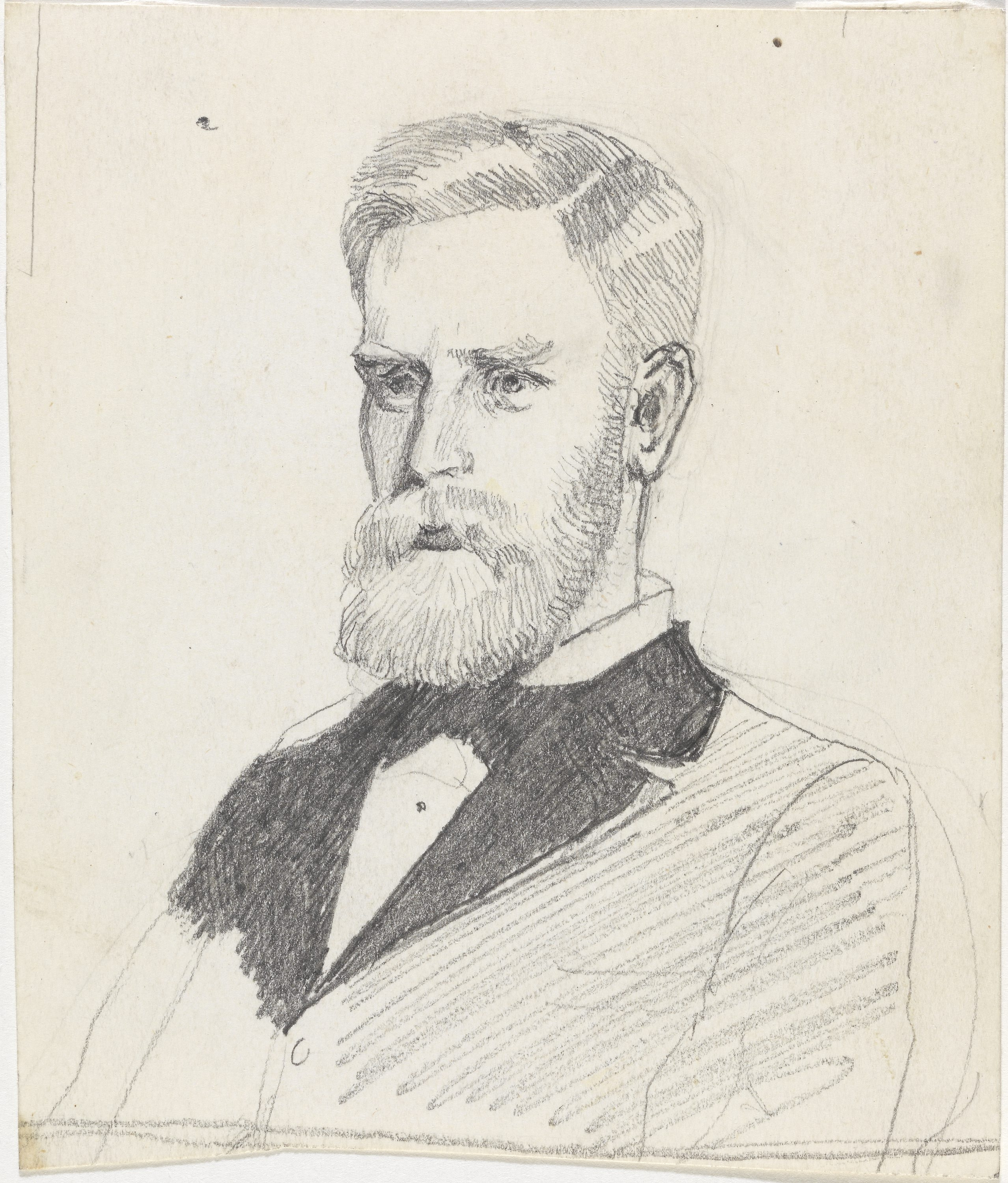

Minister of Finance
- In office 31 January 1913 – 16 June 1920
- Prime Minister: Gunnar Knudsen
- Preceded by: Fredrik L. Konow
- Succeeded by: Edvard H. Bull

Governor of Nordland
- In office 1908–1913
- Preceded by: Rasmus Theisen
- Succeeded by: Jonas Pedersen

Personal details
- Born: 7 November 1861 Kongsberg, Buskerud, United Kingdoms of Sweden and Norway
- Died: 11 February 1925 (aged 63) Oslo, Norway
- Party: Liberal
- Education: cand.jur. (1892)
- Profession: Politician

Anton Thorkildsen Omholt (7 November 1861 – 11 February 1925) was a Norwegian civil servant and politician for the Liberal Party. He served for a time as the editor of the Dagbladet newspaper. He served as the County Governor of Nordland county from 1908 until 1913. In 1913, the Prime Minister of Norway, Gunnar Knudsen asked him to be the Norwegian Minister of Finance, a position he held from 1913 to 1920. During his time as Minister of Finance, he took two leaves of absence. One was from 23 April-16 July 1915 and the other was at the end of his term, he left on leave on 12 December 1919 and resigned from the post on 16 June 1920. He then continued with a life outside of politics.

Government offices
Preceded by Rasmus Theisen	County Governor of Nordlands amt 1908–1913	Succeeded by Jonas Pedersen
