= Claus Nieuwejaar Worsøe =

Norwegian politician

Governor of Søndre Bergenhus amt
- In office 1878–1897
- Preceded by: Niels Mathias Rye
- Succeeded by: Hroar Olsen

Governor of Nordland
- In office 1867–1878
- Preceded by: Carsten Smith
- Succeeded by: Otto Benjamin Andreas Aubert

Personal details
- Born: 21 August 1822 Bergen, Norway
- Died: 30 July 1906 (aged 83) Kristiania, Norway
- Citizenship: Norway
- Spouse: Frederikke Olava Jacobine Trampe
- Profession: Politician

Claus Nieuwejaar Worsøe (1822-1906) was a Norwegian civil servant and politician. He served as the County Governor of Nordland county from 1867 until 1878. In 1878, he was appointed to serve as the County Governor of Søndre Bergenhus county until his retirement in 1897.

Government offices
Preceded by Carsten Smith	County Governor of Nordlands amt 1867–1878	Succeeded by Otto Benjamin Andreas Aubert
Preceded by Niels Mathias Rye	County Governor of Søndre Bergenhus amt 1878–1897	Succeeded by Hroar Olsen
