= Peter Christoffersen Tønder =

Norwegian government official

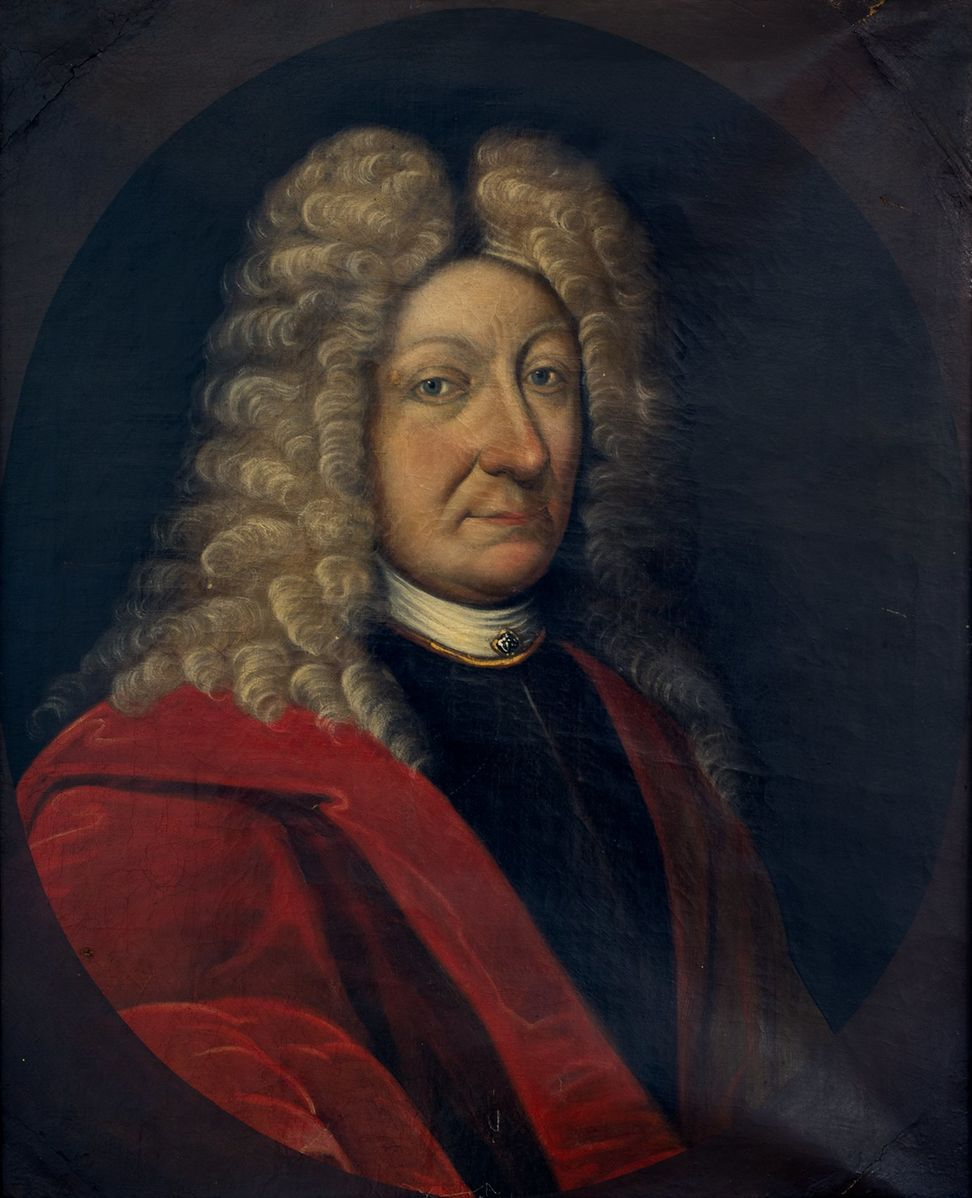

Governor of Nordlandenes amt
- In office 1691–1694
- Preceded by: Christian Jørgensen Kruse
- Succeeded by: Christoffer Heidemann

Personal details
- Born: 8 September 1641 Kristiansund, Norway
- Died: 1 July 1694 (aged 52) Dønna, Norway
- Citizenship: Denmark-Norway

Peter Christoffersen Tønder (1641-1694) was a Norwegian government official. He served as the County Governor of Nordland county from 1691 until his death in 1694.

Government offices
Preceded by Christian Jørgensen Kruse	County Governor of Nordlands amt 1691–1694	Succeeded by Christoffer Heidemann
