= Christian Torberg Hegge =

Norwegian civil servant and politician

Governor of Nordland
- In office 1789–1811
- Preceded by: Joachim de Knagenhielm
- Succeeded by: Christen Elster

Personal details
- Born: 24 August 1743 Hopsjø, Hitra, Norway
- Died: 30 March 1818 (aged 74) Trondheim, Norway
- Citizenship: Norway
- Profession: Politician

Christian Torberg Hegge (1743–1818) was a Norwegian civil servant and politician. He served as the County Governor of Nordland county from 1789 until his retirement in 1811.

Government offices
| Preceded by Joachim de Knagenhielm | County Governor of Nordlands amt 1789–1811 | Succeeded by Christen Elster |
