= Frederik Splet =

Dano-Norwegian government official

Frederik Splet Frederik Split

Governor of Nordlandenes amt
- In office 1703–1704
- Preceded by: Christoffer Heidemann
- Succeeded by: Ove Sørensen Schjelderup

Personal details
- Born: Unknown
- Died: 2 February 1704 Norway
- Citizenship: Denmark-Norway

Frederik Splet (died 1704) was a Dano-Norwegian government official. He served as the County Governor of Nordland county from 1703 until his death in 1704.

Government offices
Preceded by Christoffer Heidemann	County Governor of Nordlands amt 1703–1704	Succeeded by Ove Sørensen Schjelderup
