= Christian Jørgensen Kruse =

Norwegian government official

Governor of Nordlandenes amt
- In office 1686–1691
- Preceded by: Knud Ovessøn Gjedde
- Succeeded by: Peter Christoffersen Tønder

Personal details
- Born: 1636 Denmark-Norway
- Died: 1699 (aged 62–63) Copenhagen, Denmark-Norway
- Citizenship: Denmark-Norway

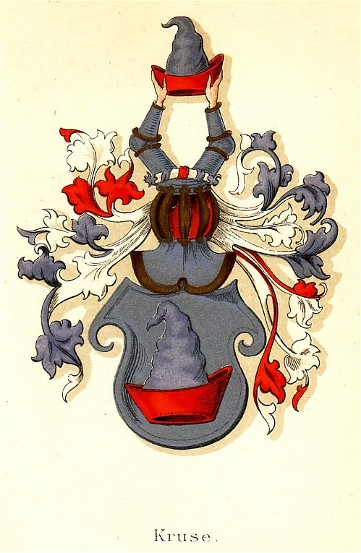
Kruse coat of arms

Christian Jørgensen Kruse (1636 - 29 October 1699) was a Danish government official who He served as the County Governor of Nordland county from 1686 until 1691.

He was born in 1736 as the son ofJørgen Enevoldsen Kruse, til Hjermeslevgaard and Beate Joachimsdatter von Bülow, af Wedendorf. His sister Else Jørgensdatter Kruse, Hjermeslevgaard was married to Valdemar Clausen Daa, til Borreby og Bonderup (1616-1691).

Kruuse was married to Anne Sophie Sivertsdatter Brockenhuus (1652-1693), a daughter of Datter af Siwert Brockenhuus, til Ullerup i Galtrup sogn and Helvig Ulriksdatter Sandberg, til Ullerup, Skarregaard. He died at Hummergade in Copenhagen on 29 October 1699. He was survived by two sons, Christian Christiansen Kruse (1685-1729) and Jørgen Christiansen Kruse (1686-1751). The latter served as commadant of Bornholm in 1644 and reached the rank of generalmajor.

Government offices
Preceded by Knud Ovessøn Gjedde	County Governor of Nordlands amt 1686–1691	Succeeded by Peter Christoffersen Tønder
