= Lars Bastian Ridder Stabell =

Norwegian politician (1798–1860)

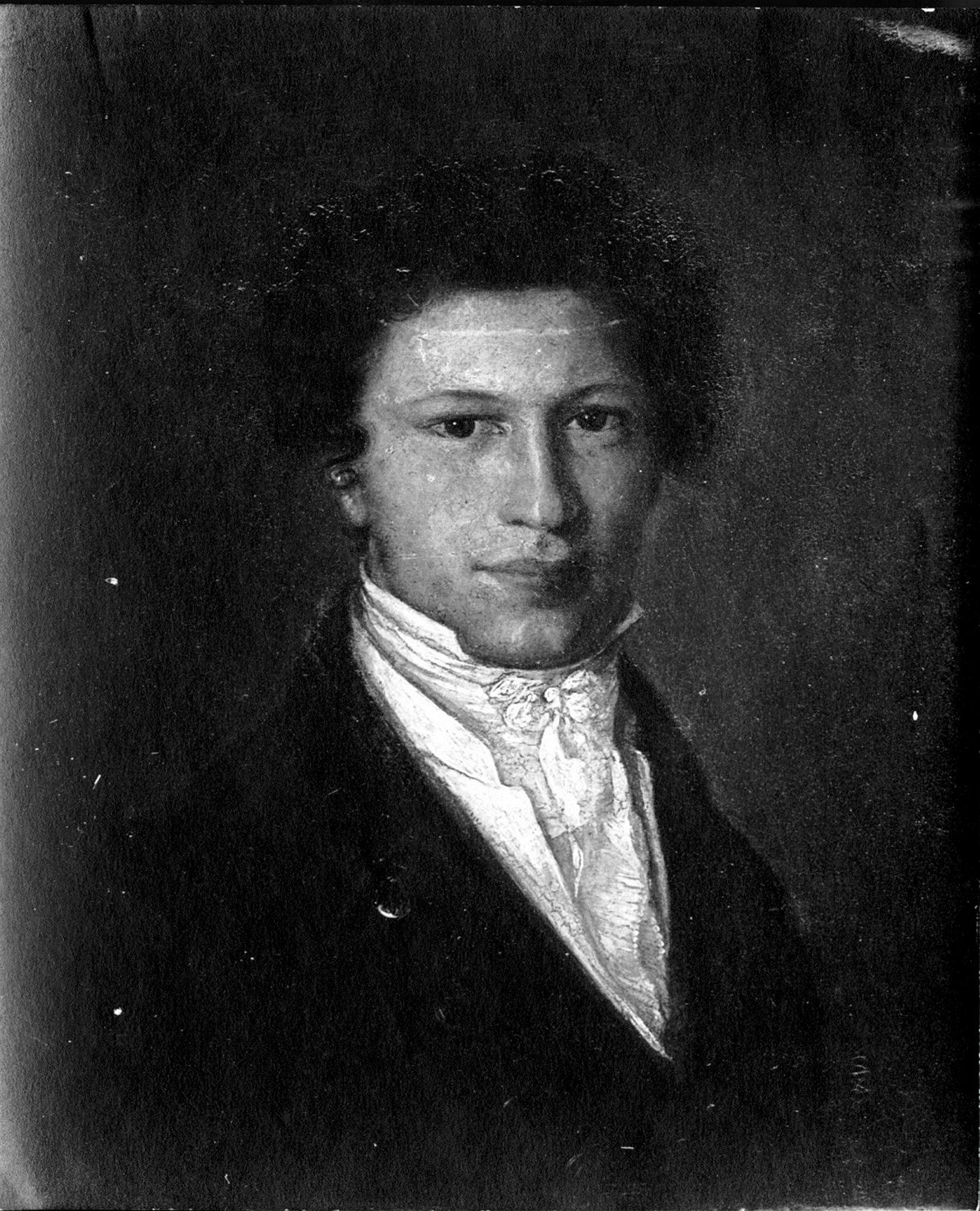

Governor of Nordland
- In office 1834–1847
- Preceded by: Adam Poulsen Trampe
- Succeeded by: Nils Weyer Arveschoug

Personal details
- Born: 27 April 1798 Copenhagen, Denmark
- Died: 13 January 1860 (aged 61) Kragerø, Norway
- Spouse: Caroline Andrea Elieson
- Profession: Politician

Lars Bastian Ridder Stabell (27 April 1798 – 13 January 1860) was a Danish-born Norwegian politician.

== Biography ==
Stabell was born on 27 April 1798, in Copenhagen, to M. H. Stabell and his wife. He entered the military service in 1812 as a cadet. By 1814, he was a Second Lieutenant in a regiment based in Akershus and he participated in the Swedish–Norwegian War. By 1817, he had left military service and became a student. He graduated with a cand.jur. degree in 1822.

Stabell worked as a civil servant in Rakkestad and in the Oslo area for a few years before being named to the post of County Governor of Nordlands amt in 1834. He held the governorship until 1847. During that time, in 1842, he was elected to the Norwegian Parliament representing Nordland county. He served only one term. In 1847, he moved to Kragerø in southeastern Norway to be a civil servant again, this time working in a customs office. He died on 13 January 1860, aged 61, in Kragerø.

Government offices
Preceded by Adam Johan Frederik Poulsen	County Governor of Nordlands amt 1834–1847	Succeeded by Nils Weyer Arveschoug
