= Christoffer Heidemann =

Dano-Norwegian government official

Governor of Nordlandenes amt
- In office 1694–1703
- Preceded by: Peter Christoffersen Tønder
- Succeeded by: Frederik Splet

Personal details
- Born: 1623
- Died: 1703 (aged 79–80) Copenhagen, Denmark-Norway
- Citizenship: Denmark-Norway

Christoffer Heidemann (1623-1703) was a Dano-Norwegian government official. He served as the County Governor of Nordland county from 1694 until his death in 1703.

Government offices
Preceded by Peter Christoffersen Tønder	County Governor of Nordlands amt 1694–1703	Succeeded by Frederik Splet
