= Knud Ovessøn Gjedde =

Danish-Norwegian government official

Governor of Nordlandenes amt
- In office 1669–1686

Acting Governor of Finnmarkens amt
- In office 1680–1681

Personal details
- Born: c. 1635
- Died: c. 1708 Denmark
- Citizenship: Denmark-Norway

Knud Ovessøn Gjedde (c. 1635–c. 1708) was a Danish-Norwegian government official, the son of Ove Gjedde. He served as the first County Governor of Nordland county from 1669 until 1686. He also temporarily served as the acting county governor of Finnmark county from 1680 to 1681.

After serving in Norway as a county governor, he moved to Denmark and was the county governor in Silkeborg amt and Mariager amt from 1686 until his death in 1708.

Government offices
| New creation | County Governor of Nordlandenes amt 1669–1686 | Succeeded by Christian Jørgensen Kruse |
| Preceded by Otte Hansen Bjelke | Acting County Governor of Finnmarkens amt 1680–1681 | Succeeded by Magistrates of Bergen (acting) |
