= Alf Collett =

Norwegian writer and historian (1844–1919)

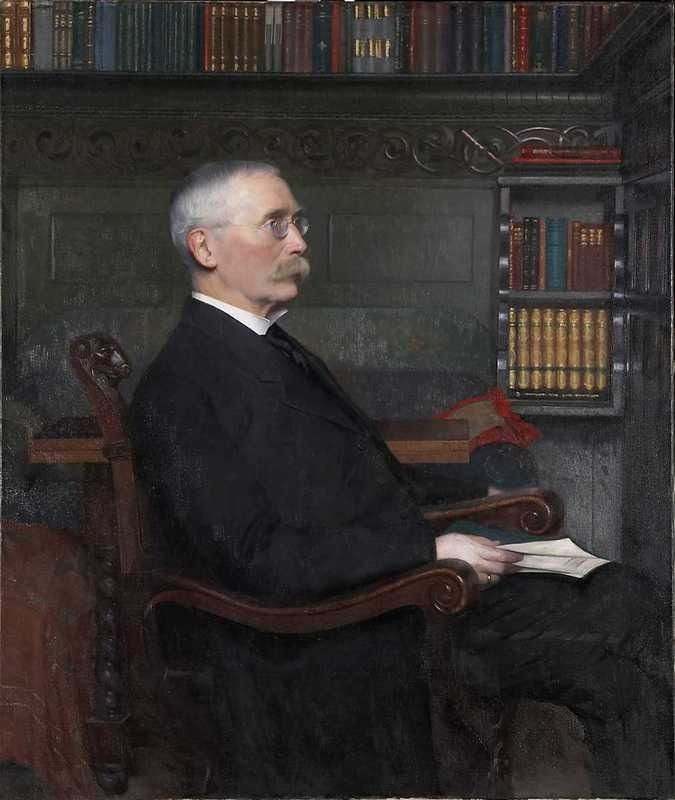
Painting of Alf Collett by Asta Nørregaard from 1915

Alf Collett (8 August 1844 – 12 June 1919) was a Norwegian writer and historian.

== Biography ==
Alf Collett was born at Eidsvoll in Akershus, Norway. He was the second son of professor Peter Jonas Collett (1813-1851) and Camilla Collett (1813-1895). His maternal uncles included Oscar and Henrik Wergeland, and his paternal uncles included Peter Severin Steenstrup. He had one older brother Robert, a notable zoologist, and two younger brothers. He married Mathilda Sophie Kallevig (1845-1915), but they did not have any children.

He attended Oslo Cathedral School. He became cand.jur. in 1865. From 1867 he was employed in the Ministry of Marine and Post Affairs and became bureau chief in 1880. In 1885, he was transferred to the Ministry of Defense and from 1899 to 1919 he was director general of the Naval Administration. He was made a knight 1st Grade of the Order of Saint Olav. He died during 1919 at Kristiania and was buried at Vår Frelsers gravlund

He published many historical and genealogical works, the most important being En gammel Christiania-slægt (1883) and Gamle Christiania-Billeder (1893).

== Selected works ==
- Familien Collett, 1872
- Familien Elieson, 1881
- Fladeby, 1881
- Raadmand Peder Pedersen Müllers Efterkommere, 1881
- Gamle Christiania-Billeder, 1893
- Camilla Colletts livs historie belyst ved hendes breve og dagbøker, 1911
- En gammel Christiania-Slægt, 1883
