= Gerd Janne Kristoffersen =

Norwegian politician (born 1952)

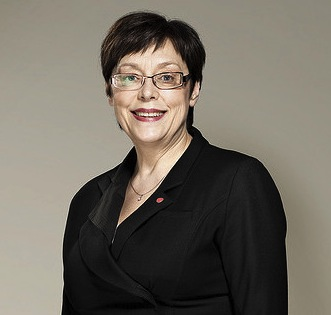

Deputy Governor of Trøndelag
- Incumbent
- Assumed office 1 January 2018
- Prime Minister: Erna Solberg
- Governor: Frank Jenssen

Governor of Nord-Trøndelag (Acting)
- In office 1 October 2017 – 31 December 2017
- Prime Minister: Erna Solberg
- Preceded by: Inge Ryan
- Succeeded by: Position merged with Sør-Trøndelag

Member of the Storting
- In office 1 October 2005 – 30 September 2013
- Constituency: Nord-Trøndelag

Mayor of Verdal Municipality
- In office 1 January 1999 – 1 October 2005
- Preceded by: Knut Einar Steinsli
- Succeeded by: Bjørn Iversen

Personal details
- Born: 18 November 1952 (age 73) Verdal Municipality, Norway
- Party: Labour

Gerd Janne Kristoffersen (born 18 November 1952 in Verdal Municipality) is a Norwegian politician for the Labour Party.

She was elected to the Norwegian Parliament from Nord-Trøndelag in 2005. She had previously served as a deputy representative during the term 2001–2005.

Kristoffersen was a member of the executive committee of the municipal council of Verdal Municipality from 1991 to 1995, later serving as mayor from 1999 to 2005. From 1995 to 1999 she was a member of Nord-Trøndelag county council.

Before entering politics she worked at Levanger Hospital.

Civic offices
Preceded by Inge Ryan	County Governor of Nord-Trøndelag (acting); 2017	Position merged into County Governor of Trøndelag
