= Carsten Smith (1817–1884) =

Norwegian civil servant and politician

Governor of Nordre Trondhjem
- In office 1867–1884
- Preceded by: Fredrik August Wessel-Berg
- Succeeded by: Lars Otto Roll Grundt

Governor of Nordland
- In office 1858–1867
- Preceded by: Paul Peter Vilhelm Breder
- Succeeded by: Claus Nieuwejaar Worsøe

Personal details
- Born: 20 April 1817 Grimstad, Norway
- Died: 11 March 1884 (aged 66) Inderøy, Norway
- Citizenship: Norway
- Profession: Politician, civil servant

Carsten Smith (1817–1884) was a Norwegian civil servant and politician. He was the county governor of Nordland county from 1858 until 1867. He then became the county governor of Nordre Trondhjem county from 1867 until his death in 1884.

Government offices
Preceded by Paul Peter Vilhelm Breder	County Governor of Nordlands amt 1858–1867	Succeeded by Claus Nieuwejaar Worsøe
Preceded by Fredrik August Wessel-Berg	County Governor of Nordre Trondhjems amt 1867–1884	Succeeded by Lars Otto Roll Grundt
