= Ove Sørensen Schjelderup =

Norwegian government official

Governor of Nordlandenes amt
- In office 1704–1751
- Preceded by: Frederik Splet
- Succeeded by: Hans Hagerup de Gyldenpalm

Personal details
- Born: 1674 Trondheim, Norway
- Died: 1756 (aged 81–82) Norway
- Citizenship: Norway
- Profession: Politician

Ove Sørensen Schjelderup (1674–1756) was a Norwegian government official. He was educated at the University of Copenhagen. He was given the job of prosecutor for the Supreme Court of the Kingdom of Denmark-Norway in 1697. In 1704 he was appointed to be the County Governor of Nordland county, a position he held from 1704 until his retirement in 1751.

He was the grandson of Peder Jenssøn Schjelderup. He married Kristin Hansdatter Munch in 1715. She was the daughter of Hans Munch, the Bishop of Christiania.

Government offices
Preceded by Frederik Splet	County Governor of Nordlands amt 1704–1751	Succeeded by Hans Hagerup de Gyldenpalm
