= Peter Holm (politician) =

Governor of Lister og Mandals amt
- In office 1773–1805
- Preceded by: Frederik Georg Adeler
- Succeeded by: Hans Vilhelm Cederfeld de Simonsen

Governor of Bratsberg amt
- In office 1771–1773
- Preceded by: Frederik Georg Adeler
- Succeeded by: Frederik Georg Adeler

Governor of Nordland
- In office 1767–1771
- Preceded by: Hans Hagerup Gyldenpalm
- Succeeded by: Joachim de Knagenhielm

Personal details
- Born: 1733 Nyborg, Denmark
- Died: 1817 (aged 83–84) Christianssand, Norway
- Citizenship: Denmark-Norway then Norway

Peter Holm (1733–1817) was a government official and topographical writer in Denmark-Norway. He served as a County Governor for three different counties in Norway. He was the County Governor of Nordland county from 1767–1771, of Bratsberg county from 1771–1773, and of Lister og Mandal county from 1773 until his retirement on 31 December 1805. After the union between Denmark and Norway ended in 1814. Holm did not return to his birth country of Denmark, but stayed in Norway, and died in Christiansand in 1817.

Government offices
Preceded by Hans Hagerup Gyldenpalm	County Governor of Nordlands amt 1767–1771	Succeeded by Joachim de Knagenhielm
Preceded by Frederik Georg Adeler	County Governor of Bratsberg amt 1771–1773	Succeeded by Frederik Georg Adeler
Preceded by Frederik Georg Adeler	County Governor of Lister og Mandals amt 1773–1805	Succeeded by Hans Vilhelm Cederfeld de Simonsen
