= Åshild Hauan =

Norwegian politician

Governor of Nordland
- In office 1991–2007
- Preceded by: Odd With
- Succeeded by: Hill-Marta Solberg

Personal details
- Born: 20 April 1941 Velfjord Municipality, Reichskommissariat Norwegen (today Norway)
- Died: 1 December 2017 (aged 76) Bodø, Norway
- Citizenship: Norway
- Parents: Paul Drevland (father); Gunnvor Wester (mother)
- Profession: Politician

Åshild Hauan (20 April 1941–1 December 2017) was a Norwegian politician for the Labour Party. She served as the County Governor of Nordland county from 1991 until 2007.

== Personal life ==
She was born on 20 April 1941 in Velfjord Municipality in southern Nordland county in Norway. Her parents were sawmill owner Paul Drevland (1914-1978) and homemaker Gunnvor Wester (1919-1979). She married Åsbjørn Hauan and had two children, and later three grandchildren. She died of cancer on 1 December 2017 in the town of Bodø in Nordland county, Norway.

== Education and career ==
She held various positions on the municipal council of Rana Municipality between 1975 and 1983. Hauan was a member of Nordland county council between 1979 and 1983.

She served in the position of deputy representative in the Parliament of Norway during the term from 1977–1981. She was then elected as a full representative from Nordland county in 1981, and she was re-elected in 1985 and again in 1989, serving until 1993. Hauan was President of the Odelsting from 1985–1989.

During her third term in Parliament, she was named County Governor in 1991. Since she was still serving in the Parliament of Norway at that time, Davis Idin Pareli Johansen was named the acting governor. He served for her from 1991 until 1993 when she completed her term in Parliament and moved to Bodø to begin working as governor.

Government offices
| Preceded by Odd With | County Governor of Nordland; 1993–2007; She was in Parliament from 1991-1993. Davis Johansen was acting governor during that time. | Succeeded by Ola Bjerkaas (acting for Hill-Marta Solberg) |
