= Joachim de Knagenhielm =

Norwegian civil servant and politician

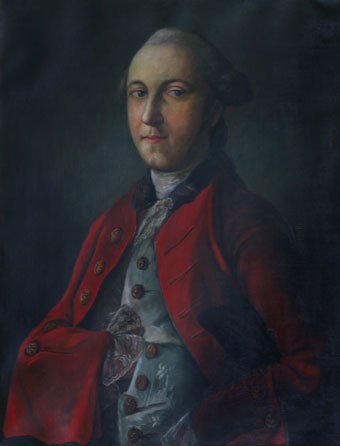

Governor of Nordland
- In office 1771–1789
- Preceded by: Peter Holm
- Succeeded by: Christian Torberg Hegge

Governor of Nordre Bergenhus amt
- In office 1763–1771
- Succeeded by: Magnus Theiste

Personal details
- Born: 29 May 1727 Kaupanger, Norway
- Died: 16 February 1796 (aged 68) Bodø, Norway
- Citizenship: Norway
- Profession: Politician

Joachim de Knagenhielm (1727–1796) was a Norwegian civil servant and politician from the noble Knagenhjelm family. He served as the first County Governor of Nordre Bergenhus county from 1763 until 1771. He was then appointed as the County Governor of Nordland county from 1771 until his retirement in 1789.

Government offices
New office (Bergenhus amt was divided into: Nordre Bergenhus and Søndre Bergenhus)	County Governor of Nordre Bergenhus amt 1763–1771	Succeeded by Magnus Theiste
Preceded by Peter Holm	County Governor of Nordlands amt 1771–1789	Succeeded by Christian Torberg Hegge
