= Ola Bjerkaas =

Norwegian politician (born 1952)

Acting Governor of Nordland
- In office 2008–2009
- Preceded by: Åshild Hauan
- Succeeded by: Hill-Marta Solberg

Personal details
- Born: 25 November 1952 (age 73) Norway
- Citizenship: Norway
- Profession: Politician

Ola Bjerkaas (born 1952) is a Norwegian politician. He served as the acting County Governor of Nordland county from 2008 until 2009 while Hill-Marta Solberg was finishing up her term in the Parliament of Norway.

Government offices
Preceded by Åshild Hauan	Acting County Governor of Nordland; 2008–2009 (acting for Hill-Marta Solberg)	Succeeded by Hill-Marta Solberg
