= Oddbjørn Nordset =

Norwegian politician

Oddbjørn Karmhus Nordset (born 25 March 1946) is a Norwegian civil servant and politician for the Centre Party.

He took an agricultural education, graduating from the Norwegian College of Agriculture with the cand.agric. degree in 1973. Before enrolling at the Norwegian College of Agriculture, he was a secretary for the Centre Party in Nord-Trøndelag. After three years as a consultant in the Ministry of Agriculture from 1973 to 1976, Nordset was appointed as a county agronomist in Nord‑Trøndelag. Then, after a period from 1983 to 1986 as State Secretary in the Ministry of Agriculture, he was promoted to chief county agronomist. He remained in this post until 1991, when he served for two years as acting County Governor of Nord-Trøndelag. He was then the Assisting County Governor from 1994 to 2002 and 2003 to 2008. In 2008 he started his second period as acting County Governor, as Inger Lise Gjørv retired. He was succeeded by Inge Ryan in 2009.

Nordset is also the chair of the National Veterinary Institute.

Civic offices
Preceded by Ola H. Kveli	County Governor of Nord-Trøndelag (acting); 1991–1993	Succeeded by Inger Lise Gjørv
Preceded by Inger Lise Gjørv	County Governor of Nord-Trøndelag (acting); 2008–2009	Succeeded by Inge Ryan
