= Lars Otto Roll Grundt =

Norwegian jurist (1843–1907)

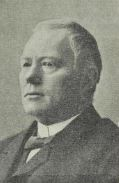
- Lars Otto Roll Grundt (1843–1907)

Governor of Nordre Trondhjem
- In office 1884–1894
- Preceded by: Carsten Smith
- Succeeded by: Ole Anton Qvam

Governor of Søndre Trondhjem
- In office 1894–1907
- Preceded by: Carl Frederik Motzfeldt
- Succeeded by: Harald Bothner

Personal details
- Born: 15 April 1843 Moss, Norway
- Died: 24 July 1907 (aged 64) Saxony
- Citizenship: Norway
- Profession: Politician

Lars Otto Roll Grundt (1843–1907) was a Norwegian civil servant and politician. He served as the County Governor of Nordre Trondhjems county from 1884 until 1894 and as the County Governor of Søndre Trondhjems county from 1894 until his death in 1907.

He took his Examen artium at the Christiania Cathedral School in 1859, then got his cand.jur. degree in 1864. He worked as a clerk at the Supreme Court of Norway from 1864 to 1865. Next, he worked in the local government offices in Hamar from 1865 to 1867. He then worked for the Ministry of Justice, starting as a secretary and working his way up to the chief of staff during the period from 1867 to 1884. After that, he began serving as a County Governor from 1884 until his death in 1907, first in Nordre Trondhjems county, then in the neighboring Søndre Trondhjems county.

He was appointed knight of the Order of St. Olav in 1887 and on 21 January 1895, he was promoted to commander of the 1st class of the Order of St. Olav. He was married to Signe Kyhn, daughter of the County Governor of Hedmark, Ludvig R. Kyhn.

Government offices
| Preceded by Carsten Smith | County Governor of Nordre Trondhjems amt 1884–1894 | Succeeded by Ole Anton Qvam |
| Preceded by Carl Frederik Motzfeldt | County Governor of Søndre Trondhjems amt 1894–1907 | Succeeded by Harald Bothner |
