= Gustav Peter Blom =

Norwegian politician

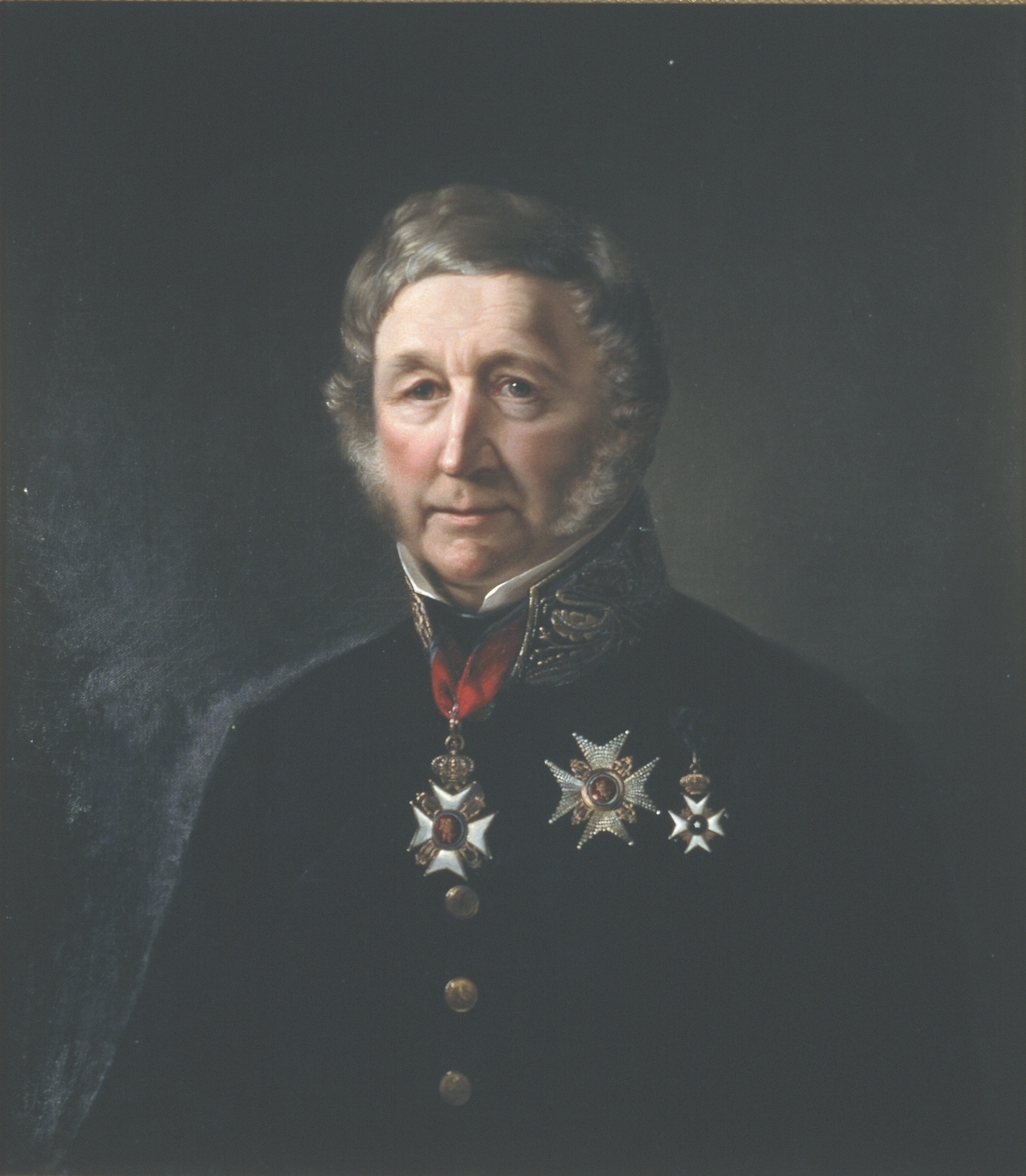
Gustav Peter Blom

Gustav Peter Blom (4 July 1785 – 28 October 1869) was a Norwegian civil servant, politician and historian. He was a member of the Norwegian Constitutional Assembly at Eidsvoll during 1814.

Blom was born at Hurum in Buskerud, Norway. Blom took his law degree in 1807 and worked as district stipendiary magistrate (sorenskriver) in Nordre Jarlsberg. He was later appointed stipendiary magistrate (byfoged) and town clerk (byskriver) in Drammen. While stationed there, he was elected to the Norwegian Parliament in 1830.

He was later County Governor of Buskerud Amt (now Buskerud) from 1831 to 1857. While serving in this capacity, he was also elected to the Norwegian Parliament in 1833, 1836, 1839, 1842 and 1848. From 15 July to 18 July 1852 and from 11 October 1852 to 12 April 1853 he was an acting member of the Council of State Division in interim in Stockholm, founded during King Oscar I's absence.

Preceded by Niels Arntzen Sem	County Governor of Buskerud; 1831–1857	Succeeded by Paul Peter Vilhelm Breder
