= Paul Peter Vilhelm Breder =

Norwegian politician (1816–1890)

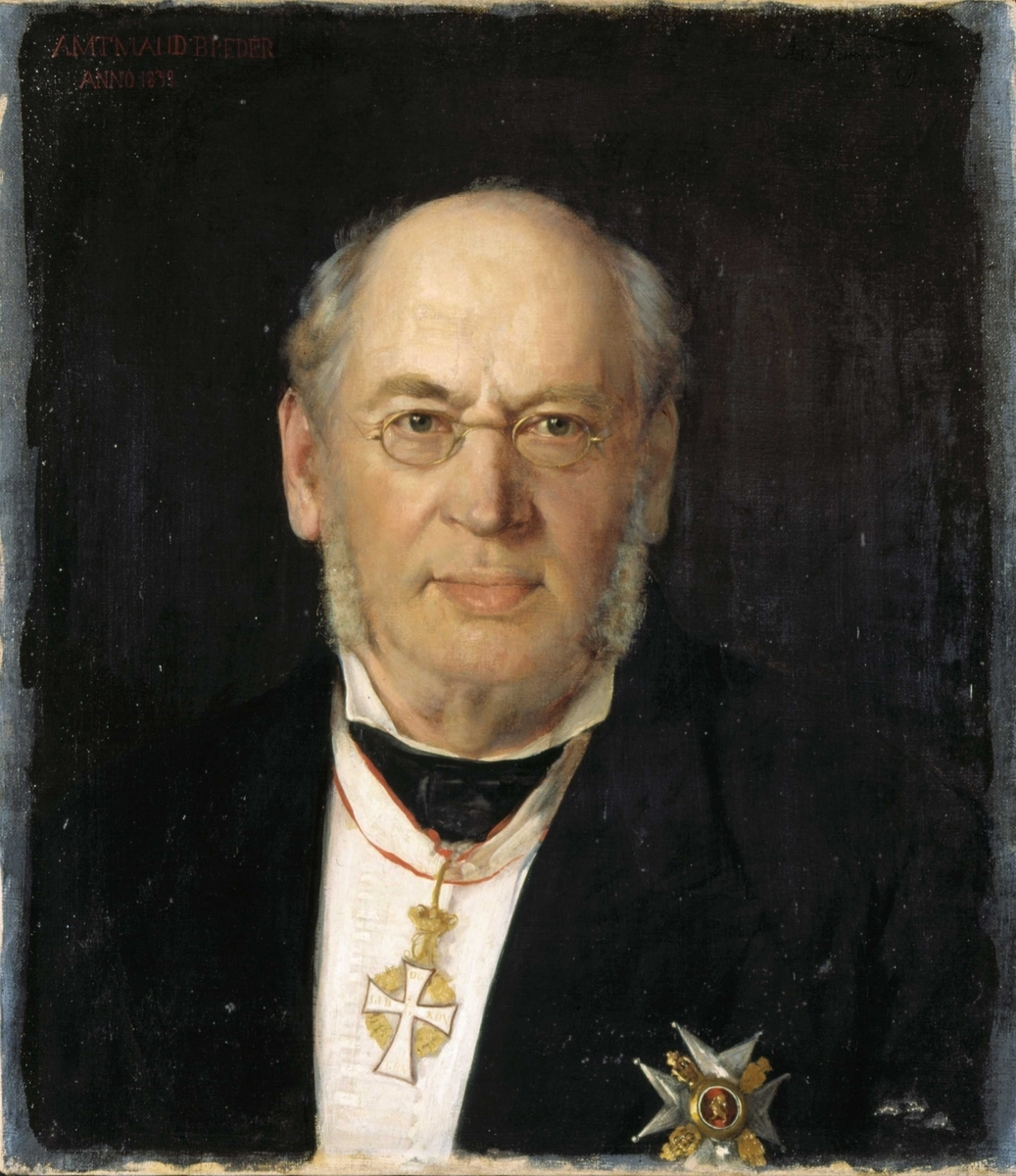
- Paul Peter Vilhelm Breder; portrait by Asta Nørregaard

Governor of Buskerud
- In office 1858–1882
- Preceded by: Gustav Peter Blom
- Succeeded by: Thomas Cathinco Bang

Governor of Nordland
- In office 1854–1858
- Preceded by: Nils Weyer Arveschoug
- Succeeded by: Carsten Smith

Personal details
- Born: 10 April 1816 Halden, Norway
- Died: 15 January 1890 (aged 73) Norway
- Citizenship: Norway
- Profession: Politician

Paul Peter Vilhelm Breder (10 April 1816–15 January 1890) was a Norwegian civil servant, lawyer, and politician. He was born in Halden, Norway in 1816 and died in Drammen in 1890.

From 1854 to 1858 he was County Governor of Nordlands amt. He was elected to the Norwegian Parliament in 1857, representing Nordland county from 1857 to 1858. In 1858, he was named the County Governor of Buskeruds amt, a position that he held until 1882. After that he became a customs official based out of Drammen.

Government offices
Preceded by Nils Weyer Arveschoug	County Governor of Nordlands amt 1854–1858	Succeeded by Carsten Smith
Preceded by Gustav Peter Blom	County Governor of Buskeruds amt 1858–1882	Succeeded by Thomas Cathinco Bang
