= Nils Weyer Arveschoug =

Norwegian lawyer and politician

Governor of Romsdalen
- In office 1853–1893
- Preceded by: Gudbrand Thesen
- Succeeded by: Ludvig Arnoldus Leth

Governor of Nordland
- In office 1848–1853
- Preceded by: Lars Bastian Ridder Stabell
- Succeeded by: Paul Peter Vilhelm Breder

Personal details
- Born: 2 January 1807 Skoger, Norway
- Died: 29 March 1894 (aged 87) Molde, Norway
- Citizenship: Norway
- Profession: Politician

Nils Weyer Arveschoug (1807–1894) was a Norwegian lawyer and politician. He was the county governor of Nordlands amt from 1848 until 1853. He was then appointed to the post of county governor of Romsdals amt from 1853 until 1893, making him the longest-serving governor in history in Norway.

Government offices
Preceded by Lars Bastian Ridder Stabell	County Governor of Nordlands amt 1848–1853	Succeeded by Paul Peter Vilhelm Breder
Preceded by Gudbrand Thesen	County Governor of Romsdalens amt 1853–1893	Succeeded by Ludvig Arnoldus Leth
