= Johan Ernst Berg =

Norwegian politician

Governor of Nordland
- In office 1815–1828
- Preceded by: Christen Elster
- Succeeded by: Adam Poulsen Trampe

Personal details
- Born: 19 October 1768 Strinda, Norway
- Died: 15 October 1828 (aged 59) Bodin, Norway
- Citizenship: Norway
- Profession: Politician

Johan Ernst Berg (19 October 1768 – 15 October 1828) was a Norwegian jurist, politician, and civil servant.

Berg was born on the Blussuvoll farm in the parish of Strinda in Søndre Trøndhjems amt, Norway. He was the son of a farmer Haaken Larsen Blussuvolden.

He graduated as a lawyer in 1795 (during the time of Denmark–Norway) and became an agent with the Danish general post in 1802. In 1803, he became bailiff in the Salten district of Nordland county. In 1815, he was appointed to the post of County Governor of Nordlands amt. During his time in office, he was also elected to the Norwegian Parliament in 1815-1817 and 1826, representing the county in which he lived. During his time as governor, the diplomatic scandal known as the Bodø affair took place. He held the post of county governor until his death in 1828.

Government offices
Preceded by Christen Elster	County Governor of Nordlands amt 1815–1828	Succeeded by Adam Johan Frederik Poulsen Trampe
