= Asta Nørregaard =

Norwegian artist (1853–1933)

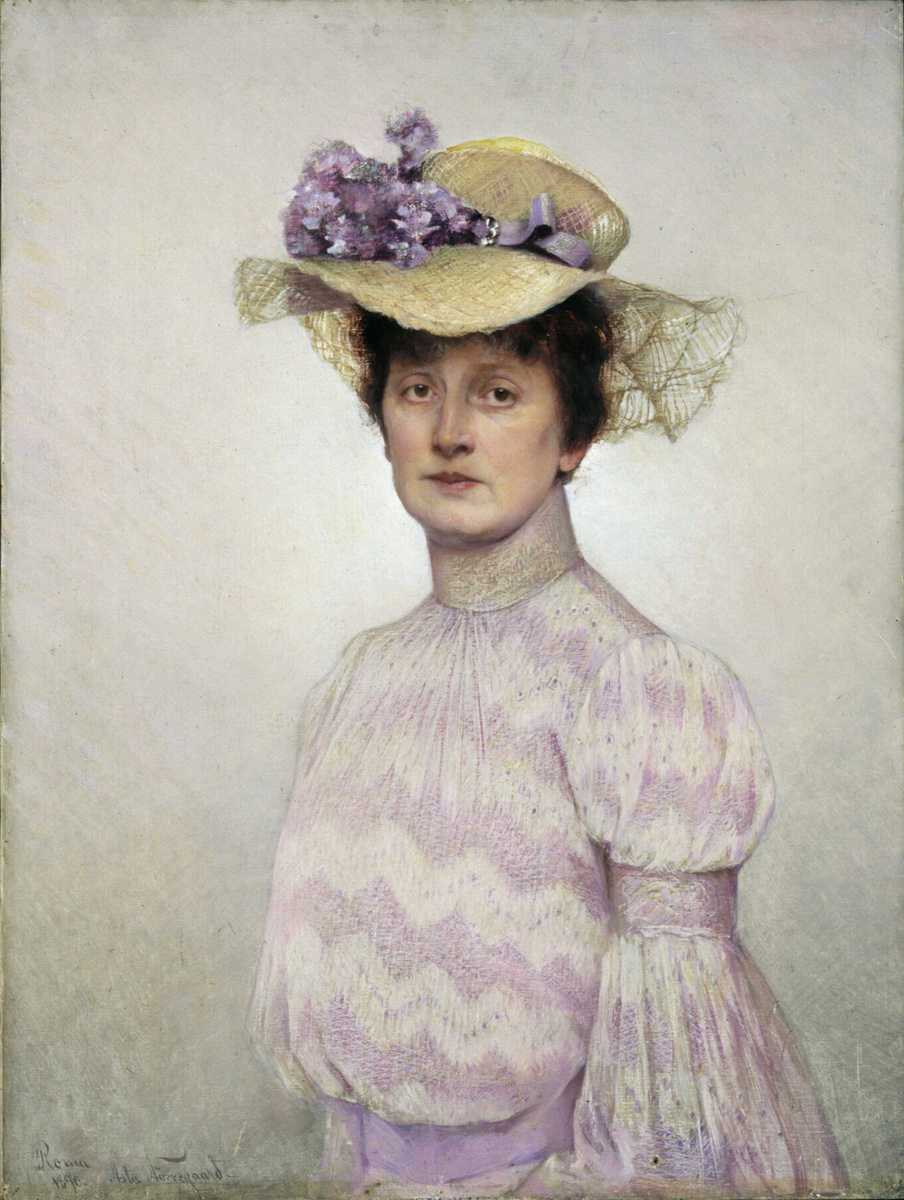
- Self-portrait
- Born: August 13, 1853; Oslo, Norway
- Died: March 23, 1933 (aged 79); Oslo, Norway
- Known for: Painting

Asta Nørregaard (13 August 1853 – 23 March 1933) was a Norwegian painter who is best known for her portraits.

== Biography ==
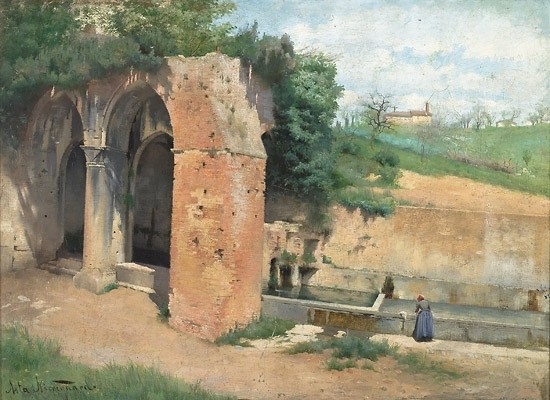
At a Spring with Ancient Ruins, Italy

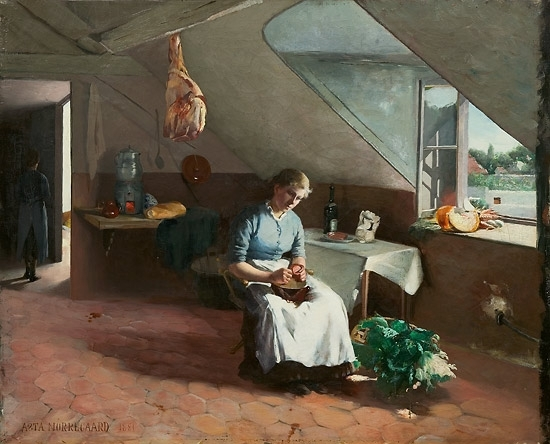
French Kitchen Interior, 1881

Nørregaard was born in Christiania (now Oslo), Norway. She was the daughter of Hans Peter Nørregaard (1818–1872) and Elise Jacobine Hesselberg (1821–1853). She and an older sister were orphaned early and both remained unmarried.

Nørregaard received her early education at the Knud Bergslien painting school; one of her classmates was Harriet Backer. From 1875 to 1878 she was a pupil of Eilif Peterssen in Munich. During 1879, she studied in Paris.

Nørregaard held solo exhibitions at Blomqvist Kunsthandel in 1893, 1903, 1913 and 1925. She was also a frequent exhibitor at group exhibitions: Salon de Paris in 1881 and 1882, and world exhibitions in Antwerp in 1885 and Paris 1889. She received the King's Medal of Merit in gold in 1920.

Her work is exhibited at the Munch Museum, Oslo City Museum, University of Oslo and National Gallery in Oslo. Nørregaard was included in the touring 2018 exhibit Women in Paris 1850-1900, which was organized by the American Federation of Arts. In 2026, the National Museum of Norway presented almost 50 of the painter’s key works in a major retrospective, “Asta Norregaard: Truth and Beauty".

== Selected works ==
- Paul Breder, 1879
- Anette Birch 1882
- L'attente de Christ 1881
- Maggie Plahte, 1881
- Maggie reiseklar, 1881
- Asta Norregaard Fransk kjokkeninterior, 1881
- Villiers-le-Bel, 1881
- Carl Paul Caspari, 1885
- Edvard Munch, 1885
- Gisle Johnson, 1885
- Musikkinteriør, 1885
- Bondekone fra Normandie, ca. 1887–89
- Angelo, 1888
- Lesende dame ved vindu, 1888
- Midnattsmesse i et fransk kloster, 1888–89
- Elisabeth Fearnley, 1892
- Martine Cappelen Hjort, 1897
- Dagny Kiær, 1899
- Niels August Andresen Butenschøn, 1900
- Marie Andresen Butenschøn, 1904
- Harald Løvenskiold, 1905

== Portraits ==
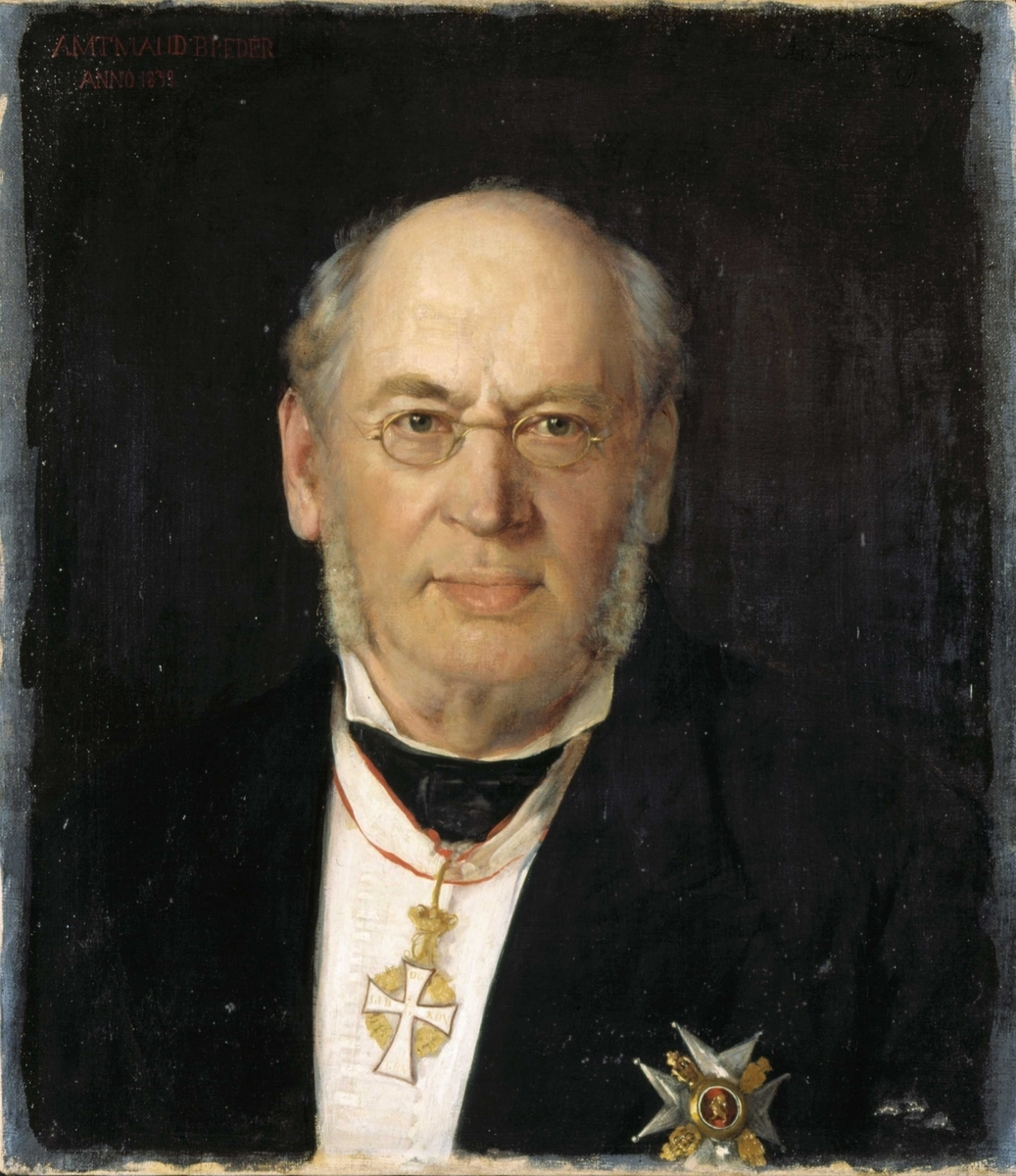
Paul Breder
1879

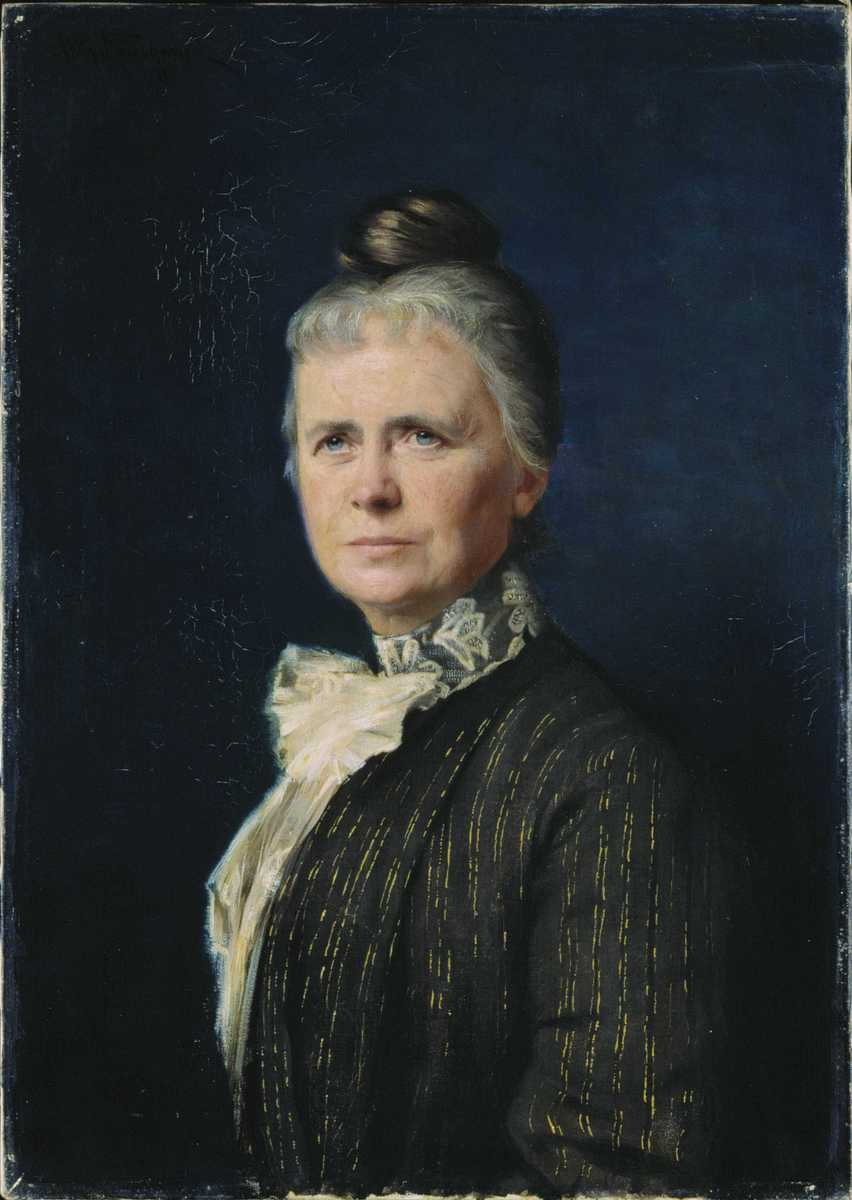
Ragna Nielsen
ca 1900

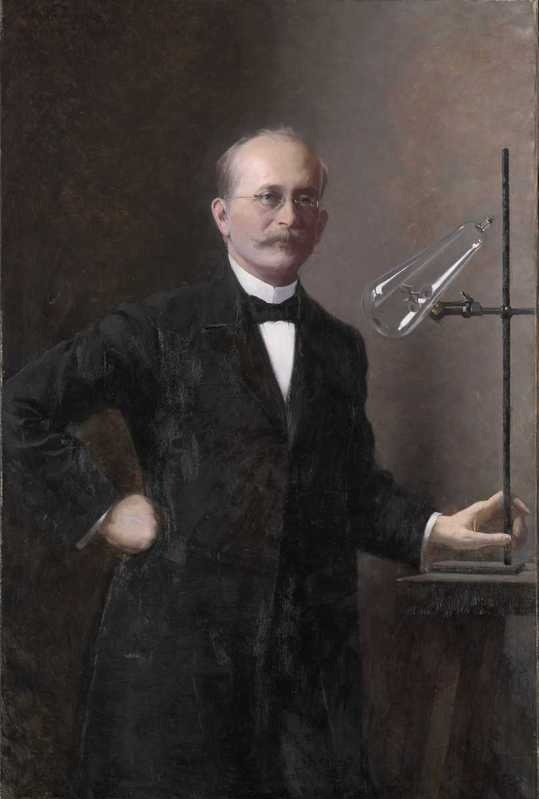
Kristian Birkeland
1902

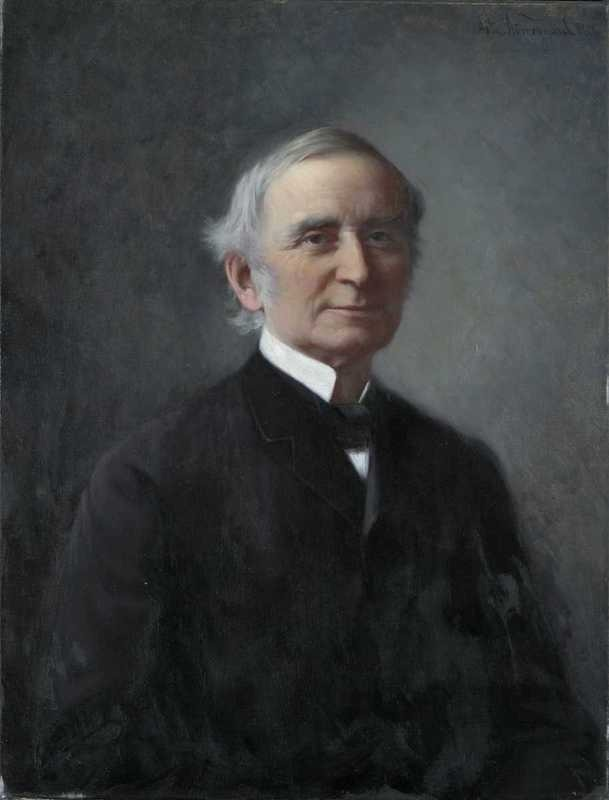
Harald Wedel-Jarlsberg
1914

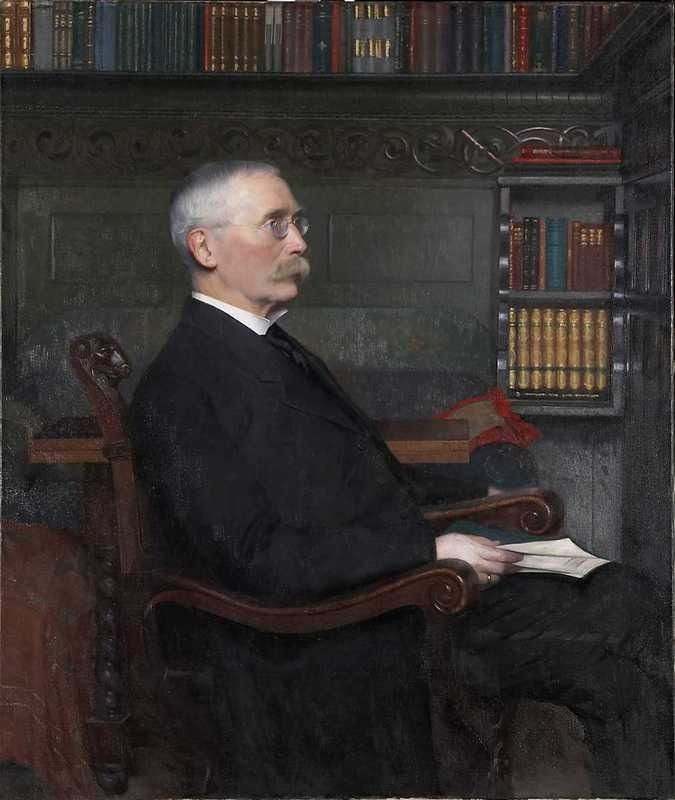
Alf Collett
1915
