= Hill-Marta Solberg =

Norwegian politician

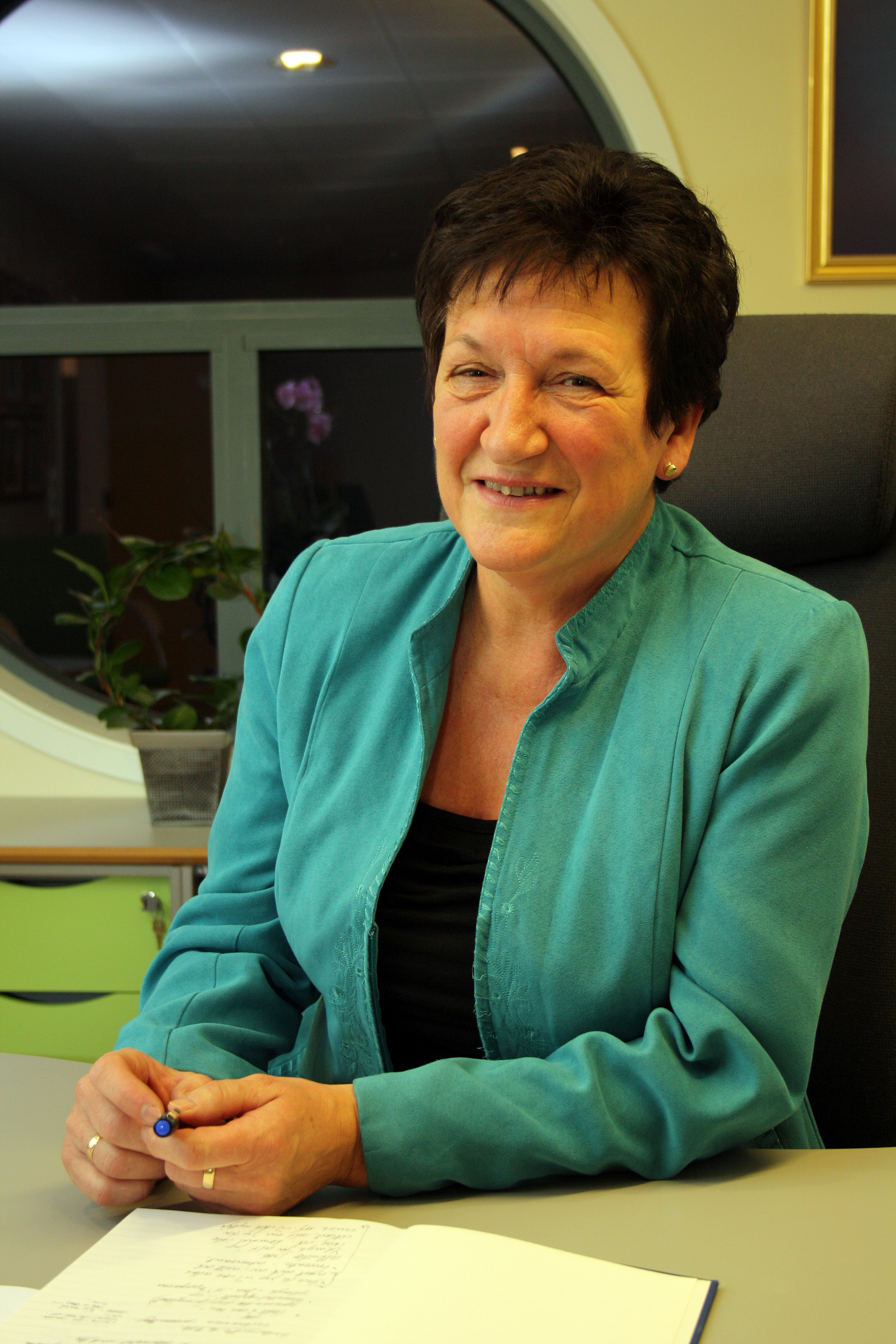
- Solberg in Bodø (2009)

Governor of Nordland
- In office 2009 – 15 November 2018
- Monarch: Harald V
- Prime Minister: Jens Stoltenberg; Erna Solberg
- Preceded by: Åshild Hauan
- Succeeded by: Tom Cato Karlsen

Deputy Leader of the Labour Party
- In office 8 November 1992 – 22 April 2007
- Leader: Thorbjørn Jagland; Jens Stoltenberg
- Preceded by: Thorbjørn Berntsen
- Succeeded by: Helga Pedersen

Minister of Health and Social Affairs
- In office 24 January 1994 – 17 October 1997
- Prime Minister: Gro Harlem Brundtland; Thorbjørn Jagland
- Preceded by: Grete Knudsen
- Succeeded by: Magnhild Meltveit Kleppa

Mayor of Sortland Municipality
- In office 1 January 1988 – 31 December 1993
- Preceded by: Anton Pettersen
- Succeeded by: Ronald Steen

Personal details
- Born: 12 November 1951 (age 74) Sortland, Norway
- Citizenship: Norway
- Party: Labour
- Profession: Politician

Hill-Marta Solberg (born 12 November 1951, in Sortland Municipality) is a Norwegian politician for the Labour Party. During her career, she was a parliamentary representative for Nordland county from 1993-2009. She was the Minister of Health and Social Affairs for three years and then was the County Governor of Nordland county for nearly ten years. She retired on 15 November 2018.

== Personal life ==
Hill-Marta Solberg was born on 12 November 1951 in Sortland Municipality in Nordland county, Norway to Arne J. Hansen and Borghild Jensen.

== Education and career ==
Solberg took her Examen artium in 1970. She then went to the Trondheim teacher's school and got her degree in 1974. She began her teaching career in Mo i Rana during the 1975-1976 school year. She then moved to Harstad to teach the next year, and then she moved to Sortland to teach from 1977-1987. From 1983-1987, she served on the municipal council of Sortland Municipality. She resigned from teaching in 1987 to run for mayor of Sortland Municipality, a position that she won. She served as mayor from 1988 until 1993.

During her political career, she rose to the position of Deputy Leader of the Labour Party and held that position from 1992 until 1997.

Solberg was elected to represent Nordland in the Parliament of Norway in 1993. She served four consecutive terms in Parliament until 2009. During her time in Parliament, she served in the cabinets of Prime Ministers Gro Harlem Brundtland and Thorbjørn Jagland as the Minister of Health and Social Affairs from 1 January 1994 until 17 October 1997.

As she was serving in her final term in Parliament, the Cabinet of Norway named her to the position of County Governor of Nordland county in 2007. Since she was still serving in Parliament at that time, Ola Bjerkaas served as the acting governor from 2007 until the end of her parliamentary term in 2009 when she assumed the governorship. She served as governor until her retirement on 15 November 2018.

From 2009-2018, she was the chair of the board for Vinmonopolet, the Norwegian government alcoholic beverage retailer.

Political offices
Preceded by Grete Knudsen	Norwegian Minister of Health and Social Affairs; 24 January 1994–17 October 1997	Succeeded by Magnhild Meltveit Kleppa
Government offices
Preceded by Åshild Hauan	County Governor of Nordland; 2007–2018; She also served in Parliament during 2007-2009. Ola Bjerkaas was acting governor during that time	Succeeded by Tom Cato Karlsen
Business positions
Preceded by Siri Hatlen	Chair of Vinmonopolet; 2009–2018	Succeeded by Ellen Seip
