= Tom Cato Karlsen =

Norwegian politician and physician

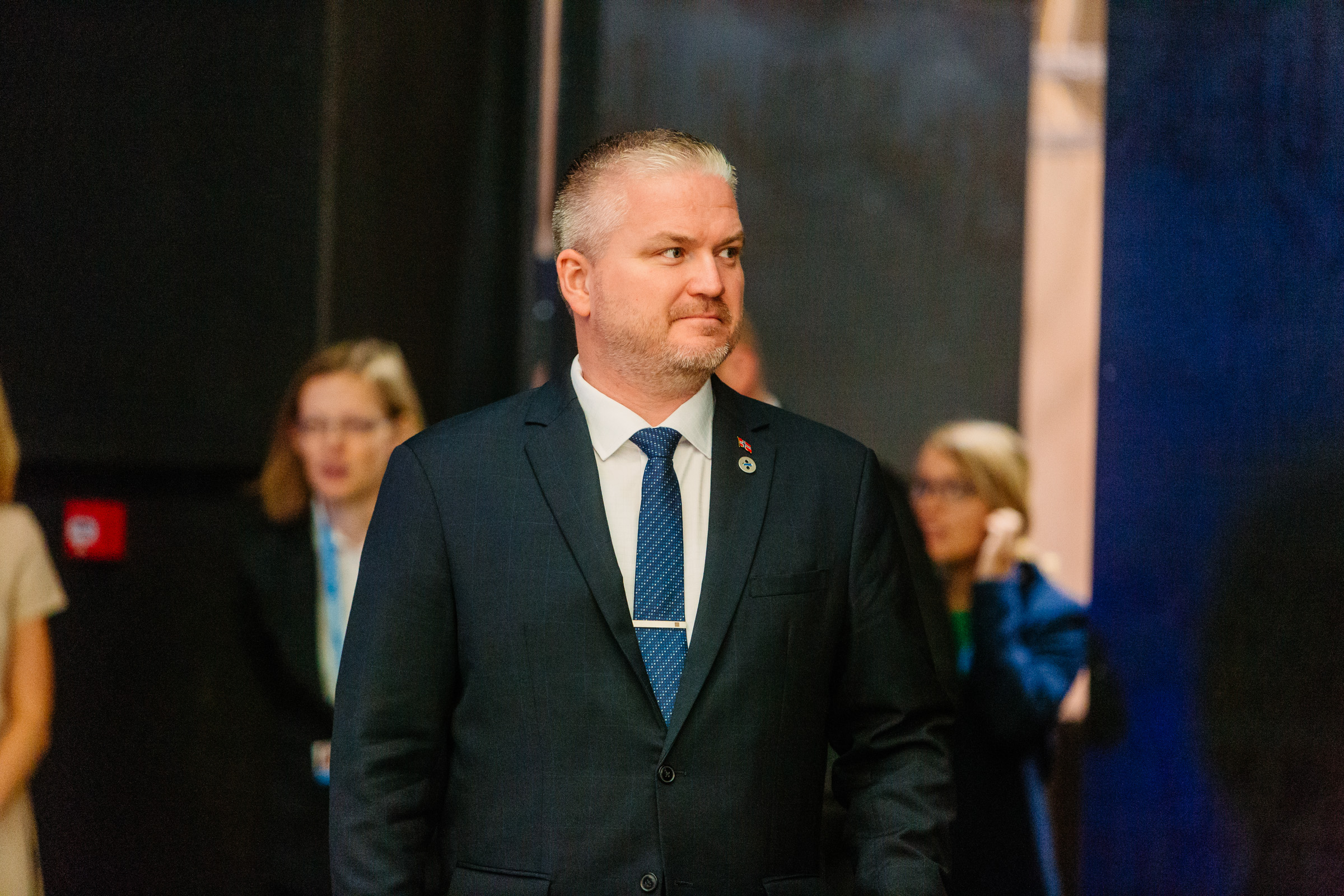

County Governor of Nordland
- Incumbent
- Assumed office 1 January 2019
- Monarch: Harald V
- Prime Minister: Erna Solberg; Jonas Gahr Støre
- Preceded by: Hill-Marta Solberg

Deputy Mayor of Bodø
- In office October 2011 – 17 October 2014
- Mayor: Ole-Henrik Hjartøy
- Preceded by: Kirsten Hasvoll
- Succeeded by: Allan Ellingsen

State Secretary for the Ministry of Transport and Communications
- In office 17 October 2014 – 1 December 2017
- Prime Minister: Erna Solberg
- Minister: Ketil Solvik-Olsen

Personal details
- Born: 24 June 1974 (age 51) Norway
- Citizenship: Norway
- Party: Progress
- Occupation: Anesthesiologist
- Profession: Politician

Tom Cato Karlsen (born 24 June 1974) is a Norwegian politician and anesthesiologist. He was served as a deputy representative for the Storting for Nordland county from 2013 to 2017 and as a state secretary for the Ministry of Transport and Communications from 2014 to 2017. On 26 October 2018, he was appointed to be the new County Governor of Nordland county, assuming office on 1 January 2019.

== Political career ==
=== Local politics ===
Karlsen was a member of the Bodø Municipal Council between 2003 and 2015. During this time he also served as deputy mayor of Bodø between 2011 and 2014, when he resigned to become state secretary at the Ministry of Transport. He was succeeded by Allan Ellingsen.

=== State Secretary ===
Karlsen was appointed as state secretary to the Ministry of Transport on 17 October 2014. He resigned from the post on 1 December 2017, sighting family reasons and returned to his civilian job in his native Bodø.

=== County governor ===
Karlsen was appointed county governor of Nordland on 26 October 2018 and assumed office on 1 January 2019, succeeding Hill-Marta Solberg. He was renominated for a second six-year-term in April 2024, commencing from 1 January 2025.

Government offices
Preceded by Hill-Marta Solberg	County Governor of Nordland; 2019–	Incumbent
