= Caspar Conrad Rafn =

Dano-Norwegian government official

Governor of Nordre Trondhjem
- In office 1805–1815
- Succeeded by: Christen Elster

Personal details
- Born: 4 September 1763 Viborg, Denmark-Norway
- Died: 15 August 1830 (aged 66) Randers, Denmark
- Citizenship: Denmark
- Education: Cand.jur.

Caspar Conrad Rafn (1763–1830) was a Dano-Norwegian politician. He served as the first County Governor of Nordre Trondhjems county from 1805 until 1815. During his time as County Governor, he lived at Gudmundhus in Verdal. In late 1814, when the Kingdom of Denmark-Norway was dissolved and the Kingdom of Norway was joined in a personal union with Sweden, he announced his resignation. In 1815, he left Norway and moved back to Denmark. He became a government official in Randers for a time and then later was a judge in Nørhald, Støvring, Galten municipalities.

Rafn was born in 1763 in Viborg in Denmark-Norway and he died in 1830 in Randers in Denmark.

Government offices
New office Trondhjems amt was divided into two counties, Nordre Trondhjem and Søndre Trondhjem, each with their own governor.	County Governor of Nordre Trondhjems amt 1805–1815	Succeeded by Christen Elster
