= Jens Christian Berg =

Norwegian lawyer and historian (1775–1852)

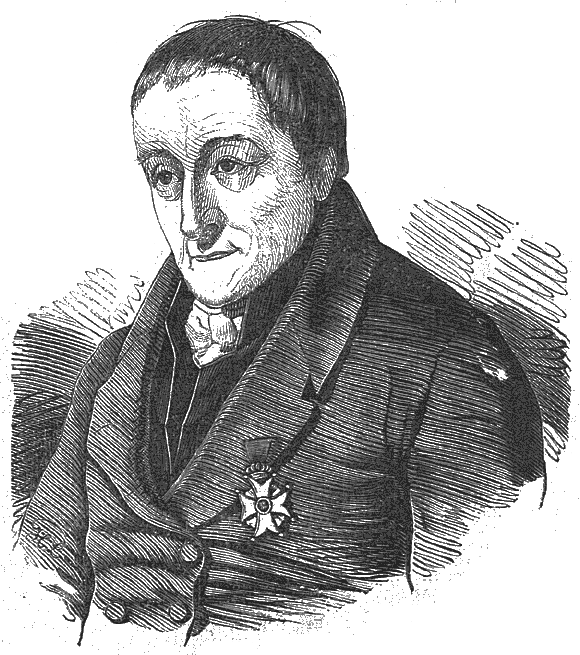
Jens Christian Berg

Jens Christian Berg (23 September 1775 – 4 June 1852) was a Norwegian lawyer and historian.

== Biography ==
Jens Christian Berg was born in Copenhagen to Niels Jensen Berg (1738-1798) and Marie Margrethe Flor (1744-1817). After childhood in Trondheim, Berg grew up in Christiania (now Oslo) where he attended Oslo Cathedral School. He later studied at the University of Copenhagen. He was employed at the Royal Library and was a teacher in geography at the Copenhagen Cathedral School. In 1803 he took a Danish legal exam, got married and settled at Gulli in Sem, Norway.

In 1814, he was appointed as a judge at Akershus. At the parliament session of 1814, he represented Jarlsberg (now Vestfold). He was also chairman of the committee which was set up in November 1814 to amend the Constitution of Norway. In 1816 he went to Copenhagen as a commissioner to negotiate the separation of Norway from Denmark. From 1828 to 1835, he was a member of the commission which was preparing new criminal code of law. He also sat on the Christiania city council 1837–46.

== Family ==
He married two times, first in 1803 with Hedevig Marie Elisabet Wessel (1773-1816), second in 1817 with Juliane Marie Haxthausen (dead 1847). He had a son, Fredrik August Berg (1809-1895). He died in Christiania on 4 June 1852.

== Honors ==
Berg was a made a knight of the Order of the Polar Star in 1816 and was appointed commander of the Order of St. Olav in 1847.
