= Inger Lise Gjørv =

Norwegian politician

Inger Lise Gjørv (26 May 1938 – 28 March 2009) was a Norwegian politician for the Labour Party.

== Career ==
She was born in Oslo as the daughter of physician Sverre Strand (1906–1992) and housewife Liv Alnæs (1912–2005). She enrolled as a student in 1957, and graduated with the cand.mag. degree in 1962 from the University of Oslo. She also met her husband, Ole Andreas Gjørv, there, and they moved to Sandvollan Municipality. From 1963 to 1977 she worked as a high school teacher in Steinkjer. On the local level she was a member of the executive committee of the municipal council of Inderøy Municipality from 1975 to 1979. She chaired the local party chapter from 1973 to 1978.

She was elected to the Norwegian Parliament from Nord-Trøndelag in 1977, and was re-elected on three occasions. During her last term, from 1989 to 1993, she was the President of the Odelsting. She was a member of several Standing Committees during her sixteen years in Parliament.

From 1989 to 1993 she was also the vice president of the Council of Europe. She was a member of the now-defunct Statens Naturvernråd from 1973 to 1990, was a member of the board of Concerts Norway from 1974 to 1977, and chaired the board from 1993 to 1998. In 1994 she became a member of the National Committee for Medical and Health Research Ethics and a member of the board of the Norwegian Cancer Society. From 1999 to 2005 she was a member of the NTNU Museum of Natural History and Archaeology.

With her husband, Inger Lise Gjørv restored the ancient farm Gjørv Gård, from a state of virtual ruin to a historic tourist attraction, which was awarded "Olavsrosen" for good restoration practice. For a number of years, they entertained groups in the agritourism business.

In 1991 she was appointed as the new County Governor of Nord-Trøndelag. She was the first woman in Norway to hold the County Governor office. She took office when leaving Parliament, and retired in 2008. Her replacement was acting County Governor Oddbjørn Nordset. Gjørv suffered from cancer for twenty years, and died in March 2009 at the St. Olavs Hospital.

Civic offices
Preceded by Oddbjørn Nordset (acting)	County Governor of Nord-Trøndelag; 1993–2008	Succeeded by Oddbjørn Nordset (acting)
