= Halvor Bachke Guldahl =

Norwegian jurist and businessman

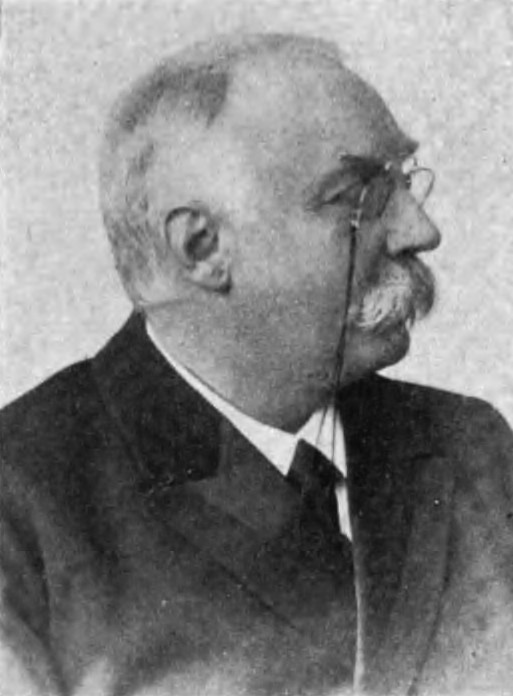
Halvor Bache Guldahl

Halvor Bache Guldahl (18 March 1859 – 10 October 1931) was a Norwegian jurist, businessman, and County Governor of Nordre Trondheim.

He was born in the village of Beitstad in Nordre Trondheim county, Norway. After graduating in law, he worked at Inderøy District Court. He then started as a solicitor in Steinkjer. He was co-founder of Innherreds Kreditbank in 1887, and was the first bank director. From 1894 to 1902, he managed Ogndalsbruket, an operating company for forestry and related resources in the municipality.

Guldahl was acting county governor from 1898 to 1902, while Ole Anton Qvam was member of Parliament and later government minister. He was appointed county governor again in 1916, and sat until 1927. As county governor, he was one of the leading initiatives to found the county-owned power company Nord-Trøndelag Elektrisitetsverk and the bus company Fylkesbilene i Nord-Trøndelag. He was Fylkesbilene's first chair.

He died in October 1931 in Oslo. His will left large assets, including a collection of paintings, to Nord-Trøndelag County Municipality.

Civic offices
Preceded by Ole Anton Qvam	County Governor of Nordre Trondhjem; 1898–1902	Succeeded by Torvald Løchen
Preceded by Torvald Løchen	County Governor of Nordre Trondhjem (County renamed Nord-Trøndelag in 1919); 1916–1927	Succeeded by Haakon Martin Five
