= Trampe =

- Nobility
- Country: Holy Roman Empire; Denmark; Norway
- Current region: Pomerania
- Origin: East Elbia
- Titles: Imperial Count; Count of Trampe

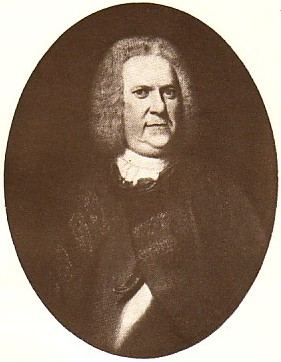
Count Philip Ditlev von Trampe

The Trampe family (German: v. Trampe, Danish: af Trampe, Norwegian: av Trampe) is an ancient noble family of German origin. The family became Imperial Counts (Reichsgraf) of the Holy Roman Empire in 1736 and Counts of Denmark and Norway in 1743.

== History ==
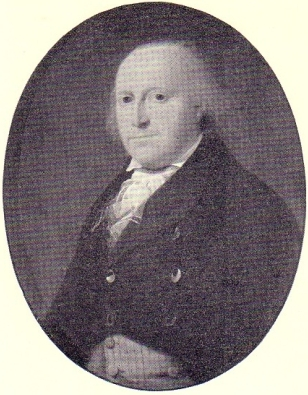
Count Adam Frederik Trampe

A branch of the family moved from East Elbia to Pomerania by the 13th century and from Pomerania, the family immigrated to the Nordic countries. The family came to Denmark with Lieutenant General Adam Frederik Trampe (1650-1704).

Frederich Christopher Trampe (1779–1832) moved to Norway in 1810 as County Governor of Søndre Trondhjems amt (now Sør-Trøndelag). His father Adam Frederik Trampe (1750-1807) was a Danish military officer and landowner.

== Literature ==
- Genealogisches Handbuch des Adels, Gräfliche Häuser A IV, C.A Starke Verlag 1962
