= Trøndelag County Municipality =

Trøndelag County Municipality Trøndelag fylkeskommune Trööndelagen fylhkentjïelte
- County
- Coat of arms

- Location in Norway
- Coordinates: 64.0148°N 11.4954°E
- Country: Norway
- Administrative center: Steinkjer

Government
  - County mayor: Tomas Iver Hallem
- ISO 3166 code: NO-50
- Revenue: 4,300 million kr
- Employees: 4,300
- Schools: 32
- Pupils: 17,000
- Website: trondelagfylke.no

Trøndelag County Municipality (Norwegian: Trøndelag fylkeskommune or Southern Sami: Trööndelagen fylhkentjïelte) is the democratically elected regional governing administration of Trøndelag county in Norway. The main responsibilities of the county municipality includes the running of 36 upper secondary schools, with 17,000 pupils. It administers thousands of kilometers of county roadways, public transport, dental care, culture, and cultural heritage.

== County government ==
The county municipality's most important tasks include secondary education, recreation (sports and outdoor life), and cultural heritage. The county municipality is also responsible for all county roads (including ferry operations) and public transport (including school busses). The county municipality has further responsibility for regional land-use planning, business development, power production, and environmental management. The county also has responsibility for providing dental health services (in 2002, responsibility for hospitals and public medicine was transferred from the counties to the new regional health authorities).

=== County council ===
The county council (Norwegian: Fylkestinget) is made up of 59 representatives that are elected by direct election by all legal residents of the county every fourth year. The council is the legislative body for the county. The county council typically meets about six times a year. Council members are divided into standing committees and an executive committee (fylkesutvalg), which meet considerably more often. Both the council and executive committee (with at least 5 members) are led by the county mayor (Norwegian: fylkesordfører). The executive committee carries out the executive funitons of the county under the direction of the whole council. The tables below show the current and historical composition of the council by political party.

Trøndelag fylkesting 2023–2027
Party name (in Norwegian)	Number of representatives
Labour Party (Arbeiderpartiet)	16
Progress Party (Fremskrittspartiet)	4
Green Party (Miljøpartiet De Grønne)	3
Conservative Party (Høyre)	14
Industry and Business Party (Industri‑ og Næringspartiet)	2
Christian Democratic Party (Kristelig Folkeparti)	2
Pensioners' Party (Pensjonistpartiet)	2
Red Party (Rødt)	2
Centre Party (Senterpartiet)	7
Socialist Left Party (Sosialistisk Venstreparti)	5
Liberal Party (Venstre)	2
Total number of members:	59

Trøndelag fylkesting 2019–2023
Party name (in Norwegian)	Number of representatives
Labour Party (Arbeiderpartiet)	18
Progress Party (Fremskrittspartiet)	3
Green Party (Miljøpartiet De Grønne)	4
Conservative Party (Høyre)	9
Christian Democratic Party (Kristelig Folkeparti)	1
Pensioners' Party (Pensjonistpartiet)	2
Red Party (Rødt)	3
Centre Party (Senterpartiet)	13
Socialist Left Party (Sosialistisk Venstreparti)	4
Liberal Party (Venstre)	2
Total number of members:	59
Note: Trøndelag County Council Composition

Trøndelag fylkesting 2018–2019
Party name (in Norwegian)	Number of representatives
Labour Party (Arbeiderpartiet)	31
Progress Party (Fremskrittspartiet)	5
Green Party (Miljøpartiet De Grønne)	4
Conservative Party (Høyre)	12
Christian Democratic Party (Kristelig Folkeparti)	3
Pensioners' Party (Pensjonistpartiet)	1
Red Party (Rødt)	1
Centre Party (Senterpartiet)	14
Socialist Left Party (Sosialistisk Venstreparti)	4
Liberal Party (Venstre)	3
Total number of members:	78

=== County mayor ===
The county mayor (Norwegian: fylkesordfører) of Trøndelag has been the political leader of the county and the chairperson of the county council. Here is a list of people who have held this position:

- 2018–2023: Tore O. Sandvik (Ap)
- 2023–present: Tomas Iver Hallem (Sp)

== Transport ==
Public transport in the county are operated on public service obligation contracts from the county municipality via the transportation authority company AtB AS (meaning A to B), and operations are performed by Boreal Buss, Nettbuss, Tide Buss and TrønderBilene (buses), Boreal Bane (tram), and Fosen Trafikklag and Kystekspressen (passenger ferries). County road are operated by the Norwegian Public Roads Administration, though managed by the county municipality.

== Schools ==
The county operates 32 upper secondary schools in the county.

- Byåsen Upper Secondary School, Trondheim
- Charlottenlund Upper Secondary School, Trondheim
- Fosen Upper Secondary School
- Gauldal Upper Secondary School
- Grong Upper Secondary School
- Heimdal Upper Secondary School, Trondheim
- Hemne Upper Secondary School
- Hitra Upper Secondary School
- Inderøy Upper Secondary School
- Leksvik Upper Secondary School
- Levanger Upper Secondary School
- Malvik Upper Secondary School
- Meldal Upper Secondary School
- Melhus Upper Secondary School
- Meråker Upper Secondary School
- Mære Agriculture School
- Olav Duun Upper Secondary School
- Ole Vig Upper Secondary School
- Oppdal Upper Secondary School
- Orkdal Upper Secondary School
- Rissa Upper Secondary School
- Røros Upper Secondary School
- Selbu Upper Secondary School
- Skjetlein Upper Secondary School, Trondheim
- Steinkjer Upper Secondary School
- Strinda Upper Secondary School, Trondheim
- Thora Storm Upper Secondary School
- Tiller Upper Secondary School, Trondheim
- Trondheim Cathedral School
- Verdal Upper Secondary School
- Ytre Namdal Upper Secondary School
- Åfjord Upper Secondary School
