= Sør-Trøndelag County Municipality =

Sør-Trøndelag County Municipality Sør-Trøndelag fylkeskommune
- County
- Coat of arms

- Location in Norway
- Country: Norway
- Administrative center: Trondheim

Government
  - County mayor: Tore O. Sandvik
- ISO 3166 code: NO-16
- Revenue: NOK 2,500 million
- Employees: 2,600
- Schools: 24
- Pupils: 10,000
- Transit authority: None

Sør-Trøndelag County Municipality (Norwegian: Sør-Trøndelag fylkeskommune) was the regional governing administration of the old Sør-Trøndelag county in Norway until 1 January 2018 when it merged with Nord-Trøndelag county to form the new Trøndelag county.

== County government ==
The county municipality's most important tasks include secondary education, recreation (sports and outdoor life), and cultural heritage. The county municipality is also responsible for all county roads (including ferry operations) and public transport (including school busses). The county municipality has further responsibility for regional land-use planning, business development, power production, and environmental management. The county also has responsibility for providing dental health services (in 2002, responsibility for hospitals and public medicine was transferred from the counties to the new regional health authorities).

=== County mayor ===
Since 1963, the county mayor (Norwegian: fylkesordfører) of Sør-Trøndelag county has been the political leader of the county and the chairperson of the county council. Prior to 1963, the County governor led the council which was made up of all of the mayors of the rural municipalities within the county.

Here is a list of people who have held this position:

- 1963–1963: Einar Moxnes (Sp)
- 1964–1967: Ole Kjønsvik (Ap)
- 1968–1971: Alf Nebb (Sp)
- 1972–1975: Sverre Pettersen (Ap)
- 1976–1979: Kristoffer Rein (KrF)
- 1980–1991: Ivar Ytreland (H)
- 1992–2003: Arnt Frøseth (Sp)
- 2003–2017: Tore O. Sandvik (Ap)

=== County council ===
The county council (Norwegian: Fylkestinget) is made up of 37 representatives that are elected by direct election by all legal residents of the county every fourth year. The council is the legislative body for the county. The county council typically meets about six times a year. Council members are divided into standing committees and an executive committee (fylkesutvalg), which meet considerably more often. Both the council and executive committee (with at least 5 members) are led by the county mayor (Norwegian: fylkesordfører). The executive committee carries out the executive funitons of the county under the direction of the whole council. The tables below show the current and historical composition of the council by political party.

Sør-Trøndelag fylkesting 2016–2017
Party name (in Norwegian)	Number of representatives
Labour Party (Arbeiderpartiet)	18
Progress Party (Fremskrittspartiet)	3
Green Party (Miljøpartiet De Grønne)	3
Conservative Party (Høyre)	8
Christian Democratic Party (Kristelig Folkeparti)	2
Pensioners' Party (Pensjonistpartiet)	1
Red Party (Rødt)	1
Centre Party (Senterpartiet)	3
Socialist Left Party (Sosialistisk Venstreparti)	2
Liberal Party (Venstre)	2
Total number of members:	43

Sør-Trøndelag fylkesting 2012–2015
Party name (in Norwegian)	Number of representatives
Labour Party (Arbeiderpartiet)	16
Progress Party (Fremskrittspartiet)	3
Conservative Party (Høyre)	9
Christian Democratic Party (Kristelig Folkeparti)	1
Red Party (Rødt)	1
Centre Party (Senterpartiet)	3
Socialist Left Party (Sosialistisk Venstreparti)	2
Liberal Party (Venstre)	2
Total number of members:	37

Sør-Trøndelag fylkesting 2008–2011
Party name (in Norwegian)	Number of representatives
Labour Party (Arbeiderpartiet)	16
Progress Party (Fremskrittspartiet)	6
Conservative Party (Høyre)	5
Christian Democratic Party (Kristelig Folkeparti)	2
Red Party (Rødt)	1
Centre Party (Senterpartiet)	3
Socialist Left Party (Sosialistisk Venstreparti)	3
Liberal Party (Venstre)	1
Total number of members:	37

Sør-Trøndelag fylkesting 2004–2007
Party name (in Norwegian)	Number of representatives
Labour Party (Arbeiderpartiet)	12
Progress Party (Fremskrittspartiet)	4
Conservative Party (Høyre)	6
Christian Democratic Party (Kristelig Folkeparti)	2
Pensioners' Party (Pensjonistpartiet)	1
Red Electoral Alliance (Rød Valgallianse)	1
Centre Party (Senterpartiet)	4
Socialist Left Party (Sosialistisk Venstreparti)	6
Liberal Party (Venstre)	1
Total number of members:	37

Sør-Trøndelag fylkesting 2000–2003
Party name (in Norwegian)	Number of representatives
Labour Party (Arbeiderpartiet)	17
Progress Party (Fremskrittspartiet)	4
Conservative Party (Høyre)	12
Christian Democratic Party (Kristelig Folkeparti)	4
Pensioners' Party (Pensjonistpartiet)	1
Red Electoral Alliance (Rød Valgallianse)	2
Centre Party (Senterpartiet)	6
Socialist Left Party (Sosialistisk Venstreparti)	5
Liberal Party (Venstre)	2
Total number of members:	53

Sør-Trøndelag fylkesting 1996–1999
Party name (in Norwegian)	Number of representatives
Labour Party (Arbeiderpartiet)	17
Progress Party (Fremskrittspartiet)	4
Conservative Party (Høyre)	13
Christian Democratic Party (Kristelig Folkeparti)	3
Pensioners' Party (Pensjonistpartiet)	1
Red Electoral Alliance (Rød Valgallianse)	1
Centre Party (Senterpartiet)	8
Socialist Left Party (Sosialistisk Venstreparti)	4
Liberal Party (Venstre)	2
Total number of members:	53

Sør-Trøndelag fylkesting 1992–1995
Party name (in Norwegian)	Number of representatives
Labour Party (Arbeiderpartiet)	16
Progress Party (Fremskrittspartiet)	3
Conservative Party (Høyre)	12
Christian Democratic Party (Kristelig Folkeparti)	4
Red Electoral Alliance (Rød Valgallianse)	1
Centre Party (Senterpartiet)	8
Socialist Left Party (Sosialistisk Venstreparti)	7
Liberal Party (Venstre)	2
Total number of members:	53

Sør-Trøndelag fylkesting 1988–1991
Party name (in Norwegian)	Number of representatives
Labour Party (Arbeiderpartiet)	28
Progress Party (Fremskrittspartiet)	7
Conservative Party (Høyre)	15
Christian Democratic Party (Kristelig Folkeparti)	5
Red Electoral Alliance (Rød Valgallianse)	1
Centre Party (Senterpartiet)	6
Socialist Left Party (Sosialistisk Venstreparti)	5
Liberal Party (Venstre)	4
Total number of members:	71

Sør-Trøndelag fylkesting 1984–1987
Party name (in Norwegian)	Number of representatives
Labour Party (Arbeiderpartiet)	29
Progress Party (Fremskrittspartiet)	3
Conservative Party (Høyre)	18
Christian Democratic Party (Kristelig Folkeparti)	5
Red Electoral Alliance (Rød Valgallianse)	1
Centre Party (Senterpartiet)	7
Socialist Left Party (Sosialistisk Venstreparti)	5
Liberal Party (Venstre)	3
Total number of members:	71

Sør-Trøndelag fylkesting 1980–1983
Party name (in Norwegian)	Number of representatives
Labour Party (Arbeiderpartiet)	28
Progress Party (Fremskrittspartiet)	1
Conservative Party (Høyre)	18
Christian Democratic Party (Kristelig Folkeparti)	6
Liberal People's Party (Liberale Folkepartiet)	1
Red Electoral Alliance (Rød Valgallianse)	1
Centre Party (Senterpartiet)	8
Socialist Left Party (Sosialistisk Venstreparti)	4
Liberal Party (Venstre)	4
Total number of members:	71

Sør-Trøndelag fylkesting 1976–1979
Party name (in Norwegian)	Number of representatives
Labour Party (Arbeiderpartiet)	28
Conservative Party (Høyre)	14
Christian Democratic Party (Kristelig Folkeparti)	8
New People's Party (Nye Folkepartiet)	2
Centre Party (Senterpartiet)	11
Socialist Left Party (Sosialistisk Venstreparti)	5
Liberal Party (Venstre)	3
Total number of members:	71

== Transport ==
Public transport in the county was operated on public service obligation contracts from the county municipality via the transportation authority company AtB AS (lit. 'A to B'), and operations were performed by Boreal Buss, Nettbuss, Tide Buss, and TrønderBilene (buses), Boreal Bane (tram), and Fosen Trafikklag and Kystekspressen (passenger ferries). County road were operated by the Norwegian Public Roads Administration, though managed by the county municipality.

== Schools ==
- Adolf Øiens School, Trondheim
- Brundalen Upper Secondary School, Trondheim
- Byåsen Upper Secondary School, Trondheim
- Fosen Upper Secondary School, Bjugn
- Gauldal Upper Secondary School, Støren
- Gerhard Schønings School, Trondheim
- Heimdal Upper Secondary School, Trondheim
- Hemne Upper Secondary School, Kyrksæterøra
- Hitra Upper Secondary School, Fillan
- Ladejarlen Upper Secondary School, Trondheim
- Malvik Upper Secondary School, Vikhammer
- Meldal Upper Secondary School, Løkken Verk
- Melhus Upper Secondary School, Melhus
- Oppdal Upper Secondary School, Oppdal
- Orkdal Upper Secondary School, Orkanger
- Ringve Upper Secondary School, Trondheim
- Rissa Upper Secondary School, Årnset
- Røros Upper Secondary School, Røros
- Selbu Upper Secondary School, Mebonden
- Skjetlein Upper Secondary School, Trondheim
- Strinda Upper Secondary School, Trondheim
- Tiller Upper Secondary School, Trondheim
- Trondheim Cathedral School, Trondheim
- Åfjord Upper Secondary School, Å i Åfjord
