= Bjørn Arild Gram =

Norwegian politician (born 1972)

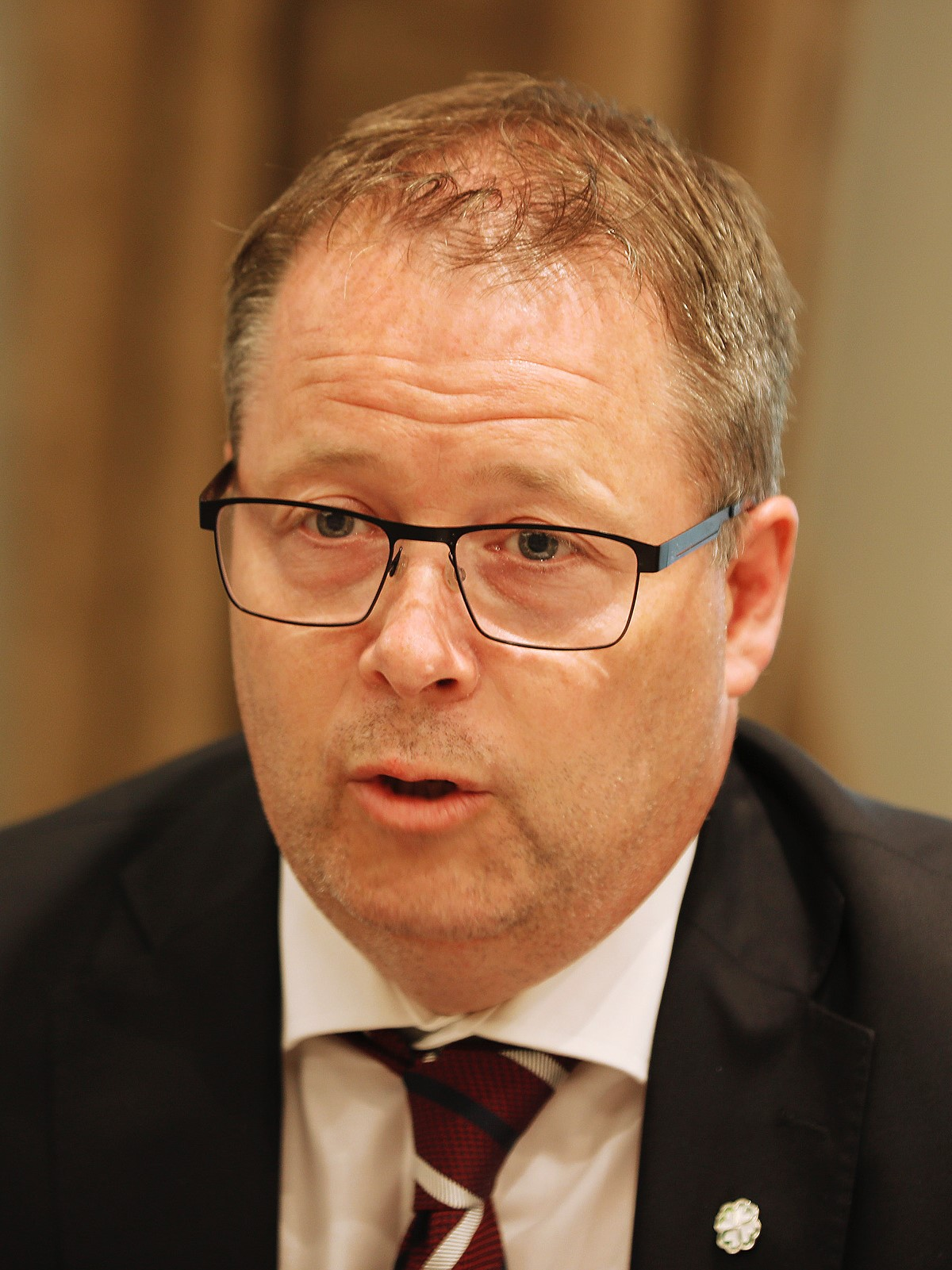
- Gram in 2022

Member of the Storting
- Incumbent
- Assumed office 1 October 2025
- Constituency: Nord-Trøndelag

First Deputy Leader of the Centre Party
- Incumbent
- Assumed office 29 March 2025
- Leader: Trygve Slagsvold Vedum
- Preceded by: Ola Borten Moe

Minister of Defence
- In office 12 April 2022 – 4 February 2025
- Prime Minister: Jonas Gahr Støre
- Preceded by: Odd Roger Enoksen
- Succeeded by: Tore O. Sandvik

Minister of Local Government
- In office 14 October 2021 – 12 April 2022
- Prime Minister: Jonas Gahr Støre
- Preceded by: Nikolai Astrup
- Succeeded by: Sigbjørn Gjelsvik

Chair of the Norwegian Association of Local and Regional Authorities
- In office 12 February 2020 – 14 October 2021
- Preceded by: Gunn Marit Helgesen
- Succeeded by: Gunn Marit Helgesen

Mayor of Steinkjer Municipality
- In office 3 October 2007 – 16 March 2020
- Deputy: Aud Gaundal; May Britt Lagesen; Grete Bækken Mollan; Ida Bruheim Derås; Øyvind Geving Bjørnes
- Preceded by: Per Sverre Rannem
- Succeeded by: Anne Berit Lein

Personal details
- Born: 7 May 1972 (age 53) Steinkjer, Nord-Trøndelag, Norway
- Party: Centre
- Education: Nord-Trøndelag University College; Bodø University College

Military service
- Branch/service: Home Guard

Bjørn Arild Gram (born 7 May 1972 in Steinkjer) is a Norwegian politician who has served as the first deputy leader of the Centre Party since 2025 and previously the minister of defence from 2022 to 2025. A member of the Centre Party, he also previously served as the minister of local government from 2021 to 2022. After the 2025 election, he was elected to the Storting after being a deputy member in previous periods (1993-1997, 2001-2009, 2013–2021).

Gram started his as the leader of the Centre Youth and logos politics before his election as a deputy representative to the Storting from Nord-Trøndelag, and went on to serve in said position on two more occasions. He served as a state secretary in the Ministry of Finance from 2005 to 2007, when he became mayor of Steinkjer. He stepped down as mayor in 2020 when he was appointed chair of the Norwegian Association of Local and Regional Authorities, a position he held until his ministerial appointment in 2021.

== Education ==
He studied at Nord-Trøndelag University College from 1991 to 1997 and took the siv.øk. degree at Bodø University College in 2000. He was employed in Telenor Mobil from 2000 to 2005.

He also attended the recruit school in Steinkjer Municipality, and later became troop leader and was stationed along the Russian border. He was also a sergeant in the Norwegian Home Guard.

== Political career ==
=== Youth and local politics ===
From 1996 to 1998 he chaired the Centre Youth, the youth wing of the Centre Party. On the local level Gram served as the mayor of Steinkjer Municipality from 2007 to 2020, having formerly been a member of the county council from 1991 to 2000. He was a member of Nord-Trøndelag county council from 1995 to 2019, and has chaired the county party chapter.

In 2016, during his time as mayor, Gram was among ten participants at a cabin in Sweden when a text message saying "We want your pussy" was sent to former party leader Liv Signe Navarsete. Like the nine other participants, he denied having sent the message.

In February 2020, he was appointed the new chair of the Norwegian Association of Local and Regional Authorities, and stepped down as mayor the next month.

=== Party politics ===
He was elected first deputy leader of the Centre Party at the 2025 convention, succeeding Ola Borten Moe.

=== Parliament ===
He served as a deputy representative to the Storting from Nord-Trøndelag from 1993–1997, 2001–2009 and 2013–2021. From 2005 to 2007 Gram was a member of Stoltenberg's Second Cabinet as State Secretary in the Ministry of Finance. In 2013, as Marit Arnstad from Nord-Trøndelag was a member of the outgoing Stoltenberg's Second Cabinet, Gram met as a regular representative during the two weeks before the cabinet change.

He was elected as a regular representative from Nord-Trøndelag at the 2025 election. He also joined the Standing Committee on Finance and Economic Affairs, additionally becoming the committee's second vice chair.

=== Minister of Local Government ===
Gram was appointed minister of local government in Jonas Gahr Støre's cabinet on 14 October 2021.

==== 2021 ====
Gram told NRK that he would facilitate so that local democracy can take a position on the future of its county. He further said it would take a decision from the Storting to reverse county mergers. He didn't give an estimate to what reversal of the mergers would cost, but emphasised that the government would have dialog with the counties in question about what would be necessary to go through with the process of reversal.

Following questions from members of the Storting regarding Telenor continuing construction of the 5G network with Huawei equipment in Bergen, Gram answered with a written statement that seemed similar to former Minister of Districts and Digitalisation Linda Hofstad Helleland's response about the same case a few weeks earlier. Gram later revealed that the similar answers are due to the fact that the authorities' policy is fixed, even after the change of government.

On 29 October, Gram issued a letter where he and the government approved the dissolution of Troms og Finnmark county.

After the government approved for municipalities who were merged by force, to dissolve themselves, Gram expressed that he had faith in local democracy and confidence in the municipalities to listen to there inhabitants in an appropriate way. He further stated that he didn't want to speculate in local outcomes against forced mergers.

On 13 December, in a Storting question time, Liberal Party representative André N. Skjelstad asked Gram about which tasks would be transferred from the county governor to the county municipality. Gram didn't answer the question directly, but stated that the government would get back to the Storting with a proposal of which tasks should be transferred. He also emphasized that for many years there had been a sneak centralisation of government jobs and this must be taken into account.

In a press release on 19 December, Gram announced that the housing benefits would rise through January to March 2022. He also stressed that people should apply to get the benefits by 31 December, and those who already had it didn't have to apply again for the given period.

==== 2022 ====
In early January 2022, the government announced that small houses will still be built with chimneys, in effect meaning that they would not go in to remove the requirement for single-family homes to have a chimney in accordance with building regulations. Gram stressed the importance of chimneys, stating: "It is important that people can keep warm if there is a natural disaster or other major event. By keeping the requirement for a chimney, we make it easier for more people to burn firewood".

Gram stated that he could not promise municipalities who wants to change counties after mergers where reversed the right to do so. He stressed the factors of changes to the county those municipalities would leave and the ones they would be entering, in addition to constituency changes for the Storting. He added that the decision would be left to the Storting.

In March, Gram sent a proposal for an amendment to the Inheritance Act to the Storting that would ensure that family members of the recently deceased would be able to file paperwork digitally and make said process shorter and "less bureaucratic". In his statement, he said: "Today, the process after death is complicated and paper-based. We are now working on a digital death estate solution that will solve some of the bureaucratic tangles. But for it to be legal to share data digitally via a digital death estate solution, the Inheritance Act must be changed".

In April, Gram announced that notable changes to the electoral law would be made, that previously were exclusively made for the 2021 election during the COVID-19 pandemic; could be permanently implemented. Further changes included for early votes to be counted as soon as the first Sunday before Election Day, and for local electrical commissions to establish other voting locations within their respective constituencies. The Ministry plans to follow up on these changes recommended by a commission set down, to propose an amendment to the electoral law to be put forward in early 2023.

=== Minister of Defence ===
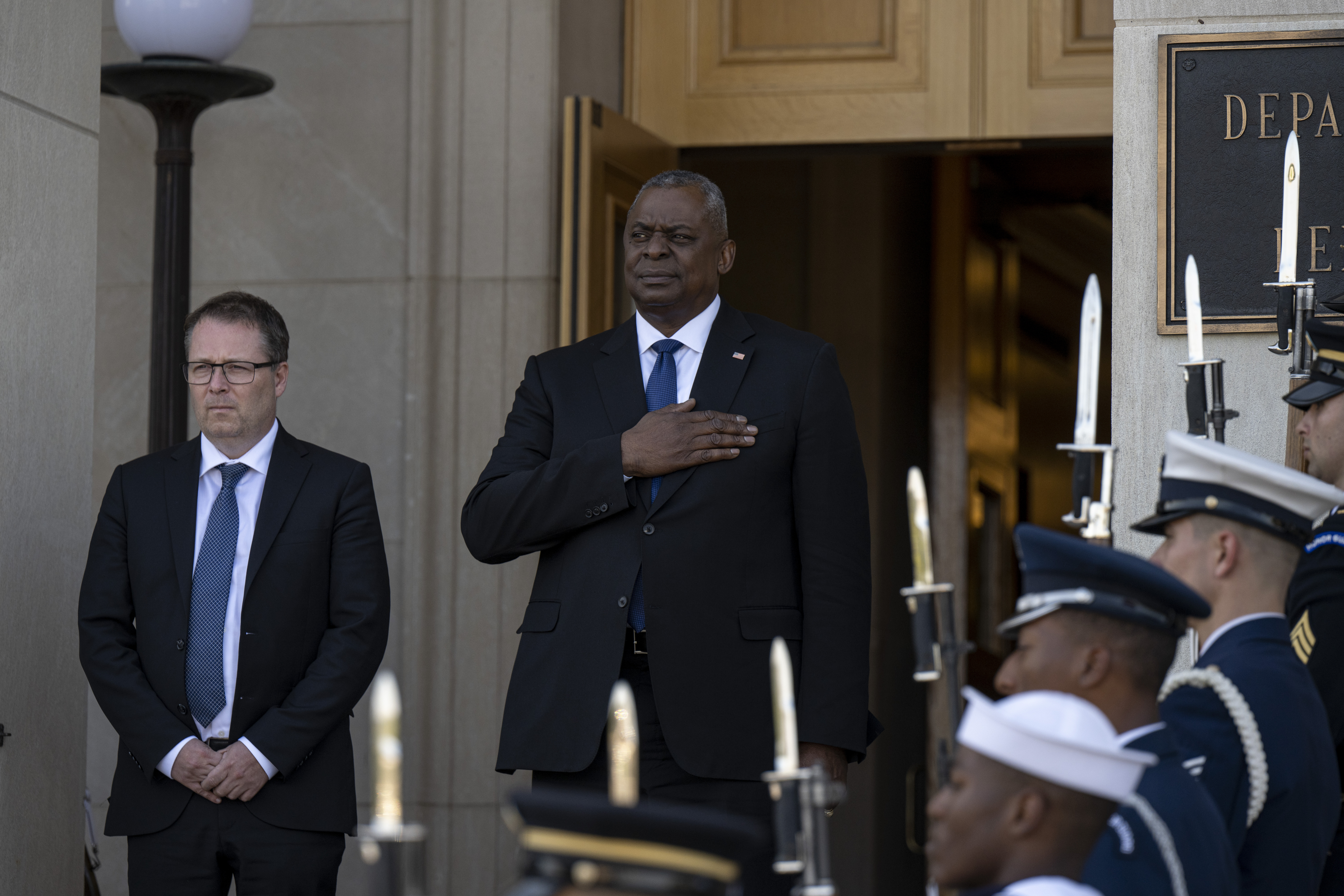
Gram with U.S. Secretary of Defense Lloyd Austin on 20 September 2022

After Odd Roger Enoksen resigned in the wake of revelations of multiple inappropriate sexual relations with younger women, Gram was appointed his successor on 12 April 2022. During the minor reshuffle, Sigbjørn Gjelsvik was appointed his successor as minister of local government.

==== 2022 ====
On 20 April, Gram announced that Norway would be donating air defence system missiles to Ukraine, while the missiles were being phased out in the Norwegian Army. He stated: "The missile will be phased out by the Norwegian Armed Forces, but it is still a modern and effective weapon that will be of great benefit to Ukraine. Other countries have also donated similar weapon systems".

Gram visited Pasvik in Sør-Varanger Municipality with his Nordic counterparts on 11 May to discuss their countries' continued cooperation. At their press meet, Gram started by saying: "We are at a crossroads in Nordic history. We know that Sweden and Finland are in the final stages of applying for NATO membership. We are looking at the importance of developing the Nordic defence work in the future".

On 23 May, Dagbladet revealed that Gram had received double salary when he concurrently was mayor of Steinkjer and a deputy member of Parliament in 2018 and 2019. Gram clarified that he had repaid Steinkjer municipality, in order to remove any doubt about his integrity.

On 8 June, Gram announced that Norway would be donating 22 artillery weapons of the type M109 howitzer to Ukraine, stating: "The Ukrainian forces depend on Western support in the form of military equipment and weapons to withstand the Russian attacks. Ukraine has requested this type of arms support. The development of the war in Ukraine indicates that it is now necessary to donate heavier materiel and weapons systems as well".

At a defence minister summit in Brussels on 16 June, Gram said he wouldn't rule out that Ukrainian soldiers could be trained in Norway, despite having previously ruled it out.

After Sweden and Finland signed an agreement with Turkey, thereby clearing their way to join NATO, Russia made threats against the former. Gram asserted that there would be no heighten risks with the two's accession into NATO. He noted that the countries would bring new defence capabilities and that the Nordics weren't a threat against anyone and blamed Vladimir Putin's actions as the cause for their accession.

On 7 July, the government announced that they would be establishing a new action plan for military veterans. The plan is cross-sectoral and will focus on follow-up, care and recognition of veterans and their families, before, during and after service in international operations. Gram emphasised the importance of following up veterans and their families, and how some soldiers have experience negative consequences due to their service. He stated: "We know that recognition is important to limit the negative consequences, and it is a great responsibility that we as a society have to show those who have taken risks on our behalf that we appreciate the efforts. The government will also study measures that will make it easier for society to utilize the veterans' unique competence and experience". He also praised municipalities who have initiated veteran plans and the Norwegian Army's efforts to assist them. He also said that he looked forward to working with veteran interest organisations.

On 29 July, Gram announced that Norway would be donating 14 Iveco LMV armored patrol vehicles. The vehicles would be donated in addition to artillery weapons, portable air defence and armor servers. He stated: "Norway continues to contribute to the Ukrainians' fight for freedom. The government is constantly assessing how Norway can provide further support to Ukraine in the country's defence against Russia's invasion".

At a meeting with his Swedish and Danish counterparts in Malmö on 9 August, Gram stated that the Nordic countries would work more together with notably Nordic Response, and expressed that the Nordics should be able to handle threats from Russia. He also expressed concern regarding their rapid change of rhetoric.

At a donor conference for Ukraine held in Copenhagen on 11 August, Gram pledged that Norway would be sending instructors to the United Kingdom to assist training Ukrainian soldiers. Two days afterwards, the Russian embassy in Norway stated that they took it as "another unfriendly step" against them, saying: "We consider this decision to be another unfriendly step by the Norwegian authorities, on par with the country's latest actions directed at Russia - a neighboring country that has never threatened Norway, its territorial integrity or people".

On 8 September, while visiting the U. S Ramstein Air Base in Germany for a summit with 50 of his international counterparts, Gram announced that Norway would be donating Hellfire missiles to Ukraine. When asked about Ukrainian soldiers being trained in Norway, Gram refused to comment, citing security considerations.

On 15 September, the Red Party expressed concerns about revelations that the government had been open to the possibility of the Norwegian Intelligence Service imposing telecommunications and network companies to give them copies of data communications that reach outside the Norwegian border. To NRK, Gram said that Norway isn't capable enough to defend itself against espionage, sabotage, terrorism planning and cyber operations. He also asserted that it was important for defence purposes for a system like the one revealed, to be in place.

A day after the Auditor General of Norway Karl Eirik Schjøtt-Pedersen presented a report into the Norwegian Army's information system, Gram released a statement in response, stating: "The findings of the National Audit Office are very serious. We share the National Audit Office's understanding of reality, and what the National Audit Office has pointed out matches our own findings. It is nevertheless the case that the Armed Forces and the defence sector resolve the day-to-day tasks. The National Audit Office also points this out".

At a press conference on 20 October, alongside prime minister Jonas Gahr Støre and justice minister Emilie Enger Mehl; Gram assured that the Norwegian Army had put in measures as soon as in December 2021 to strengthen itself. He further informed that the Norwegian Intelligence Service had received more supplies, and that the skies and territorial waters were being heavily patrolled. He also sympathised with concerns about the situation in Europe, and added that "we won't be scared".

On 2 November, Gram expressed that Swedish and Finnish NATO membership would change Norway's role in the organisation, which would include new investment necessities. He was also open to Norway and Iceland joining the Joint Force Command Norfolk and the necessity of expanding its headquarters.

On 10 November, Gram expressed that the command structure of the Norwegian Army should be changed, while also admitting that the army was struggling with management. This sentiment was shared by Chief of Defence Eirik Kristoffersen. Gram notably suggested a change where the Norwegian Defence Estates Agency should work directly for the army rather than for the Ministry of Defence. The same day, he announced that Norway would be donating 1,5 NOK to the British-led International Fund for Ukraine, which will help Ukraine buy more weapons and equipment. According to Gram, this would make Norway the second largest donor for the fund besides the United Kingdom.

==== 2023 ====
On 4 January 2023, Gram announced that Norway would be donating 10 000 modern long-range artillery shells from the country's own arsenal, to Ukraine.

In late January, Gram announced that Norway would be donating Leopard 2 tanks to Ukraine. The number of tanks were announced at a later time, with it being a total of eight. It was also concurrently announced that Norwegian soldiers would train Ukrainian soldiers in how to operate the tanks, in addition to two Ukrainian squads receiving four tanks each.

In February, Gram confirmed that NATO had expressed dissatisfaction with the slow build up of BNP that Norway had been spending on the Norwegian Army, which is currently at 1,43 percent out of 2 by NATO standard. Gram also confirmed that Norway doesn't expect to reach the target until 2026.

Following NRK revelations of sexual harassment against women in Army conscript training, Gram called a meeting with army officials, including the Chief of Defence Eirik Kristoffersen, representatives of conscripts and the army's women network. The meeting led to the army laying out new measures to ensure that notifications of sexual harassment and similar, will be reported to central level of the army. The measures will came into force on 1 August. Gram called for collective responsibility to ensure a better environment for conscripts.

In March, Gram and Norwegian Chief of Defence Eirik Kristoffersen visited Kyiv. Gram also announced that Norway, in cooperation with the United States, would donate NASAMS ground based air defence systems to Ukraine. Gram also met with his Ukrainian counterpart and the deputy defence minister.

Following the announcement of Finland's entry into NATO following ratification by all member states, Gram expressed little surprise about Russia's response. He also stated that both Norway and the rest of NATO would be monitoring Russian activity closely and reiterated that both Sweden and Finland's entrance into the alliance was due to the Russian invasion of Ukraine.

On 3 May, Gram received the report and findings of the Defence Commission led by former justice minister Knut Storberget. Their findings notably recommended that there should be an immediate budget boost of NOK 30 billion in defence spending, extraordinary grants over ten years of around NOK 40 billion per year be given and a further budget increase of 10 billion NOK after the period of extra appropriations is over.

On 24 May, Gram informed parliament that Norway will be supporting training of Ukrainian pilots for F-16 fighter jets.

Alongside prime minister Jonas Gahr Støre, Gram announced in July during a visit to Norwegian troops in Lithuania in the lead up to the NATO summit in Vilnius; that their stay would be extended by a year through 2024. At the NATO summit, he also signed a joint statement with Belgium, Denmark, Luxembourg, the United Kingdom, The Netherlands, Portugal, Poland, Sweden and Romania, pledging training of the Ukrainian air force.

In September, Gram admitted that some cases related to weapons manufacturer Nammo should have been treated as insider trading, despite initially denying that such was the case.

In October, Gram signed a letter of intent regarding development of common solutions in air space of NATO countries. The letter of intent would mean that Norway would participate in efforts to see how NATO allies could train over national borders and air space.

In December, he visited London to present new details for a new Maritime Capability Coalition for Ukraine together with his British counterpart, Grant Shapps.

==== 2024 ====
In early February, Gram signed a deal with American ambassador Marc Nathanson which would ensure that the United States an expanded presence of the US Army in a further eight selected areas of Norway. This was an expansion on a previous deal signed which had allowed for four areas.

Gram visited Alta in March where the Nordic Response military exercise between the Nordic countries took place. While there, he revealed that the government's long term defence plan would be presented in the near future, but couldn't confirm if the wishes of 8 billion NOK in spending would be met, as recommended by Chief of Defence Eirik Kristoffersen. Gram also met with his German counterpart, Boris Pistorius, whom he accompanied in meeting soldiers that participated in the exercise. He also signed a joint letter of intent in delivering air defence equipment to Ukraine.

Alongside prime minister Jonas Gahr Støre and finance minister Trygve Slagsvold Vedum, Gram announced in April that the government would be spending 600 billion NOK in the Norwegian Army in the next twelve years as part of their long term plan for the army. The plan would put much more emphasis on conscription, the Navy, Army and Home Guard. He emphasised the need for more personnel in digital technology and expressed that the spending was like a reform and a way for the Army to receive better opportunities to deliver.

Gram visited Japan in early September to sign a new agreement with his Japanese counterpart, Minoru Kihara, on defence industrial supplies between their two countries and to discuss the security situation in the Indo-Pacific region, in addition to the relationship between China and Russia.

Gram and finance minister Trygve Slagsvold Vedum announced in late September that the government would be aiming to increase the state budget spent on the Norwegian Home Guard for 2025, allocating 277 million NOK for this purpose. Parts of the proposed budget for the Home Guard would allow them to increase annual exercises, a move which was notably praised by the Home Guard itself.

Gram and Chief of Defence Eirik Kristoffersen visited Moldova in late October, where the former signed a letter of intent with his Moldovan counterpart Anatolie Nosatîi. During his visit, Gram also met with representatives from the Centre for Strategic Communication and Combating Disinformation.

He announced in December that conscripts to the army who had been rejected due to association to high security risk countries such as China, Iran and Russia, would now have their applications reconsidered. He further demanded that the army go through their routines for conscript recruitment, security clearances and admissions to session. This came after media reports revealed that close to 300 people were rejected by the army to be conscripts with an approach that they weren't informed about.

==== 2025 ====
While visiting the Skjold garrison in early January, Gram announced that the government aims to reach 3% BNP on defence by the early 2030s rather than 2036 as previously estimated. He also expressed expectations for the incoming American government's plans to solve the war in Ukraine.

Following the Centre Party's withdrawel from government, he was succeeded by Tore O. Sandvik on 4 February 2025.

Political offices
Preceded by Per Sverre Rannem	Mayor of Steinkjer Municipality; 2007–2020	Succeeded by Anne Berit Lein
Preceded by Nikolai Astrup	Minister of Local Government; 2021–2022	Succeeded by Sigbjørn Gjelsvik
Preceded by Odd Roger Enoksen	Minister of Defence; 2022–2025	Succeeded by Tore O. Sandvik
Non-profit organization positions
Preceded by Gunn Marit Helgesen	Chair of the Norwegian Association of Local and Regional Authorities; 2020–2021	Succeeded by Gunn Marit Helgesen
