= Eva Heir =

Norwegian politician (1943–2024)

Eva Heir (27 January 1943 – 21 January 2024) was a Norwegian school principal and politician for the Socialist Left Party.

Hailing from Nesna, she finished her secondary education at Orkdal landsgymnas before attending Nesna Teachers' College and the University of Oslo. She worked as a teacher in Mosjøen, got married in 1966 and had five children. The family eventually moved to several locations all over Norway.

She was a part of the Socialist Left Party from its inception in 1975, at the time residing in Holtålen. From the late 1970s, the family resided in Flora where Heir was a teacher at Krokane school. She was also a member of the municipal council of Flora. In February 1983, she was elected leader of Sogn og Fjordane Socialist Left Party. In August 1983 she moved with her family to Namsos.

In February 1986, she became leader of her second county branch, Nord-Trøndelag Socialist Left Party. She stood on the Socialist Left Party ballot twice, both times in second place; first in the 1985 parliamentary election behind Per Aunet, and second in the 1987 county election. She resigned as regional party leader and from the county council in 1991 as she moved again.

Settling in Sørum, Heir served in the Socialist Left Party national leadership as leader of women's policy. She served as a deputy representative to the Parliament of Norway from Nord-Trøndelag and Akershus during the terms 1989–1993 and 1993–1997. In total she met during 103 days of parliamentary session.

Heir later served as headmaster of Manglerud Upper Secondary School. She died in January 2024.
