= Vebjørn =

Vebjørn is a given name. Notable people with the given name include:

- Vebjørn Berg (born 1980), Norwegian sports shooter
- Vebjørn Gorseth (born 1994), Norwegian politician
- Vebjørn Hoff (born 1996), Norwegian footballer
- Vebjørn Rodal (born 1972), Norwegian middle distance athlete
- Vebjørn Sand (born 1966), Norwegian painter and artist
- Vebjørn Selbekk (born 1969), Norwegian newspaper editor and author
- Vebjørn Tandberg (1904–1978), Norwegian electronics engineer
- Vebjørn Vinje (born 1995), Norwegian footballer
