= Nord-Trøndelag (Storting constituency) =

Constituency of the Storting, the national legislature of Norway

- Noerhte-Tröndelaage
- Constituency for the Storting
- Location of Nord-Trøndelag within Norway
- Municipality: List: Flatanger; Frosta; Grong; Høylandet; Inderøy; Leka; Levanger; Lierne; Meråker; Nærøysund; Namsos; Namsskogan; Overhalla; Raarvihke; Snåase; Steinkjer; Stjørdal; Verdal
- County: Trøndelag
- Population: 136,340 (2025)
- Electorate: 101,928 (2025)
- Area: 21,944 km^{2} (2025)

Current constituency
- Created: 1921
- Seats: List: 4 (2013–present); 5 (2005–2013); 6 (1953–2005); 5 (1921–1953)
- Members of the Storting: List: Bente Estil (Ap); Vebjørn Gorseth (Ap); Bjørn Arild Gram (Sp); Mats Henriksen (FrP); Oda Indgaard (MDG)
- Created from: List: Namdalen; Snaasen; Stjørdalen; Værdalen

Nord-Trøndelag (lit. transl. North Trøndelag; Southern Sami: Noerhte-Tröndelaage) is one of the 19 multi-member constituencies of the Storting, the national legislature of Norway. The constituency was established in 1921 following the introduction of proportional representation for elections to the Storting. It consists of the municipalities of Flatanger, Frosta, Grong, Høylandet, Inderøy, Leka, Levanger, Lierne, Meråker, Nærøysund, Namsos, Namsskogan, Overhalla, Raarvihke, Snåase, Steinkjer, Stjørdal and Verdal in the county of Trøndelag. The constituency currently elects four of the 169 members of the Storting using the open party-list proportional representation electoral system. At the 2025 parliamentary election it had 101,928 registered electors.

== Electoral system ==
Nord-Trøndelag currently elects four of the 169 members of the Storting using the open (Note: Although technically elections to the Storting have open lists, they are in effect closed lists as a majority of those voting for a party must make changes to the lists for the changes to take effect, which has never happened since the introduction of proportional representation in 1921, and as result candidates are elected in the order submitted by the party.) party-list proportional representation electoral system. Constituency seats are allocated by the County Electoral Committee using the Modified Sainte-Laguë method. Compensatory seats (seats at large or levelling seats) are calculated based on the national vote and are allocated by the National Electoral Committee using the Modified Sainte-Laguë method at the constituency level (one for each constituency). Only parties that reach the 4% national threshold compete for compensatory seats.

== Election results ==
=== Summary ===
Election	Communists K			Reds R / RV / FMS			Socialist Left SV / SF			Labour Ap			Greens MDG			Centre Sp / Bp / L			Liberals V			Christian Democrats KrF			Conservatives H			Progress FrP / ALP		
Election	Votes	%	Seats	Votes	%	Seats	Votes	%	Seats	Votes	%	Seats	Votes	%	Seats	Votes	%	Seats	Votes	%	Seats	Votes	%	Seats	Votes	%	Seats	Votes	%	Seats
2025				4,115	5.18%	0	3,330	4.20%	0	28,821	36.31%	2	1,884	2.37%	0	11,776	14.84%	1	1,447	1.82%	0	2,081	2.62%	0	7,157	9.02%	0	15,457	19.47%	1
2021				3,035	3.96%	0	4,389	5.73%	0	25,730	33.57%	2	1,424	1.86%	0	22,089	28.82%	2	1,557	2.03%	0	1,726	2.25%	0	8,121	10.60%	0	6,146	8.02%	0
2017				1,282	1.63%	0	3,951	5.04%	0	26,822	34.20%	2	1,386	1.77%	0	19,155	24.43%	1	1,758	2.24%	0	2,115	2.70%	0	11,568	14.75%	1	9,014	11.49%	0
2013				423	0.55%	0	2,596	3.39%	0	32,054	41.90%	2	1,051	1.37%	0	12,796	16.73%	1	3,158	4.13%	0	2,707	3.54%	0	11,128	14.55%	1	9,869	12.90%	0
2009				447	0.62%	0	4,685	6.47%	0	31,466	43.46%	3	125	0.17%	0	11,259	15.55%	1	2,119	2.93%	0	2,917	4.03%	0	6,465	8.93%	0	12,641	17.46%	1
2005				363	0.49%	0	8,399	11.45%	1	29,359	40.03%	2	73	0.10%	0	11,966	16.32%	1	3,165	4.32%	0	3,439	4.69%	0	5,094	6.95%	0	10,916	14.88%	1
2001	47	0.07%	0	296	0.42%	0	9,672	13.80%	1	22,704	32.39%	2	78	0.11%	0	10,877	15.52%	1	2,399	3.42%	0	7,259	10.35%	1	7,188	10.25%	0	7,457	10.64%	1
1997	85	0.12%	0	742	1.01%	0	4,601	6.28%	0	29,370	40.07%	3	102	0.14%	0	14,003	19.11%	1	3,446	4.70%	0	8,845	12.07%	1	4,981	6.80%	0	6,651	9.07%	1
1993				340	0.47%	0	7,070	9.75%	1	27,852	38.42%	3				22,555	31.11%	2	2,967	4.09%	0	3,322	4.58%	0	5,878	8.11%	0	1,777	2.45%	0
1989				266	0.34%	0	10,216	12.98%	1	30,326	38.52%	3	130	0.17%	0	14,816	18.82%	1	3,626	4.61%	0	4,155	5.28%	0	8,893	11.30%	1	6,124	7.78%	0
1985	149	0.19%	0	272	0.35%	0	4,601	5.87%	0	36,894	47.09%	3				14,344	18.31%	2	3,947	5.04%	0	4,012	5.12%	0	12,032	15.36%	1	1,497	1.91%	0
1981	306	0.42%	0	466	0.64%	0	3,266	4.45%	0	31,331	42.74%	3				16,661	22.73%	2	6,226	8.49%	0				13,014	17.75%	1	1,444	1.97%	0
1977	300	0.45%	0	324	0.48%	0	2,515	3.75%	0	31,094	46.37%	3				14,301	21.33%	2	6,100	9.10%	0				11,619	17.33%	1	677	1.01%	0
1973				249	0.40%	0	6,228	10.01%	0	23,218	37.32%	3				20,390	32.77%	2							8,669	13.93%	1	1,478	2.38%	0
1969	621	0.97%	0				1,728	2.71%	0	29,722	46.53%	3				16,644	26.06%	2	6,941	10.87%	1	3,994	6.25%	0	4,228	6.62%	0			
1965	681	1.12%	0				3,440	5.64%	0	26,475	43.42%	3				14,310	23.47%	2	7,530	12.35%	1	4,124	6.76%	0	4,413	7.24%	0			
1961	1,541	2.77%	0							26,638	47.84%	3				13,362	24.00%	2	6,042	10.85%	1	4,840	8.69%	0	3,256	5.85%	0			
1957	1,272	2.31%	0							27,104	49.28%	3				12,914	23.48%	2	6,317	11.48%	1	4,713	8.57%	0	2,684	4.88%	0			
1953	2,187	3.96%	0							26,740	48.42%	3				12,342	22.35%	2	6,347	11.49%	1	4,355	7.89%	0	3,254	5.89%	0			
1949	2,219	4.12%	0							25,804	47.87%	3				13,436	24.93%	1	8,559	15.88%	1	3,645	6.76%	0						
1945	3,224	7.37%	0							20,242	46.28%	3				9,589	21.92%	1	8,710	19.91%	1				1,971	4.51%	0			
1936										19,348	41.89%	2				13,175	28.52%	2	9,580	20.74%	1				2,758	5.97%	0			
1933	824	2.02%	0							15,307	37.60%	2				11,990	29.45%	2	9,148	22.47%	1				3,235	7.95%	0			
1930	706	1.89%	0							10,610	28.41%	2				12,792	34.26%	2	9,196	24.63%	1				4,037	10.81%	0			
1927	1,024	3.29%	0							9,838	31.60%	2				9,804	31.49%	2	8,434	27.09%	1				2,029	6.52%	0			
1924	1,262	4.09%	0							5,518	17.90%	1				9,155	29.69%	2	8,490	27.54%	2				3,878	12.58%	0			
1921										5,077	17.46%	1				8,823	30.34%	2	7,472	25.70%	2				3,385	11.64%	0			

(Excludes compensatory seats. Figures in italics represent joint lists.)

=== Detailed ===
==== 2020s ====
===== 2025 =====
Results of the 2025 parliamentary election held on 8 September 2025:

Party		Votes	%	Seats		
Party		Votes	%	Con.	Com.	Tot.
Labour Party	Ap	28,821	36.31%	2	0	2
Progress Party	FrP	15,457	19.47%	1	0	1
Centre Party	Sp	11,776	14.84%	1	0	1
Conservative Party	H	7,157	9.02%	0	0	0
Red Party	R	4,115	5.18%	0	0	0
Socialist Left Party	SV	3,330	4.20%	0	0	0
Christian Democratic Party	KrF	2,081	2.62%	0	0	0
Green Party	MDG	1,884	2.37%	0	1	1
Liberal Party	V	1,447	1.82%	0	0	0
Pensioners' Party	PP	815	1.03%	0	0	0
Industry and Business Party	INP	676	0.85%	0	0	0
Norway Democrats	ND	563	0.71%	0	0	0
Generation Party	GP	429	0.54%	0	0	0
Conservative	K	264	0.33%	0	0	0
DNI Party	DNI	225	0.28%	0	0	0
Peace and Justice	FOR	170	0.21%	0	0	0
Welfare and Innovation Party	VIP	110	0.14%	0	0	0
Center Party	PS	59	0.07%	0	0	0
Valid votes		79,379	100.00%	4	1	5
Blank votes		651	0.81%			
Rejected votes – other		163	0.20%			
Total polled		80,193	78.68%			
Registered electors		101,928				

The following candidates were elected:

- Constituency seats - Bente Estil (Ap); Vebjørn Gorseth (Ap); Bjørn Arild Gram (Sp); and Mats Henriksen (FrP).
- Compensatory seat - Oda Indgaard (MDG).

===== 2021 =====
Results of the 2021 parliamentary election held on 13 September 2021:

Party		Votes	%	Seats		
Party		Votes	%	Con.	Com.	Tot.
Labour Party	Ap	25,730	33.57%	2	0	2
Centre Party	Sp	22,089	28.82%	2	0	2
Conservative Party	H	8,121	10.60%	0	0	0
Progress Party	FrP	6,146	8.02%	0	0	0
Socialist Left Party	SV	4,389	5.73%	0	0	0
Red Party	R	3,035	3.96%	0	0	0
Christian Democratic Party	KrF	1,726	2.25%	0	0	0
Liberal Party	V	1,557	2.03%	0	1	1
Green Party	MDG	1,424	1.86%	0	0	0
Democrats in Norway		754	0.98%	0	0	0
Pensioners' Party	PP	643	0.84%	0	0	0
Industry and Business Party	INP	359	0.47%	0	0	0
The Christians	PDK	179	0.23%	0	0	0
Health Party		145	0.19%	0	0	0
Center Party		129	0.17%	0	0	0
Alliance - Alternative for Norway		79	0.10%	0	0	0
Capitalist Party		60	0.08%	0	0	0
Pirate Party of Norway		55	0.07%	0	0	0
People's Action No to More Road Tolls	FNB	23	0.03%	0	0	0
Valid votes		76,643	100.00%	4	1	5
Blank votes		396	0.51%			
Rejected votes – other		129	0.17%			
Total polled		77,168	76.68%			
Registered electors		100,638				

The following candidates were elected:

- Constituency seats - Marit Arnstad (Sp); Ingvild Kjerkol (Ap); Terje Sørvik (Ap); and Per Olav Tyldum (Sp).
- Compensatory seat - André N. Skjelstad (V).

==== 2010s ====
===== 2017 =====
Results of the 2017 parliamentary election held on 11 September 2017:

Party		Votes	%	Seats		
Party		Votes	%	Con.	Com.	Tot.
Labour Party	Ap	26,822	34.20%	2	0	2
Centre Party	Sp	19,155	24.43%	1	0	1
Conservative Party	H	11,568	14.75%	1	0	1
Progress Party	FrP	9,014	11.49%	0	0	0
Socialist Left Party	SV	3,951	5.04%	0	0	0
Christian Democratic Party	KrF	2,115	2.70%	0	0	0
Liberal Party	V	1,758	2.24%	0	1	1
Green Party	MDG	1,386	1.77%	0	0	0
Red Party	R	1,282	1.63%	0	0	0
Pensioners' Party	PP	463	0.59%	0	0	0
Health Party		295	0.38%	0	0	0
The Christians	PDK	169	0.22%	0	0	0
Pirate Party of Norway		112	0.14%	0	0	0
Democrats in Norway		98	0.12%	0	0	0
The Alliance		91	0.12%	0	0	0
Capitalist Party		78	0.10%	0	0	0
Coastal Party	KP	61	0.08%	0	0	0
Valid votes		78,418	100.00%	4	1	5
Blank votes		461	0.58%			
Rejected votes – other		102	0.13%			
Total polled		78,981	77.41%			
Registered electors		102,031				

The following candidates were elected:

- Constituency seats - Elin Rodum Agdestein (H); Marit Arnstad (Sp); Arild Grande (Ap); and Ingvild Kjerkol (Ap).
- Compensatory seat - André N. Skjelstad (V).

===== 2013 =====
Results of the 2013 parliamentary election held on 8 and 9 September 2013:

Party		Votes	%	Seats		
Party		Votes	%	Con.	Com.	Tot.
Labour Party	Ap	32,054	41.90%	2	0	2
Centre Party	Sp	12,796	16.73%	1	0	1
Conservative Party	H	11,128	14.55%	1	0	1
Progress Party	FrP	9,869	12.90%	0	0	0
Liberal Party	V	3,158	4.13%	0	1	1
Christian Democratic Party	KrF	2,707	3.54%	0	0	0
Socialist Left Party	SV	2,596	3.39%	0	0	0
Green Party	MDG	1,051	1.37%	0	0	0
Red Party	R	423	0.55%	0	0	0
The Christians	PDK	283	0.37%	0	0	0
Pirate Party of Norway		209	0.27%	0	0	0
Christian Unity Party	KSP	107	0.14%	0	0	0
Coastal Party	KP	81	0.11%	0	0	0
Democrats in Norway		38	0.05%	0	0	0
Valid votes		76,500	100.00%	4	1	5
Blank votes		343	0.45%			
Rejected votes – other		91	0.12%			
Total polled		76,934	76.99%			
Registered electors		99,921				

The following candidates were elected:

- Constituency seats - Elin Rodum Agdestein (H); Marit Arnstad (Sp); Arild Grande (Ap); and Ingvild Kjerkol (Ap).
- Compensatory seat - André N. Skjelstad (V).

==== 2000s ====
===== 2009 =====
Results of the 2009 parliamentary election held on 13 and 14 September 2009:

Party		Votes	%	Seats		
Party		Votes	%	Con.	Com.	Tot.
Labour Party	Ap	31,466	43.46%	3	0	3
Progress Party	FrP	12,641	17.46%	1	0	1
Centre Party	Sp	11,259	15.55%	1	0	1
Conservative Party	H	6,465	8.93%	0	1	1
Socialist Left Party	SV	4,685	6.47%	0	0	0
Christian Democratic Party	KrF	2,917	4.03%	0	0	0
Liberal Party	V	2,119	2.93%	0	0	0
Red Party	R	447	0.62%	0	0	0
Christian Unity Party	KSP	128	0.18%	0	0	0
Green Party	MDG	125	0.17%	0	0	0
Coastal Party	KP	116	0.16%	0	0	0
Democrats in Norway		37	0.05%	0	0	0
Valid votes		72,405	100.00%	5	1	6
Blank votes		360	0.49%			
Rejected votes – other		55	0.08%			
Total polled		72,820	74.44%			
Registered electors		97,830				

The following candidates were elected:

- Constituency seats - Susanne Bratli (Ap); Lars Peder Brekk (Sp); Robert Eriksson (FrP); Arild Grande (Ap); and Gerd Janne Kristoffersen (Ap).
- Compensatory seat - Lars Myraune (H).

===== 2005 =====
Results of the 2005 parliamentary election held on 11 and 12 September 2005:

Party		Votes	%	Seats		
Party		Votes	%	Con.	Com.	Tot.
Labour Party	Ap	29,359	40.03%	2	0	2
Centre Party	Sp	11,966	16.32%	1	0	1
Progress Party	FrP	10,916	14.88%	1	0	1
Socialist Left Party	SV	8,399	11.45%	1	0	1
Conservative Party	H	5,094	6.95%	0	0	0
Christian Democratic Party	KrF	3,439	4.69%	0	0	0
Liberal Party	V	3,165	4.32%	0	1	1
Coastal Party	KP	417	0.57%	0	0	0
Red Electoral Alliance	RV	363	0.49%	0	0	0
Christian Unity Party	KSP	111	0.15%	0	0	0
Green Party	MDG	73	0.10%	0	0	0
Democrats		36	0.05%	0	0	0
Valid votes		73,338	100.00%	5	1	6
Blank votes		247	0.34%			
Rejected votes – other		56	0.08%			
Total polled		73,641	76.65%			
Registered electors		96,077				

The following candidates were elected:

- Constituency seats - Lars Peder Brekk (Sp); Robert Eriksson (FrP); Bjarne Håkon Hanssen (Ap); Gerd Janne Kristoffersen (Ap); and Inge Ryan (SV).
- Compensatory seat - André N. Skjelstad (V).

===== 2001 =====
Results of the 2001 parliamentary election held on 9 and 10 September 2001:

Party		Votes	%	Seats		
Party		Votes	%	Con.	Com.	Tot.
Labour Party	Ap	22,704	32.39%	2	0	2
Centre Party	Sp	10,877	15.52%	1	0	1
Socialist Left Party	SV	9,672	13.80%	1	0	1
Progress Party	FrP	7,457	10.64%	1	0	1
Christian Democratic Party	KrF	7,259	10.35%	1	0	1
Conservative Party	H	7,188	10.25%	0	0	0
Liberal Party	V	2,399	3.42%	0	0	0
Coastal Party	KP	1,355	1.93%	0	0	0
The Political Party	DPP	349	0.50%	0	0	0
Red Electoral Alliance	RV	296	0.42%	0	0	0
Christian Unity Party	KSP	200	0.29%	0	0	0
Non-Partisan Coastal and Rural District Party		90	0.13%	0	0	0
Green Party	MDG	78	0.11%	0	0	0
Norwegian People's Party	NFP	49	0.07%	0	0	0
Communist Party of Norway	K	47	0.07%	0	0	0
Social Democrats		46	0.07%	0	0	0
Fatherland Party	FLP	38	0.05%	0	0	0
Valid votes		70,104	100.00%	6	0	6
Rejected votes		418	0.59%			
Total polled		70,522	73.93%			
Registered electors		95,390				

The following candidates were elected:

- Constituency seats - Marit Arnstad (Sp); Aud Gaundal (Ap); Bjarne Håkon Hanssen (Ap); Arne Lyngstad (KrF); Inge Ryan (SV); and Per Sandberg (FrP).

==== 1990s ====
===== 1997 =====
Results of the 1997 parliamentary election held on 15 September 1997:

Party		Votes	%	Seats		
Party		Votes	%	Con.	Com.	Tot.
Labour Party	Ap	29,370	40.07%	3	0	3
Centre Party	Sp	14,003	19.11%	1	0	1
Christian Democratic Party	KrF	8,845	12.07%	1	0	1
Progress Party	FrP	6,651	9.07%	1	0	1
Conservative Party	H	4,981	6.80%	0	0	0
Socialist Left Party	SV	4,601	6.28%	0	0	0
Liberal Party	V	3,446	4.70%	0	0	0
Red Electoral Alliance	RV	742	1.01%	0	0	0
Pensioners' Party	PP	355	0.48%	0	0	0
Green Party	MDG	102	0.14%	0	0	0
Communist Party of Norway	K	85	0.12%	0	0	0
Fatherland Party	FLP	76	0.10%	0	0	0
Natural Law Party		34	0.05%	0	0	0
Valid votes		73,291	100.00%	6	0	6
Rejected votes		242	0.33%			
Total polled		73,533	76.49%			
Registered electors		96,137				

The following candidates were elected:

- Constituency seats - Jon Olav Alstad (Ap); Aud Gaundal (Ap); Bjarne Håkon Hanssen (Ap); Johan J. Jakobsen (Sp); Arne Lyngstad (KrF); and Per Sandberg (FrP).

===== 1993 =====
Results of the 1993 parliamentary election held on 12 and 13 September 1993:

Party		Votes	%	Seats		
Party		Votes	%	Con.	Com.	Tot.
Labour Party	Ap	27,852	38.42%	3	0	3
Centre Party	Sp	22,555	31.11%	2	0	2
Socialist Left Party	SV	7,070	9.75%	1	0	1
Conservative Party	H	5,878	8.11%	0	0	0
Christian Democratic Party	KrF	3,322	4.58%	0	0	0
Liberal Party	V	2,967	4.09%	0	0	0
Progress Party	FrP	1,777	2.45%	0	0	0
Pensioners' Party/Common Future		353	0.49%	0	0	0
Red Electoral Alliance	RV	340	0.47%	0	0	0
New Future Coalition Party	SNF	161	0.22%	0	0	0
Fatherland Party	FLP	134	0.18%	0	0	0
Natural Law Party		82	0.11%	0	0	0
Valid votes		72,491	100.00%	6	0	6
Rejected votes		192	0.26%			
Total polled		72,683	75.14%			
Registered electors		96,728				

The following candidates were elected:

- Constituency seats - Jon Olav Alstad (Ap); Marit Arnstad (Sp); Aud Gaundal (Ap); Roger Gudmundseth (Ap); Jorunn Hageler (SV); and Johan J. Jakobsen (Sp).

==== 1980s ====
===== 1989 =====
Results of the 1989 parliamentary election held on 10 and 11 September 1989:

Party		Votes	%	Seats		
Party		Votes	%	Con.	Com.	Tot.
Labour Party	Ap	30,326	38.52%	3	0	3
Centre Party	Sp	14,816	18.82%	1	0	1
Socialist Left Party	SV	10,216	12.98%	1	0	1
Conservative Party	H	8,893	11.30%	1	0	1
Progress Party	FrP	6,124	7.78%	0	0	0
Christian Democratic Party	KrF	4,155	5.28%	0	0	0
Liberal Party	V	3,626	4.61%	0	0	0
County Lists for Environment and Solidarity	FMS	266	0.34%	0	0	0
Stop Immigration	SI	180	0.23%	0	0	0
Green Party	MDG	130	0.17%	0	0	0
Valid votes		78,732	100.00%	6	0	6
Rejected votes		129	0.16%			
Total polled		78,861	82.57%			
Registered electors		95,505				

The following candidates were elected:

- Constituency seats - Per Aunet (SV); Inger Lise Gjørv (Ap); Roger Gudmundseth (Ap); Johan J. Jakobsen (Sp); Wenche Frogn Sellæg (H); and Inge Staldvik (Ap).

===== 1985 =====
Results of the 1985 parliamentary election held on 8 and 9 September 1985:

Party		Party			List Alliance		
Party		Votes	%	Seats	Votes	%	Seats
Labour Party	Ap	36,894	47.09%	4	36,894	47.41%	3
Centre Party	Sp	14,344	18.31%	1	18,293	23.51%	2
Christian Democratic Party	KrF	4,012	5.12%	0	18,293	23.51%	2
Liberal People's Party	DLF	459	0.59%	0	18,293	23.51%	2
Conservative Party	H	12,032	15.36%	1	12,032	15.46%	1
Socialist Left Party	SV	4,601	5.87%	0	4,601	5.91%	0
Liberal Party	V	3,947	5.04%	0	3,947	5.07%	0
Progress Party	FrP	1,497	1.91%	0	1,497	1.92%	0
Red Electoral Alliance	RV	272	0.35%	0	272	0.35%	0
Communist Party of Norway	K	149	0.19%	0	149	0.19%	0
Pensioners' Party	PP	139	0.18%	0	139	0.18%	0
Valid votes		78,346	100.00%	6	77,824	100.00%	6
Rejected votes		98	0.12%				
Total polled		78,444	83.90%				
Registered electors		93,498					

As the list alliance was entitled to more seats contesting as an alliance than it was contesting as individual parties, the distribution of seats was as list alliance votes. The Sp-KrF-DLF list alliance's additional seat was allocated to the Centre Party.

The following candidates were elected: Reidar Due (Sp); Inger Lise Gjørv (Ap); Roger Gudmundseth (Ap); Johan J. Jakobsen (Sp); Wenche Frogn Sellæg (H); and Inge Staldvik (Ap).

===== 1981 =====
Results of the 1981 parliamentary election held on 13 and 14 September 1981:

Party		Votes	%	Seats
Labour Party	Ap	31,331	42.74%	3
Centre Party and Christian Democratic Party	Sp-KrF	16,661	22.73%	2
Conservative Party	H	13,014	17.75%	1
Liberal Party	V	6,226	8.49%	0
Socialist Left Party	SV	3,266	4.45%	0
Progress Party	FrP	1,444	1.97%	0
Liberal People's Party	DLF	536	0.73%	0
Red Electoral Alliance	RV	466	0.64%	0
Communist Party of Norway	K	306	0.42%	0
Plebiscite Party		35	0.05%	0
Free Elected Representatives		29	0.04%	0
Valid votes		73,314	100.00%	6
Rejected votes		72	0.10%	
Total polled		73,386	81.18%	
Registered electors		90,403		

The following candidates were elected: Reidar Due (Sp-KrF); Inger Lise Gjørv (Ap); Roger Gudmundseth (Ap); Guttorm Hansen (Ap); Johan J. Jakobsen (Sp-KrF); and Gunnar Vada (H).

==== 1970s ====
===== 1977 =====
Results of the 1977 parliamentary election held on 11 and 12 September 1977:

Party		Votes	%	Seats
Labour Party	Ap	31,094	46.37%	3
Centre Party	Sp	14,301	21.33%	2
Conservative Party and Christian Democratic Party	H-KrF	11,619	17.33%	1
Liberal Party and New People's Party	V-DNF	6,100	9.10%	0
Socialist Left Party	SV	2,515	3.75%	0
Progress Party	FrP	677	1.01%	0
Red Electoral Alliance	RV	324	0.48%	0
Communist Party of Norway	K	300	0.45%	0
Norwegian Democratic Party		49	0.07%	0
Single Person's Party		45	0.07%	0
Free Elected Representatives		31	0.05%	0
Valid votes		67,055	100.00%	6
Rejected votes		87	0.13%	
Total polled		67,142	80.96%	
Registered electors		82,935		

The following candidates were elected: Reidar Due (Sp); Inger Lise Gjørv (Ap); Guttorm Hansen (Ap); Johan J. Jakobsen (Sp); Johnny Stenberg (Ap); and Gunnar Vada (H-KrF).

===== 1973 =====
Results of the 1973 parliamentary election held on 9 and 10 September 1973:

Party		Votes	%	Seats
Labour Party	Ap	23,218	37.32%	3
Centre Party and Liberal Party	Sp-V	20,390	32.77%	2
Conservative Party and Christian Democratic Party	H-KrF	8,669	13.93%	1
Socialist Electoral League	SV	6,228	10.01%	0
New People's Party	DNF	1,797	2.89%	0
Anders Lange's Party	ALP	1,478	2.38%	0
Red Electoral Alliance	RV	249	0.40%	0
Single Person's Party		66	0.11%	0
Norwegian Democratic Party		63	0.10%	0
Women's Free Elected Representatives		63	0.10%	0
Valid votes		62,221	100.00%	6
Rejected votes		77	0.12%	
Total polled		62,298	78.30%	
Registered electors		79,564		

The following candidates were elected: Ottar Gravås (H-KrF); Guttorm Hansen (Ap); Johan J. Jakobsen (Sp-V); Johnny Stenberg (Ap); Johan Støa (Ap); and Johan A. Vikan (Sp-V).

==== 1960s ====
===== 1969 =====
Results of the 1969 parliamentary election held on 7 and 8 September 1969:

Party		Votes	%	Seats
Labour Party	Ap	29,722	46.53%	3
Centre Party	Sp	16,644	26.06%	2
Liberal Party	V	6,941	10.87%	1
Conservative Party	H	4,228	6.62%	0
Christian Democratic Party	KrF	3,994	6.25%	0
Socialist People's Party	SF	1,728	2.71%	0
Communist Party of Norway	K	621	0.97%	0
Valid votes		63,878	100.00%	6
Rejected votes		116	0.18%	
Total polled		63,994	83.73%	
Registered electors		76,429		

The following candidates were elected: Inge Einarsen Bartnes (Sp); Leif Granli (Ap); Guttorm Hansen (Ap); Ola H. Kveli (V); Johan Støa (Ap); and Johan A. Vikan (Sp).

===== 1965 =====
Results of the 1965 parliamentary election held on 12 and 13 September 1965:

Party		Votes	%	Seats
Labour Party	Ap	26,475	43.42%	3
Centre Party	Sp	14,310	23.47%	2
Liberal Party	V	7,530	12.35%	1
Conservative Party	H	4,413	7.24%	0
Christian Democratic Party	KrF	4,124	6.76%	0
Socialist People's Party	SF	3,440	5.64%	0
Communist Party of Norway	K	681	1.12%	0
Valid votes		60,973	100.00%	6
Rejected votes		198	0.32%	
Total polled		61,171	84.36%	
Registered electors		72,511		

The following candidates were elected: Inge Einarsen Bartnes (Sp); Leif Granli (Ap); Guttorm Hansen (Ap); Jon Leirfall (Sp); Bjarne Lyngstad (V); and Johan Støa (Ap).

===== 1961 =====
Results of the 1961 parliamentary election held on 11 September 1961:

Party		Votes	%	Seats
Labour Party	Ap	26,638	47.84%	3
Centre Party	Sp	13,362	24.00%	2
Liberal Party	V	6,042	10.85%	1
Christian Democratic Party	KrF	4,840	8.69%	0
Conservative Party	H	3,256	5.85%	0
Communist Party of Norway	K	1,541	2.77%	0
Wild Votes		1	0.00%	0
Valid votes		55,680	100.00%	6
Rejected votes		260	0.46%	
Total polled		55,940	77.78%	
Registered electors		71,919		

The following candidates were elected: Inge Einarsen Bartnes (Sp), 13,362 votes; Gunvald Engelstad (Ap), 26,629 votes; Leif Granli (Ap), 26,638 votes; Guttorm Hansen (Ap), 26,634 votes; Jon Leirfall (Sp), 13,363 votes; and Bjarne Lyngstad (V), 6,022 votes.

==== 1950s ====
===== 1957 =====
Results of the 1957 parliamentary election held on 7 October 1957:

Party		Votes	%	Seats
Labour Party	Ap	27,104	49.28%	3
Farmers' Party	Bp	12,914	23.48%	2
Liberal Party	V	6,317	11.48%	1
Christian Democratic Party	KrF	4,713	8.57%	0
Conservative Party	H	2,684	4.88%	0
Communist Party of Norway	K	1,272	2.31%	0
Valid votes		55,004	100.00%	6
Rejected votes		215	0.39%	
Total polled		55,219	76.69%	
Registered electors		72,000		

The following candidates were elected: Inge Einarsen Bartnes (Bp); Olav Benum (V); Gunvald Engelstad (Ap); Leif Granli (Ap); Jon Leirfall (Bp); and Gustav Sjaastad (Ap).

===== 1953 =====
Results of the 1953 parliamentary election held on 12 October 1953:

Party		Votes	%	Seats
Labour Party	Ap	26,740	48.42%	3
Farmers' Party	Bp	12,342	22.35%	2
Liberal Party	V	6,347	11.49%	1
Christian Democratic Party	KrF	4,355	7.89%	0
Conservative Party	H	3,254	5.89%	0
Communist Party of Norway	K	2,187	3.96%	0
Valid votes		55,225	100.00%	6
Rejected votes		267	0.48%	
Total polled		55,492	77.41%	
Registered electors		71,683		

The following candidates were elected: Inge Einarsen Bartnes (Bp); Olav Benum (V); Gunvald Engelstad (Ap); Leif Granli (Ap); Jon Leirfall (Bp); and Johan Wiik (Ap).

==== 1940s ====
===== 1949 =====
Results of the 1949 parliamentary election held on 10 October 1949:

Party		Votes	%	Seats
Labour Party	Ap	25,804	47.87%	3
Farmers' Party	Bp	13,436	24.93%	1
Liberal Party	V	8,559	15.88%	1
Christian Democratic Party	KrF	3,645	6.76%	0
Communist Party of Norway	K	2,219	4.12%	0
Society Party	Samfp	236	0.44%	0
Valid votes		53,899	100.00%	5
Rejected votes		321	0.59%	
Total polled		54,220	79.58%	
Registered electors		68,133		

The following candidates were elected: Olav Benum (V); Gunvald Engelstad (Ap); Leif Granli (Ap); Jon Leirfall (Bp); and Johan Wiik (Ap).

===== 1945 =====
Results of the 1945 parliamentary election held on 8 October 1945:

Party		Votes	%	Seats
Labour Party	Ap	20,242	46.28%	3
Farmers' Party	Bp	9,589	21.92%	1
Liberal Party	V	8,710	19.91%	1
Communist Party of Norway	K	3,224	7.37%	0
Conservative Party	H	1,971	4.51%	0
Valid votes		43,736	100.00%	5
Rejected votes		343	0.78%	
Total polled		44,079	71.90%	
Registered electors		61,303		

The following candidates were elected: Olav Benum (V); Gunvald Engelstad (Ap); Leif Granli (Ap); Jon Leirfall (Bp); and Johan Wiik (Ap).

==== 1930s ====
===== 1936 =====
Results of the 1936 parliamentary election held on 19 October 1936:

Party		Party			List Alliance		
Party		Votes	%	Seats	Votes	%	Seats
Labour Party	Ap	19,348	41.89%	2	19,348	41.90%	2
Farmers' Party	Bp	13,175	28.52%	2	15,921	34.48%	2
Conservative Party	H	2,758	5.97%	0	15,921	34.48%	2
Liberal Party	V	9,580	20.74%	1	9,580	20.74%	1
Society Party	Samfp	1,090	2.36%	0	1,090	2.36%	0
Nasjonal Samling	NS	242	0.52%	0	242	0.52%	0
Valid votes		46,193	100.00%	5	46,181	100.00%	5
Rejected votes		182	0.39%				
Total polled		46,375	83.07%				
Registered electors		55,827					

As the list alliance was not entitled to more seats contesting as an alliance than it was contesting as individual parties, the distribution of seats was as party votes.

The following candidates were elected: Ivar Kirkeby-Garstad (Bp); Albert Moen (Ap); Eliseus Müller (Bp); Johan Peter Trøite (V); and Johan Wiik (Ap).

===== 1933 =====
Results of the 1933 parliamentary election held on 16 October 1933:

Party		Party			List Alliance		
Party		Votes	%	Seats	Votes	%	Seats
Labour Party	Ap	15,307	37.60%	2	15,307	37.67%	2
Farmers' Party	Bp	11,990	29.45%	2	15,151	37.28%	2
Conservative Party	H	3,235	7.95%	0	15,151	37.28%	2
Liberal Party	V	9,148	22.47%	1	9,148	22.51%	1
Communist Party of Norway	K	824	2.02%	0	824	2.03%	0
Society Party	Samfp	209	0.51%	0	209	0.51%	0
Valid votes		40,713	100.00%	5	40,639	100.00%	5
Rejected votes		135	0.33%				
Total polled		40,848	76.71%				
Registered electors		53,251					

As the list alliance was not entitled to more seats contesting as an alliance than it was contesting as individual parties, the distribution of seats was as party votes.

The following candidates were elected: Håkon Five (V); Ivar Kirkeby-Garstad (Bp); Albert Moen (Ap); Eliseus Müller (Bp); and Johan Wiik (Ap).

===== 1930 =====
Results of the 1930 parliamentary election held on 20 October 1930:

Party		Votes	%	Seats
Farmers' Party	Bp	12,792	34.26%	2
Labour Party	Ap	10,610	28.41%	2
Liberal Party and Radical People's Party	V-RF	9,196	24.63%	1
Conservative Party and Free-minded Liberal Party	H-FV	4,037	10.81%	0
Communist Party of Norway	K	706	1.89%	0
Wild Votes		2	0.01%	0
Valid votes		37,343	100.00%	5
Rejected votes		114	0.30%	
Total polled		37,457	74.15%	
Registered electors		50,517		

The following candidates were elected: Ivar Kirkeby-Garstad (Bp); Ole H. Langhammer (Bp); Albert Moen (Ap); Anders Todal (V); and Johan Wiik (Ap).

==== 1920s ====
===== 1927 =====
Results of the 1927 parliamentary election held on 17 October 1927:

Party		Votes	%	Seats
Labour Party	Ap	9,838	31.60%	2
Farmers' Party	Bp	9,804	31.49%	2
Liberal Party	V	8,434	27.09%	1
Conservative Party and Free-minded Liberal Party	H-FV	2,029	6.52%	0
Communist Party of Norway	K	1,024	3.29%	0
Wild Votes		2	0.01%	0
Valid votes		31,131	100.00%	5
Rejected votes		283	0.90%	
Total polled		31,414	63.88%	
Registered electors		49,175		

The following candidates were elected: Håkon Five (V); Ivar Kirkeby-Garstad (Bp); Ole H. Langhammer (Bp); Albert Moen (Ap); and Johan Wiik (Ap).

===== 1924 =====
Results of the 1924 parliamentary election held on 21 October 1924:

Party		Votes	%	Seats
Farmers' Party	Bp	9,155	29.69%	2
Liberal Party	V	8,490	27.54%	2
Labour Party	Ap	5,518	17.90%	1
Conservative Party and Free-minded Liberal Party	H-FV	3,878	12.58%	0
Social Democratic Labour Party of Norway	S	1,450	4.70%	0
Communist Party of Norway	K	1,262	4.09%	0
Radical People's Party	RF	1,075	3.49%	0
Wild Votes		4	0.01%	0
Valid votes		30,832	100.00%	5
Rejected votes		288	0.93%	
Total polled		31,120	65.40%	
Registered electors		47,581		

The following candidates were elected: Håkon Five (V); Ivar Kirkeby-Garstad (Bp); Ole H. Langhammer (Bp); Albert Moen (Ap); and Johannes Okkenhaug (V).

===== 1921 =====
Results of the 1921 parliamentary election held on 24 October 1921:

Party		Votes	%	Seats
Norwegian Farmers' Association	L	8,823	30.34%	2
Liberal Party	V	7,472	25.70%	2
Labour Party	Ap	5,077	17.46%	1
Conservative Party and Free-minded Liberal Party	H-FV	3,385	11.64%	0
Radical People's Party	RF	2,170	7.46%	0
Social Democratic Labour Party of Norway	S	2,131	7.33%	0
Wild Votes		20	0.07%	0
Valid votes		29,078	100.00%	5
Rejected votes		362	1.23%	
Total polled		29,440	64.61%	
Registered electors		45,566		

The following candidates were elected: Johannes Bragstad (L); Håkon Five (V); Ivar Kirkeby-Garstad (L); Albert Moen (Ap); and Johannes Okkenhaug (V).
