= Johan Støa =

Johan Støa is the name of:

- Johan Støa (politician) (1913–1973), Norwegian politician
- Johan Støa (sportsperson) (1900–1991), Norwegian competitor in multiple sports
