= Tore O. Sandvik =

Norwegian politician (born 1969)

Tore Onshuus Sandvik
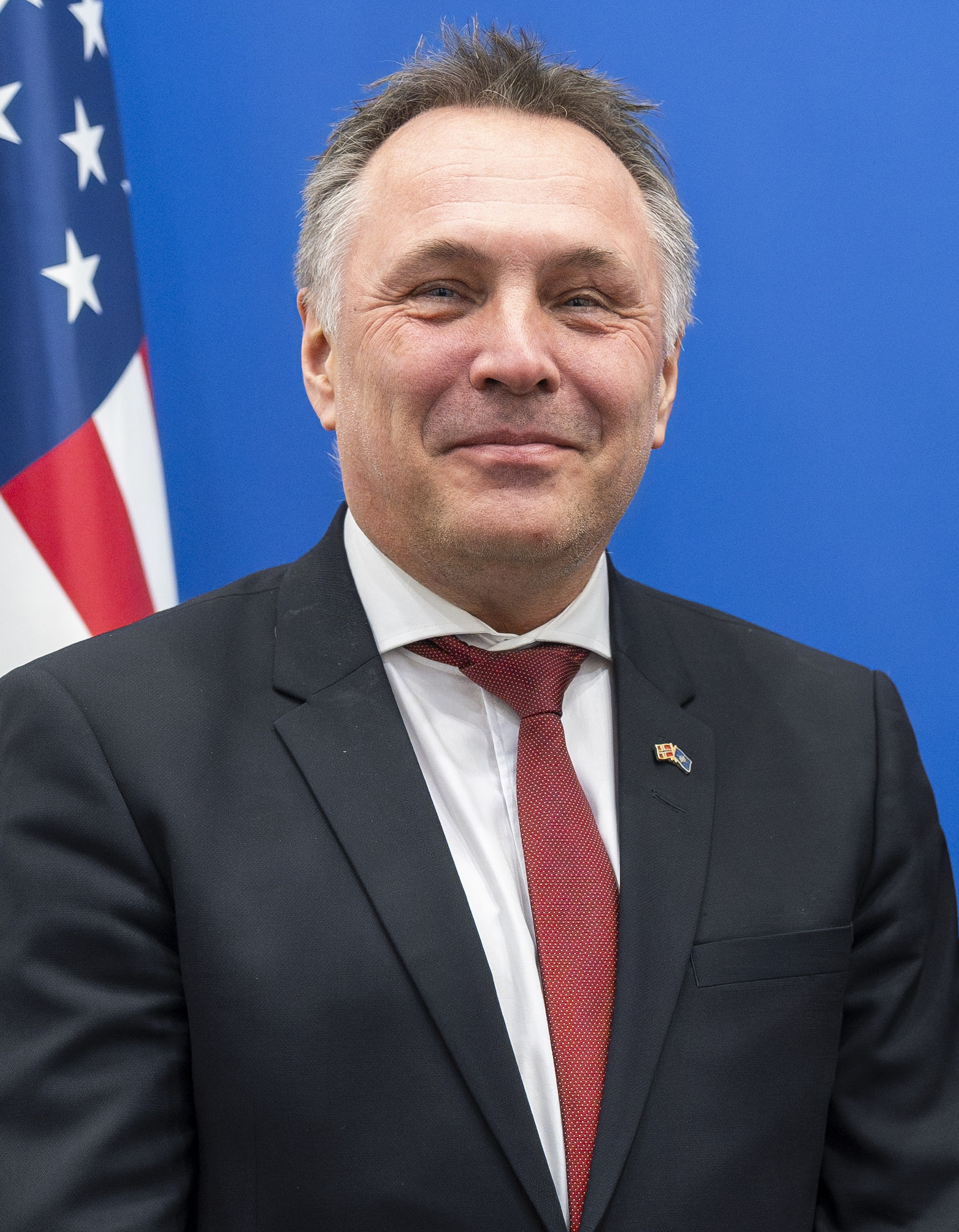
- Sandvik in 2025

Minister of Defence
- Incumbent
- Assumed office 4 February 2025
- Prime Minister: Jonas Gahr Støre
- Preceded by: Bjørn Arild Gram

County Mayor of Trøndelag
- In office 1 January 2018 – 18 October 2023
- Deputy: Tomas Iver Hallem
- Preceded by: Position established
- Succeeded by: Tomas Iver Hallem

County Mayor of Sør-Trøndelag
- In office 15 October 2003 – 31 December 2017
- Deputy: Beate Marie Dahl Eide; Arne Braut; Gunn Iversen Stokke
- Preceded by: Arnt Frøseth
- Succeeded by: Position abolished

Personal details
- Born: 31 August 1969 (age 57) Trondheim, Sør-Trøndelag, Norway
- Party: Labour
- Spouse: Trine Brænden
- Children: 4

Tore Onshuus Sandvik (born 31 August 1969) is a Norwegian politician. Between 2003 and 2023, he served as the County Mayor of Sør-Trøndelag until 2018, and Trøndelag until 2023. Since 2025, he has served as Norway's Minister of Defence.

== Political career ==
=== Youth league ===
As a young adult, Sandvik served as the County Youth Secretary in the Norwegian Confederation of Trade Unions and later Vice President of ETUC Youth.

=== State Secretary ===
In 2001 he was appointed State Secretary of the Norwegian Ministry of Trade and Industry. He was re-appointed in November 2023 following his departure as chairman of the county council.

=== Chairman of the Trøndelag County Council ===
Before he was elected County Mayor in 2003 he also worked as a project director for Extend. He was reelected in the 2007, 2011 and 2015 elections. When Nord and Sør-Trøndelag merged in 2018, he continued as county mayor for the new county before winning another term in the 2019 local elections. In 2022, Sandvik announced that he would not seek re-election in the 2023 local elections. The Trøndelag Labour Party chose Per Olav Skurdal Hopsø as their candidate for county mayor.

After the 2023 local elections, Labour's coalition partner the Centre Party joined the conservative block in order to get the county mayor position, thereby putting an end to Sandvik's term. He was succeeded by Tomas Iver Hallem on 18 October 2023.

=== Acting Minister of Climate and the Environment ===
Between 23 August and 31 December 2024, he served as acting minister of climate and the environment when Andreas Bjelland Eriksen went on paternal leave.

==== Tenure ====
In early October, the government announced that they wouldn't be able to hand in their planned climate goals for 2035 by January 2025 to the United Nations as originally planned. Sandvik stated that they were looking for inputs on what the new goals should be.

On 22 October, it was announced that Sandvik would be tasked with leading the negotiations regarding financing of the biodiversity framework at the 2024 United Nations Biodiversity Conference in Cali, Colombia.

Sandvik was part of the Norwegian delegation at COP29 in Baku and led negotiations at the conference concerning emissions cuts together with his South African counterpart, Dion George. By the end of the conference, he expressed that the countries had reached a solution and explained that Norway would be contributing with 3000 billion NOK in annual funding until 2035. He also remarked that the 1.5 degree target could have had a better outcome.

=== Minister of Defence ===
Following the Centre Party's withdrawal from government, he was appointed minister of defence on 4 February 2025.

==== 2025 ====
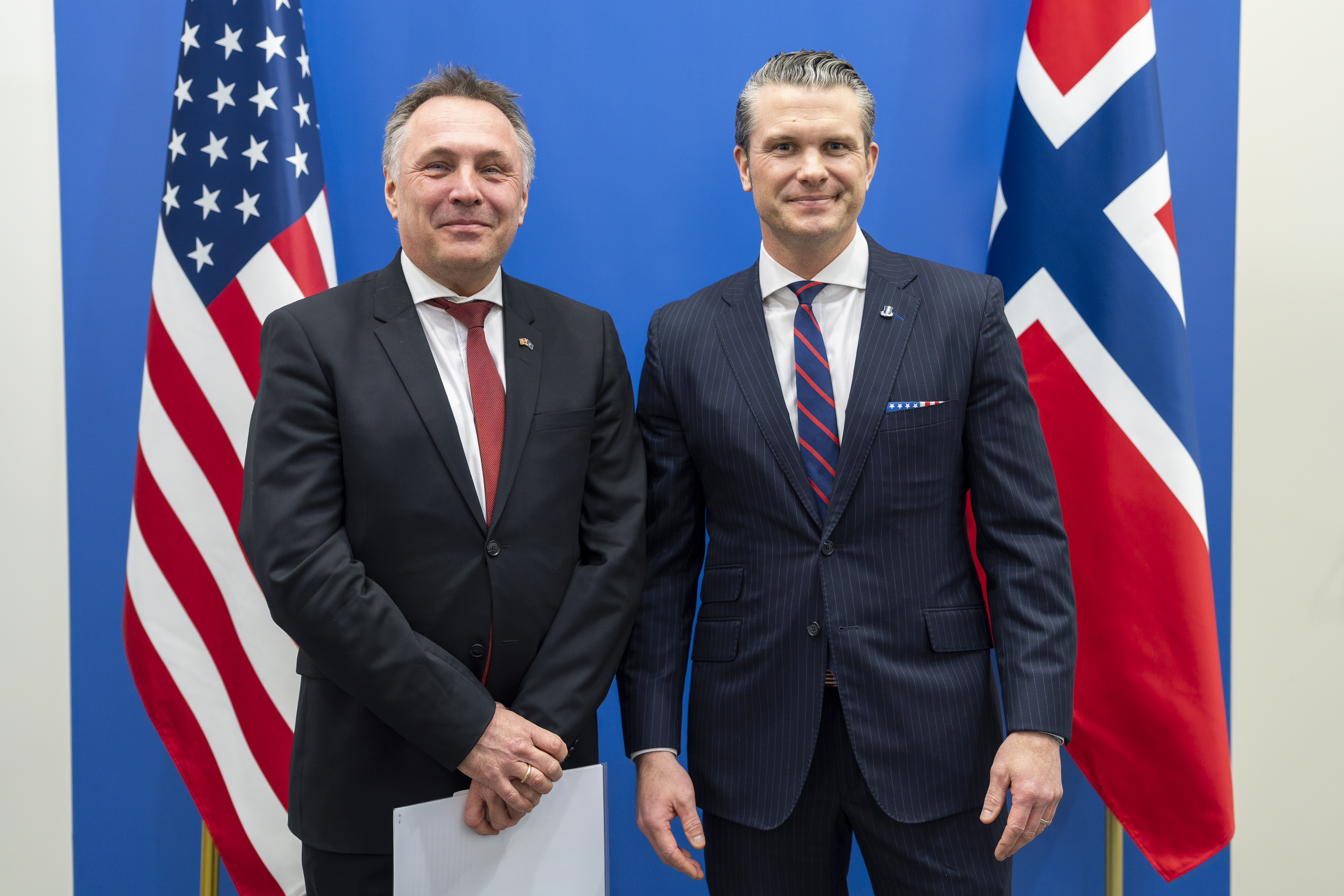
Sandvik with US Secretary of Defense Pete Hegseth at NATO Headquarters in February 2025

A week after his appointment, Sandvik attended a NATO summit in Brussels where he met with US Secretary of Defense Pete Hegseth and attended a meeting of the Ukraine Defence Contact Group alongside representatives of the 31 other NATO member states and 25 other countries. Sandvik further reiterated Norway's support for Ukraine.

After being criticised for not informing about the delays of a maritime army project in Ramsund in Southern Troms, Sandvik acknowledged in mid May that the government hadn't properly informed parliament about the recent delay of the project until 2026.

During a NATO defence ministers' summit in early June, Sandvik signed a defence deal with his Danish counterpart Troels Lund Poulsen, which aims to strengthen the two countries' strategic and operative cooperation when it comes to training of personnel, operations and maintenance.

Sandvik visited Ukraine for the first time in late June and met with President Volodymyr Zelenskyy to sign a cooperation agreement which sought for Norwegian weapons manufacturer Kongsberg Gruppen to establish offices in the country. He also made a visit to a memorial of fallen soldiers at the Freedom Square.

In August, the government announced that they would be purchasing new British made BAE Systems frigates to be used by the Norwegian Navy. The move was criticised by the Red and Socialist Left parties due to Israeli made components, while Sandvik responded saying that the government would not ask for the components to be replaced and they will be bought as is. He further said that the government was purchasing the frigates and not individual components.

Upon revelations that the Norwegian Army had continued to deny conscription for youth of minority backgrounds from high security risk countries in September, Sandvik faced criticism from Ine Eriksen Søreide, the chair of the Standing Committee on Foreign Affairs and Defence, for inaction on the matter despite previous pledges by his predecessor to tackle the issue. In response, Sandvik said that he was monitoring the situation closely and that he had asked the Army to provide him with a status update on the matter. He also emphasised the importance of a robust conscription system and supported his predecessor's testimony from January with the Intelligence Oversight Committee. Army interest groups on the hand called for the matter to be brought up in the Standing Committee on Scrutiny and Constitutional Affairs.

He announced in November that the government would expedite weapon deliveries to Ukraine by Christmas, with 11 trillion NOK of the allocated budget going to get new air defence and artillery weapons. Sandvik described the situation as "precarious" and "critical" for Ukraine, and furthermore denied that the expedite of deliveries had anything to do with the ongoing corruption scandal in the Ukrainian government. He explained that the government had planned the expedition long beforehand.

==== 2026 ====
Sandvik confirmed in January 2026 that the Norwegian Army would be deploying two military personnel to Greenland, stating that it was done to "strengthen Arctic security" and "map out continued cooperation between allies".

Following a diplomatic squabble between Norway and Malaysia over the last-minute cancellation of a defence agreement between the countries, Sandvik attended the Shangri-La Dialogue conference in May and met with his Malaysian counterpart Mohamed Khaled Nordin. He expressed understanding for Malaysia's reaction and emphasised the importance of continued dialogue between their countries.

In November, Sandvik visited the British aircraft carrier HMS Prince of Wales when it was visiting Oslo. He hailed Norwegian efforts in developments of drone technology and emphasised how they wanted to develop cooperation with the United Kingdom and Canada on artificial intelligence, citing how they were "well ahead in this field".

== Personal life ==
Sandvik grew up in the borough of Kolstad in Trondheim. He is married to Trine Brænden and has four children, two of whom are from a previous relationship.

Political offices
Preceded by Arnt Frøseth	County mayor of Sør-Trøndelag; 2003–2017	Office abolished
New office	County mayor of Trøndelag; 2018–2023	Succeeded by Tomas Iver Hallem
Preceded by Bjørn Arild Gram	Minister of Defence; 2025–present	Incumbent
