= Asbjørn Mathisen =

Norwegian politician and civil servant

- Born: 17 October 1942 (age 83)
- Occupation: Politician

Asbjørn Mathisen (born 17 October 1942) is a Norwegian politician and civil servant.

He was elected deputy representative to the Storting for the periods 1965–1969 and 1969–1973 for the Labour Party. He replaced Johan Støa at the Storting after Støa's death in September 1973. From 1992 to 1996 he served as state secretary in the Ministry of Foreign Affairs.
