= Mats Henriksen =

Norwegian politician (born 1998)

Member of the Storting
- Incumbent
- Assumed office 1 October 2025
- Constituency: Nord-Trøndelag

Personal details
- Born: 2 July 1998 (age 27)
- Party: Progress Party

Mats Henriksen (born 2 July 1998) is a Norwegian politician who was elected member of the Storting in 2025. He is a member of the county council of Trøndelag.
