= Elin Rodum Agdestein =

Norwegian politician (born 1957)

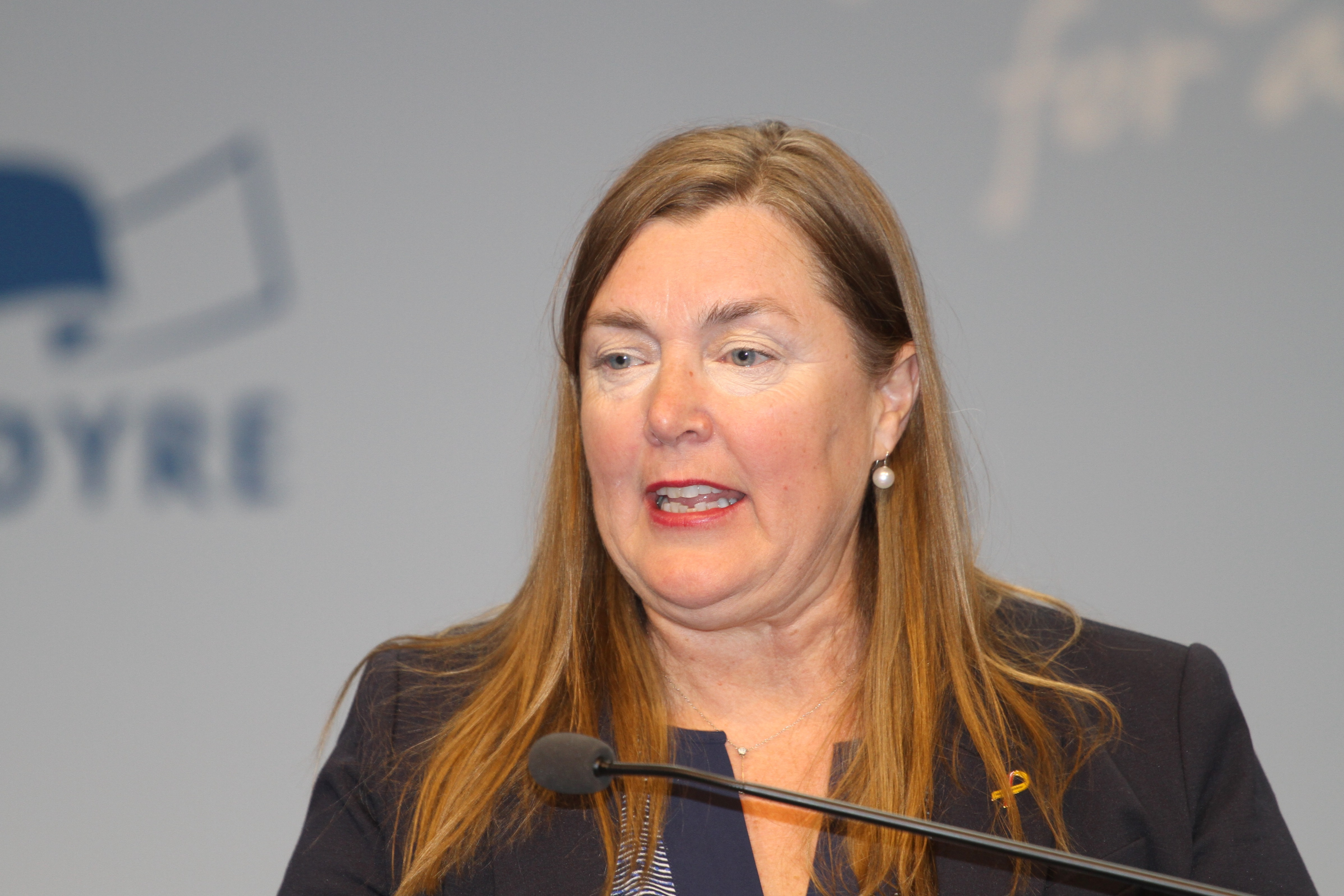
- Born: 10 August 1957 (age 69); Steinkjer, Norway
- Occupation: Politician
- Known for: Member of the Storting

Elin Rodum Agdestein (born 10 August 1957) is a Norwegian politician for the Conservative Party. She was elected to the Parliament of Norway from Nord-Trøndelag in 2013 where she is member of the Standing Committee on Foreign Affairs and Defence.
