= Roger Gudmundseth =

Norwegian politician

Roger Gudmundseth (born 15 June 1938) is a Norwegian politician for the Labour Party.

He was born in Ålesund as a son of shipmaster Randulv Gudmundseth (1906 Tokyo–1972) and housewife Jenny Rasmussen (1910–1989). He worked as a fisher from 1954 to 1957, before attending commerce school and insurance school. He worked in Samvirke forsikring from 1963 to 1973, in Fiskernes gjensidige ulykkestrygdelag from 1973 to 1981 and as an office manager in Norges Fiskarlag from 1979 to 1981.

On the local level he was a deputy member of Ålesund city council from 1967 to 1970 and of the executive committee of the municipal council of Stjørdal Municipality from 1975 to 1979. He chaired the local party chapter from 1979 to 1982. He was elected to the Parliament of Norway from Nord-Trøndelag in 1981, and was re-elected on three occasions, his last term ending in 1997. Among others, he became known for a suggestion to replace Norway's 19 counties with 5 administrative regions.

Gudmundseth was a board member of Norges Fiskarlags Pensjonskasse 1979–1983, and was also involved in his trade union Union of Employees in Commerce and Offices and the N findorwegian Heart and Lung Patient Organisation. He now lives in Ålesund. He is the father of Merethe Storødegård.
