= Terje Sørvik =

Norwegian politician (born 1967)

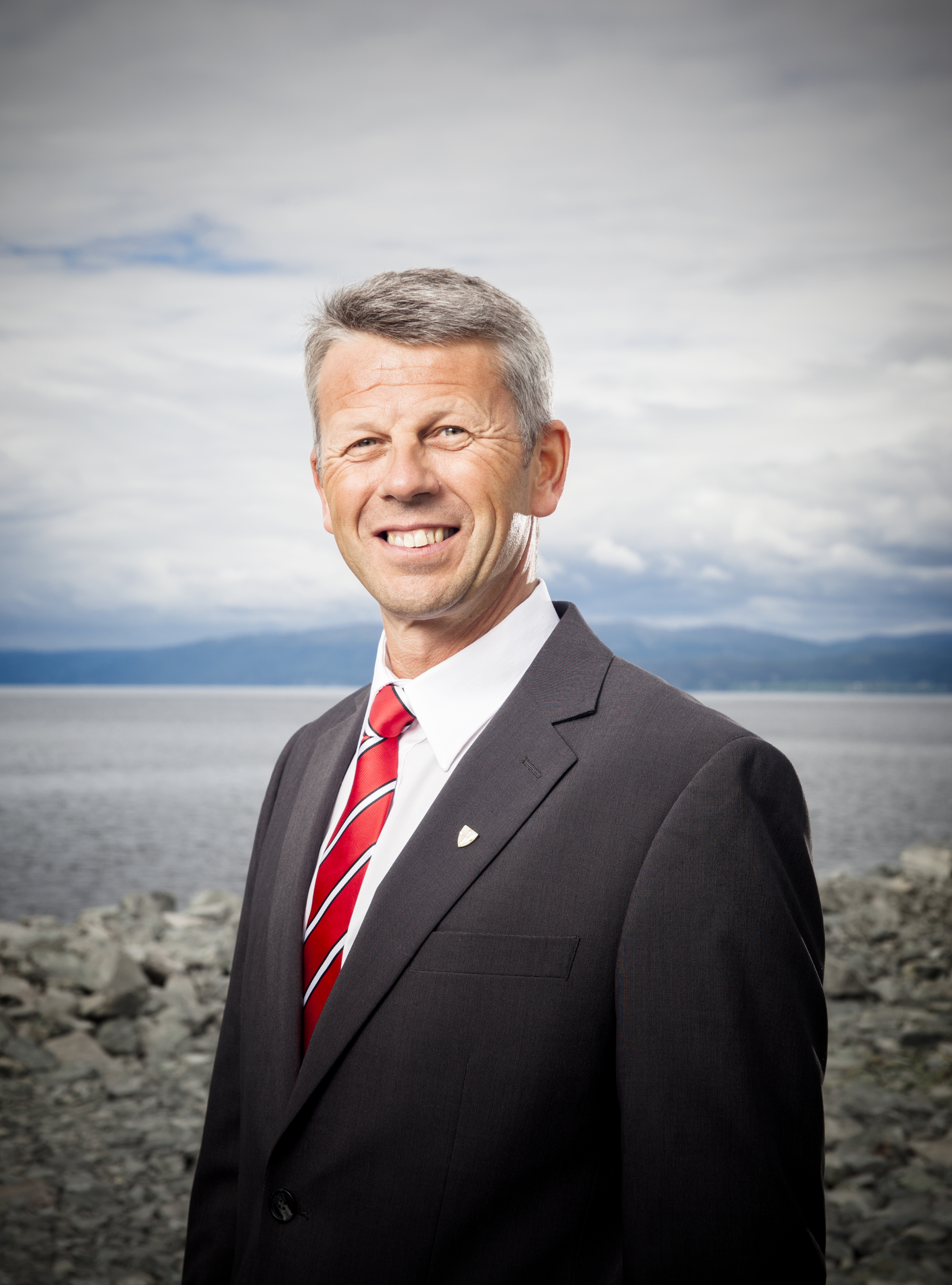
- Born: 4 June 1967 (age 58); Vikna Municipality, Norway
- Occupation: Politician
- Political party: Labour Party

Terje Sørvik (born 4 June 1967) is a Norwegian politician. He has been a member of the Storting since 2021, representing the Labour Party.

== Career ==
Born in Vikna Municipality on 4 June 1967, Sørvik was trained as a welder, and worked for the company Moen Slip from 1985 to 2009.

He was elected representative to the Storting from the constituency of Nord-Trøndelag for the period 2021–2025, for the Labour Party. He was deputy representative to the Storting for the periods 2009–2013 and 2013–2017.
