= Johnny Stenberg =

Norwegian politician

Johnny Stenberg (born 3 January 1925 in Eigersund Municipality, died 17 March 1990) was a Norwegian politician for the Labour Party.

He was elected to the Norwegian Parliament from Nord-Trøndelag in 1973, and was re-elected on one occasion. He had previously served as a deputy representative during the term 1969–1973.

On the local level he was a member of the municipal council from Meråker Municipality from 1959 to 1975, serving as deputy mayor in 1963–1965 and 1973–1975 and mayor from 1966 to 1973.

Outside politics he spent large parts of his career in the Norwegian State Railways, like his father.
