= Johan Wiik =

Norwegian politician

Johan Wiik (8 March 1885 – 3 October 1970) was a Norwegian politician for the Labour Party.

He was born in Fosnes Municipality.

He was elected to the Norwegian Parliament from Nord-Trøndelag in 1928, and was re-elected on six occasions.

Wiik was deputy mayor of Namsos Municipality from 1925–1926 and mayor in 1927–1928.
