= Bente Estil =

Norwegian politician

Member of the Storting
- Incumbent
- Assumed office 1 October 2025
- Constituency: Nord-Trøndelag

Personal details
- Born: 15 July 1970 (age 55)
- Party: Labour

Bente Estil (born 15 July 1970) is a Norwegian politician from the Labour Party (Ap). She was mayor of Lierne Municipality from 2015 to 2021.

== Career ==
She was elected to the Storting in the 2025 Norwegian parliamentary election.

== See also ==
- List of members of the Storting, 2025–2029
