= Oda Indgaard =

Norwegian politician (born 1987)

Member of the Storting
- Incumbent
- Assumed office 1 October 2025
- Constituency: Nord-Trøndelag

Personal details
- Born: 12 March 1987 (age 39)
- Party: Green Party

Oda Indgaard (born 12 March 1987) is a Norwegian politician who was elected member of the Storting in 2025. She has served as chairwoman of the Green Party in Østensjø since 2022.
