= Arne Lyngstad =

Norwegian politician (1962–2019)

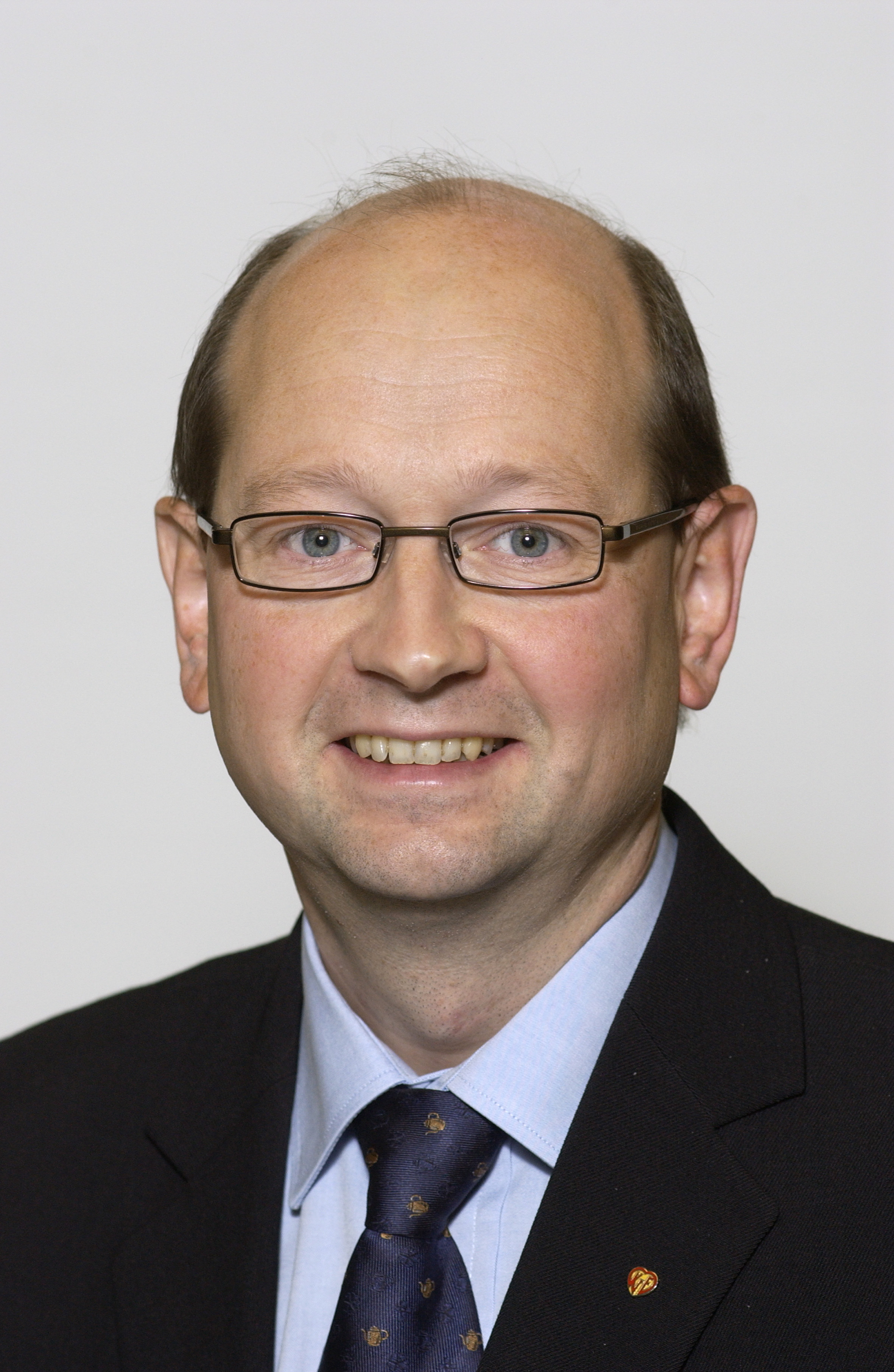

Arne Lyngstad (10 May 1962 – 30 May 2019) was a Norwegian politician for the Christian Democratic Party.

Lyngstad was born in Verdal Municipality. He was elected to the Norwegian Parliament from Nord-Trøndelag in 1997, and was re-elected on one occasion.

Lyngstad was a deputy member of the municipal council for Verdal Municipality in 1983–1987, of Nord-Trøndelag county council in 1987–1991 and of the municipal council of Trondheim Municipality in 1991–1995.
