= Gunvald Engelstad =

Norwegian politician (1900-1972)

Gunvald Engelstad (10 May 1900 – 18 September 1972) was a Norwegian politician for the Labour Party.

He was born in Øksendal Municipality. After working on a farm from 1915 to 1916, he took a smith's education from 1917 to 1920. He worked as a smith from 1920; at Follafoss Tresliperi from 1925. He was involved in the local trade unions, and was active in politics. He was a member of the municipal council of Verran Municipality from 1925 to 1928, chaired the local party chapter from 1931 to 1934 and later served as mayor from 1934. He was also a member of the local school board, the forestry board and various committees. He lost all his positions following the Nazi German invasion of Norway in 1940, only returning as mayor for some months in 1945. He was even imprisoned, in Falstad concentration camp from November 1943 to September 1944, then in Vollan concentration camp for three days, then in Grini concentration camp until the end of World War II.

Engelstad was elected to the Parliament of Norway from Nord-Trøndelag in 1945, and was re-elected on four occasions. He had previously served as a deputy representative from 1937–1945.
