= Aud Gaundal =

Norwegian politician

Aud Gaundal (born 10 November 1949 in Inderøy Municipality) is a Norwegian politician for the Labour Party.

She was elected to the Norwegian Parliament from Nord-Trøndelag in 1993, and was re-elected on two occasions. She had previously served in the position of deputy representative during the terms 1981–1985, 1985–1989 and 1989–1993.

Gaundal was a member of the executive committee of the municipal council of Steinkjer Municipality from 1979 to 1993. After the 2007 election she became Deputy Mayor of Steinkjer.
