= Gunnar Vada =

Norwegian politician

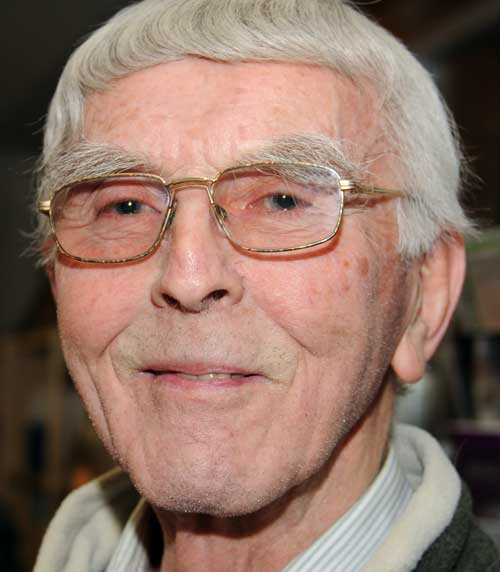
- Vada in 2011

Politician for the Conservative Party

Personal details
- Born: March 16, 1927 Beitstad, Norway
- Died: June 14, 2018 (aged 91) Beitstad, Norway
- Party: Conservative Party (Norway)
- Profession: Politician

Gunnar Vada (16 March 1927 – 14 June 2018) was a Norwegian politician for the Conservative Party.

== Life and career ==
Gunnar Vada was born in Beitstad on 16 March 1927.

Vada was elected to the Norwegian Parliament from Nord-Trøndelag in 1977, and was re-elected on one occasion. He served as a deputy representative during the terms 1973–1977 and 1985–1989. From 1985 to 1986 he met as a regular representative, filling in for Wenche Frogn Sellæg who was appointed to the second cabinet Willoch.

On the local level he was a member of Nord-Trøndelag county council from 1975 to 1979. He chaired the local party chapter from 1972 to 1974, and was deputy leader of the county chapter from 1970 to 1975.

Gunnar Vada died in Beitstad on 14 June 2018, at the age of 91.

== Sources ==
- "Gunnar Vada" (in Norwegian). Storting.
