= Vebjørn Gorseth =

Norwegian politician (born 1994)

Member of the Storting
- Incumbent
- Assumed office 1 October 2025
- Constituency: Nord-Trøndelag

Personal details
- Born: 23 April 1994 (age 31)
- Party: Labour Party

Vebjørn Gorseth (born 23 April 1994) is a Norwegian politician who was elected member of the Storting in 2025. He is the group leader of the Labour Party in the municipal council of Steinkjer.
