= Arild Stokkan-Grande =

Norwegian politician

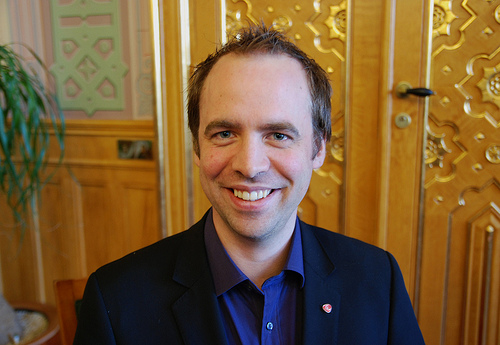
Arild Stokkan-Grande

Arild Stokkan-Grande (born 5 April 1978 in Trondheim) is a Norwegian politician for the Labour Party (AP). He represents Nord-Trøndelag in the Norwegian Parliament, where he meets in the place of Bjarne Håkon Hanssen, who was appointed to a government position.

== Parliamentary Committee duties ==
- 2005 - 2009 member of the Standing Committee on Local Government and Public Administration.
