= Heimdal Upper Secondary School =

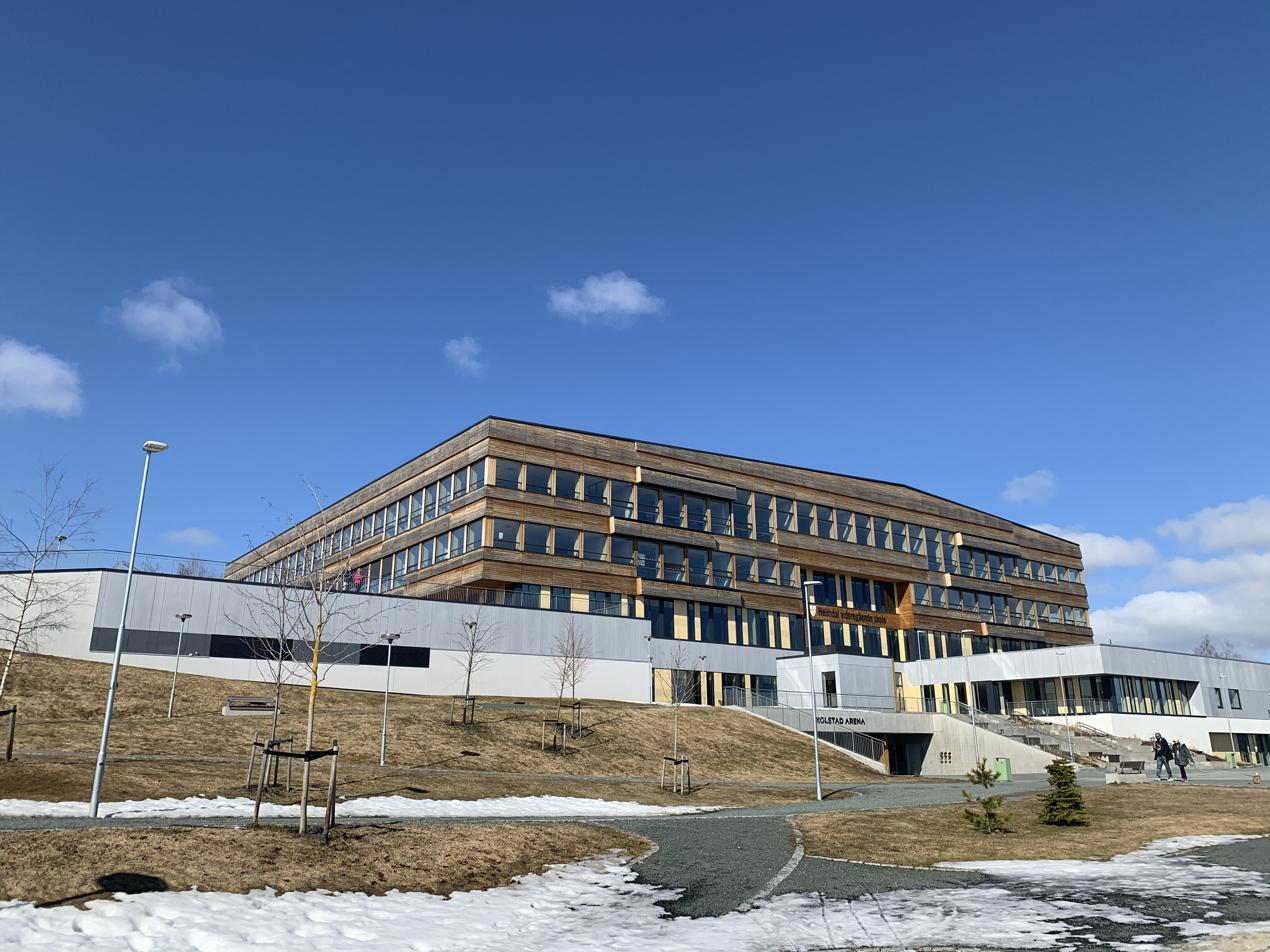
- Heimdal VGS and Kolstad Arena

Location
- Trondheim, Trøndelag; Norway; 63°21′54″N 10°21′06″E

Information
- Head teacher: Hanne Mari Sæther
- Staff: 200
- Enrolment: 920
- Website: https://web.trondelagfylke.no/heimdal-videregaende-skole

Heimdal Upper Secondary School (Norwegian: Heimdal videregående skole) is one of the largest upper secondary schools in the county of Trøndelag, Norway. It is located about 10 km (6 mi) south of the city centre of Trondheim. The school has approximately 920 students, 200 employees and the current headmaster is Hanne Mari Sæther.

== History ==
During the 1970s the city of Trondheim was growing, and since Heimdal was growing relatively fast, it was selected to be the place of a new Upper Secondary School. The school opened 1 August 1977, with 434 students enroling that year, but in the few years following the school quickly grew to accommodate approximately 700 students. During the 1980s the amount of enrolled students grew even further to a peak of over 900 students in 1985/1986, which Heimdal Upper Secondary School could not easliy support. This perssure was aliviated when Tiller Upper Secondary School was opened. In 2013 Sør-Trøndelag County Municipality adopted the building of a new Heimdal Upper secondary School.

== New school building ==
The new building has a floor plan with a size of approximately 30,000 m² and can house 1140 students. The new school was finished in 2018.

== Educational programmes ==
Heimdal Upper Secondary School offers the following educational programmes:

- Electrical and Computer Technology
- Health and Childhood Subjects
- Sports
- Music, Dance and Drama
- Study Specialisation
