= André N. Skjelstad =

Norwegian politician (born 1965)

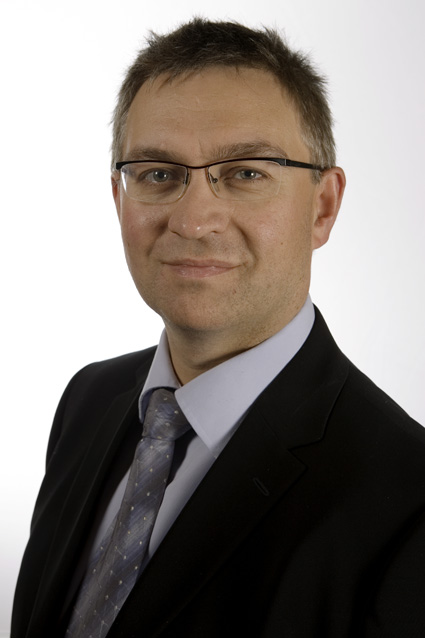
Andre Nikolai Skjelstad

André Nikolai Skjelstad (born 27 August 1965) is a Norwegian politician for the Liberal Party.

He was elected to the Norwegian Parliament from Nord-Trøndelag in 2005. Prior to this he worked as a farmer, and served as Deputy Mayor of Verran Municipality and as a regional council member for Nord-Trøndelag County Municipality. Skjelstad has argued for diversification and investment in the region, to prevent stagnation and reliance upon the oil industry.
