= Per Aunet =

Norwegian politician (born 1940)

Member of the Norwegian Parliament for Nord-Trøndelag
- In office 1989–1993

Personal details
- Born: 14 April 1940 (age 86) Stjørdal Municipality, Norway
- Party: Socialist Left Party
- Education: University of Bergen
- Occupation: Associate Professor
- Profession: Biologist

Per Aunet (born 14 April 1940, in Stjørdal Municipality) is a Norwegian politician for the Socialist Left Party, an environmentalist in the Norwegian Society for the Conservation of Nature (NNV) and an associate professor in biology at Nord-Trøndelag University College.

== History ==
He was elected to the Norwegian Parliament from Nord-Trøndelag in 1989, but was not re-elected in 1993. Aunet was a member of the municipal council for Levanger Municipality in the periods 1975–1979, 1979–1983, 1987–1989 and 1995–1999. He chaired the local party chapter from 1984 to 1987 and from 1997 to 1999. He was deputy chairman of NNV from 1995 to 1997.

In his younger days, he was an athlete who specialized in the 400 metres hurdles. He won silver medals at the Norwegian championships in 1962 and 1968, representing the clubs IL Stjørdals-Blink and Tingvoll IL. His career-best time was 53.1 seconds, achieved in August 1968 at Bislett stadion.
