= Johan Støa (politician) =

Norwegian politician

Johan Støa (20 February 1913 – 24 September 1973) was a Norwegian politician for the Labour Party.

He was elected to the Norwegian Parliament from Nord-Trøndelag in 1965, and was re-elected on two occasions. Shortly into his third term, he died and was replaced by Asbjørn Mathisen.

Støa was born in Verdal Municipality and involved in local politics in Verdal Municipality from 1947 to 1965, serving as mayor in 1961–1963 and 1963–1965. He was also a member of Nord-Trøndelag county council in the period 1961–1963.
