= Transportation authority =

Government agency responsible for transportation-related matters

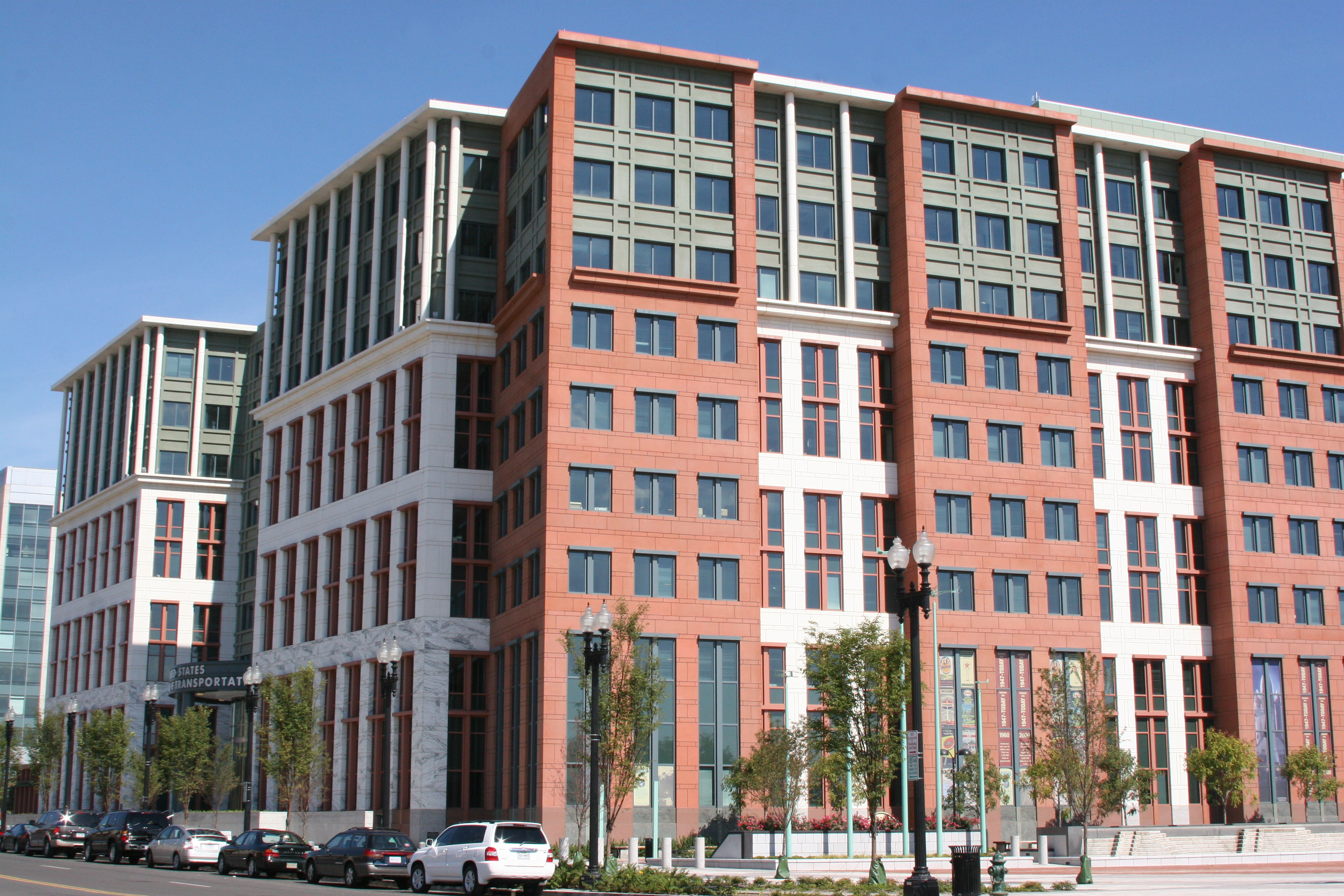
Headquarters of the United States Department of Transportation

A transportation authority, transportation agency, or transportation department is a government agency that regulates, manages, or administers transportation-related matters, such as roads, transportation infrastructure, traffic management, or traffic code.

Transportation authorities go by a number of names, such as "department of transportation" or "ministry of transport", among others. They often manage other government agencies that oversee specific fields of transportation, such as civil aviation authorities, highway authorities, logistics regulators, rail transport regulators, maritime transport regulators, and transportation safety boards.

Some transportation authorities, such as Greater Vancouver's TransLink, have the power to impose excise taxes (fuel taxes) on gasoline, diesel fuel, and other motor fuels.

In North America, the term "transportation authority" is often used to refer to public transport agencies operating buses and rapid transit in metropolitan areas, otherwise referred to as transit districts or passenger transport executives. Examples of such public transport authorities (or public transit authorities) include the New York Metropolitan Transportation Authority, the Los Angeles County Metropolitan Transportation Authority, and Greater Montreal’s Autorité régionale de transport métropolitain.
