= Byåsen Upper Secondary School =

Location
- Trondheim, Trondelag; Norway
- Coordinates: 63°23′43″N 10°21′55″E

Information
- Founded: 2004
- Head teacher: Frode Øren
- Enrolment: 841
- Website: https://web.trondelagfylke.no/byasen-videregaende-skole/

Byåsen Upper Secondary School (Norwegian: Byåsen videregående skole) is a public upper secondary school located in the Byåsen area of Trondheim, Norway. The current head teacher is Frode Øren

The school was founded in 2004, and is built on a site that was previously home to military barracks and storage buildings. In addition to the school, the building also contains a public library and a gym. The school had in 2025/2026 an enrollment of 841 pupils

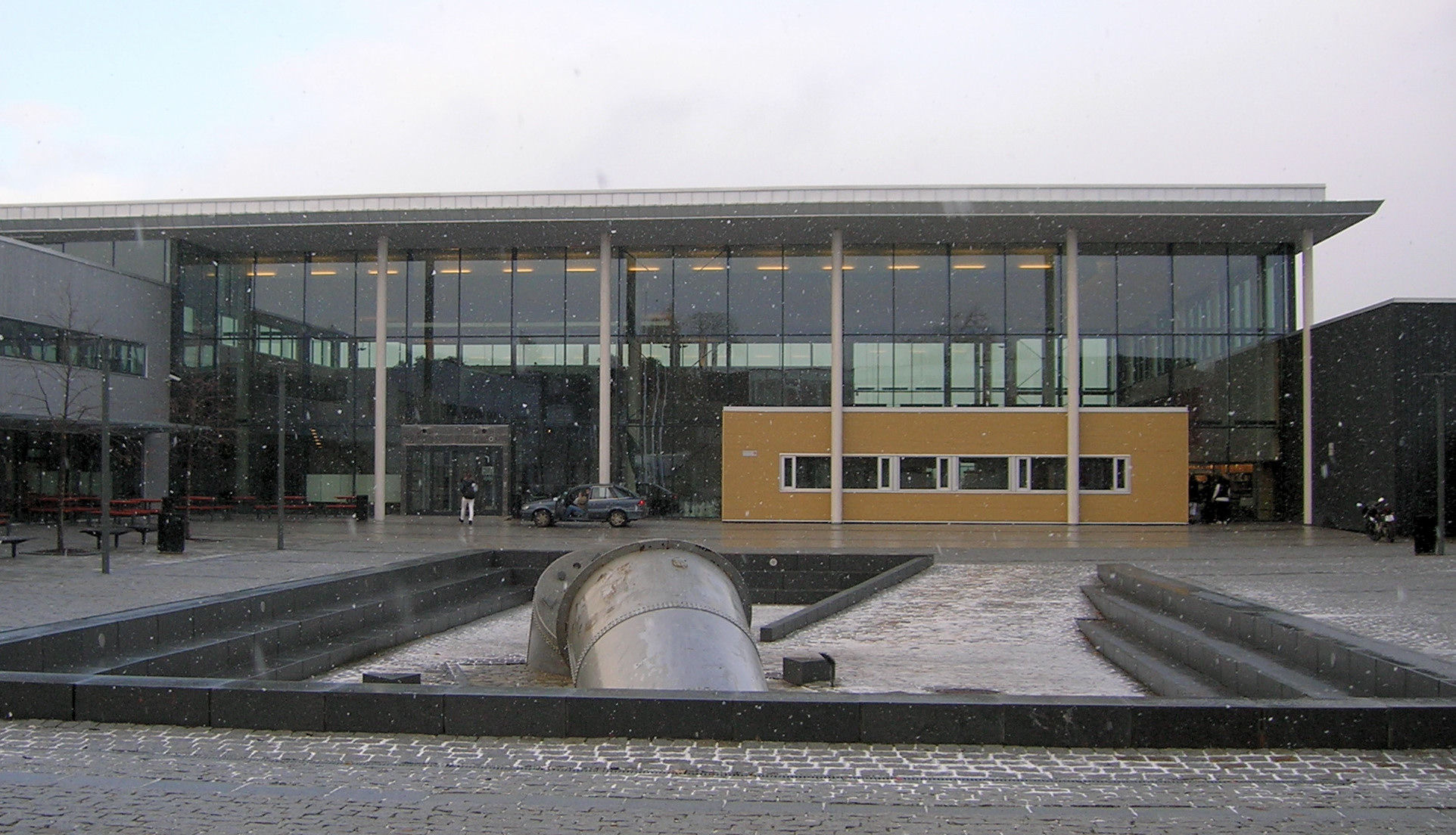

== Educational programmes ==
Bysåsen Upper Secondary School offers the following educational programmes

- Media and Communication
- Study Specialization
- Health and Childhood Subjects
- Restaurant and Food Subjects
- Technology and Industrial Arts
