= Charlottenlund Upper Secondary School =

- Charlottenlund videregående skole

Location
- Trondheim; Norway
- Coordinates: 63°25′14″N 10°29′11″E

Information
- Former name: Brundalen VGS
- Established: 1970
- Authority: Trondelag Fylke
- Head teacher: Marit Flak Stovner
- Staff: 250
- Enrollment: 1,119
- Language: Norwegian
- Affiliation: Public
- Website: https://web.trondelagfylke.no/charlottenlund-videregaende-skole

Charlottenlund Upper Secondary School (Norwegian: Charlottenlund videregående skole) is the largest upper secondary school in the Jakobsli area of Trondheim, county of Trondelag in Norway. It is located about 4 km east of Trondheim city centre. The school has 1119 students, approximately 250 employees and the current headmaster is Marit Flak Stovner.

The school was originally formed in 1970 as Brundalen Upper Secondary School, but the history of the school can be traced back as far as 1883. In 2002, Brunsdalen Upper Secondary School was merged with Charlottenlund Upper Secondary School, which initially retained the name Brunsdalen Upper Secondary School. The school subsequently changed its name to Charlottenlund Upper Secondary School in 2010. In 2012, the school moved into a new building near the old school (built 2011). The old school was demolished soon after.

== Educational programmes ==
Charlottenlund Upper Secondary School offers the following prgrammes:

- Study Specialisation
- Media and Communication
- Art, Design and Architecture
- Buildings and Building Technology
- Hair, Interior and Flower Design
- Information Technology and Media Production
- Sales, Service and Travel
- Technology and Industrial Arts
- Craftsmanship, Design and Product Development

In addition to the educational programmes the school runs The Norwegian Correctional Service's educational programmes for Trondheim Prison, and the adult education under the auspices of Trondheim Voksenopplæringssenter - TORVO.

== Alumni ==
- Øystein Djupedal, politician
