= Nordli cabinet =

Government of Norway from 1976 to 1981

Nordli's Cabinet
- Cabinet of Norway

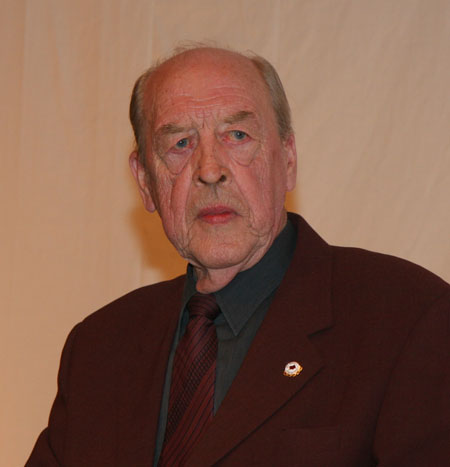
- Date formed: 15 January 1976
- Date dissolved: 4 February 1981

People and organisations
- King: Olav V of Norway
- Prime Minister: Odvar Nordli
- Ministers removed: 18
- Total no. of members: 35
- Member party: Labour Party
- Status in legislature: Minority government

History
- Election: 1977 parliamentary election
- Legislature terms: 1973–1977; 1977–1981
- Predecessor: Bratteli's Second Cabinet
- Successor: Brundtland's First Cabinet

Nordli's Cabinet governed Norway between 15 January 1976 and 4 February 1981. The Labour Party cabinet was led by Odvar Nordli. It had the following composition:

== Cabinet members (Note: Unless otherwise noted, the period was from 15 January 1976 - 4 February 1981.) ==
Cabinet
Portfolio	Minister	Took office	Left office	Party
Prime Minister	Odvar Nordli	15 January 1976	4 February 1981	Labour
Minister of Foreign Affairs	Knut Frydenlund	15 January 1976	4 February 1981	Labour
Minister of Finance and Customs	Per Kleppe	15 January 1976	8 October 1979	Labour
Minister of Finance and Customs	Ulf Sand	8 October 1979	4 February 1981	Labour
Minister of Defence	Rolf A. Hansen	15 January 1976	8 October 1979	Labour
Minister of Defence	Thorvald Stoltenberg	8 October 1979	4 February 1981	Labour
Minister of Justice and the Police	Inger Louise Valle	15 January 1976	8 October 1979	Labour
Minister of Justice and the Police	Andreas Z. Cappelen	8 October 1979	3 October 1980	Labour
Minister of Justice and the Police	Oddvar Berrefjord	3 October 1980	4 February 1981	Labour
Minister of Transport and Communications	Ragnar Christiansen	15 January 1976	11 January 1978	Labour
Minister of Transport and Communications	Asbjørn Jordahl	11 January 1978	8 October 1979	Labour
Minister of Transport and Communications	Ronald Bye	8 October 1979	4 February 1981	Labour
Minister of Local Government and Labour	Leif Jørgen Aune	15 January 1976	11 January 1978	Labour
Minister of Local Government and Labour	Arne Nilsen	11 January 1978	8 October 1979	Labour
Minister of Local Government and Labour	Inger Louise Valle	8 October 1979	3 October 1980	Labour
Minister of Local Government and Labour	Harriet Andreassen	3 October 1980	4 February 1981	Labour
Minister of Education and Church Affairs	Kjølv Egeland	15 January 1976	8 October 1979	Labour
Minister of Education and Church Affairs	Einar Førde	8 October 1979	4 February 1981	Labour
Minister of Social Affairs	Ruth Ryste	15 January 1976	8 October 1979	Labour
Minister of Social Affairs	Arne Nilsen	8 October 1979	4 February 1981	Labour
Minister of Family Affairs and Government Administration	Annemarie Lorentzen	15 January 1976	11 January 1978	Labour
Minister of Family Affairs and Government Administration	Kirsten Myklevoll	11 January 1978	8 October 1979	Labour
Minister of Family Affairs and Government Administration	Sissel Rønbeck	8 October 1979	4 February 1981	Labour
Minister of Agriculture	Oskar Øksnes	15 January 1976	4 February 1981	Labour
Minister of Industry	Bjartmar Gjerde	15 January 1976	11 January 1978	Labour
Minister of Industry	Olav Haukvik	11 January 1978	8 October 1979	Labour
Minister of Industry	Lars Skytøen	8 October 1979	4 February 1981	Labour
Minister of Trade and Shipping	Hallvard Bakke	15 January 1976	8 October 1979	Labour
Minister of Trade and Shipping	Reiulf Steen	8 October 1979	4 February 1981	Labour
Minister of the Environment	Gro Harlem Brundtland	15 January 1976	8 October 1979	Labour
Minister of the Environment	Rolf A. Hansen	8 October 1979	4 February 1981	Labour
Minister of Petroleum and Energy	Bjartmar Gjerde	11 January 1978	3 October 1980	Labour
Minister of Petroleum and Energy	Arvid Johanson	3 October 1980	4 February 1981	Labour
Minister of Fisheries	Eivind Bolle	15 January 1976	4 February 1981	Labour
Minister of Maritime Law (Note: The post of Maritime Law minister was one without a portfolio.)	Jens Evensen	15 January 1976	31 December 1978	Labour

== Bibliography ==
- "Odvar Nordlis regjering. 15. januar 1976 – 4. februar 1981" (in Norwegian). Regjeringen.no.
