= Minister of Finance (Norway) =

Norwegian cabinet position

The Minister of Finance is a councilor of state and chief of the Ministry of Finance. The position is since February 2025 held by Jens Stoltenberg of the Labour Party (Norway) who is a member of Støre's Cabinet. In coalition governments, the leader of the largest junior party is usually made Minister of Finance, and may serve, de jure or de facto, as Deputy Prime Minister.

Norwegian Ministers of Finance after 1945

== List of ministers ==
=== Key ===
Conservative Party
Agrarian / Centre Party
Labour Party
Socialist Left Party
Liberal Party
Progress Party
Free-minded Liberal Party
Moderate Liberal Party
Coalition Party
Resistance Movement
Independent

=== 1st Ministry (finance affairs) (March–November 1814) ===
Photo	Name	Party	Took office	Left office	Tenure	Cabinet
	Frederik von Haxthausen	Independent	2 March 1814	20 August 1814	171 days	Council of 1814
	Carsten Tank	Independent	2 March 1814	27 July 1814	147 days	Council of 1814
	Poul Christian Holst	Independent	20 August 1814	7 October 1814	48 days	Council of 1814
	Jørgen Herman Vogt	Independent	7 October 1814	18 November 1814	42 days	Council of 1814

=== 5th Ministry (finance affairs) (November 1814–1818) ===
Photo	Name	Party	Took office	Left office	Tenure	Cabinet
	Herman Wedel Jarlsberg	Independent	18 November 1814	15 August 1816	1 year, 272 days	Wedel I
	Christian Krohg	Independent	15 August 1816	15 October 1816	60 days	Wedel I
	Herman Wedel Jarlsberg	Independent	15 October 1816	15 October 1818	2 years, 0 days	Wedel I

=== Ministry of Finance, Trade and Customs (1818–1846) ===
Photo	Name	Party	Took office	Left office	Tenure	Cabinet
	Jonas Collett	Independent	15 October 1818	30 November 1818	46 days	Wedel I
	Herman Wedel Jarlsberg	Independent	30 November 1818	1 January 1822	3 years, 32 days	Wedel I
	Jonas Collett	Independent	1 January 1822	17 December 1836	14 years, 351 days	Wedel I-II
	Jørgen Herman Vogt	Independent	17 December 1836	15 May 1846	9 years, 149 days	Wedel II; Løvenskiold/Vogt

=== Ministry of Finance and Customs (1846–2000) ===
Photo	Name	Party	Took office	Left office	Tenure	Cabinet
	Olaus Michael Schmidt	Independent	15 May 1846	15 July 1847	1 year, 61 days	Løvenskiold/Vogt
	Jørgen Herman Vogt	Independent	15 July 1847	29 August 1849	2 years, 45 days	Løvenskiold/Vogt
	Valentin Sibbern	Independent	29 August 1849	30 April 1850	244 days	Løvenskiold/Vogt
	Christian Z. Bretteville	Independent	30 April 1850	10 July 1852	2 years, 71 days	Løvenskiold/Vogt
	Niels Andreas Thrap	Independent	10 July 1852	20 September 1852	72 days	Løvenskiold/Vogt
	Jørgen Herman Vogt	Independent	20 September 1852	29 June 1853	282 days	Løvenskiold/Vogt
	Hans Riddervold	Independent	29 June 1853	5 August 1853	37 days	Løvenskiold/Vogt
	Jørgen Herman Vogt	Independent	5 August 1853	9 September 1853	35 days	Løvenskiold/Vogt
	Christian Z. Bretteville	Independent	9 September 1853	22 March 1854	194 days	Løvenskiold/Vogt
	Niels Andreas Thrap	Independent	22 March 1854	2 July 1854	102 days	Løvenskiold/Vogt
	Jørgen Herman Vogt	Independent	2 July 1854	27 September 1855	1 year, 87 days	Løvenskiold/Vogt
	Otto Vincent Lange	Independent	27 September 1855	26 June 1856	273 days	Løvenskiold/Vogt; Vogt
	Erik Røring Møinichen	Independent	26 June 1856	11 August 1857	1 year, 46 days	Vogt
	Otto Vincent Lange	Independent	11 August 1857	15 September 1858	1 year, 35 days	Vogt
	Erik Røring Møinichen	Independent	15 September 1858	15 October 1859	1 year, 30 days	Vogt; Sibbern/Birch/Motzfeldt
	Otto Vincent Lange	Independent	15 October 1859	15 September 1861	1 year, 335 days	Sibbern/Birch/Motzfeldt
	Erik Røring Møinichen	Independent	15 September 1861	15 September 1862	1 year, 0 days	Sibbern/Birch/Motzfeldt; F. Stang
	Otto Vincent Lange	Independent	15 September 1862	22 June 1863	280 days	F. Stang
	Henrik L. Helliesen	Independent	22 June 1863	15 October 1865	2 years, 115 days	F. Stang
	Erik Røring Møinichen	Independent	15 October 1865	15 October 1866	1 year, 0 days	F. Stang
	Henrik L. Helliesen	Independent	15 October 1866	15 October 1869	3 years, 0 days	F. Stang
	Erik Røring Møinichen	Independent	15 October 1869	1 February 1870	109 days	F. Stang
	August Christian Manthey	Independent	2 February 1870	20 September 1870	230 days	F. Stang
	Henrik L. Helliesen	Independent	20 September 1870	6 July 1872	1 year, 290 days	F. Stang
	August Christian Manthey	Independent	6 July 1872	15 June 1873	344 days	F. Stang
	Henrik L. Helliesen	Independent	15 June 1873	24 February 1874	254 days	F. Stang
	August Christian Manthey	Independent	24 February 1874	7 April 1874	42 days	F. Stang
	Henrik L. Helliesen	Independent	7 April 1874	26 May 1875	1 year, 49 days	F. Stang
	Jacob Aall jr.	Independent	26 May 1875	5 June 1875	10 days	F. Stang
	Henrik L. Helliesen	Independent	5 June 1875	6 July 1875	31 days	F. Stang
	Jacob Aall jr.	Independent	6 July 1875	21 July 1875	15 days	F. Stang
	Henrik L. Helliesen	Independent	21 July 1875	15 October 1875	86 days	F. Stang
	Jens Holmboe	Independent	15 October 1875	15 November 1876	1 year, 31 days	F. Stang
	Henrik L. Helliesen	Independent	15 November 1876	15 September 1879	2 years, 304 days	F. Stang
	Jens Holmboe	Independent	15 September 1879	15 September 1880	1 year, 0 days	F. Stang
	Henrik L. Helliesen	Independent	15 September 1880	15 September 1883	3 years, 0 days	F. Stang; Selmer
	Christian H. Schweigaard	Independent	15 September 1883	3 April 1884	201 days	Selmer
	Herman Reimers	Independent	3 April 1884	26 June 1884	84 days	Schweigaard
	Baard M. Haugland	Liberal	26 June 1884	16 July 1888	4 years, 20 days	Sverdrup
	Olaj Johan Olsen	Liberal	16 July 1888	1 May 1889	289 days	Sverdrup
	Peter Olrog Schjøtt	Liberal	1 May 1889	8 July 1889	68 days	Sverdrup
	Olaj Johan Olsen	Liberal	8 July 1889	13 July 1889	5 days	Sverdrup
	Evald Rygh	Conservative	13 July 1889	6 March 1891	1 year, 236 days	Stang I
	Johannes Steen	Liberal	6 March 1891	2 May 1893	2 years, 57 days	Steen I
	Ole Furu	Conservative	2 May 1893	9 August 1895	2 years, 99 days	Stang II
	Francis Hagerup	Conservative	9 August 1895	14 October 1895	66 days	Stang II
	Fredrik Stang Lund	Liberal	14 October 1895	15 November 1895	32 days	Hagerup I
	Birger Kildal	Liberal	15 November 1895	17 February 1898	2 years, 94 days	Hagerup I
	Elias Sunde	Liberal	17 February 1898	19 May 1900	2 years, 91 days	Steen II
	Georg August Thilesen	Liberal	19 May 1900	6 November 1900	171 days	Steen II
	Søren Tobias Årstad	Liberal	6 November 1900	8 June 1901	214 days	Steen II
	Elias Sunde	Liberal	8 June 1901	9 June 1903	2 years, 1 day	Steen II; Blehr I
	Gunnar Knudsen	Liberal	9 June 1903	22 October 1903	135 days	Blehr I
	Birger Kildal	Liberal	22 October 1903	1 September 1904	315 days	Hagerup II
	Christian Michelsen	Coalition	1 September 1904	11 March 1905	191 days	Hagerup II
	Gunnar Knudsen	Liberal	11 March 1905	31 October 1905	234 days	Michelsen
	Christian Michelsen	Coalition	31 October 1905	27 November 1905	27 days	Michelsen
	Edvard H. Bull	Conservative	27 November 1905	7 November 1906	345 days	Michelsen
	Abraham Berge	Liberal	7 November 1906	23 October 1907	350 days	Michelsen
	Magnus Halvorsen	Moderate Liberal	23 October 1907	19 March 1908	148 days	Løvland
	Gunnar Knudsen	Liberal	19 March 1908	2 February 1910	1 year, 320 days	Knudsen I
	Abraham Berge	Free-minded Liberal	2 February 1910	20 February 1912	2 years, 18 days	Konow
	Fredrik Ludvig Konow	Free-minded Liberal	20 February 1912	31 January 1913	346 days	Bratlie
	Anton Omholt	Liberal	31 January 1913	16 June 1920	7 years, 137 days	Knudsen II
	Edvard H. Bull	Conservative	21 June 1920	22 June 1921	1 year, 1 day	Halvorsen I
	Otto Blehr	Liberal	22 June 1921	6 March 1923	1 year, 257 days	Blehr II
	Abraham Berge	Free-minded Liberal	6 March 1923	25 July 1924	1 year, 141 days	Halvorsen II; Berge
	Arnold Holmboe	Liberal	25 July 1924	5 March 1926	1 year, 223 days	Mowinckel I
	Fredrik Ludvig Konow	Free-minded Liberal	5 March 1926	28 January 1928	1 year, 329 days	Lykke
	Christopher Hornsrud	Labour	28 January 1928	15 February 1928	18 days	Hornsrud
	Per Berg Lund	Liberal	15 February 1928	12 May 1931	3 years, 86 days	Mowinckel II
	Peder Kolstad	Agrarian	12 May 1931	1 February 1932	265 days	Kolstad
	Jon Sundby	Agrarian	1 February 1932	3 March 1933	1 year, 30 days	Kolstad; Hundseid
	Per Berg Lund	Liberal	3 March 1933	3 November 1934	1 year, 245 days	Mowinckel III
	Gunnar Jahn	Liberal	3 November 1934	20 March 1935	137 days	Mowinckel III
	Adolf Indrebø	Labour	20 March 1935	13 November 1936	1 year, 238 days	Nygaardsvold
	Kornelius Bergsvik	Labour	13 November 1936	1 July 1939	2 years, 230 days	Nygaardsvold
	Oscar Torp	Labour	1 July 1939	28 November 1941	2 years, 150 days	Nygaardsvold
	Paul Hartmann	Resistance	28 November 1941	28 February 1942	92 days	Nygaardsvold
	Oscar Torp	Labour	28 February 1942	20 March 1942	20 days	Nygaardsvold
	Paul Hartmann	Resistance	20 March 1942	25 June 1945	3 years, 97 days	Nygaardsvold
	Gunnar Jahn	Resistance (Note: Though a member of the Liberal Party, Jahn represented the resistance movement while serving in the unity government.)	25 June 1945	5 November 1945	133 days	Gerhardsen I
	Erik Brofoss	Labour	5 November 1945	6 December 1947	2 years, 31 days	Gerhardsen II
	Olav Meisdalshagen	Labour	6 December 1947	19 November 1951	3 years, 348 days	
	Trygve Bratteli	Labour	19 November 1951	22 January 1955	3 years, 64 days	Torp
	Mons Lid	Labour	22 January 1955	28 December 1956	1 year, 341 days	Gerhardsen III
	Trygve Bratteli	Labour	28 December 1956	23 April 1960	3 years, 117 days	Gerhardsen III
	Petter Jakob Bjerve	Labour	23 April 1960	4 February 1963	2 years, 287 days	Gerhardsen III
	Andreas Cappelen	Labour	4 February 1963	28 August 1963	205 days	Gerhardsen III
	Dagfinn Vårvik	Centre	28 August 1963	25 September 1963	28 days	Lyng
	Andreas Cappelen	Labour	25 September 1963	12 October 1965	2 years, 17 days	Gerhardsen IV
	Ole Myrvoll	Liberal	12 October 1965	17 March 1971	5 years, 156 days	Borten
	Ragnar Christiansen	Labour	17 March 1971	18 October 1972	1 year, 215 days	Bratteli I
	Jon Ola Norbom	Liberal	18 October 1972	16 October 1973	363 days	Korvald
	Per Kleppe	Labour	16 October 1973	8 October 1979	5 years, 357 days	Bratteli II; Nordli
	Ulf Sand	Labour	8 October 1979	14 October 1981	2 years, 6 days	Nordli; Brundtland I
	Rolf Presthus	Conservative	14 October 1981	25 April 1986	4 years, 193 days	Willoch I-II
	Arne Skauge	Conservative	25 April 1986	9 May 1986	14 days	Willoch II
	Gunnar Berge	Labour	9 May 1986	16 October 1989	3 years, 160 days	Brundtland II
	Arne Skauge	Conservative	16 October 1989	3 November 1990	1 year, 18 days	Syse
	Sigbjørn Johnsen	Labour	3 November 1990	25 October 1996	5 years, 357 days	Brundtland III
	Jens Stoltenberg	Labour	25 October 1996	17 October 1997	357 days	Jagland
	Gudmund Restad	Centre	17 October 1997	17 March 2000	2 years, 152 days	Bondevik I

=== Ministry of Finance (2000–) ===
Photo	Name	Party	Took office	Left office	Tenure	Cabinet
	Karl Eirik Schjøtt-Pedersen	Labour	17 March 2000	19 October 2001	1 year, 216 days	Stoltenberg I
	Per-Kristian Foss	Conservative	19 October 2001	17 October 2005	3 years, 363 days	Bondevik II
	Kristin Halvorsen	Socialist Left	17 October 2005	20 October 2009	4 years, 3 days	Stoltenberg II
	Sigbjørn Johnsen	Labour	20 October 2009	16 October 2013	3 years, 361 days	Stoltenberg II
	Siv Jensen	Progress	16 October 2013	24 January 2020	6 years, 100 days	Solberg
	Jan Tore Sanner	Conservative	24 January 2020	14 October 2021	1 year, 263 days	Solberg
	Trygve Slagsvold Vedum	Centre	14 October 2021	4 February 2025	3 years, 113 days	Støre
	Jens Stoltenberg	Labour	4 February 2025	present	1 year, 284 days	Støre

== See also ==
- Norwegian Ministry of Finance
