= Second Willoch cabinet =

Government of Norway from 1983 to 1986

Willoch's Second Cabinet
- Cabinet of Norway
- Date formed: 8 June 1983
- Date dissolved: 9 May 1986

People and organisations
- Head of state: Olav V of Norway
- Head of government: Kåre Willoch
- Ministers removed: 9
- Total no. of members: 27
- Member parties: Conservative Party; Centre Party; Christian Democratic Party
- Status in legislature: Coalition (minority)
- Opposition party: Labour Party

History
- Election: 1985 parliamentary election
- Predecessor: Willoch's First Cabinet
- Successor: Brundtland's Second Cabinet

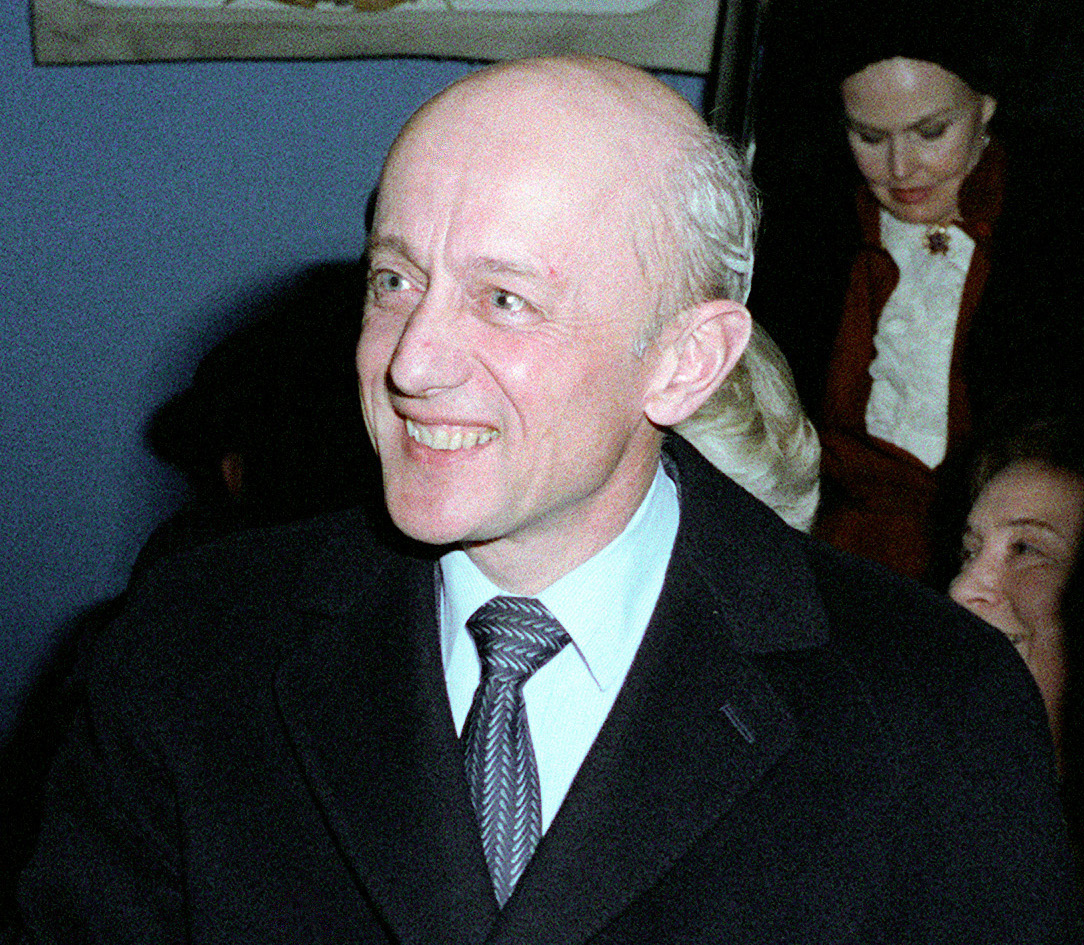
Kåre Willoch, 1983

Willoch's Second Cabinet was a majority, centre-right government consisting of the Conservative, Centre, Christian Democratic parties. It succeeded the Conservative First cabinet Willoch in mid-term to secure a majority, right-winged government, and sat from 8 June 1983 to 9 May 1986. It survived the 1985 election, but it was replaced by the Labour Brundtland's Second Cabinet, after it failed a vote of confidence in the Parliament of Norway seven months later.

== Cabinet members ==
Cabinet
Portfolio	Minister	Took office	Left office	Party
Prime Minister	Kåre Willoch	8 June 1983	9 May 1986	Conservative
Minister of Foreign Affairs	Svenn Stray	8 June 1983	9 May 1986	Conservative
Minister of Finance and Customs	Rolf Presthus	8 June 1983	25 April 1986	Conservative
Minister of Finance and Customs	Arne Skauge	25 April 1986	9 May 1986	Conservative
Minister of Defence	Anders C. Sjaastad	8 June 1983	25 April 1986	Conservative
Minister of Defence	Rolf Presthus	25 April 1986	9 May 1986	Conservative
Minister of Justice and the Police	Mona Røkke	8 June 1983	4 October 1985	Conservative
Minister of Justice and the Police	Wenche Frogn Sellæg	4 October 1985	9 May 1986	Conservative
Minister of Transport and Communications	Johan J. Jakobsen	8 June 1983	9 May 1986	Centre
Minister of Local Government and Labour	Arne Rettedal	8 June 1983	9 May 1986	Conservative
Minister of Education and Church Affairs; Deputy to the Prime Minister	Kjell Magne Bondevik	8 June 1983	9 May 1986	Christian Democratic
Minister of Culture and Research	Lars Roar Langslet	8 June 1983	9 May 1986	Conservative
Minister of Social Affairs	Leif Arne Heløe	8 June 1983	9 May 1986	Conservative
Minister of Agriculture	Finn T. Isaksen	8 June 1983	4 October 1985	Centre
Minister of Agriculture	Svein Sundsbø	4 October 1985	9 May 1986	Centre
Minister of Industry	Jens-Halvard Bratz	8 June 1983	16 September 1983	Conservative
Minister of Industry	Jan P. Syse	16 September 1983	4 October 1985	Conservative
Minister of Industry	Petter Thomassen	4 October 1985	9 May 1986	Conservative
Minister of Trade and Shipping; Minister of Nordic Cooperation	Asbjørn Haugstvedt	8 June 1983	9 May 1986	Christian Democratic
Minister of Family Affairs and Government Administration	Astrid Gjertsen	8 June 1983	18 April 1986	Conservative
Minister of Family Affairs and Government Administration	Astrid Nøkkelby Heiberg	18 April 1986	9 May 1986	Conservative
Minister of International Development	Reidun Brusletten	8 June 1983	9 May 1986	Christian Democratic
Minister of the Environment	Rakel Surlien	8 June 1983	9 May 1986	Centre
Minister of Petroleum and Energy	Kåre Kristiansen	8 June 1983	9 May 1986	Christian Democratic
Minister of Fisheries	Thor Listau	8 June 1983	4 October 1985	Conservative
Minister of Fisheries	Eivind Reiten	4 October 1985	9 May 1986	Centre

== See also ==
- First cabinet Willoch
- Norwegian Council of State
- Government of Norway
- List of Norwegian governments

Preceded by First cabinet Willoch	Norwegian Council of State; 1983–1986	Succeeded by Second cabinet Brundtland
