= Brita Borge =

Norwegian politician (1931–2013)

Brita Constance Borge (née Nyqvist; 20 October 1931 – 2 November 2013) was a Norwegian politician for the Conservative Party.

She was born Vasa, Finland as a daughter of dean Alvar Vilhelm Nyqvist (1893–1966) and rector Mary Constance Rosendal (1901–1952).

She was elected as a deputy representative to the Parliament of Norway from Hordaland in 1981. Until 1983 she served as a regular representative, covering for Arne Skauge who was a member of Willoch's First Cabinet. From 1984 to 1985 she again covered for Skauge, now a member of Willoch's Second Cabinet. In 1985 Borge was elected as a full representative and served one term. She was a member of the Standing Committee on Justice.
