= Ulf Sand =

Norwegian politician (1938–2014)

Minister of Finance
- In office 8 October 1979 – 14 October 1981
- Prime Minister: Odvar Nordli; Gro Harlem Brundtland
- Preceded by: Per Kleppe
- Succeeded by: Rolf Presthus

State Secretary for the Ministry of Consumer Affairs and Administration
- In office 22 October 1973 – 9 October 1977
- Prime Minister: Trygve Bratteli; Odvar Nordli
- Minister: Odd Sagør; Annemarie Lorentzen
- In office 8 May 1972 – 18 October 1972
- Prime Minister: Trygve Bratteli
- Minister: Inger Louise Valle

State Secretary for the Ministry of Pay and Prices
- In office 19 March 1971 – 8 May 1972
- Prime Minister: Trygve Bratteli
- Minister: Olav Gjærevoll

Personal details
- Born: Ulf Oscar Sand; 22 May 1938 Bærum, Akershus, Norway
- Died: 29 December 2014 (aged 76) Bærum, Akershus, Norway
- Party: Labour

Ulf Oscar Sand (22 May 1938 – 29 December 2014) was a Norwegian civil servant and politician for the Labour Party.

He was born in Bærum. He graduated as cand.oecon. from the University of Oslo in 1963. He worked as a civil servant in the Ministry of Finance from 1964, and then in the Norwegian Confederation of Trade Unions from 1966 to 1971.

From 1971 to 1972, in the first cabinet Bratteli, Sand was appointed state secretary in the Ministry of Pay and Prices and the Ministry of Consumer Affairs and Administration. He lost his job when the first cabinet Bratteli fell in 1972, but from 1973 to 1977 he returned as state secretary as part of the second cabinet Bratteli.

As an elected politician he was a member of the executive committee of Bærum municipal council from 1967 to 1971.

Sand returned to the Norwegian Confederation of Trade Unions as chief economist from 1977 to 1983. He returned to national politics in 1979, when he was appointed Minister of Finance in the cabinet Nordli. He retained his job when the cabinet Nordli was followed by the first cabinet Brundtland in 1981. However, this cabinet only lasted until October 1981, following the 1981 Norwegian parliamentary election.

Sand continued his career as director of the Norwegian State Educational Loan Fund from 1983 to 1986. From 1986 to his retirement in 2003 he was permanent under-secretary of State (departementsråd) in the Ministry of Local Government and Regional Development.

Political offices
| Preceded by Per Kleppe | Norwegian Minister of Finance; 1979–1981 | Succeeded by Rolf Presthus |
Civic offices
| Preceded by | Director of the Norwegian State Educational Loan Fund; 1983–1986 | Succeeded by Jan S. Levy |
