= First Brundtland cabinet =

Government of Norway from February to October 1981

Brundtland's First Cabinet
- Cabinet of Norway

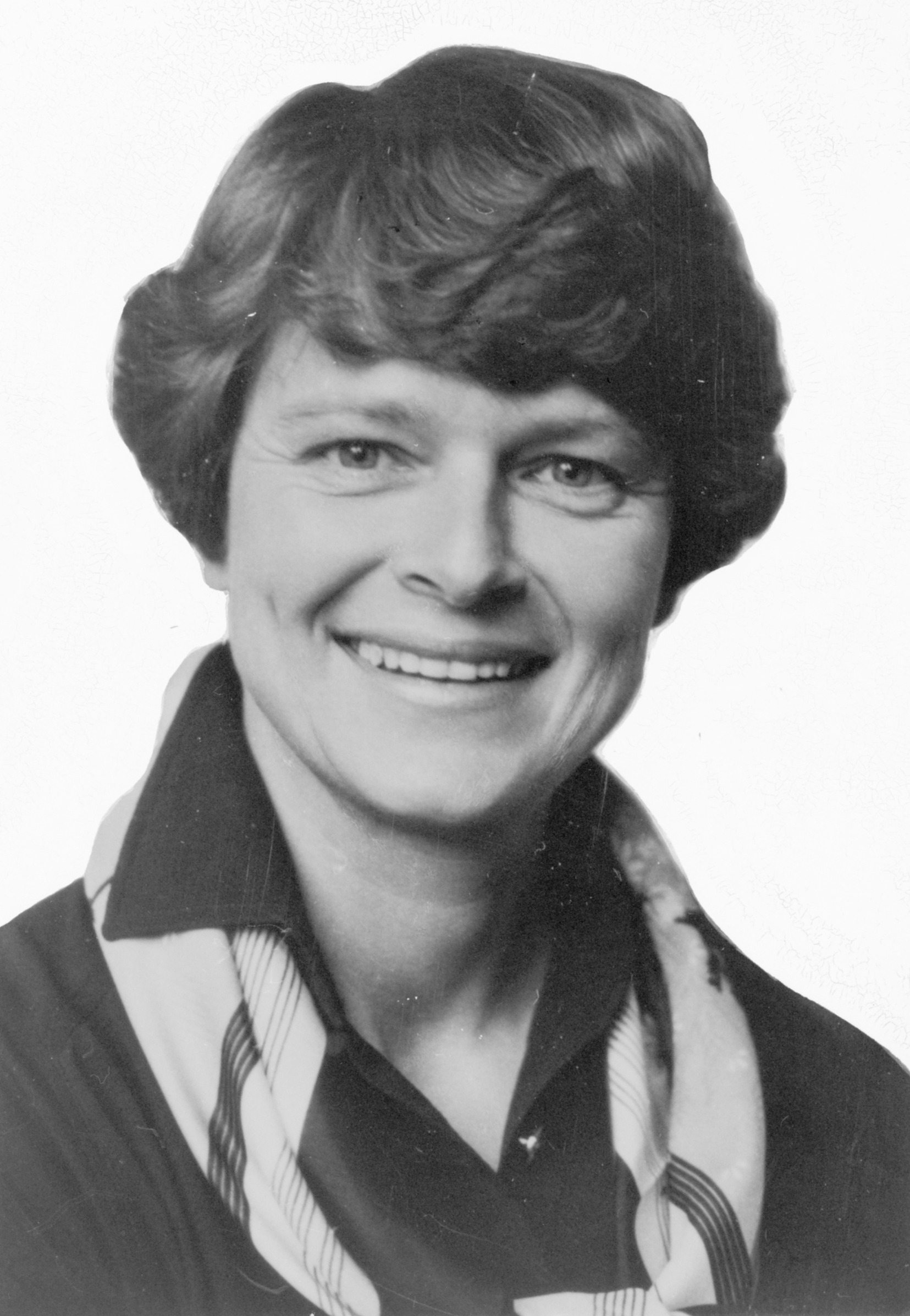
- Date formed: 4 February 1981
- Date dissolved: 14 October 1981

People and organisations
- King: Olav V of Norway
- Prime Minister: Gro Harlem Brundtland
- Total no. of members: 17
- Member party: Labour Party
- Status in legislature: Minority government

History
- Outgoing formation: 1981 parliamentary election
- Election: 1981 parliamentary election
- Legislature term: 1977–1981
- Predecessor: Nordli's Cabinet
- Successor: Willoch's First Cabinet

Brundtland's First Cabinet was a minority, Labour Government of Norway. It succeeded the Labour Cabinet Nordli, and sat between 4 February and 14 October 1981. The cabinet was the first in Norwegian history to be led by a woman. It was replaced by the Conservative Willoch's First Cabinet after the 1981 election.

== Cabinet members ==
Cabinet
Portfolio	Minister	Took office	Left office	Party
Prime Minister	Gro Harlem Brundtland	4 February 1981	14 October 1981	Labour
Minister of Foreign Affairs	Knut Frydenlund	4 February 1981	14 October 1981	Labour
Minister of Finance and Customs	Ulf Sand	4 February 1981	14 October 1981	Labour
Minister of Defence	Thorvald Stoltenberg	4 February 1981	14 October 1981	Labour
Minister of Justice and the Police	Bjørn Skau	4 February 1981	14 October 1981	Labour
Minister of Transport and Communications	Ronald Bye	4 February 1981	14 October 1981	Labour
Minister of Local Government and Labour	Harriet Andreassen	4 February 1981	14 October 1981	Labour
Minister of Education and Church Affairs	Einar Førde	4 February 1981	14 October 1981	Labour
Minister of Social Affairs	Arne Nilsen	4 February 1981	14 October 1981	Labour
Minister of Family Affairs and Government Administration	Sissel Rønbeck	4 February 1981	14 October 1981	Labour
Minister of Agriculture	Oskar Øksnes	4 February 1981	14 October 1981	Labour
Minister of Industry	Finn Kristensen	4 February 1981	14 October 1981	Labour
Minister of Trade and Shipping	Kari Gjesteby	4 February 1981	14 October 1981	Labour
Minister of the Environment	Rolf A. Hansen	4 February 1981	14 October 1981	Labour
Minister of Petroleum and Energy	Arvid Johanson	4 February 1981	14 October 1981	Labour
Minister of Fisheries	Eivind Bolle	4 February 1981	14 October 1981	Labour
