= First Willoch cabinet =

Government of Norway from 1981 to 1983

Willoch's First Cabinet
- Cabinet of Norway
- Date formed: 14 October 1981
- Date dissolved: 8 June 1983

People and organisations
- King: Olav V of Norway
- Prime Minister: Kåre Willoch
- Total no. of members: 17
- Member party: Conservative Party
- Status in legislature: Minority government
- Opposition party: Labour Party

History
- Election: 1981 parliamentary election
- Predecessor: Brundtland's First Cabinet
- Successor: Willoch's Second Cabinet

Willoch's First Cabinet was a minority, Conservative Government of Norway. It succeeded Brundtland's First Cabinet (which was a Labour government), after the Conservative victory in the 1981 Storting election; and sat from 14 October 1981 to 8 June 1983. It was replaced by Willoch's Second Cabinet, a coalition of the Conservative, Centre and Christian Democrat parties to form a majority government. Willoch's First Cabinet was the first Conservative-only cabinet since Stang's Second Cabinet of 1893–95, and there has not been another Conservative-only cabinet since.

== Members ==
Willoch's first cabinet had the following composition, with all of its members serving from 14 October 1981 to 8 June 1983:

Cabinet
Portfolio	Minister	Took office	Left office	Party
Prime Minister	Kåre Willoch	14 October 1981	8 June 1983	Conservative
Minister of Foreign Affairs	Svenn Stray	14 October 1981	8 June 1983	Conservative
Minister of Finance and Customs	Rolf Presthus	14 October 1981	8 June 1983	Conservative
Minister of Defence	Anders C. Sjaastad	14 October 1981	8 June 1983	Conservative
Minister of Justice and the Police	Mona Røkke	14 October 1981	8 June 1983	Conservative
Minister of Transport and Communications	Inger Koppernæs	14 October 1981	8 June 1983	Conservative
Minister of Local Government and Labour	Arne Rettedal	14 October 1981	8 June 1983	Conservative
Minister of Education and Church Affairs	Tore Austad	14 October 1981	8 June 1983	Conservative
Minister of Culture and Research	Lars Roar Langslet	14 October 1981	8 June 1983	Conservative
Minister of Social Affairs	Leif Arne Heløe	14 October 1981	8 June 1983	Conservative
Minister of Agriculture	Johan C. Løken	14 October 1981	8 June 1983	Conservative
Minister of Industry	Jens-Halvard Bratz	14 October 1981	8 June 1983	Conservative
Minister of Trade and Shipping	Arne Skauge	14 October 1981	8 June 1983	Conservative
Minister of Family Affairs and Government Administration	Astrid Gjertsen	14 October 1981	8 June 1983	Conservative
Minister of the Environment	Wenche Frogn Sellæg	14 October 1981	8 June 1983	Conservative
Minister of Petroleum and Energy	Vidkunn Hveding	14 October 1981	8 June 1983	Conservative
Minister of Fisheries	Thor Listau	14 October 1981	8 June 1983	Conservative

== See also ==
- Second cabinet Willoch
- Norwegian Council of State
- Government of Norway
- List of Norwegian governments

Preceded by First cabinet Brundtland	Norwegian Council of State; 1981–1983	Succeeded by Second cabinet Willoch
