= Oskar Øksnes =

Norwegian politician

Minister of Agriculture
- In office 15 January 1976 – 14 October 1981
- Prime Minister: Odvar Nordli; Gro Harlem Brundtland
- Preceded by: Thorstein Treholt
- Succeeded by: Johan C. Løken

State Secretary for the Ministry of Agriculture
- In office 17 April 1964 – 12 October 1965
- Prime Minister: Einar Gerhardsen
- Minister: Leif Granli

Deputy Member of the Norwegian Parliament
- In office 1 October 1961 – 30 September 1965
- Constituency: Nord-Trøndelag

Personal details
- Born: Oskar Ingemann Øksnes; 11 April 1921 Kvam Municipality, Norway
- Died: 27 March 1999 (aged 77)
- Party: Labour

Oskar Ingemann Øksnes (11 April 1921 – 27 March 1999) was a Norwegian politician for the Labour Party. He was born in Kvam Municipality in Nord-Trøndelag. An agronomist by education, Øksnes was state secretary to the Minister of Agriculture from 1964 to 1965, during the Gerhardsen's Fourth Cabinet. He later became Minister of Agriculture in 1976, and served in the post until 1981 in Nordli's Cabinet and Brundtland's First Cabinet.

He was decorated Knight, First Order of the Royal Norwegian Order of St. Olav in 1987.

Political offices
Preceded by Thorstein Treholt	Minister of Agriculture; 1976–1981	Succeeded by Johan Christen Løken
