= Per Kleppe =

Norwegian economist and politician (1923–2021)

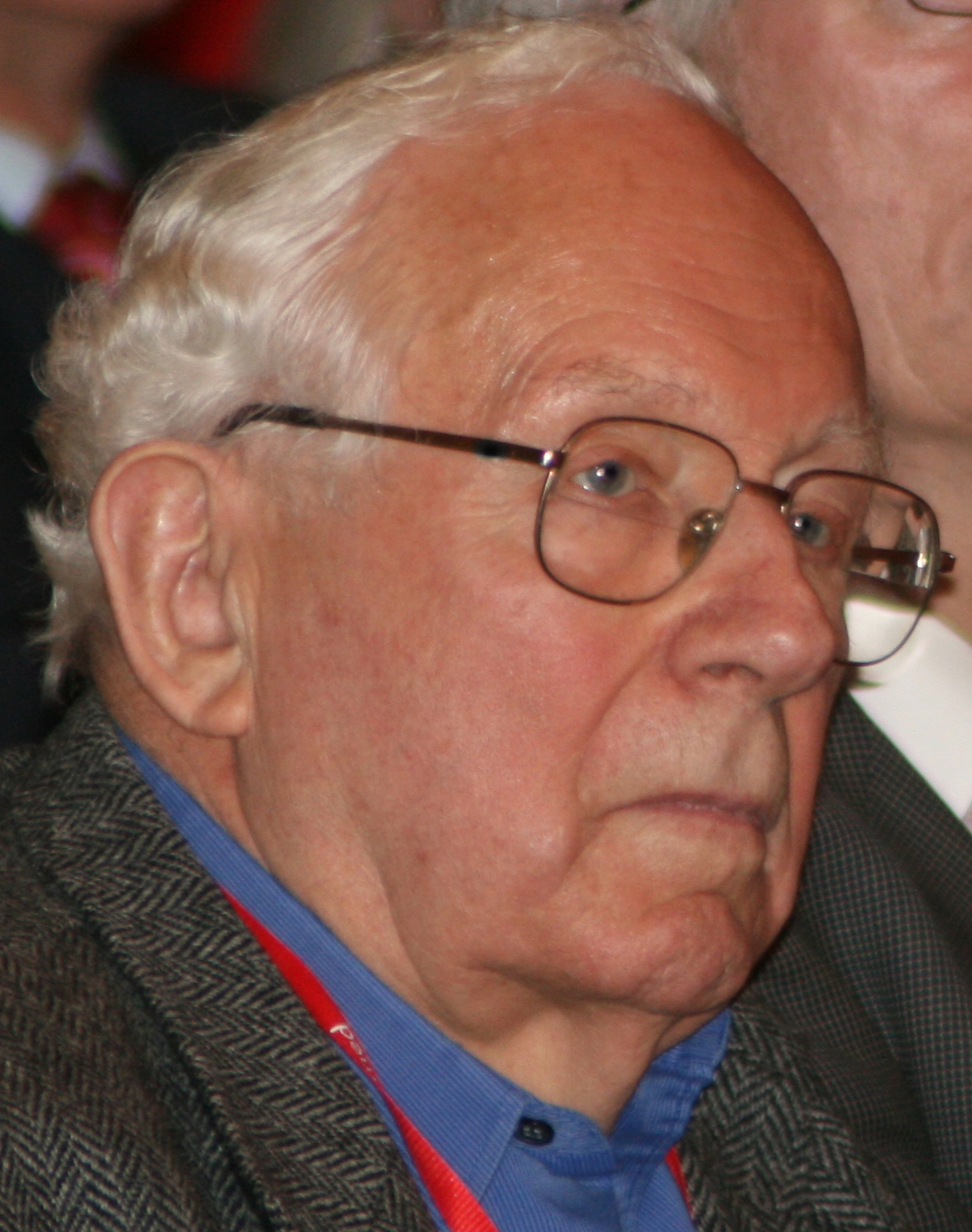
- Kleppe in 2009

Minister of Finance
- In office 16 October 1973 – 8 October 1979
- Prime Minister: Trygve Bratteli; Odvar Nordli
- Preceded by: Jon Ola Norbom
- Succeeded by: Ulf Sand

Minister of Trade and Shipping
- In office 17 March 1971 – 18 October 1972
- Prime Minister: Trygve Bratteli
- Preceded by: Otto G. Tidemand
- Succeeded by: Hallvard Eika

Minister of Nordic Cooperation
- In office 24 September 1971 – 18 October 1972
- Prime Minister: Trygve Bratteli
- Preceded by: Position established
- Succeeded by: Hallvard Eika

Personal details
- Born: Per Andreas Hildhe Kleppe; 13 April 1923 Oslo, Norway
- Died: 10 March 2021 (aged 97)
- Party: Labour
- Spouse: Margaretha Ström
- Children: Astri Kleppe

Per Andreas Hildhe Kleppe (13 April 1923 – 10 March 2021) was a Norwegian economist and politician for the Labour Party.

He was the Minister of Trade and Shipping in 1971–1972 during the first cabinet Bratteli, and later the Minister of Finance from 1973 to 1979 during the second cabinet Bratteli and the cabinet Nordli. In 1979 he was replaced by Ulf Sand, but Kleppe returned in 1980 to head the Secretariat for Long-Term Planning (until 1981).

He served as General Secretary of the European Free Trade Association (EFTA) from 1981 to 1988.

== Personal life ==
Kleppe was born in Kristiania (now Oslo) in April 1923, a son of lawyer Knut Sigurd Kleppe and Nathalie Mathilde Andersen; the family moved to Bergen when he was six years old. In 1951 he married editor Margaretha Eva Malmros Ström.

== Political career ==
=== Deputy member of the Storting and State Secretary ===
As an elected politician Kleppe served in the position of deputy representative to the Norwegian Parliament from Oslo during the term 1954–1957. On the local level he was a deputy member of Oslo city council from 1951 to 1955.

Kleppe graduated from the University of Oslo with the cand.oecon. degree in 1956. He was appointed State Secretary in the Ministry of Finance from 1957 to 1962.

From 1962 Kleppe was assigned full time secretary of Den finanspolitiske komité, and from 1963 to 1967 he was subdirector at EFTA in Geneva, and from 1967 to 1971 he headed Arbeiderbevegelsens utredningskontor ("The Labour movement's Research Office").

=== Minister of Trade and Shipping 1971–1972 and negotiations on EEC membership ===
Kleppe was the Minister of Trade and Shipping in the first cabinet Bratteli from 17 March 1971 to 18 October 1972. From 24 September 1971 he was also assigned the inaugural position of Minister of Nordic Cooperation, responsible for coordinating cooperation between the Nordic countries.

As Minister of trade Kleppe was given the task to finish the negotiations of Norwegian membership of the European Economic Community (EEC). However, membership was turned down by the 1972 Norwegian European Communities membership referendum on 25 September 1972, and the Bratteli cabinet resigned. After this, from 1972 to 1973, Kleppe returned to his manager position at the Arbeiderbevegelsens utredningskontor.

=== Minister of Finance 1973–1979 and the "Kleppe package" against the financial crisis ===
Kleppe was appointed by Prime Minister Bratteli as Minister of Finance from 16 October 1973, in the second cabinet Bratteli. This cabinet lasted until 15 January 1976, when the cabinet Nordli took over. Kleppe continued as Minister of Finance until 8 October 1979, when there was a reorganisation of the cabinet, and Ulf Sand took over as responsible for the Ministry of Finance.

Kleppe served six years as Minister of Finance, and he was the architect behind several important strategic choices of economic policy. The so-called "Kleppe package", where the State contributed by offering improvements of certain benefits during salary negotiations between employer and employee organisations, came to be a central element to minimize inflation. In order to inhibit the threatening increase of unemployment, the government introduced several supportive measures and economic guarantees to the industry, in particular to maritime transport and shipyards.

=== Head of the Secretariat for Long-Term Planning 1980–1981 ===
From 1 January 1980 Kleppe was assigned the inaugural leader of the Secretariat for Long-Term Planning, under the cabinet Nordli until 4 February 1981. He continued in this position under Brundtland's First Cabinet until 14 October 1981.

=== General secretary of EFTA 1981–1988 ===
In 1981 Kleppe took over as general secretary of the European Free Trade Association, succeeding Swiss Charles Müller. He held this position until 1988, when he was succeeded by Austrian Georg Reisch.

== Later years ==
After he left his position at EFTA in 1988, Kleppe was assigned with the Fafo Foundation. He also chaired several government commissions in the late 1980s and early 1990s, including the Monetary and Credit Commission (1987–1989), the Employment Commission (1991–1992), and the State Bank Commission (1994–1995). He wrote the books Norges vei til Europa (1989) and Visjonen og hverdagen (1990), and finally his memoirs/autobiography, Kleppepakke, which was released in 2003.

== Legacy and death ==
Kleppe was a member of the Norwegian Research Council for Science and the Humanities (a precursor of Research Council of Norway).

He was decorated with the Grand Cross of the Portuguese Order of Christ (1978), the Order of the Yugoslav Flag with Golden Star on Cravat (III rank) (1987), the Grand Cross of the Icelandic Order of the Falcon (1988), the Grand Cross of the Swedish Order of the Polar Star (1988), and the Grand Cross of the Order of the Lion of Finland (1988). He was decorated Commander with Star of the Order of St. Olav in 1989.

Kleppe died on 10 March 2021, aged 97.

== Selected works ==
- Main aspects of economic policy in Norway since the war. Oslo, Bergen: Universitetsforlaget. 1968. OCLC 5753685.
- EFTA-Nordek-EEC. Stockholm: Studieförbundet Näringsliv och Samhälle. 1970. OCLC 467077470.
- Bank- og kredittvesenet. Oslo: Tiden. 1974. ISBN 9788210008832. OCLC 1028247583.
- Norsk økonomi og dens internasjonale sammenheng. Oslo: Den Norske Atlanterhavskomité. 1979. OCLC 13236120.
- Norges vei til Europa. Oslo: Aschehoug. 1989. ISBN 9788203161803. OCLC 21448769.
- Visjonen og hverdagen. Oslo: Tiden norsk forlag. 1990. ISBN 9788210033391. OCLC 23254979.
- Kleppepakke. Meninger og minner fra et politisk liv. Oslo: Aschehoug. 2003. ISBN 9788203229220. OCLC 55207725. Autobiography.

Political offices
Preceded by Otto Grieg Tidemand	Norwegian Minister of Trade and Shipping; 1971–1972	Succeeded by Hallvard Eika
Preceded by Jon Ola Norbom	Norwegian Minister of Finance; 1973–1979	Succeeded by Ulf Sand
Diplomatic posts
Preceded by Charles Müller	General Secretary of the European Free Trade Association; 1981–1988	Succeeded by Georg Reisch
