= Minister of Nordic Cooperation (Norway) =

Government ministry of Norway

Minister of Nordic Cooperation of Norway
- Nordisk samarbeidsminister

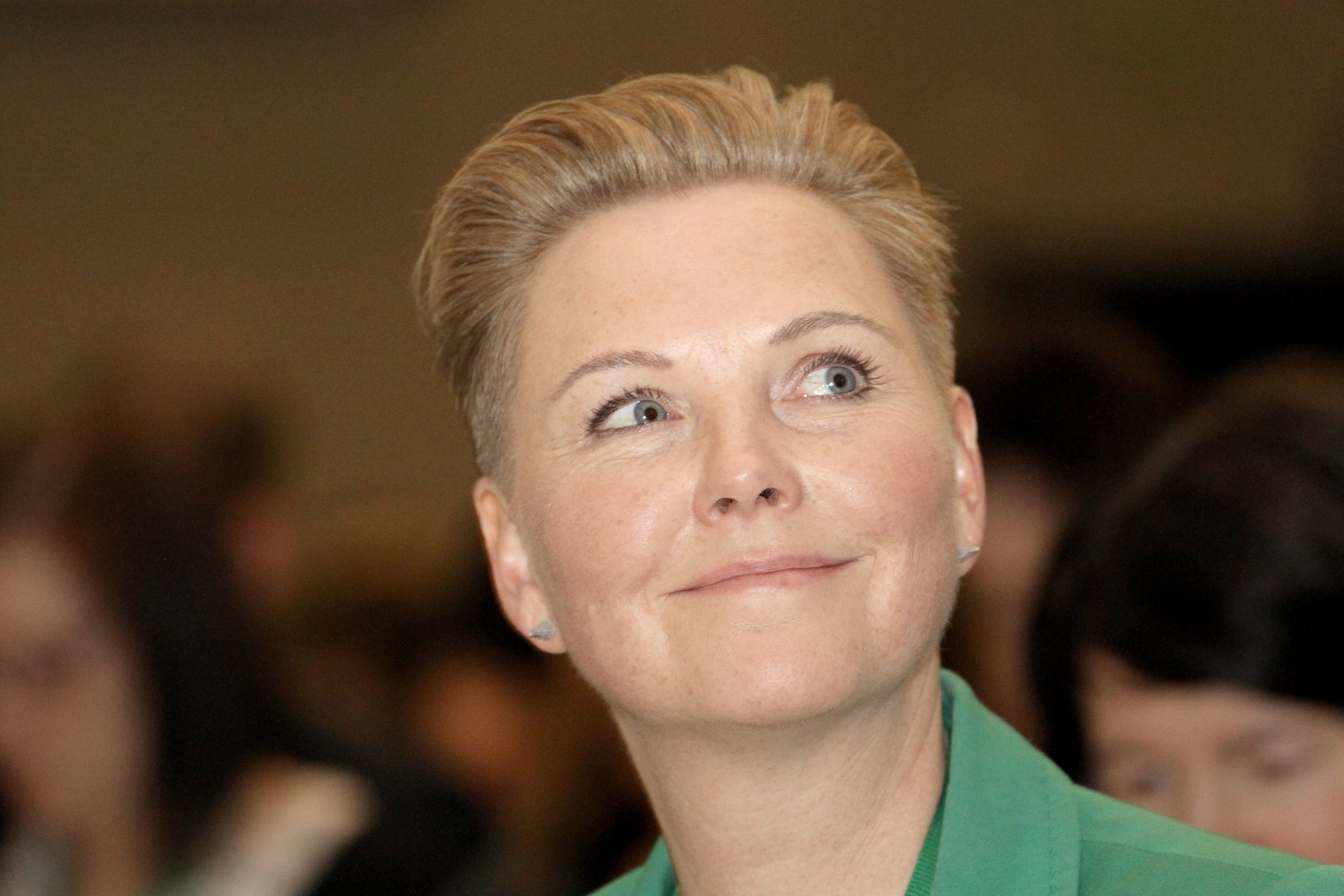
- Incumbent; Anne Beathe Tvinnereim since 14 October 2021
- Member of: Council of State
- Seat: Oslo
- Nominator: Prime Minister
- Appointer: Monarch with approval of Parliament
- Term length: No fixed length
- Constituting instrument: Constitution of Norway
- Formation: 24 September 1971
- First holder: Per Kleppe

The Minister of Nordic Cooperation is a ministerial post given to a member of the Norwegian cabinet and is held concurrently with their respective posts. It was created in 1971 and does not have its own ministry, but is regardless given to any member of a cabinet. The minister is responsible for tasks related to Nordic cooperation.

== List of ministers ==
| No. | Minister | | Position | Took office | Left office | Duration | Party | Prime Minister |
|---|---|---|---|---|---|---|---|---|
| 1 | Per Kleppe | Per Kleppe (1923–2021) | Minister of Trade and Shipping | 24 September 1971 | 18 October 1972 | 1 year, 24 days | Labour | Trygve Bratteli (Labour) |
| 2 | Hallvard Eika | Hallvard Eika (1920–1989) | Minister of Trade and Shipping | 18 October 1972 | 16 October 1973 | 363 days | Liberal | Lars Korvald (Christian Democratic) |
| 3 | Bjartmar Gjerde | Bjartmar Gjerde (1931–2009) | Minister of Education and Church Affairs (1973-1976); Minister of Industry (1976-1978); Minister of Petroleum and Energy (1978-1980) | 16 October 1973 | 3 October 1980 | 6 years, 353 days | Labour | Trygve Bratteli; Odvar Nordli (Labour) |
| 4 | Rolf Hansen | Rolf Hansen (1920–2006) | Minister of the Environment | 3 October 1980 | 14 October 1981 | 1 year, 11 days | Labour | Odvar Nordli; Gro Harlem Brundtland (Labour) |
| 5 | Arne Skauge | Arne Skauge (born 1948) | Minister of Trade and Shipping | 14 October 1981 | 8 June 1983 | 1 year, 237 days | Conservative | Kåre Willoch (Conservative) |
| 6 | Asbjørn Haugstvedt | Asbjørn Haugstvedt (1926–2008) | Minister of Trade and Shipping | 8 June 1983 | 9 May 1986 | 2 years, 335 days | Christian Democratic | Kåre Willoch (Conservative) |
| 7 | Bjarne Mørk-Eidem | Bjarne Mørk-Eidem (born 1936) | Minister of Fisheries | 9 May 1986 | 16 October 1989 | 3 years, 160 days | Labour | Gro Harlem Brundtland (Labour) |
| 8 | Tom Vraalsen | Tom Vraalsen (born 1936) | Minister of International Development | 16 October 1989 | 3 November 1990 | 1 year, 18 days | Centre | Jan P. Syse (Conservative) |
| 9 | Kjell Borgen | Kjell Borgen (1939–1996) | Minister of Local Government | 3 November 1990 | 4 September 1992 | 1 year, 306 days | Labour | Gro Harlem Brundtland (Labour) |
| 10 | Gunnar Berge | Gunnar Berge (born 1940) | Minister of Local Government | 4 September 1992 | 25 October 1996 | 4 years, 51 days | Labour | Gro Harlem Brundtland (Labour) |
| 11 | Grete Knudsen | Grete Knudsen (born 1940) | Minister of Trade and Industry (Jan. - Oct. 1997) | 25 October 1996 | 17 October 1997 | 357 days | Labour | Thorbjørn Jagland (Labour) |
| 12 | Ragnhild Queseth Haarstad | Ragnhild Queseth Haarstad (1939–2017) | Minister of Local Government | 17 October 1997 | 16 March 1999 | 1 year, 150 days | Centre | Kjell Magne Bondevik (Christian Democratic) |
| 13 | Peter Angelsen | Peter Angelsen (born 1935) | Minister of Fisheries | 16 March 1999 | 21 January 2000 | 311 days | Centre | Kjell Magne Bondevik (Christian Democratic) |
| 14 | Kåre Gjønnes | Kåre Gjønnes (1942–2021) | Minister of Agriculture | 21 January 2000 | 17 March 2000 | 56 days | Christian Democratic | Kjell Magne Bondevik (Christian Democratic) |
| 15 | Jørgen Kosmo | Jørgen Kosmo (1947–2017) | Minister of Labour and Administration | 17 March 2000 | 5 October 2001 | 1 year, 202 days | Labour | Jens Stoltenberg (Labour) |
| – | Sylvia Brustad | Sylvia Brustad (born 1966); Acting | Minister of Local Government | 5 October 2001 | 19 October 2001 | 14 days | Labour | Jens Stoltenberg (Labour) |
| 16 | Svein Ludvigsen | Svein Ludvigsen (born 1946) | Minister of Fisheries | 19 October 2001 | 17 October 2005 | 3 years, 363 days | Conservative | Kjell Magne Bondevik (Christian Democratic) |
| 17 | Heidi Grande Røys | Heidi Grande Røys (born 1967) | Minister of Labour and Administration | 17 October 2005 | 20 October 2009 | 4 years, 3 days | Socialist Left | Jens Stoltenberg (Labour) |
| 18 | Rigmor Aasrud | Rigmor Aasrud (born 1960) | Minister of Labour and Administration | 20 October 2009 | 16 October 2013 | 3 years, 361 days | Labour | Jens Stoltenberg (Labour) |
| 19 | Elisabeth Aspaker | Elisabeth Aspaker (born 1962) | Minister of Fisheries (2013-2015); Minister of European Affairs (2015-2016) | 16 October 2013 | 20 December 2016 | 3 years, 65 days | Conservative | Erna Solberg (Conservative) |
| 20 | Frank Bakke-Jensen | Frank Bakke-Jensen (born 1965) | Minister of European Affairs (2016-2017); Minister of Defence (2017-2021) | 20 December 2016 | 17 January 2018 | 1 year, 28 days | Conservative | Erna Solberg (Conservative) |
| 21 | Jan Tore Sanner | Jan Tore Sanner (born 1965) | Minister of Education and Integration (2018-2020); Minister of Finance (2020-2021) | 17 January 2018 | 14 October 2021 | 3 years, 270 days | Conservative | Erna Solberg (Conservative) |
| 22 | Anne Beathe Tvinnereim | Anne Beathe Tvinnereim (born 1974) | Minister of International Development (2021-) | 14 October 2021 | | 4 years, 329 days | Centre | Jonas Gahr Støre (Labour) |
