= Mette Kongshem =

Norwegian diplomat

Mette Kongshem (born 7 May 1941) is a retired Norwegian diplomat and was formerly a politician for the Conservative Party.

She was born in Oslo, and is a cand.mag. by education. She started working for the Norwegian Ministry of Foreign Affairs in 1976. From 1981 to 1983, she served as a State Secretary in the Ministry of Trade as a part of the first cabinet Willoch. She was then a counsellor at the Norwegian embassy in the United States from 1983 to 1990, before returning to the Norwegian Ministry of Foreign Affairs. She was the Norwegian ambassador to the Czech Republic from 1996 to 1999, deputy under-secretary of state in the Ministry of Foreign Affairs from 1999 to 2002, Norwegian ambassador to the Organization for Security and Co-operation in Europe from 2002 to 2006, and Norwegian ambassador to Central Asia from 2006.
