= Henrik Laurentius Helliesen =

Norwegian politician (1824–1900)

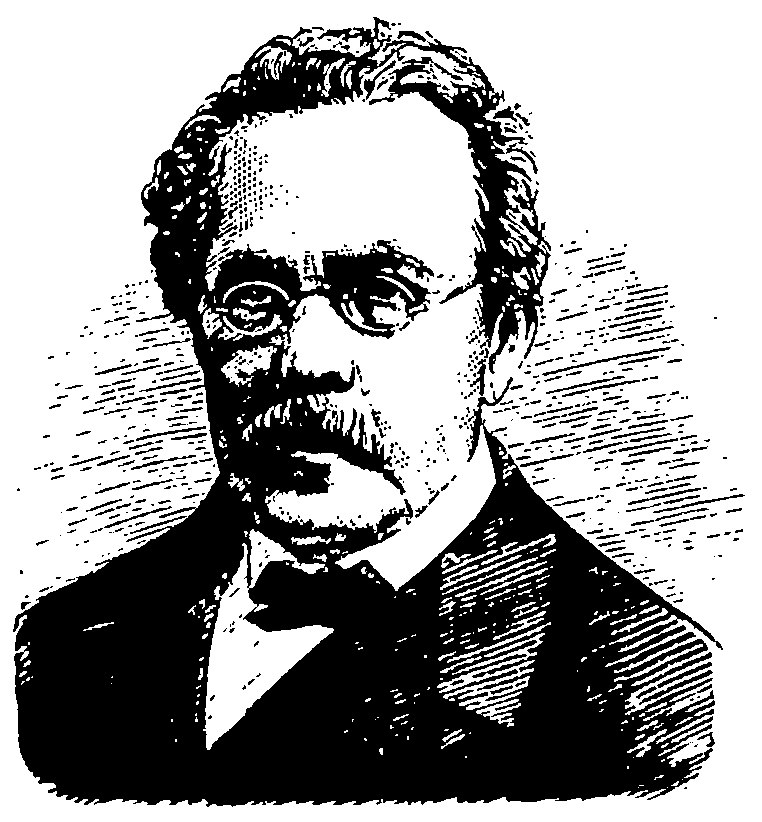
Henrik Laurentius Helliesen.

Henrik Laurentius Helliesen (20 December 1824–22 July 1900) was a Norwegian civil servant and politician.

Helliesen was born in Bodø in Nordland county, Norway. He studied law and earned his law degree at the University of Christiania in 1847. He was employed by the Ministry of Finance in 1849 and advanced to bureau chief in 1853 and deputy secretary in 1854. He was the County Governor of Nedenes amt from 1860-1863. Also, he represented the town of Arendal in the Norwegian Parliament from 1862 to 1863.

He was the Norwegian Minister of Finance for several periods between 1863 and 1883, and was a member of the Council of State Division in Stockholm several times between 1865 and 1884. He was also Minister of Education and Church Affairs in 1884. He died in Fåberg on 22 July 1900.

Government offices
Preceded by Iver Steen Thomle	County Governor of Nedenæs amt 1860–1863	Succeeded by Niels Wisløff Rogstad
