= Presthus =

Presthus is a surname. Notable people with the surname include:

- Rolf Presthus (1936–1988), Norwegian politician
- Tom Presthus (born 1975), American soccer player
