= Sigbjørn Johnsen =

Norwegian politician

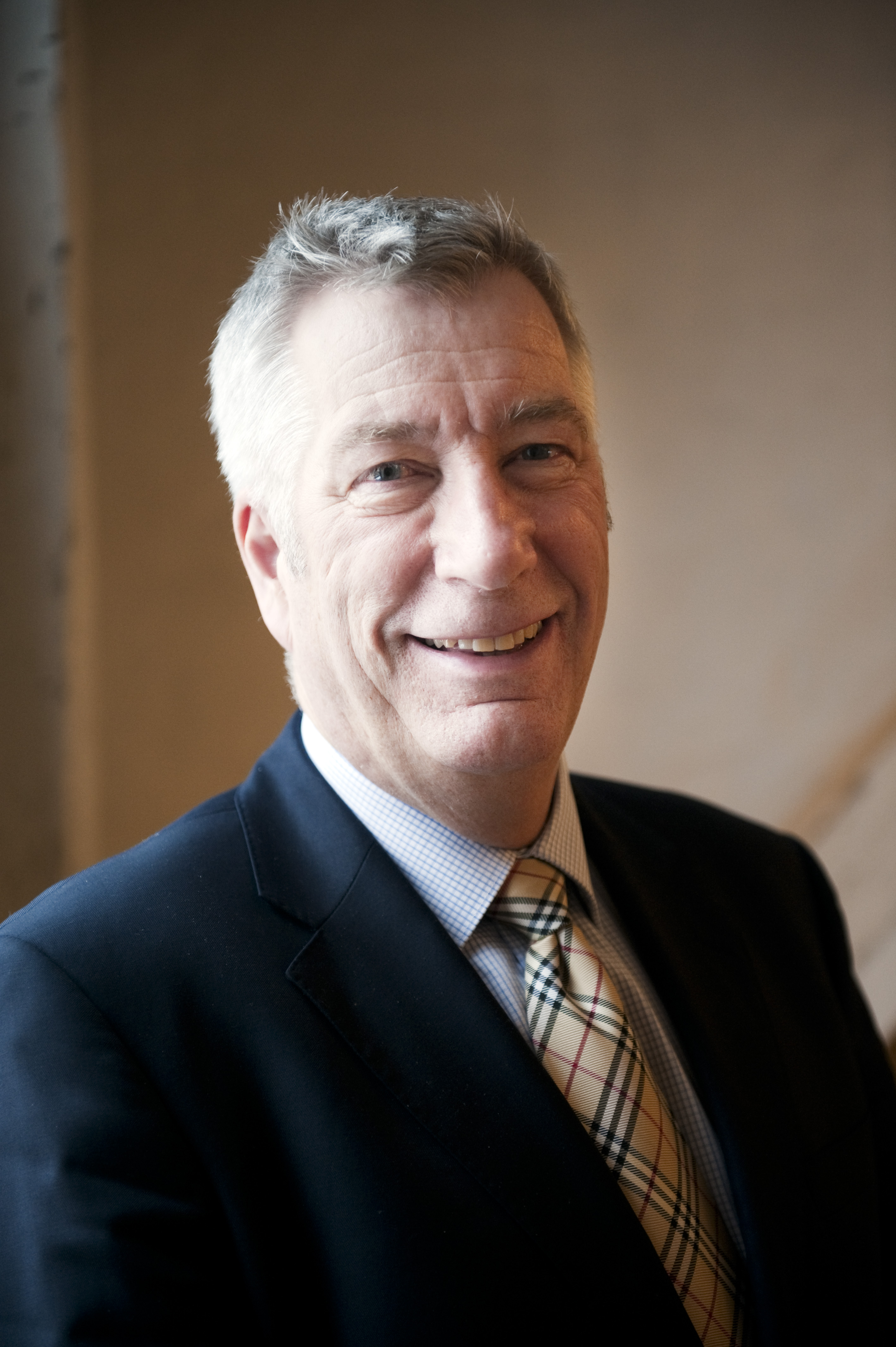
- Johnsen in 2009

Minister of Finance
- In office 20 October 2009 – 16 October 2013
- Prime Minister: Jens Stoltenberg
- Preceded by: Kristin Halvorsen
- Succeeded by: Siv Jensen
- In office 3 November 1990 – 25 October 1996
- Prime Minister: Gro Harlem Brundtland
- Preceded by: Arne Skauge
- Succeeded by: Jens Stoltenberg

Governor of Hedmark
- In office 1 October 1997 – 31 December 2018
- Monarch: Harald V
- Prime Minister: Thorbjørn Jagland; Kjell Magne Bondevik; Jens Stoltenberg; Erna Solberg
- Preceded by: Jon A. Lea
- Succeeded by: Tormod W. Karlstrøm (acting)

Member of the Norwegian Parliament
- In office 1 October 1977 – 30 September 1997
- Constituency: Hedmark

Personal details
- Born: 1 October 1950 (age 76) Lillehammer, Norway
- Party: Labour Party
- Spouse: Helle Laier Johnsen
- Children: 1
- Education: Norwegian School of Management

Sigbjørn Johnsen (born 1 October 1950) is a Norwegian politician for the Labour Party and was Norwegian Minister of Finance in the periods 1990–1996 and 2009–2013.

He is a former member of parliament and served as County Governor of Hedmark from 1997 to 2018. He was member of parliament for Hedmark between 1977 and 1997 and was the Minister of Finance from 1990 to 1996 during the Brundtland's Third Cabinet. He made a comeback in national politics when again he became Minister of Finance in 2009 Stoltenberg's Second Cabinet. After serving in the Stoltenberg's Second Cabinet, he resumed his duty as County Governor of Hedmark.

He was also the deputy chairman of the Workers' Youth League between 1975 and 1977.

Political offices
Preceded by Kristin Halvorsen	Norwegian Minister of Finance; 2009–2013	Succeeded by Siv Jensen
Preceded by Arne Skauge	Norwegian Minister of Finance; 1990–1996	Succeeded by Jens Stoltenberg

Preceded by Jon Arvid Lea (acting)	County Governor of Hedmark; 1997–2018	Succeeded by Tormod W. Karlstrøm (acting)
