= Annfinn Lund =

Norwegian civil servant and politician (1926–2001)

Annfinn Lund (5 April 1926 – 2001) was a Norwegian civil servant and politician for the Labour Party.

He was born in Leka Municipality, and is a cand.jur. by education. He was employed at the Development Fund for Northern Norway, the predecessor of the Regional Development Fund, the Industrial and Regional Development Fund and Innovation Norway, in 1955. He was promoted to deputy director in 1970, but in 1973 he was appointed as state secretary in the Ministry of Local Government and Labour as a part of the second cabinet Bratteli. From 1978 to 1980 he was a state secretary in the Ministry of Transport and Communications, and from 1980 to 1981 he was the County Governor of Hedmark. From 1981 to 1993 he was the deputy under-secretary of state in the Ministry of Local Government and Labour.

Civic offices
| Preceded by Erling Anger | County Governor of Hedmark; 1980–1981 | Succeeded by Odvar Nordli |
