= Øystein Rian =

Norwegian historian (born 1945)

- Born: 23 February 1945 (age 81); Lillehammer, Norway

Academic work
- Discipline: history
- Institutions: Telemark University College; University of Oslo
- Main interests: history of Denmark-Norway from 1536 to 1814

Øystein Rian (born 23 February 1945, in Lillehammer) is a Norwegian historian who specializes in the history of Denmark-Norway from 1536 to 1814, particularly its political, social and religious history.

He was appointed associate professor at Telemark University College in 1977, and was a professor at the University of Oslo from 1993 until reaching the emeritus age in 2015. He is a member of the Norwegian Academy of Science and Letters.

He is the younger brother of Erlend Rian. Rian is openly gay.

== Selected bibliography ==
- Jens Juels stattholderskap 1618-1629, 1975
- Vestfolds historie. Grevskapstiden 1671-1821, 1980
- Foreningen med Danmark 1536-1814, volume 1 of Norsk utenrikspolitikks historie, 1995
- Den nye begynnelsen 1520-1660, volume 5 of Aschehougs Norgeshistorie, 1995
- Bratsberg på 1600-tallet, 1997
- Den aristokratiske fyrstestaten 1536-1648, volume 2 of Danmark-Norge 1380-1814, 1997
- Maktens historie i dansketiden, 2003
- Embetsstanden i dansketida, 2003
- For Norge kjempers fødeland. 12 portrett frå dansketida, 2007
