= Niels Andreas Thrap =

Norwegian civil servant and politician

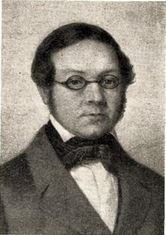
Niels Andreas Thrap

Niels Andreas Thrap (2 October 1793 – 9 November 1856) was a Norwegian civil servant and politician. He was temporary Minister of Finance in 1852 and 1854, and temporary Minister of the Navy 1852–53.

He obtained a cand.jur. degree in 1815 and worked as magistrate (byfogd) in Christiania from 1831. He was a member of the Parliament of Norway from Christiania in one period from 1833 to 1835.
