= Arne Nilsen =

Norwegian politician (1924–2020)

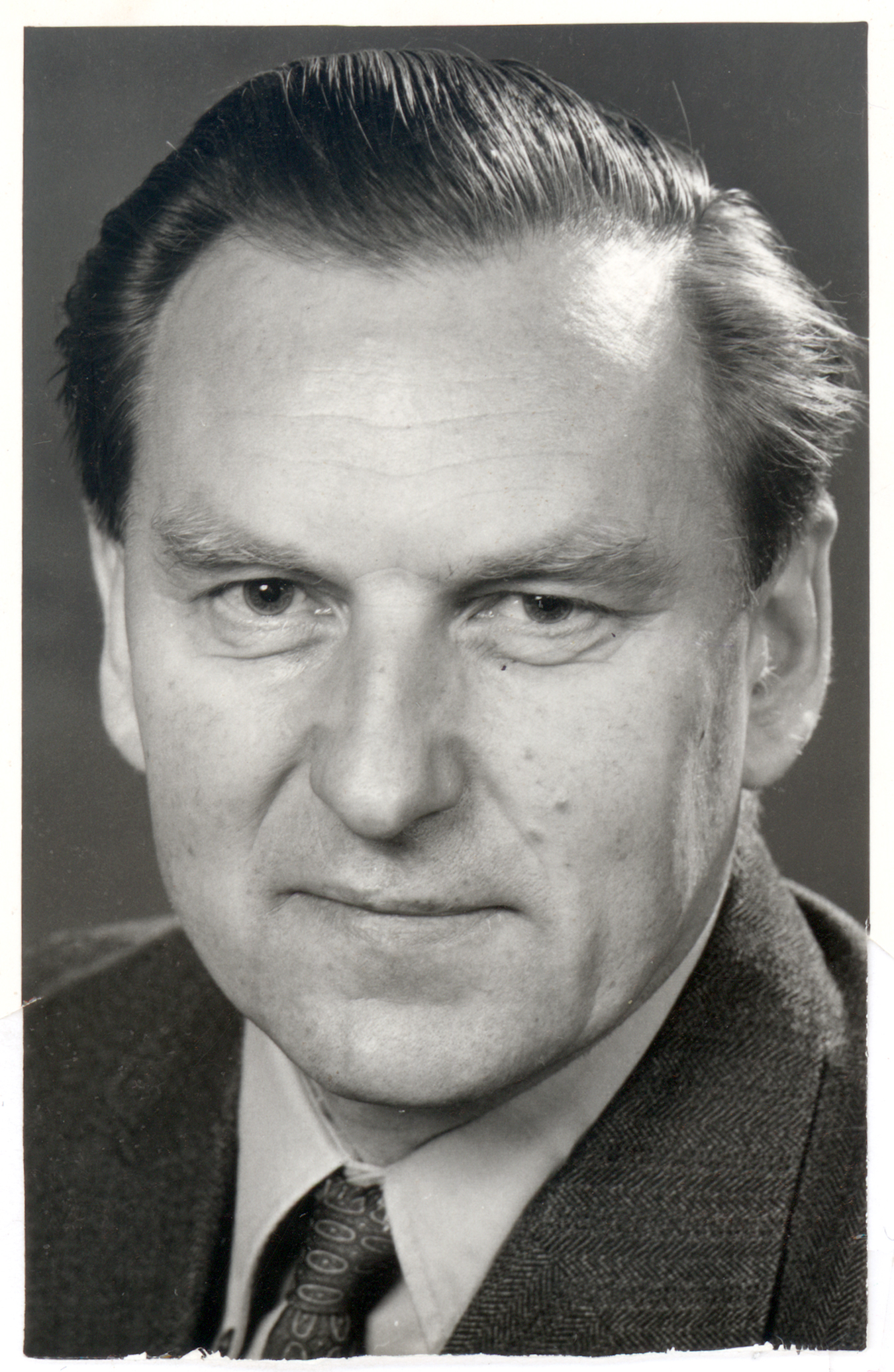

President of the Odelsting
- In office 15 October 1981 – 30 September 1985
- Preceded by: Asbjørn Haugstvedt
- Succeeded by: Åshild Hauan

Minister of Social Affairs
- In office 8 October 1979 – 14 October 1981
- Prime Minister: Odvar Nordli; Gro Harlem Brundtland
- Preceded by: Ruth Ryste
- Succeeded by: Leif Arne Heløe

Minister of Local Government
- In office 11 January 1978 – 8 October 1979
- Prime Minister: Odvar Nordli
- Preceded by: Leif Aune
- Succeeded by: Inger Louise Valle

Personal details
- Born: 21 January 1924 Bergen, Hordaland, Norway
- Died: 16 April 2020 (aged 96) Voss, Hordaland, Norway
- Party: Labour

Arne Nilsen (21 January 1924 – 16 April 2020) was a Norwegian politician for the Labour Party. He was Minister of Local Government from 1978 to 1979, as well as Minister of Social Affairs from 1979 to 1981. He was also President of the Odelsting from 1981–1985.

He died in April 2020 at the age of 96.

Political offices
Preceded by Leif Jørgen Aune	Minister of Local Government; 1978–1979	Succeeded by Inger Louise Valle
Preceded by Ruth Ryste	Minister of Social Affairs; 1979–1981	Succeeded by Leif Arne Heløe
Preceded by Asbjørn Haugstvedt	President of the Odelsting; 1981–1985	Succeeded by Åshild Hauan
