= Johan C. Løken =

Norwegian politician (1944–2017)

Minister of Agriculture
- In office 14 October 1981 – 8 June 1983
- Prime Minister: Kåre Willoch
- Preceded by: Oskar Øksnes
- Succeeded by: Finn T. Isaksen

Member of the Norwegian Parliament
- In office 1 October 1981 – 30 September 1993
- Constituency: Hedmark

Leader of the Hedmark Conservatives
- In office 1976–1982
- Preceded by: Position established
- Succeeded by: Kristian Borud

Personal details
- Born: Johan Christen Løken; 27 July 1944 Elverum, Hedmark, Norway
- Died: 18 December 2017 (aged 73) Elverum, Hedmark, Norway
- Party: Conservative

Johan Christen Løken (27 July 1944 – 18 December 2017) was a Norwegian politician for the Conservative Party. He was Minister of Agriculture from 1981 to 1983, as a Member of Parliament until 1993. He also served as the Leader of the Hedmark Conservatives from 1976 to 1982.
