= Rolf Arthur Hansen =

Norwegian politician

Rolf Hansen

Minister of Nordic Cooperation
- In office 3 October 1980 – 14 October 1981
- Prime Minister: Odvar Nordli; Gro Harlem Brundtland
- Preceded by: Bjartmar Gjerde
- Succeeded by: Arne Skauge

Minister of the Environment
- In office 8 October 1979 – 14 October 1981
- Prime Minister: Odvar Nordli; Gro Harlem Brundtland
- Preceded by: Gro Harlem Brundtland
- Succeeded by: Wenche Frogn Sellæg

Minister of Defence
- In office 15 January 1976 – 8 October 1979
- Prime Minister: Odvar Nordli
- Preceded by: Alv J. Fostervoll
- Succeeded by: Thorvald Stoltenberg

Personal details
- Born: Rolf Arthur Hansen; 23 July 1920 Torshov, Oslo, Norway
- Died: 26 July 2006 (aged 86) Oslo, Norway
- Party: Labour

Rolf Arthur Hansen (23 July 1920 – 26 July 2006) was a Norwegian politician for the Labour Party. He was personal secretary to Minister of Social Affairs 1956–1959, Minister of Defence 1976–1979, and Minister of Environmental Affairs 1979–1981, as well as minister of Nordic cooperation 1980–1981.

Political offices
Preceded by Alv Jakob Fostervoll	Norwegian Minister of Defence; 1976–1979	Succeeded by Thorvald Stoltenberg
Preceded by Gro Harlem Brundtland	Norwegian Minister of the Environment; 1979–1981	Succeeded by Wenche Frogn Sellæg
