= 1977 Norwegian parliamentary election =

- 11 and 12 September 1977

All 155 seats in the Storting 78 seats needed for a majority
- Turnout: 82.9%
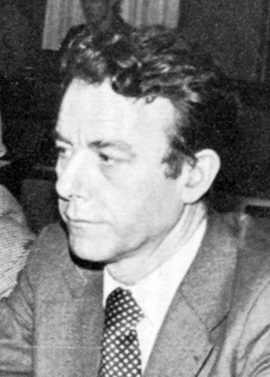

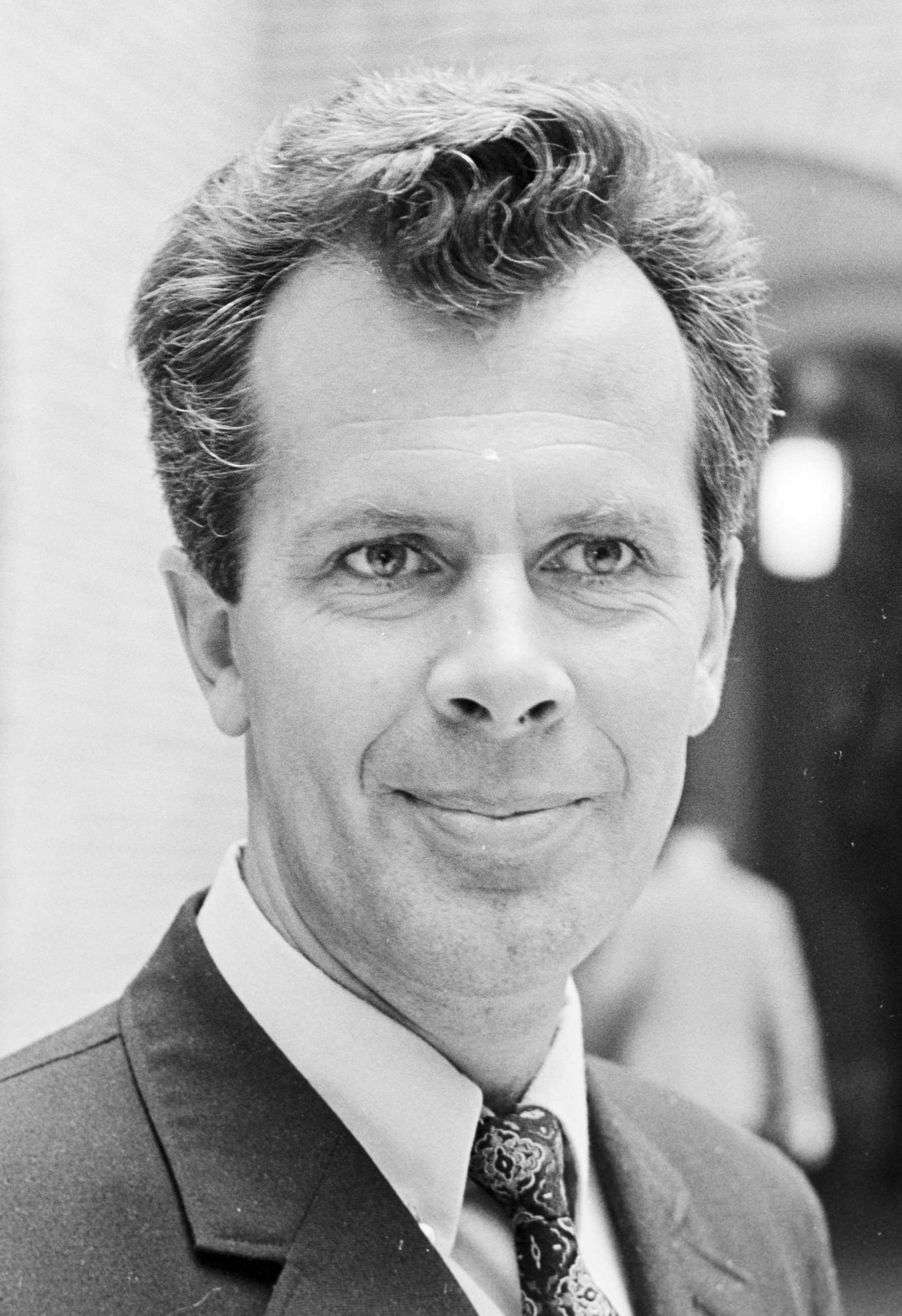

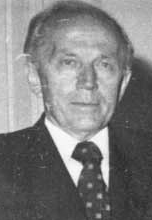

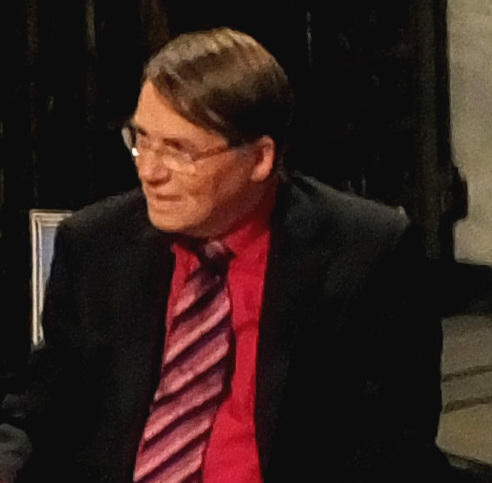

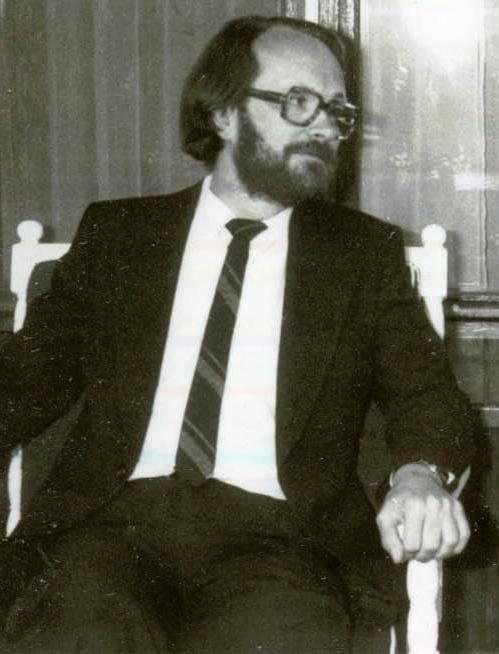

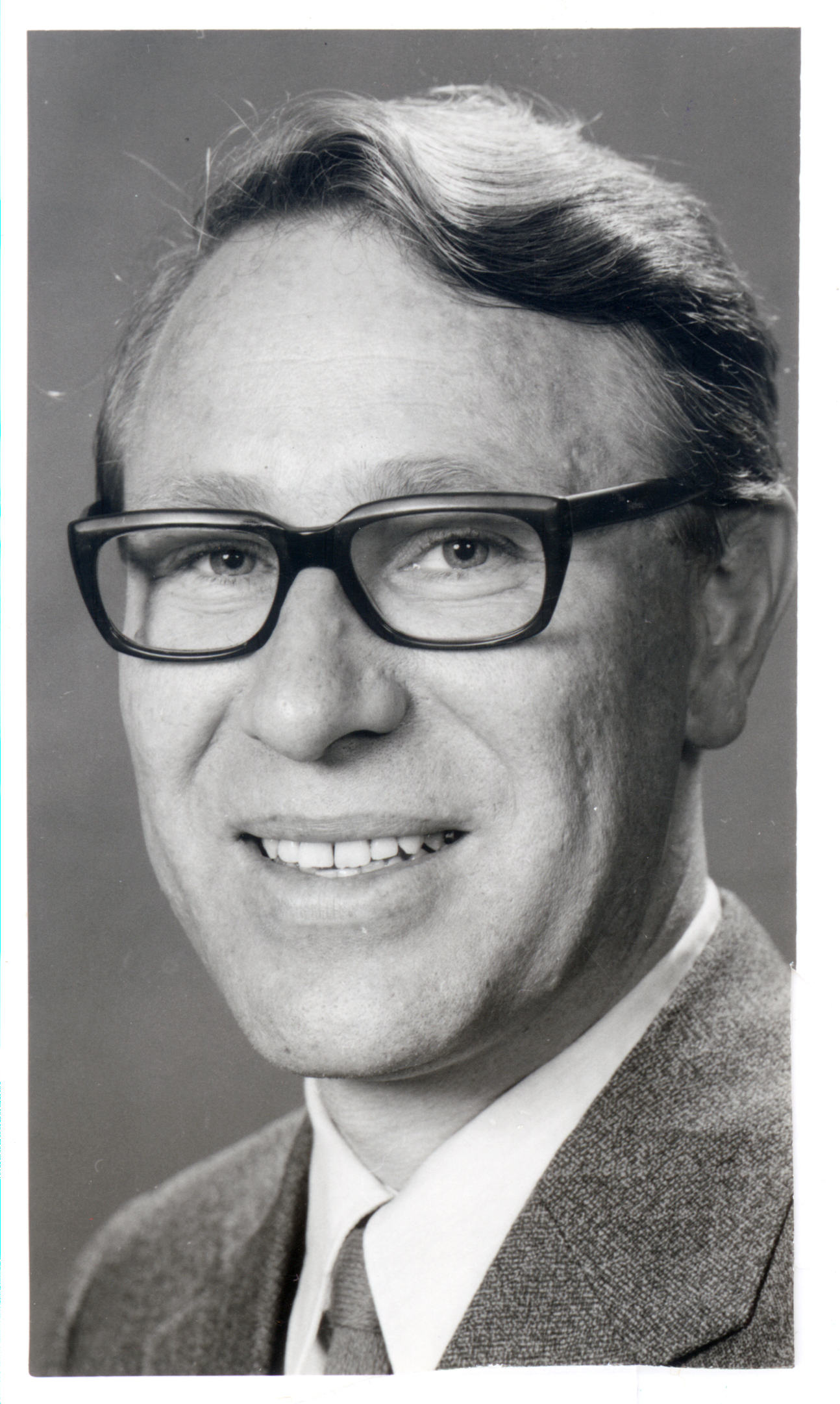
	First party	Second party	Third party
Leader	Reiulf Steen	Erling Norvik	Lars Korvald
Party	Labour	Conservative	Christian Democratic
Last election	35.3%, 62 seats	17.2%, 29 seats	11.9%, 20 seats
Seats won	76	41	22
Seat change	▲14	▲12	▲2
Popular vote	972,434	563,783	224,355
Percentage	42.5%	24.5%	9.7%
Swing	▲7.2pp	▲7.3pp	▼2.2pp
	Fourth party	Fifth party	Sixth party
Leader	Gunnar Stålsett	Berge Furre	Hans Hammond Rossbach
Party	Centre	Socialist Left	Liberal
Last election	6.8%, 21 seats	11.2%, 16 seats (Note: As the Socialist Electoral League)	2.3%, 2 seats
Seats won	12	2	2
Seat change	▼9	▼14	Steady
Popular vote	184,087	96,248	54,243
Percentage	8.0%	4.2%	2.4%
Swing	▲1.2pp	▼7.0pp	▲0.1pp
- Largest bloc and seats won by constituency
Prime Minister before election
Odvar Nordli
Labour
Prime Minister after election
Odvar Nordli
Labour

Parliamentary elections were held in Norway on 11 and 12 September 1977. The Labour Party remained the largest party in the Storting, winning 76 of the 155 seats.

== Contesting parties ==
Name		Ideology	Position	Leader	1973 result	
Name		Ideology	Position	Leader	Votes (%)	Seats
Ap	Labour Party; Arbeiderpartiet	Social democracy	Centre-left	Reiulf Steen	35.2%	62 / 155
H	Conservative Party; Høyre	Conservatism	Centre-right	Erling Norvik	17.2%	29 / 155
KrF	Christian Democratic Party; Kristelig Folkeparti	Christian democracy	Centre to centre-right	Lars Korvald	11.8%	20 / 155
SV	Socialist Left Party; Sosialistisk Venstreparti	Democratic socialism	Left-wing	Berge Furre	11.2%	16 / 155
Sp	Centre Party; Senterpartiet	Agrarianism	Centre	Gunnar Stålsett	6.8%	21 / 155
FrP	Progress Party; Fremskrittspartiet	Classical liberalism Right-libertarianism	Right-wing	Arve Lønnum	5.0%	4 / 155
DLF	New People's Party; Det Liberale Folkepartiet	Social liberalism Pro-Europeanism	Centre	Magne Lerheim	3.4%	1 / 155
V	Liberal Party; Venstre	Social liberalism	Centre	Hans Hammond Rossbach	2.3%	2 / 155

== Campaign ==
=== Slogans ===
Party	Original slogan	English translation
Labour Party	"Vekst og vern - demokrati og likestilling"	"Growth and protection - democracy and equality"
Conservative Party		
Centre Party		
Christian Democratic Party		
Liberal Party		
Communist Party of Norway		

=== Debates ===
1977 Norwegian general election debates
Date	Organisers	P Present I Invitee N Non-invitee									
Date	Organisers	Ap	H	KrF	Sv	Sp	Frp	Dlp	V	NKP	Refs
8 September	NRK	P Reiulf Steen, Odvar Nordli	P Erling Norvik	P Lars Korvald	P Berge Furre	P Gunnar Stålsett	P Arve Lønnum	P Magne Lerheim	P Hans Hammond Rossbach	P Martin Gunnar Knutsen	
12 September	NRK	P Reiulf Steen, Odvar Nordli	P Kåre Willoch	P Lars Korvald	P Reidar T. Larsen	P Gunnar Stålsett	P Arve Lønnum	P Magne Lerheim	P Hans Hammond Rossbach	P Martin Gunnar Knutsen	

== Results ==
Party	Votes	%	Seats	+/–
Labour Party	972,434	42.26	76	+14
Conservative Party	563,783	24.50	40	+12
Christian Democratic Party	224,355	9.75	18	+2
Centre Party	184,087	8.00	11	–9
Non-socialist joint lists (Note: Seven seats were won by joint lists, of which four went to the Christian Democratic Party, and one each to the Centre Party, the Conservative Party and the Liberal Party.)	111,412	4.84	7	–
Socialist Left Party	96,248	4.18	2	–14
Liberal Party	54,243	2.36	1	0
Progress Party	43,351	1.88	0	–4
New People's Party	22,524	0.98	0	–1
Red Electoral Alliance	14,515	0.63	0	0
Communist Party	8,448	0.37	0	–
Single Person's Party	2,740	0.12	0	0
Democratic Party	1,322	0.06	0	0
Freely Elected Representatives	1,149	0.05	0	New
Lapp People's List	499	0.02	0	0
Total	2,301,110	100.00	155	0
Valid votes	2,301,110	99.85		
Invalid/blank votes	3,386	0.15		
Total votes	2,304,496	100.00		
Registered voters/turnout	2,780,190	82.89		
Source: Nohlen & Stöver

=== Voter demographics ===
Cohort	Percentage of cohort voting for							
Cohort	Ap	H	KrF	Sp	Sv	V	FrP	Others
Total vote	42.5%	24.5%	9.7%	8.0%	4.2%	2.4%	1.88%	
Gender
Females	42.4%	22.5%	12.8%	7.3%	3.8%	2.7%	1.6%	
Males	42.2%	26.6%	6.8%	8.7%	4.5%	2%	2%	
Age
18–30 years old	31.9%	25.5%	5.7%	9.9%	10.3%	3.5%	3.9%	
30-59 years old	45.4%	24.6%	8.4%	6.9%	2.9%	2.2%	1.8%	
60 years old and older	43.3%	23%	15.8%	9%	2.1%	2.1%	0.6%	
Work
low income	38.4%	18.1%	14.2%	13.3%	6.9%	2.7%	0.6%	
Average income	50%	15.5%	9%	8.3%	4.8%	2.7%	2.7%	
High income	36.2%	37%	7%	4.8%	2.3%	1.9%	2.1%	
Education
Primary school	60%	11.9%	11.3%	6.8%	2.8%	1.2%	1.8%	
High school	38.2%	28.2%	9.1%	9.6%	3.8%	3%	1.9%	
University/college	15.2%	40.2%	8.9%	5.4%	8.9%	3.1%	2.2%	
Source: Norwegian Institute for Social Research

=== Seat distribution ===
Constituency	Total seats	Seats won					
Constituency	Total seats	Ap	H	KrF	Sp	SV	V
Akershus	10	4	4	1	1		
Aust-Agder	4	2	1	1			
Buskerud	7	4	2	1			
Finnmark	4	3	1				
Hedmark	8	6	1		1		
Hordaland	15	6	5	3	1		
Møre og Romsdal	10	3	2	3	1		1
Nord-Trøndelag	6	3	1		2		
Nordland	12	6	2	2	1	1	
Oppland	7	4	1	1	1		
Oslo	15	7	6	1		1	
Østfold	8	5	2	1			
Rogaland	10	4	3	2	1		
Sogn og Fjordane	5	2	1	1	1		
Sør-Trøndelag	10	5	2	1	1		1
Telemark	6	4	1	1			
Troms	6	3	2	1			
Vest-Agder	5	2	1	1	1		
Vestfold	7	3	3	1			
Total	155	76	41	22	12	2	2
Source: Norges Offisielle Statistikk
