= Asbjørn Haugstvedt =

Norwegian politician

Minister of Trade and Shipping
- In office 8 June 1983 – 9 May 1986
- Prime Minister: Kåre Willoch
- Preceded by: Arne Skauge
- Succeeded by: Kurt Mosbakk

Minister of Nordic Cooperation
- In office 8 June 1983 – 9 May 1986
- Prime Minister: Kåre Willoch
- Preceded by: Arne Skauge
- Succeeded by: Bjarne Mørk-Eidem

President of the Odelsting
- In office 11 October 1977 – 30 September 1981
- Vice President: Per Karstensen
- Preceded by: Per Borten
- Succeeded by: Arne Nilsen

Member of the Norwegian Parliament
- In office 1 October 1969 – 30 September 1985
- Constituency: Bergen (1969-1973); Hordaland (1973-1985)

Personal details
- Born: 20 November 1926 Bergen, Hordaland, Norway
- Died: 26 June 2008 (aged 87) Bergen, Hordaland, Norway
- Party: Christian Democratic

Asbjørn Haugstvedt (20 November 1926 – 26 June 2008) was a Norwegian politician for the Christian Democratic Party. He was President of the Odelsting 1977–1981 and Minister of Trade and Shipping 1983–1986, as well as minister of Nordic cooperation 1983–1986. Haugstvedt was also a member of the Norwegian Parliament in the period from 1969 to 1985.

Political offices
Preceded by Arne Skauge	Norwegian Minister of Trade and Shipping; 1983–1986	Succeeded by Kurt Mosbakk
