= Arne Skauge =

Norwegian politician

Minister of Finance
- In office 16 October 1989 – 3 November 1990
- Prime Minister: Jan P. Syse
- Preceded by: Gunnar Berge
- Succeeded by: Sigbjørn Johnsen
- In office 25 April 1986 – 9 May 1986
- Prime Minister: Kåre Willoch
- Preceded by: Rolf Presthus
- Succeeded by: Gunnar Berge

Second Deputy Leader of the Conservative Party
- In office 25 August 1984 – 20 April 1986
- Leader: Erling Norvik
- Preceded by: Kaci Kullmann Five
- Succeeded by: Erlend Rian

Minister of Trade and Shipping
- In office 14 October 1981 – 8 June 1983
- Prime Minister: Kåre Willoch
- Preceded by: Kari Gjesteby
- Succeeded by: Asbjørn Haugstvedt

Minister of Nordic Cooperation
- In office 14 October 1981 – 8 June 1983
- Prime Minister: Kåre Willoch
- Preceded by: Rolf A. Hansen
- Succeeded by: Asbjørn Haugstvedt

Personal details
- Born: 27 January 1948 (age 78) Bergen, Norway
- Party: Conservative

Arne Skauge (born 27 January 1948) is a Norwegian politician for the Conservative Party, who served as parliamentary representative for Hordaland from 1977 to 1993. He was also Minister of Trade and Shipping 1981-1983 (as well as minister of Nordic cooperation), state secretary to the Prime Minister 1984–1986, and Minister of Finance in 1986 and 1989–1990.

Political offices
Preceded by Gunnar Berge	Norwegian Minister of Finance; 1989–1990	Succeeded by Sigbjørn Johnsen
Preceded by Rolf Presthus	Norwegian Minister of Finance; 1986	Succeeded by Gunnar Berge
Preceded by Kari Gjesteby	Norwegian Minister of Trade and Shipping; 1981–1983	Succeeded by Asbjørn Haugstvedt
