= Deputy to the Prime Minister of Norway =

The Deputy to the Prime Minister of Norway (Norwegian: Norges stedfortredende statsminister) was an office in the second cabinet of Kåre Willoch (1985-1986) and the first cabinet of Kjell Magne Bondevik (1997-2000).

From 1905 to 1985, the Minister of Foreign Affairs acted as the Prime Minister's de facto but not de jure deputy. Outside of these periods, other cabinet ministers have acted as unofficial deputies to the Prime Minister, especially from smaller parties in coalitions.

== Deputies ==
Name	Party	Took office	Left office	Tenure	Cabinet
Kjell Magne Bondevik	Christian Democratic	4 October 1985	9 May 1986	217 days	Willoch II
Vacant (9 May 1986 – 17 October 1997)
Anne Enger Lahnstein	Centre Party	17 October 1997	8 October 1999	1 year, 356 days	Bondevik I
Odd Roger Enoksen	Centre Party	8 October 1999	17 March 2000	161 days	Bondevik I
