= Reiulf Steen =

Norwegian politician (1933–2014)

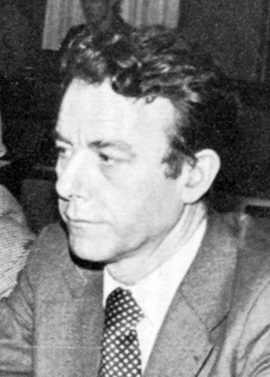

Norwegian Ambassador to Chile
- In office 4 September 1992 – 24 October 1996
- Prime Minister: Gro Harlem Brundtland
- Preceded by: Frode Nilsen
- Succeeded by: Martin Tore Bjørndal

Vice President of the Storting
- In office 9 October 1985 – 30 September 1989
- President: Jo Benkow
- Preceded by: Odvar Nordli
- Succeeded by: Kirsti Kolle Grøndahl

Minister of Trade and Shipping
- In office 8 October 1979 – 4 February 1981
- Prime Minister: Odvar Nordli
- Preceded by: Hallvard Bakke
- Succeeded by: Kari Gjesteby

Minister of Transport and Communications
- In office 17 March 1971 – 18 October 1972
- Prime Minister: Trygve Bratteli
- Preceded by: Håkon Kyllingmark
- Succeeded by: John Austrheim

Leader of the Labour Party
- In office 1975–1981
- Deputy: Gro Harlem Brundtland
- Preceded by: Trygve Bratteli
- Succeeded by: Gro Harlem Brundtland

Member of the Norwegian Parliament
- In office 1 October 1977 – 30 September 1993
- Constituency: Oslo (1977–1985); Akershus (1985–1993)

Personal details
- Born: 16 August 1933 Hurum, Norway
- Died: 5 June 2014 (aged 80) Oslo, Norway
- Party: Labour Party
- Spouse: Inés Vargas
- Children: 4

Reiulf Steen (16 August 1933 – 5 June 2014) was a Norwegian politician with the Norwegian Labour Party. He was active in the Labour Party from 1958 to 1990, serving as deputy party chairman from 1965 to 1975 and chairman from 1975 to 1981. Steen served as Norwegian ambassador to Chile between 1992 and 1996.

== Biography ==
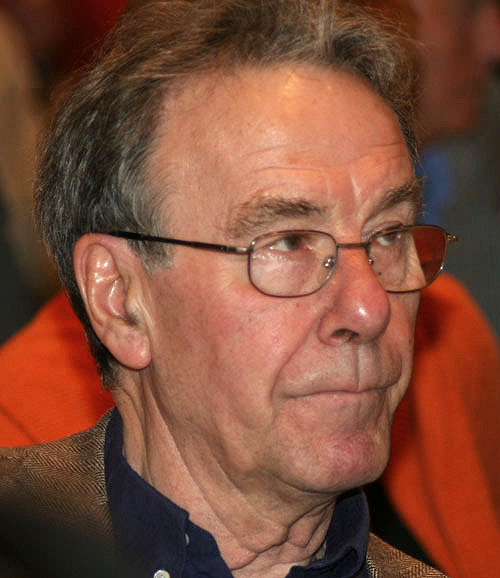
Steen in 2007

He was born at Hurum in Buskerud, Norway. His parents were Nils Steen (1889–1941) and Astrid Karlsen (1899–1986). The father, who died when Reiulf was 7 years old, had been president of the Norwegian Chemical Industry Workers' Union and deputy mayor of the municipality.

Steen was elected leader of the regional Labour Party affiliate at age 14. He had worked in a factory and as a journalist for the newspaper Fremtiden in Drammen before entering politics in 1958. He rose quickly through the ranks of his party, chairing the Workers' Youth League from 1961 to 1964.

He later served as minister of transportation from 1971 to 1972 and minister of commerce and trade from 1979 to 1981. From 1977 to 1993 he was a member of Parliament, representing the constituencies Oslo and Akershus. He was the vice president of the Socialist International from 1978 to 1983 and chaired its committee on Chile from 1975 to 1990. He maintained a long-standing interest in Latin America and was appointed Norwegian ambassador to Chile in 1992, a tenure that lasted until 1996.

He wrote columns for several of the country's leading newspapers, dealing with both national and international issues. He was also active in ATTAC and chaired the Norwegian branch of the European Movement (1999–2001), Norsk Folkehjelp (1999–2003) and the Norwegian branch of the Helsinki Committee for Human Rights (1986–1992). In later years, his memoirs and personal recollections related accounts of his own psychiatric problems and difficulties within the Labour Party.

== Personal life ==
Reiulf Steen was married twice. In 1960 he married Lis Fridholm (1936–1985). Their marriage was later dissolved. In 1980 he married Inés Vargas, a native of Chile. His wife's background was part of the reason Steen was appointed Norwegian ambassador to Chile in 1992.

He died on 5 June 2014 and was survived by his wife, four children from his first marriage and step-family. Via his step-daughter, he was father-in-law to Labour politician Raymond Johansen, who was Governing Mayor of Oslo. Steen was non-religious. His grandson, Mats, who was born with Duchenne muscular dystrophy, was the subject of the 2024 documentary The Remarkable Life of Ibelin.

== Bibliography ==
- Ørnen har landet, 2003
- Jordskjelv, 2000
- Underveis, 1999
- Beretninger, 1998
- Ideene lever, 1992
- Maktkamp, 1989
- Inés – og det elskede landet, 1988
- Der hjertet banker, 1986

== See also ==
- Gro Harlem Brundtland
- Trygve Bratteli

Political offices
Preceded by Håkon Olai Kyllingmark	Norwegian Minister of Transport and Communications; 1972–1973	Succeeded by John Austrheim
Preceded by Hallvard Bakke	Norwegian Minister of Trade and Shipping; 1979–1981	Succeeded by Kari Gjesteby
Party political offices
Preceded by Bjartmar Gjerde	Chairman of the Workers' Youth League; 1961–1964	Succeeded by Ola Teigen
Preceded by Trygve Bratteli	Chairman of the Norwegian Labour Party; 1975–1981	Succeeded by Gro Harlem Brundtland
