= Anders C. Sjaastad =

Norwegian politician

Member of the Norwegian Parliament
- In office 1 October 1993 – 30 September 1997
- Constituency: Oslo

Minister of Defence
- In office 14 October 1981 – 25 April 1986
- Prime Minister: Kåre Willoch
- Preceded by: Thorvald Stoltenberg
- Succeeded by: Rolf Presthus

Personal details
- Born: Anders Christian Sjaastad; 21 February 1942 (age 84) Oslo, Reichskommissariat Norwegen (today Norway)
- Party: Conservative Party

Anders Christian Sjaastad (born 21 February 1942) is a Norwegian politician for the Conservative Party, and a parliamentary representative for Oslo from 1993 to 1997. He was Minister of Defense from 1981 to 1986.

Government offices
Preceded by Thorvald Stoltenberg	Norwegian Minister of Defence; 1981–1986	Succeeded by Rolf Presthus
