= Erlend Rian =

Norwegian politician (1941–2020)

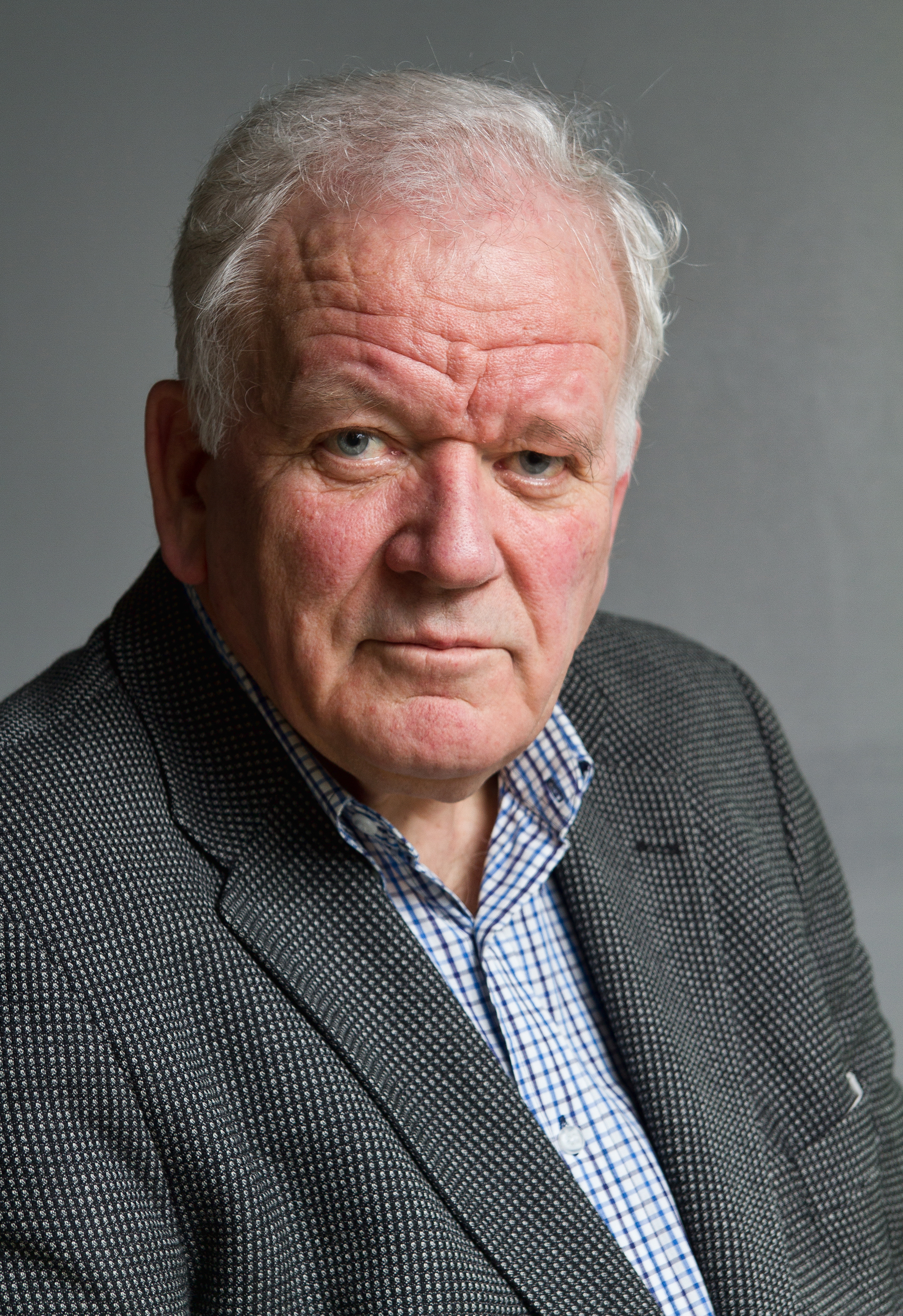
Portrait of Erlend Rian

Erlend Rian (15 June 1941 – 1 December 2020) was a Norwegian politician who represented the Conservative Party.

He was editor-in-chief of the newspaper Tromsø from 1974 to 1979, and mayor of Tromsø city from 1980 to 1995. From 1984 to 1988 he was the second deputy leader of the Conservative Party nationwide. He left the Conservative Party in 2005, but was involved in Tromsø 2018.

He was the older brother of historian Øystein Rian.
