= Rolf Presthus =

Norwegian politician

Leader of the Conservative Party
- In office 20 April 1986 – 1 January 1988
- First Deputy: Kaci Kullmann Five
- Second Deputy: Erlend Rian
- Preceded by: Erling Norvik
- Succeeded by: Jan P. Syse

Minister of Defence
- In office 25 April 1986 – 9 May 1986
- Prime Minister: Kåre Willoch
- Preceded by: Anders Sjaastad
- Succeeded by: Johan Jørgen Holst

Minister of Finance
- In office 14 October 1981 – 25 April 1986
- Prime Minister: Kåre Willoch
- Preceded by: Ulf Sand
- Succeeded by: Arne Skauge

Member of the Norwegian Parliament
- In office 1 October 1969 – 1 January 1988
- Constituency: Akershus

Mayor of Oppegård
- In office 1 January 1968 – 1 October 1969
- Preceded by: Erling Erichsen
- Succeeded by: Tore Haugen

Personal details
- Born: 29 July 1936 Oslo, Norway
- Died: 1 January 1988 (aged 51) Oslo, Norway
- Party: Conservative
- Spouse: Kari Modahl (m. 1963)

Rolf Presthus (29 July 1936 – 1 January 1988) was a Norwegian politician and lawyer, who was chairman of the Norwegian Conservative Party from 1986 to 1988.

Presthus served as Minister of Finance 1981–1986, and Minister of Defence in 1986. He was a member of parliament from Akershus from 1969 to 1988, and mayor of Oppegård from 1968 to 1969.

At the Conservative party conference in 1987 he became the first Norwegian politician to use a teleprompter during a speech. He received widespread criticism and accusations, both for cheating and contributing to the Americanization of Norwegian politics.

Presthus died in Oslo at the age of 51 on 1 January 1988, due to a cerebral hemorrhage.

Political offices
Preceded by Ulf Sand	Norwegian Minister of Finance; 1981–1986	Succeeded by Arne Skauge
Preceded by Anders C. Sjaastad	Norwegian Minister of Defence; 1986–1986	Succeeded by Johan Jørgen Holst
