= Odvar Nordli =

Prime Minister of Norway from 1976 to 1981

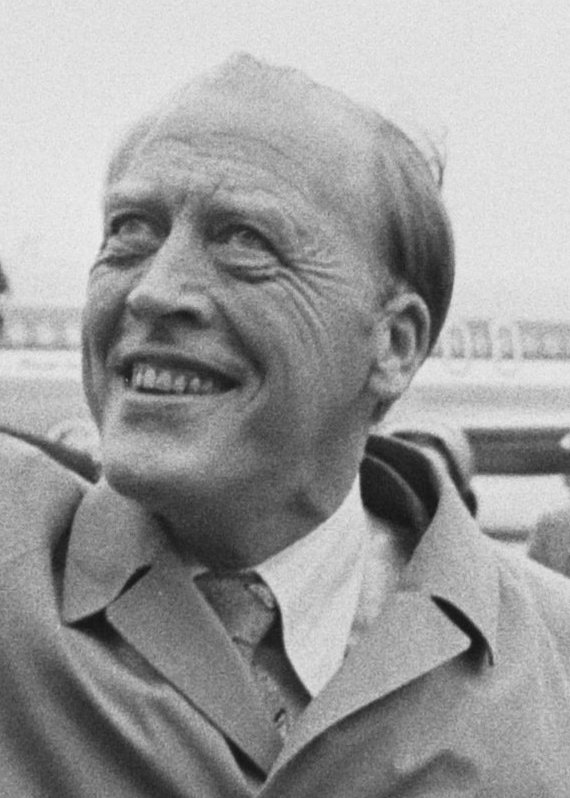
- Nordli in 1976

Prime Minister of Norway
- In office 15 January 1976 – 4 February 1981
- Monarch: Olav V
- Preceded by: Trygve Bratteli
- Succeeded by: Gro Harlem Brundtland

County Governor of Hedmark
- In office 11 March 1981 – 17 September 1994
- Preceded by: Anfinn Lund
- Succeeded by: Kjell Borgen

Vice President of the Storting
- In office 8 October 1981 – 30 September 1985
- President: Per Hysing-Dahl
- Preceded by: Svenn Stray
- Succeeded by: Reiulf Steen

Minister of Local Government
- In office 17 March 1971 – 18 October 1972
- Prime Minister: Trygve Bratteli
- Preceded by: Helge Rognlien
- Succeeded by: Johan Skipnes

Member of the Norwegian Parliament
- In office 1 October 1961 – 30 September 1981
- Constituency: Hedmark

Member of the Norwegian Nobel Committee
- In office 1985–1996

Personal details
- Born: 3 November 1927 Tangen, Hedmark, Norway
- Died: 9 January 2018 (aged 90) Oslo, Norway
- Party: Labour
- Spouse: Marit Haraseth (m. 1953; died 2010)
- Children: 2
- Education: University of Oslo
- Awards: Order of St. Olav

Military service
- Allegiance: Norway
- Branch/service: Norwegian Army
- Years of service: 1948
- Rank: Corporal
- Battles/wars: Cold War

Odvar Nordli (3 November 1927 – 9 January 2018) was a Norwegian politician from the Labour Party. He was the prime minister of Norway from 1976 to 1981. Before serving as prime minister, Nordli served as the minister of local government from 1971 to 1972.

After serving as prime minister, Nordli served as the vice president of the Storting from 1981 until 1985, and was also a member of the Norwegian Nobel Committee from 1985 until 1996.

== Early life ==
The son of a railroad worker, Eugen Nordli (1904–1992) and housewife Marie (1902–1984), (née Jørgensen), Nordli grew up in Tangen in Stange Municipality in Hedmark county. After World War II he served in the Independent Norwegian Brigade Group in Germany, part of the Allied forces occupying post-war Germany.

By education he became a certified accountant before entering politics, and worked in this field until 1961. He served as deputy mayor of Stange municipality from 1951 to 1963.

== Early political career ==
He was elected to the Norwegian Parliament from Hedmark in 1961, and was re-elected on five occasions. He had previously served in the position of deputy representative during the terms 1954–1957 and 1958–1961.

Nordli became a cabinet member in 1971, serving as Minister of Local Government in the first cabinet Bratteli.

At the Labour Party Congress in 1975 both Nordli and Reiulf Steen candidated to replace Trygve Bratteli as new leader. A compromise was worked out that made Steen the new party leader while Nordli was designated as the party's new prime minister. This became a strained arrangement and they never cooperated well.

== Prime Minister of Norway ==
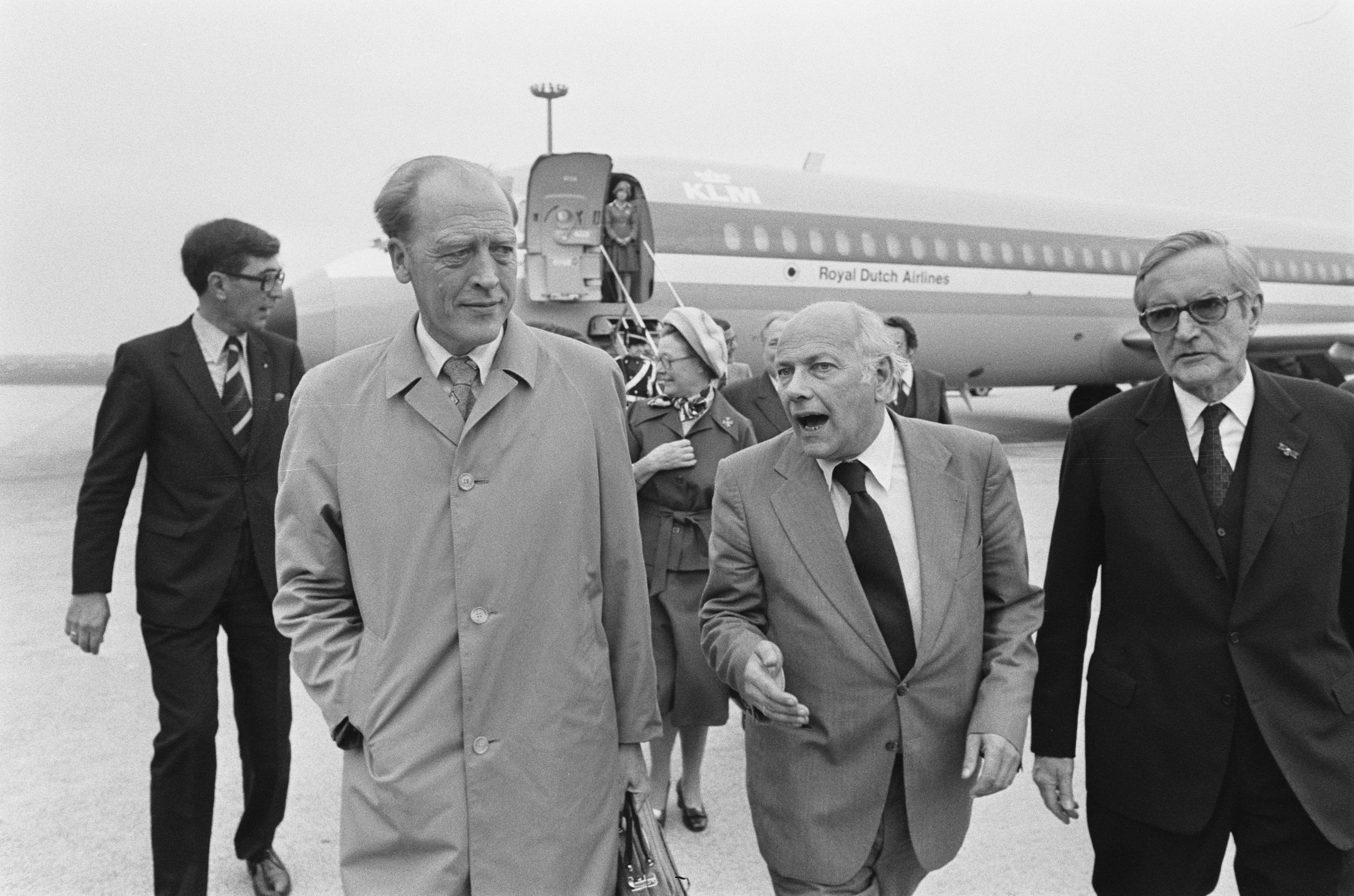
Odvar Nordli and Dutch prime minister Joop den Uyl (1976)

Nordli became Prime Minister in 1976, heading the cabinet Nordli which succeeded the second cabinet Bratteli. He contributed to the elaboration of the NATO Double-Track Decision to deploy medium- and intermediate-range ballistic missiles in Western Europe while also actively seeking to negotiate an arms control agreement with the Soviet Union, although in accordance with Norwegian policy, he declined to deploy any missiles on Norwegian soil. His premiership was also marked by the national controversy over the damming of the Alta-Kautokeino river.

In social policy, Nordli's premiership in 1978 saw improved sickness benefits to 100% wage compensation from day one of sickness for up to 52 weeks. The previous law had not had any compensation for ordinary workers for the first 3 days and 90% compensation after that time. The same year the Abortion Act of 1975 was liberalized and women were granted the right to decide on their own to have an abortion until the end of week 12 after gestation. In the original act approval of a committee of doctors had been required in order to have an abortion.

The Nordli cabinet under Minister of Finance Per Kleppe continued a Keynesian fiscal policy with deficit spending where Norway loaned abroad against future oil income. Wages increased more than in other countries, leading to Norwegian businesses becoming less competitive. In September 1978, the government through a provisional law imposed a general ban on wage and price increases. The law was in effect through 1979. The cabinet also partly reversed the expansive fiscal policy.

As for foreign relations during the Nordli premiership, Norway established a 200 nautical miles exclusive economic zone in 1977 where Norway claimed exclusive rights to marine resources. This caused complications with the Soviet Union that also had a 200 nm fishery zone. In 1978, Maritime law minister, Jens Evensen stated that Norway and the Soviet Union agreed on a one year Grey Zone Agreement which was subsequently renewed until it was replaced with a permanent agreement in 2010.

The 1977 Norwegian parliamentary election less than a year into Nordli's premiership was a success for Nordli and the Labour Party which continued in position, but the 1979 Norwegian local elections was a set-back, partly due to the economic situation and it weakened Nordli's position.

Nordli started experiencing health problems about two years into his premiership and in 1981 his doctor advised him to take a sick leave. This leaked to the media before Nordli had made any decision and as a result he was soon after replaced by Gro Harlem Brundtland and another Labour cabinet, Brundtland's First Cabinet.

== Later career ==
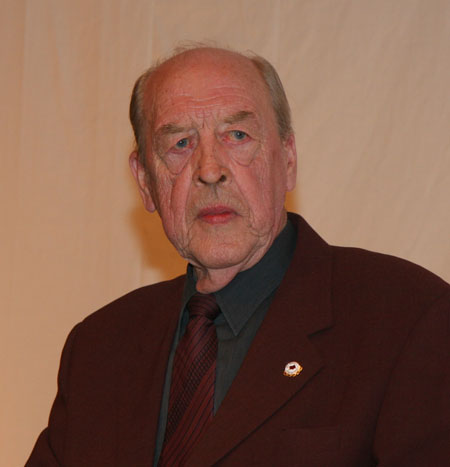
Nordli in April 2007, aged around 80-81

After retiring as prime minister in 1981, he was elected vice president of the Storting. He served as vice president until 1985.

His career ended with the post of County Governor of Hedmark, which he held from 1981 until his retirement in 1993. He was also a member of the Norwegian Nobel Committee from 1985 to 1993.

After retiring, Nordli had a number of books published which included autobiographical writings and lighter stories about politics, daily life and nature.

== Personal life ==
Nordli met his wife Marit Haraseth (27 April 1932–3 October 2010) during a Hedmark divisional committee Labour Party youth wing meet. They married in 1953, had two daughters and lived in Stange until their respective deaths in 2010 and 2018.

Nordli died on 9 January 2018 of prostate cancer in Oslo at the age of 90. His state funeral was held on 19 January 2018.

== Awards ==
- Commander of the Order of St. Olav (1994)

== Selected works ==
- Langs veg og sti, Gyldendal, 1984
- Min vei, Tiden, 1985
- Morgenlandet, Damm, 1991
- Vi så kornmoglansen, Tiden, 1994
- Storting og småting, Tiden, 1996
- Skråblikk fra godstolen, Trysil-forlaget, 2006
- With Kåre Willoch: Alvorlig talt: samtaler om politikk, Aschehoug, 2008

== See also ==
- Trygve Bratteli
- Gro Harlem Brundtland

Political offices
Preceded by Helge Rognlien	Norwegian Minister of Local Government; 1971–1972	Succeeded by Johan Skipnes
Preceded by Trygve Bratteli	Prime Minister of Norway; 1976–1981	Succeeded by Gro Harlem Brundtland
Preceded by Anfinn Lund	County Governor of Hedmark; 1981–1993	Succeeded by Kjell Borgen
