= Gro Harlem Brundtland =

Norwegian politician (born 1939)

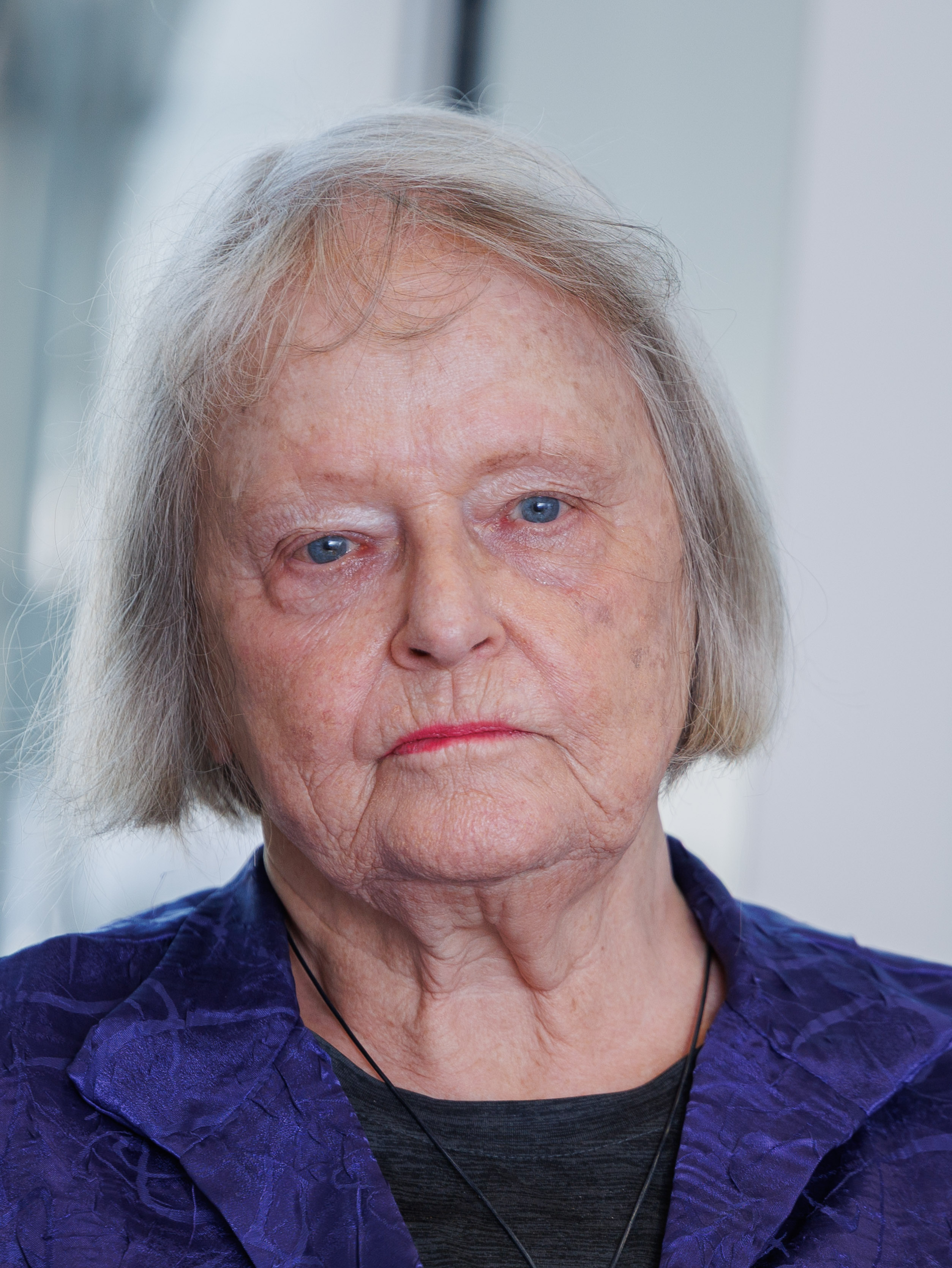
- Harlem Brundtland in 2025

Prime Minister of Norway
- In office 3 November 1990 – 25 October 1996
- Monarchs: Olav V Harald V
- Preceded by: Jan P. Syse
- Succeeded by: Thorbjørn Jagland
- In office 9 May 1986 – 16 October 1989
- Monarch: Olav V
- Preceded by: Kåre Willoch
- Succeeded by: Jan P. Syse
- In office 4 February 1981 – 14 October 1981
- Monarch: Olav V
- Preceded by: Odvar Nordli
- Succeeded by: Kåre Willoch

Director-General of the World Health Organization
- In office 13 May 1998 – 21 July 2003
- Secretary-General: Kofi Annan
- Preceded by: Hiroshi Nakajima
- Succeeded by: Lee Jong-wook

Leader of the Labour Party
- In office 1981–1992
- Preceded by: Reiulf Steen
- Succeeded by: Thorbjørn Jagland

Minister of the Environment
- In office 6 September 1974 – 8 October 1979
- Prime Minister: Trygve Bratteli; Odvar Nordli
- Preceded by: Tor Halvorsen
- Succeeded by: Rolf A. Hansen

Member of the Norwegian Parliament
- In office 1 October 1977 – 30 September 1997
- Deputy: Sissel Rønbeck; Ivar Ødegaard; Marit Nybakk; Bjørn Tore Godal; Rune E. Kristiansen
- Constituency: Oslo

Personal details
- Born: Gro Harlem; 20 April 1939 (age 87) Bærum, Norway
- Party: Labour
- Spouse: Arne Brundtland (m. 1960; died 2024)
- Children: 4
- Parent(s): Gudmund Harlem; Inga Brynolf
- Education: University of Oslo (Cand.Med.); Harvard University (MPH)
- Harlem Brundtland's voice Harlem Brundtland speaking on AIDS, malaria and tuberculosis prevention Recorded 28 September 2000

Gro Brundtland (Norwegian pronunciation: [ˈɡruː ˈhɑ̀ːlɛm ˈbrʉ̀ntlɑnː]; née Harlem; born 20 April 1939), known as Gro Harlem Brundtland, is a Norwegian stateswoman and former physician, who thrice served as the Prime Minister of Norway (1981, 1986–1989, and 1990–1996), and as the leader of the Labour Party from 1981 to 1992, and as the director-general of the World Health Organization from 1998 to 2003. She is also known for having chaired the Brundtland Commission which presented the Brundtland Report on sustainable development.

Educated as a physician, Brundtland joined the Labour Party and entered the government in 1974 as Minister of the Environment. She became the first female prime minister of Norway on 4 February 1981, but left office on 14 October 1981; she returned as prime minister on 9 May 1986 and served until 16 October 1989. She finally returned for her third term on 3 November 1990. After her surprise resignation as prime minister in 1996, she became an international leader in sustainable development and public health, and served as director-general of the World Health Organization and as UN special envoy on Climate Change from 2007 to 2010. She is also deputy chair of The Elders and a former vice-president of Socialist International.

Brundtland belonged to the moderate wing of her party and supported Norwegian membership in the European Union during the 1994 referendum. As prime minister, Brundtland became widely known as the "mother of the nation". Brundtland received the 1994 Charlemagne Prize, and has received many other awards and recognitions.

== Early life ==
Gro Harlem was born in Oslo in 1939, the daughter of physician and politician Gudmund Harlem and Inga Margareta Elisabet Brynolf (1918–2005). She has a younger brother, Lars and a younger sister, Hanne.

In 1963, Brundtland graduated with a medical degree, a cand.med. from the University of Oslo. She took her master's degree at Harvard University in 1965, as a Master of Public Health.

From 1966 to 1969, she worked as a physician at the Directorate of Health (Helsedirektoratet), and from 1969 she worked as a doctor in Oslo's public school health service.

== Political career ==
Brundtland was minister for environmental affairs from 1974 to 1979.

=== Prime minister of Norway ===
Brundtland became Norway's first female prime minister in 1981. She served as prime minister from February to October.

At 41 years old she was the youngest person to become Prime Minister of Norway.

Brundtland served as prime minister for two further, and more durable, terms. The second ministry was from 9 May 1986 until 16 October 1989 and this cabinet became known worldwide for its high proportion of female ministers: nearly half, or eight of the total eighteen ministers, were female. The third ministry was from 3 November 1990 to 25 October 1996.

Brundtland became leader of the Labour Party in 1981 and held the office until resigning in 1992, during her third term as prime minister. In 1996, she resigned from office and retired completely from politics. Her successor as both Labour Party leader in 1992 and as prime minister in 1996 was Thorbjørn Jagland.

=== Local politics ===
Brundtland returned to politics when she became a candidate to the Oslo City Council for the 2023 local elections. She ultimately won a seat in the council.

== International career ==
In 1983, Brundtland was invited by then United Nations Secretary-General Javier Pérez de Cuéllar to establish and chair the World Commission on Environment and Development (WCED), widely referred to as the Brundtland Commission. She developed the broad political concept of sustainable development in the course of extensive public hearings, that were distinguished by their inclusiveness. The commission, which published its report, Our Common Future, in April 1987, provided the momentum for the 1992 Earth Summit/UNCED, which was headed by Maurice Strong, who had been a prominent member of the commission. The Brundtland Commission also provided momentum for Agenda 21.

During her third ministry, the Norwegian government in 1993 took the initiative to sponsor secret peace talks between the Government of Israel led by Yitzchak Rabin – like Brundtland, leader of a Labour Party – and the PLO led by Yasser Arafat. This culminated with the signing of the Oslo Accords. For several years afterwards, Norway continued to have a high-profile involvement in promoting Israeli-Palestinian peace, though increasingly displaced by the United States from its role as the mediator.

After the end of her term as PM, Brundtland was then elected Director-General of the World Health Organization in May 1998. In this capacity, Brundtland adopted a far-reaching approach to public health, establishing a Commission on Macroeconomics and Health, chaired by Jeffrey Sachs, and addressing violence as a major public health issue. Brundtland spearheaded the movement, now worldwide, to achieve the abolition of cigarette smoking by education, persuasion, and increased taxation. Under her leadership, the World Health Organization was one of the first major employers to make quitting smoking a condition of employment. Under Brundtland's leadership, the World Health Organization was criticized for increased drug-company influence on the agency.

Brundtland was recognized in 2003 by Scientific American as their 'Policy Leader of the Year' for coordinating a rapid worldwide response to stem outbreaks of SARS. Brundtland was succeeded on 21 July 2003 by Jong-Wook Lee. In 1994, Brundtland was awarded the Charlemagne Prize of the city of Aachen.

In 2006 Brundtland was a member of the Panel of Eminent Persons who reviewed the work of the United Nations Conference on Trade and Development (UNCTAD). In May 2007, UN Secretary-General Ban Ki-moon named Brundtland, as well as Ricardo Lagos (the former president of Chile), and Han Seung-soo (the former foreign minister of South Korea), to serve as UN Special Envoys for Climate Change.

Brundtland's hallmark political activities have been chronicled by her husband, Arne Olav Brundtland, in his two bestsellers, Married to Gro (ISBN 82-516-1647-6) and Still married to Gro (ISBN 82-05-30726-1).

External videos
- https://www.c-span.org/video/?205161-1/michigan-state-university-commencement-address Michigan State University Commencement Address, 2 May 2008], C-SPAN

In 2007, Brundtland was working for Pepsi as a consultant.

Brundtland is a member of the Council of Women World Leaders, an international network of current and former women presidents and prime ministers whose mission is to mobilise collective action on issues of critical importance to women and equitable development.

Brundtland is also a member of the Club of Madrid, an independent organisation of former leaders of democratic states, which works to strengthen democratic governance and leadership.

Brundtland is a founding member of The Elders, a group of world leaders originally convened by Nelson Mandela, Graça Machel and Desmond Tutu in order to tackle some of the world's toughest problems. Mandela announced the launch of the group on 18 July 2007 in Johannesburg, South Africa. Brundtland has been active in The Elders' work, participating in a broad range of the group's initiatives. She has travelled with Elders delegations to Cyprus, the Korean Peninsula, Ethiopia, India and the Middle East. Brundtland has also been involved in The Elders' initiative on child marriage, including the founding of Girls Not Brides: The Global Partnership to End Child Marriage. She was appointed Deputy Chair of the group in 2013 and was succeeded in this role by Ban Ki-moon and Graça Machel in 2018.

Brundtland attended the Bilderberg meetings in 1982 and 1983. Her husband attended in 1991.

In 2019, Brundtland served as co-chair with the WHO Global Preparedness Monitoring Board.

== Assassination attempt ==
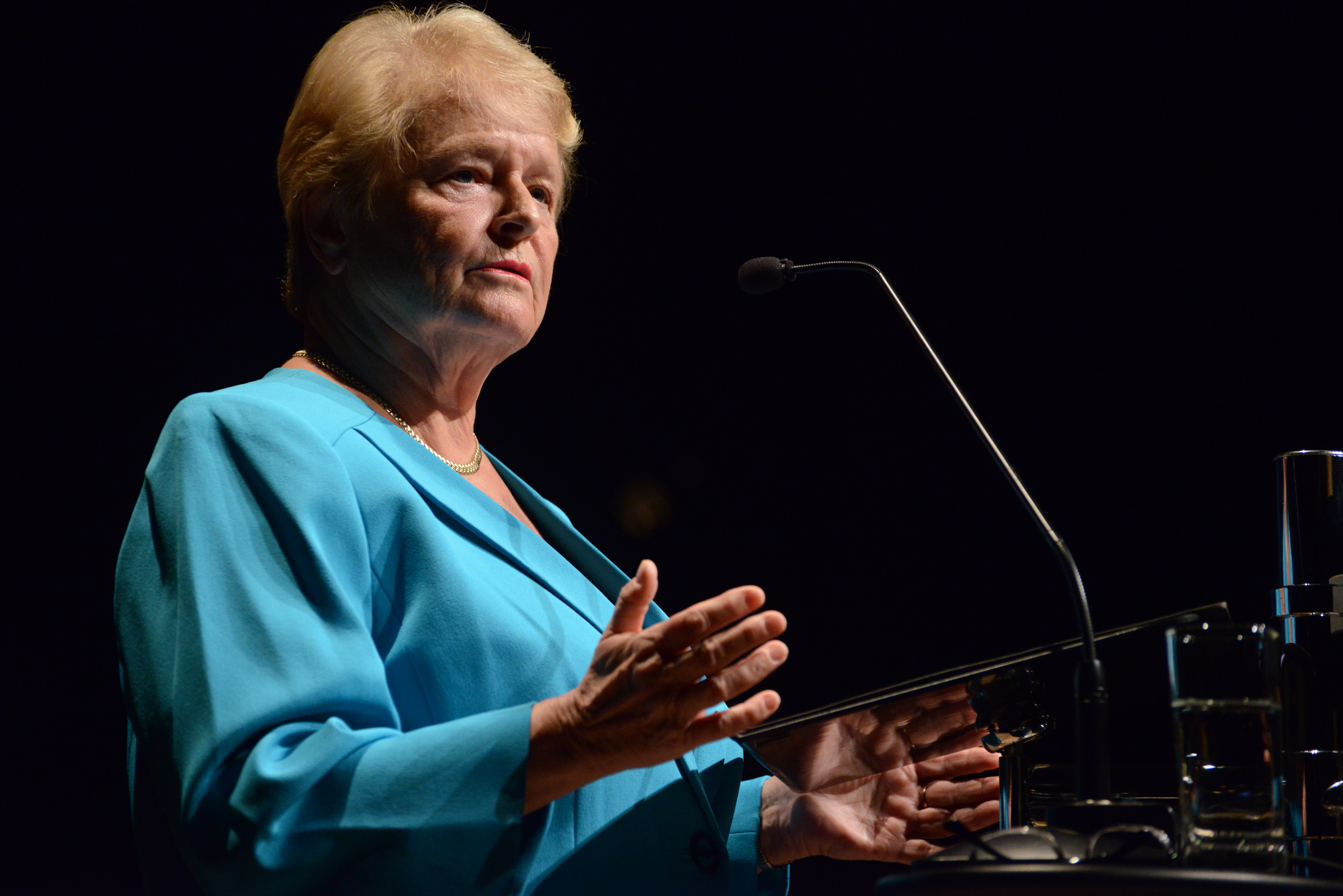
Brundtland speaking at Fronteiras do Pensamento in 2014

Brundtland narrowly escaped assassination by Anders Behring Breivik on 22 July 2011. She had been on the island of Utøya hours before the massacre there to give a speech to the AUF camp; Breivik stated that he originally intended Brundtland to be the main target of the attack (along with Eskil Pedersen and Jonas Gahr Støre), but he had been delayed while travelling from Oslo. Breivik arrived on Utøya about two hours after Brundtland had left.

During his trial in 2012, Breivik revealed detailed assassination plans for Brundtland. He told the court that he had planned to handcuff her and then record himself reading out a prepared text detailing her "crimes", before decapitating her on camera using a bayonet and uploading the footage to the internet. Breivik said that while Brundtland had been his main target, he had still planned to massacre everyone else on the island.

== Personal life ==
She married Arne Olav Brundtland on 9 December 1960. They had four children; one is deceased. They own a house in the south of France.

=== Health issues ===
Brundtland was operated on for uterine cancer in 2002 at Oslo University Hospital, Ullevål. In 2008 it became known that during 2007 she had received two treatments at Ullevål, paid for by Norwegian public expenditures. Since she had previously notified the Norwegian authorities that she had changed residence to France, she was no longer entitled to Norwegian social security benefits. Following media attention surrounding the matter, Brundtland decided to change residence once more, back to Norway, and she also announced that she would be paying for the treatments herself. Brundtland has claimed to suffer from electrical sensitivity which causes headaches when someone uses a mobile phone near her.

== Honours ==
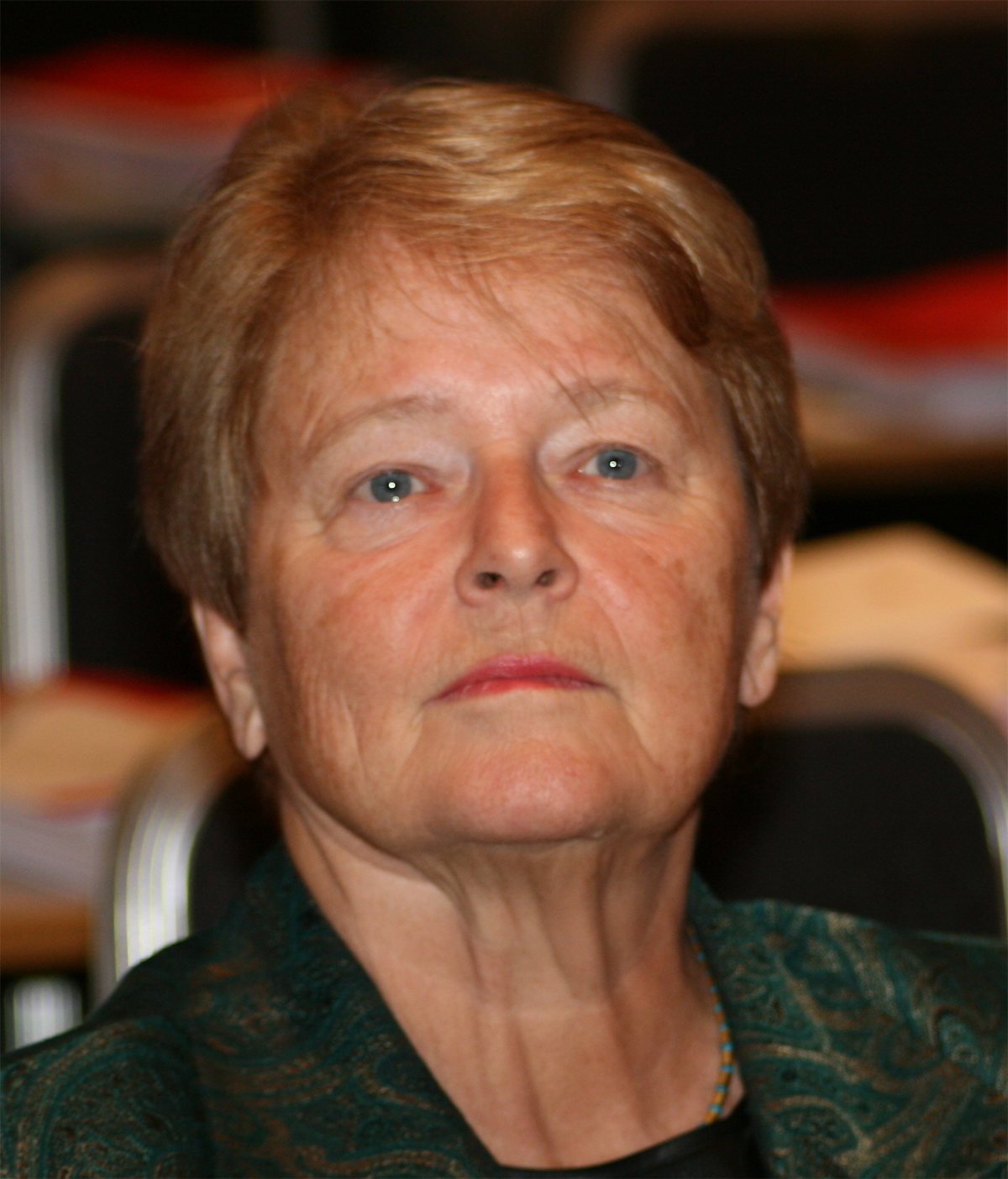
Brundtland in 2009

Brundtland has received many awards and honours, including

- Indira Gandhi Prize (1988)
- Charlemagne Prize (1994)
- Member of the American Philosophical Society (2002)
- Grand Cross of the Civil Order of Health (Spain, 2003)
- Thomas Jefferson Foundation Medal in Architecture (2008)
- Prize International Catalonia (2013) with Malala Yousafzai
- Tang Prize in Sustainable Development (2014)
- Honorary member of the Norwegian Association for Women's Rights (2016)
- Member of the Norwegian Academy of Science and Letters
- The National German Sustainability Award
- Honorary Member of the Moscow Society of Naturalists
- Rudyard n. Propst Award from Clubhouse International

== See also ==
- Odvar Nordli

Political offices
Preceded by Tor Halvorsen	Minister of the Environment; 1974–1979	Succeeded by Rolf Arthur Hansen
Preceded by Odvar Nordli	Prime Minister of Norway; 1981	Succeeded by Kåre Willoch
Preceded by Kåre Willoch	Prime Minister of Norway; 1986–1989	Succeeded by Jan Syse
Preceded by Jan Syse	Prime Minister of Norway; 1990–1996	Succeeded by Thorbjørn Jagland
Party political offices
Preceded by Reiulf Steen	Leader of the Labour Party; 1981–1992	Succeeded by Thorbjørn Jagland
Positions in intergovernmental organisations
Preceded by Hiroshi Nakajima	Director-General of the World Health Organization; 1998–2003	Succeeded by Lee Jong-wook
