= Ministry of Finance (Norway) =

Government ministry of Norway

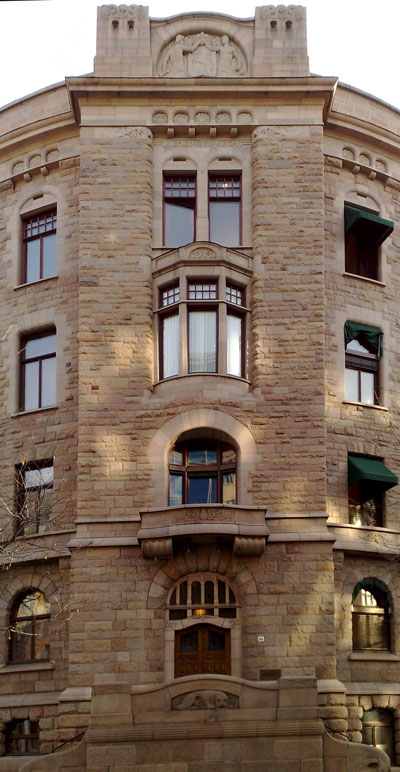
Main entrance to the ministry

The Royal Norwegian Ministry of Finance (Norwegian: Finansdepartementet) is a Norwegian ministry established in 1814. The ministry is responsible for state finance, including the state budget, taxation and economic policy in Norway. It is led by Jens Stoltenberg (Labour Party). The department must report to the Parliament of Norway.

== Organization ==
The ministry is divided into the following sections:

- Political staff
- Information Unit
- Asset Management Department
- Budget Department
- Financial Markets Department
- Tax Law Department
- Tax Policy Department
- Economic Policy Department
- Department of Administrative Affairs

=== Subsidiaries ===
The following government agencies are subordinate to the ministry:

- Pension Fund Global
- National Insurance Scheme Fund
- Bank of Norway
- Norwegian Customs and Excise Authorities
- Norwegian Financial Supervisory Authority
- Norwegian Government Agency for Financial Management
- Norwegian National Collection Agency
- Norwegian Tax Administration
- Statistics Norway

The ministry also owns 19.1% of the Nordic Investment Bank

== See also ==
- List of Norwegian Ministers of Finance
