= List of University of Oslo Faculty of Law alumni =

From 1811 to 1980, the faculty educated all lawyers of Norway, and still educates around 75% of new legal candidates. Its alumni hence includes the vast majority of the country's preeminent legal professionals, including academics, supreme court justices, senior civil servants, and a large number of politicians, among them 11 Prime Ministers and many cabinet ministers. This list of University of Oslo Faculty of Law alumni is limited to alumni who are notable outside the realm of Norwegian law.

== Politicians ==
=== Prime Ministers of Norway ===
- Christian Homann Schweigaard
- Francis Hagerup
- Emil Stang
- Johan Sverdrup
- Christian August Selmer
- Frederik Stang
- Wollert Konow (SB)
- Otto B. Halvorsen
- Otto Albert Blehr
- Jan P. Syse
- John Lyng

=== Foreign Ministers of Norway ===
- Jan Petersen
- Knut Frydenlund
- Andreas Cappelen
- Svenn Stray
- John Lyng
- Erling Wikborg
- Trygve Lie
- Johannes Irgens
- Thorvald Stoltenberg
- Arnold Ræstad
- Christian Fredrik Michelet

=== Finance Ministers of Norway ===
- Christian Michelsen
- Birger Kildal
- Søren Tobias Årstad
- Georg August Thilesen
- Fredrik Stang Lund
- Francis Hagerup
- Ole Andreas Furu
- Evald Rygh
- Olaj Olsen
- Herman Johan Foss Reimers
- Christian Homann Schweigaard
- Henrik Laurentius Helliesen
- Jens Holmboe
- August Christian Manthey
- Erik Røring Møinichen
- Christian Zetlitz Bretteville
- Rolf Presthus
- Andreas Zeier Cappelen
- Olav Meisdalshagen
- Erik Brofoss
- Gunnar Jahn
- Paul Ernst Wilhelm Hartmann
- Per Berg Lund
- Arnold Holmboe
- Otto Blehr
- Edvard Hagerup Bull

=== Other cabinet members ===
- Hanne Bjurstrøm, former minister of labour and social inclusion
- Johan Castberg, former minister of justice and minister of Social Affairs, Trade, Industry and Fisheries
- Grete Faremo, former minister justice, former minister of defence, minister of justice and minister of international development
- Jens Holmboe, former minister of justice, minister of church and education and minister of the navy and postal affairs
- Rolf Jacobsen, former minister of defence
- Knut Storberget, former minister of justice
- Hadia Tajik, leader Standing Committee on Justice in the Norwegian Parliament, former Minister of Culture

=== Members of the Norwegian Parliament ===
- Abid Raja, member of the Norwegian Parliament for the Liberal Party since 2013
- Anton Martin Schweigaard, prominent former member of the Norwegian Parliament
- Michael Tetzschner, member of the Norwegian Parliament for the Conservative Party since 2009
- Olemic Thommessen, President of the Parliament of Norway since 2013

=== Chairpersons of the Norwegian Nobel Committee ===
- Bernhard Getz
- Fredrik Stang
- Gunnar Jahn

=== Other politicians ===
- Stian Berger Røsland, Governing Mayor of Oslo (since 2009)
- Fabian Stang, Mayor of Oslo (since 2007)
- Fritz Huitfeldt, former Chairman of the City Government of Oslo (1997-2000)
- Hans Svelland, former Chairman of the City Government of Oslo (1986-1989)

== Rectors of the University of Oslo ==
- Johs Andenæs
- Lucy Smith
- Frede Castberg
- Fredrik Stang
- Bredo Henrik von Munthe af Morgenstierne

== International lawyers ==
- Rolv Ryssdal, former president of the European Court of Human Rights
- Frede Castberg, former president of the Hague Academy of International Law
- Mads Andenæs, former director of the British Institute of International and Comparative Law
- Erik Møse, former president of the International Criminal Tribunal for Rwanda and current (since 2011) judge at the European Court of Human Rights
- Torkel Opsahl, former member of the European Commission of Human Rights and of the United Nations Human Rights Committee
- Helge Klæstad, former president of the International Court of Justice

== Diplomats ==
- Trygve Lie, first Secretary-General of the United Nations
- Edvard Hambro, former President of the United Nations General Assembly
- Morten Wetland, former permanent Norwegian representative to the United Nations
- Wegger Christian Strømmen, former Norwegian ambassador to the United States
- Fritz Wedel Jarlsberg, notable diplomat

== Civil servants ==
=== Governors of Norges Bank ===
- Nicolai Rygg
- Erik Brofoss
- Gunnar Jahn

=== Directors of the Norwegian Data Inspectorate ===
- Bjørn Erik Thon
- Georg Apenes

=== Other civil servants ===
- Yngve Slyngstad, head of The Government Pension Fund – Global
- Nina Frisak, current (since 2001) regjeringsråd (the highest ranking civil servant position in the Norwegian government)

== Businesspeople ==
- John G. Bernander, former director-general of the Norwegian Broadcasting Corporation and the Confederation of Norwegian Enterprise
- Bjørn Kjos, founder of Norwegian Air Shuttle
- Carl Falck, former leader of Norges Grossistforbund. Norway's oldest man as of 2014.
- Anders Jahre, shipping magnate
- Helge Kringstad, former CEO of DnC (now DNB)
- Øyvind Eriksen, CEO of Aker Solutions

== World War II resistance fighters ==
- Jens Christian Hauge, also former minister of defence and minister of justice
- Gregers Gram, assassinated before he could finish his studies
- Gunnar Jahn, later minister of finance and governor of Norges Bank
- Vilhelm Aubert, member of XU, later professor at the Factualty
- Knut Løfsnes, leader of an XU department, later chairman of the Socialist People's Party
- Erik Gjems-Onstad, captain of the Norwegian Home Guard, later member of parliament
- Lorentz Brinch, leader of the Milorg chapter in Oslo
- Sven Arntzen, member of the Milorg military council, later Director of Public Prosecutions

== Explorers ==
- Helge Ingstad, discoverer of pre-Columbian Viking settlement in North America
- Erling Kagge, the first person to accomplish the "three pole challenge", and the first to walk to the South Pole alone
