= List of presidents of the Storting =

President of the Parliament of the Kingdom of Norway
- Stortingspresident
- Flag of Norway

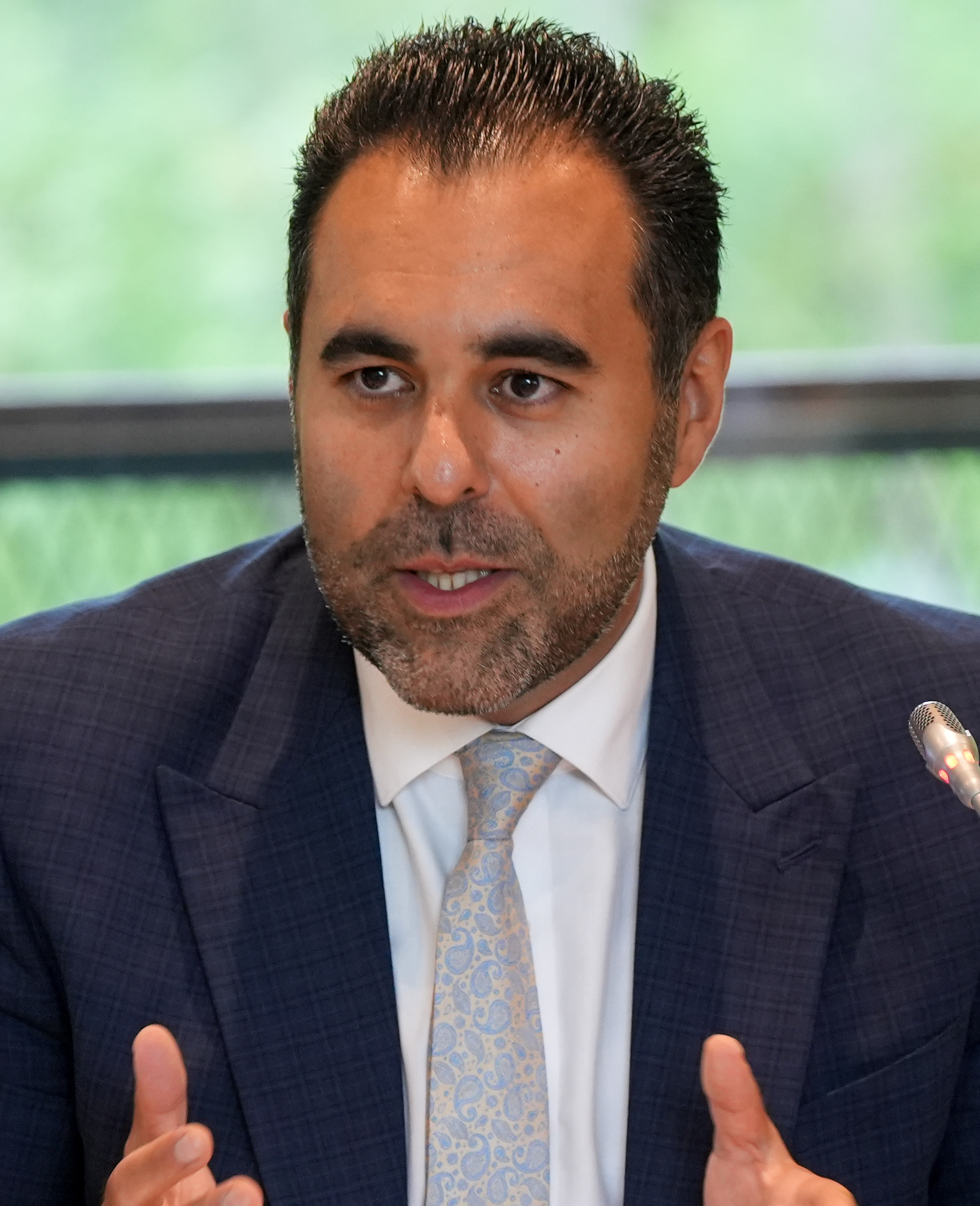
- Incumbent; Masud Gharahkhani since 25 November 2021
- Parliament of Norway
- Style: Honorable President; Ærede President (no)
- Seat: Oslo, Norway
- Nominator: Prime Minister of Norway
- Appointer: Elected by Parliament
- Term length: Four years; renewable
- Constituting instrument: Constitution of Norway
- Formation: 1814 (Riksforsamlinga)
- First holder: Peder Anker
- Website: http://www.stortinget.no

The president (speaker) of the Storting is the presiding officer of the Storting—the legislature of Norway. The position was created in 1814, when the country received its constitution.

== List of presidents of the Norwegian Parliament ==
Below is a list of the Storting's office-holders:

Period	Name(s)	Party
2021–	Masud Gharahkhani	Labour
2021	Eva Kristin Hansen	Labour
2018–2021	Tone W. Trøen	Conservative
2013–2018	Olemic Thommessen	Conservative
2009–2013	Dag Terje Andersen	Labour
2005–2009	Torbjørn Jagland	Labour
2001–2005	Jørgen Kosmo	Labour
1993–2001	Kirsti Kolle Grøndahl	Labour
1985–1993	Jo Benkow	Conservative
1981–1985	Per Hysing-Dahl	Conservative
1973–1981	Guttorm Hansen	Labour
1972–1973	Leif Granli	Labour
1965–1972	Bernt Ingvaldsen	Conservative
1961–1965	Nils Langhelle	Labour
1958–1961	Nils Langhelle, Oscar Torp	Labour
1953–1957	Oscar Torp, Einar Gerhardsen	Labour
1949–1953	Gustav Natvig-Pedersen	Labour
1945–1949	Gustav Natvig-Pedersen, Fredrik Monsen	Labour
1945	Carl Joachim Hambro	Conservative
1940–1945	vacant	see Occupation of Norway
1937–1940	Carl Joachim Hambro	Conservative
1934–1936	Carl Joachim Hambro, Johan Nygaardsvold	Conservative; Labour
1931–1933	Carl Joachim Hambro	Conservative
1928–1930	Carl Joachim Hambro	Conservative
1925–1927	Carl Joachim Hambro, Gunder A. J. Jahren, Ivar Lykke	Conservative
1922–1924	Ivar Lykke, Otto B. Halvorsen	Conservative
1919–1921	Gunnar Knudsen, Ivar Lykke, Anders Buen, Ivar Petterson Tveiten, Otto B. Halvorsen	Liberal; Conservative; Labour; Liberal; Conservative
1916–1918	Ivar Petterson Tveiten, Martin Olsen Nalum, Johan Ludwig Mowinckel	Liberal
1913–1915	Søren Tobias Årstad, Jørgen Løvland, Gunnar Knudsen	Liberal
1910–1912	Magnus Halvorsen, Wollert Konow (SB), Jens K. M. Bratlie	Liberal; Liberal; Conservative
1906–1909	Edvard A. Liljedahl, Gunnar Knudsen, Carl Berner	Liberal
1903–1906	Carl Berner, Johan H. P. Thorne, Francis Hagerup	Liberal; Conservative; Conservative
1900–1903	Edvard A. Liljedahl, Carl Berner	Liberal
1898–1900	Viggo Ullmann, Carl Berner, Johannes Steen	Liberal
1895–1897	Viggo Ullmann, Sivert A. Nielsen, Johannes Steen	Liberal
1892–1894	Viggo Ullmann, Sivert A. Nielsen	Liberal
1889–1891	Thomas Cathinco Bang, Sivert A. Nielsen, Olaus Olsen Eskeland, Emil Stang	n/a Liberal; Moderate Liberal; Conservative
1886–1888	Wollert Konow (SB), Sivert A. Nielsen, Johannes Steen	Liberal
1883–1885	Johannes Steen, Johan Sverdrup	n/a
1882	Johannes Steen	n/a
1880–1882	Johannes Steen, Johan Sverdrup; Bernhard L. Essendrop	n/a
1877–1879	Bernhard L. Essendrop, Johan Sverdrup	n/a
1874–1876	Bernhard L. Essendrop, Johan Sverdrup	n/a
1871–1873	P. Daniel B. W. Kildal, Johan Sverdrup	n/a
1868–1869	Hans Jørgen C. Aall, Georg Prahl Harbitz	n/a
1865–1866	Nils Vogt, Georg Prahl Harbitz	n/a
1864	Georg Prahl Harbitz	n/a
1862–1863	Hans Jørgen C. Aall, Georg Prahl Harbitz	n/a
1859–1860	Hans Jørgen C. Aall, Georg Prahl Harbitz	n/a
1858	Ulrik Motzfeldt, Georg Prahl Harbitz	n/a
1857	Ulrik Motzfeldt, Georg Prahl Harbitz	n/a
1854	Hans Jørgen C. Aall, Georg Prahl Harbitz	n/a
1851	Hans Jørgen C. Aall, Georg Prahl Harbitz	n/a
1848	Halvor Olaus Christensen, Georg Prahl Harbitz, Hans Riddervold, Carl Valentin Falsen	n/a
1845	Niels Arntzen Sem, Søren A. W. Sørenssen, Carl Valentin Falsen	n/a
1842	Hans Riddervold, Søren A. W. Sørenssen	n/a
1839	Hans Riddervold, Søren A. W. Sørenssen	n/a
1836–1837	Johan Henrik Rye, Søren A. W. Sørenssen	n/a
1836	Hans Riddervold, Søren A. W. Sørenssen,	n/a
1833	Søren A. W. Sørenssen, Carl Valentin Falsen, Hans Riddervold	n/a
1830	Hans Riddervold, Søren A. W. Sørenssen, Niels Arntzen Sem, J. C. Herman Wedel Jarlsberg, Carl Valentin Falsen	n/a
1828	Herman Wedel Jarlsberg	n/a
1827	Niels Stockfleth Schultz, Lauritz Weidemann, J. C. Herman Wedel Jarlsberg, Christian Krohg	n/a
1824	Herman Wedel Jarlsberg, Christian Krohg, Georg Sverdrup, Valentin C. W. Sibbern	n/a
1822	Carl Valentin Falsen, Valentin C. W. Sibbern	n/a
1821	Ingelbrecht Knudssøn, Carsten Tank, Christian Magnus Falsen, Andreas Arntzen, Valentin C. W. Sibbern	n/a
1818	Valentin C. W. Sibbern, Wilhelm F. K. Christie, Georg Sverdrup	n/a
1815–1816	Wilhelm F. K. Christie	n/a
1814	Wilhelm F. K. Christie, Christian A. Diriks	n/a
Eidsvold (1814)	Georg Sverdrup, Christian Magnus Falsen, Christian A. Diriks, Jens S. Fabricius, Diderik Hegermann, Peder Anker	n/a

== Sources ==
- Rulers.org
