= Harald Smedal =

Norwegian politician

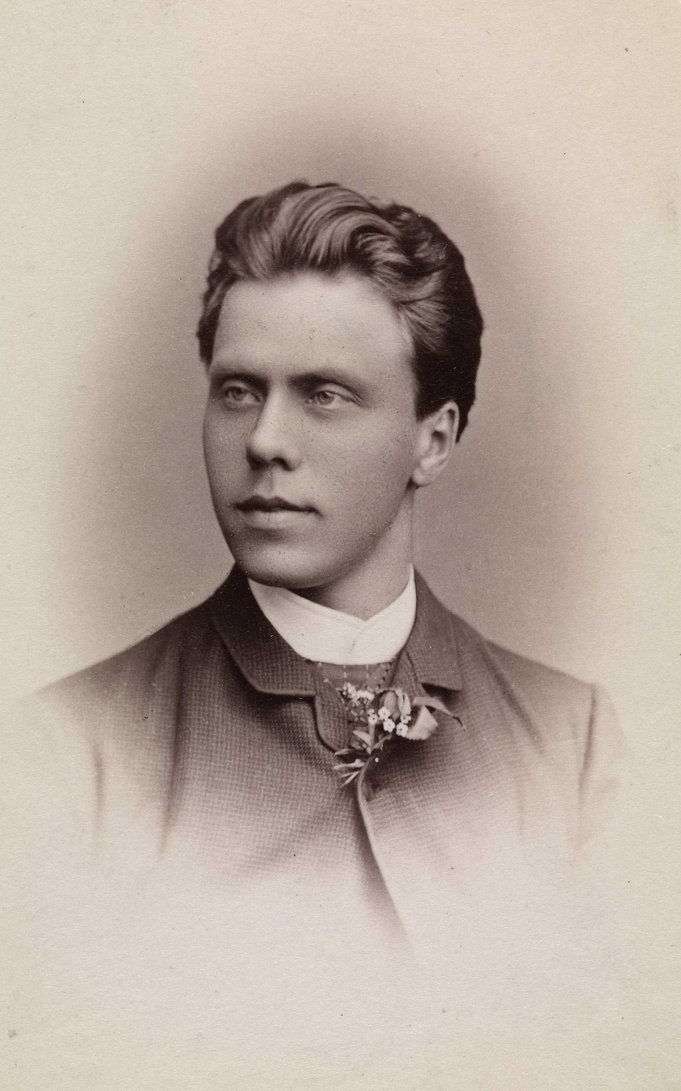

Director of Public Prosecutions
- In office 1904 – 3 May 1911; Acting: 1904–1906
- Preceded by: Johan Blackstad
- Succeeded by: Peder Kjerschow

Minister of Justice
- In office 15 August 1897 – 17 February 1898
- Prime Minister: Francis Hagerup
- Preceded by: Francis Hagerup
- Succeeded by: Ole Anton Qvam

Minister of Auditing
- In office 26 November 1896 – 15 August 1897
- Prime Minister: Francis Hagerup
- Preceded by: Fredrik Stang Lund
- Succeeded by: Francis Hagerup

Member of the Council of State Division
- In office 14 October 1895 – 26 November 1896 Serving with Baard Madsen Haugland and Olai Johan Olsen
- Prime Minister: Francis Hagerup
- Preceded by: Anton C. Bang; Ole Furu
- Succeeded by: Fredrik Stang Lund

Personal details
- Born: 5 April 1859 Kristiansand, Vest-Agder, Sweden-Norway
- Died: 3 May 1911 (aged 52) Kristiania, Norway
- Spouse: Caroline Kirkgaard Hofgaard (m. 1886)
- Children: Gustav Smedal
- Occupation: Jurist; Politician

Harald Smedal (5 April 1859 – 3 May 1911) was a Norwegian politician of the Liberal Party. He served as a member of the Council of State Division in Stockholm from 1895 to 1896, Minister of Auditing from 1896 to 1897, and Minister of Justice from 1897 to 1898.

Legal offices
Preceded by Johan Blackstad	Norwegian Director of Public Prosecutions (acting 1904–1906); 1904–1911	Succeeded by Peder Kjerschow
