= Johannes Winding Harbitz =

Norwegian politician (1831–1917)

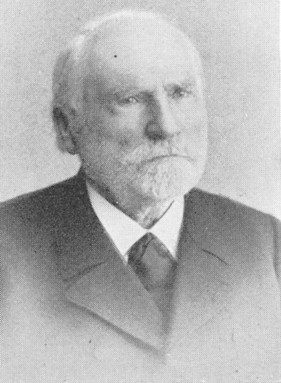

Minister of Auditing
- In office 27 April 1895 – 14 October 1895
- Prime Minister: Emil Stang
- Preceded by: Ole A. Furu
- Succeeded by: Fredrik Stang Lund

Minister of Defence
- In office 15 July 1894 – 27 April 1895
- Prime Minister: Emil Stang
- Preceded by: Wilhelm Olssøn
- Succeeded by: Wilhelm Olssøn

Member of the Council of State Division
- In office 2 May 1893 – 15 July 1894 Serving with Ernst Motzfeldt
- Prime Minister: Emil Stang
- Preceded by: Vilhelm Wexelsen; Thomas von Westen Engelhart
- Succeeded by: Wilhelm Olssøn; Francis Hagerup

Personal details
- Born: 26 December 1831 Askvoll, Nordre Bergenhus, Sweden-Norway
- Died: 5 September 1917 (aged 85) Vestre Aker, Norway
- Party: Conservative
- Spouse: Louise Henriette Betty Lunnevig

Johannes Winding Harbitz (26 December 1831 – 5 September 1917) was a Norwegian politician for the Conservative Party.

He was born in Askvold as the oldest son of vicar and politician Georg Prahl Harbitz and his wife Maren Mariken Hof. He enrolled as a student in 1850, but soon took off to work at sea. He took the mate's examination in 1852, and worked as a shipmaster from 1859 to 1869, as well as ship-owner. He was also vice consul from the mid-1880s, at that time living in Tønsberg.

He was elected to the Norwegian Parliament in 1880, representing the urban constituency Tønsberg. He was re-elected on four occasions, serving a total of five terms. He was also mayor of Tønsberg for twelve years. On 2 May 1893 he was appointed to the second cabinet Stang as a member of the Council of State Division in Stockholm. He left on 1 July 1894 to become Minister of Defence. On 1 April the next year there was a reshuffle and he was appointed Minister of Auditing. He held this post until October 1895, when the second cabinet Stang fell.

He moved from Tønsberg to Vestre Aker in 1897, and died in 1917. He was married to Louise Henriette Betty Lunnevig, daughter of Ole Lunnevig in Tønsberg.

Government offices
Preceded by Christian Olssøn	Norwegian Minister of Defence; 1894–April 1895	Succeeded by Christian Olssøn
Preceded by Ole Andreas Furu	Norwegian Minister of Auditing; April 1895–October 1895	Succeeded by Fredrik Stang Lund
