= Ernst Motzfeldt =

Norwegian government minister

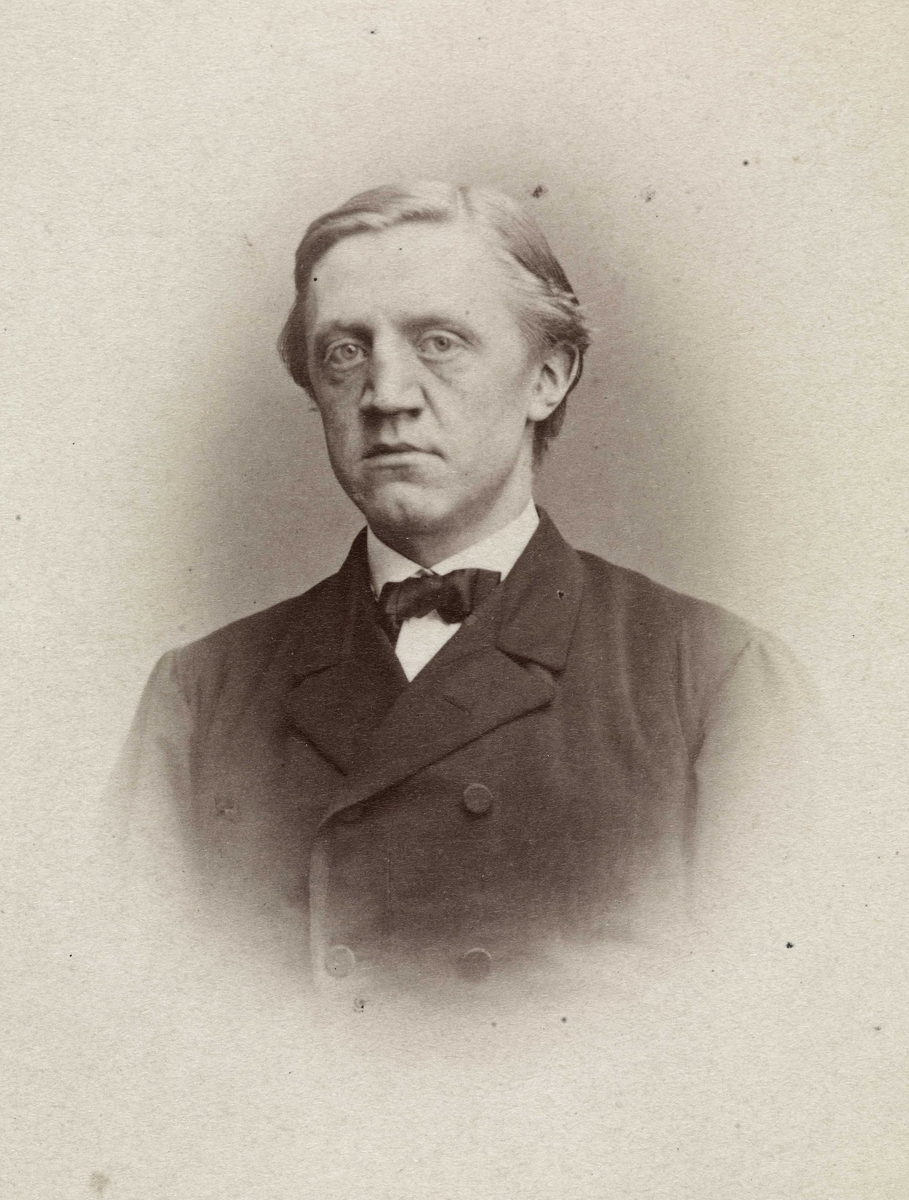

Minister of Justice
- In office 15 July 1894 – 14 October 1895
- Prime Minister: Emil Stang
- Preceded by: Francis Hagerup
- Succeeded by: Francis Hagerup

Member of the Council of State Division
- In office 2 May 1893 – 15 July 1894 Serving with Johannes W. Harbitz
- Prime Minister: Emil Stang
- Preceded by: Vilhelm Wexelsen; Thomas von Westen Engelhart
- Succeeded by: Wilhelm Olssøn; Francis Hagerup

Personal details
- Born: 1 March 1842 Christiania, Sweden-Norway
- Died: 10 June 1915 (aged 73) Christiania, Norway
- Party: Conservative
- Children: Ingeborg Motzfeldt Løchen; Ulrik Anton Motzfeldt

Ernst Motzfeldt (1 March 1842 – 10 June 1915) was a Norwegian member of the Council of State Division in Stockholm (Norske statsråder i Stockholm) 1893-1894 and Minister of Justice from 1894 to 1895 within the Second Cabinet of Prime Minister Emil Stang.

Motzfeldt was born in Christiania to Ulrik Anton Motzfeldt and Anna Pauline Birch. He graduated as cand.jur. in 1864, and was named as a Supreme Court Justice from 1890 to 1912. He chaired the Norwegian Red Cross from 1905 to 1908. He was decorated as Knight, First Class of the Order of St. Olav in 1891, and Commander in 1893, and was a Commander of the Order of the Polar Star.
