= Stang's Second Cabinet =

Government of Norway from 1893 to 1895

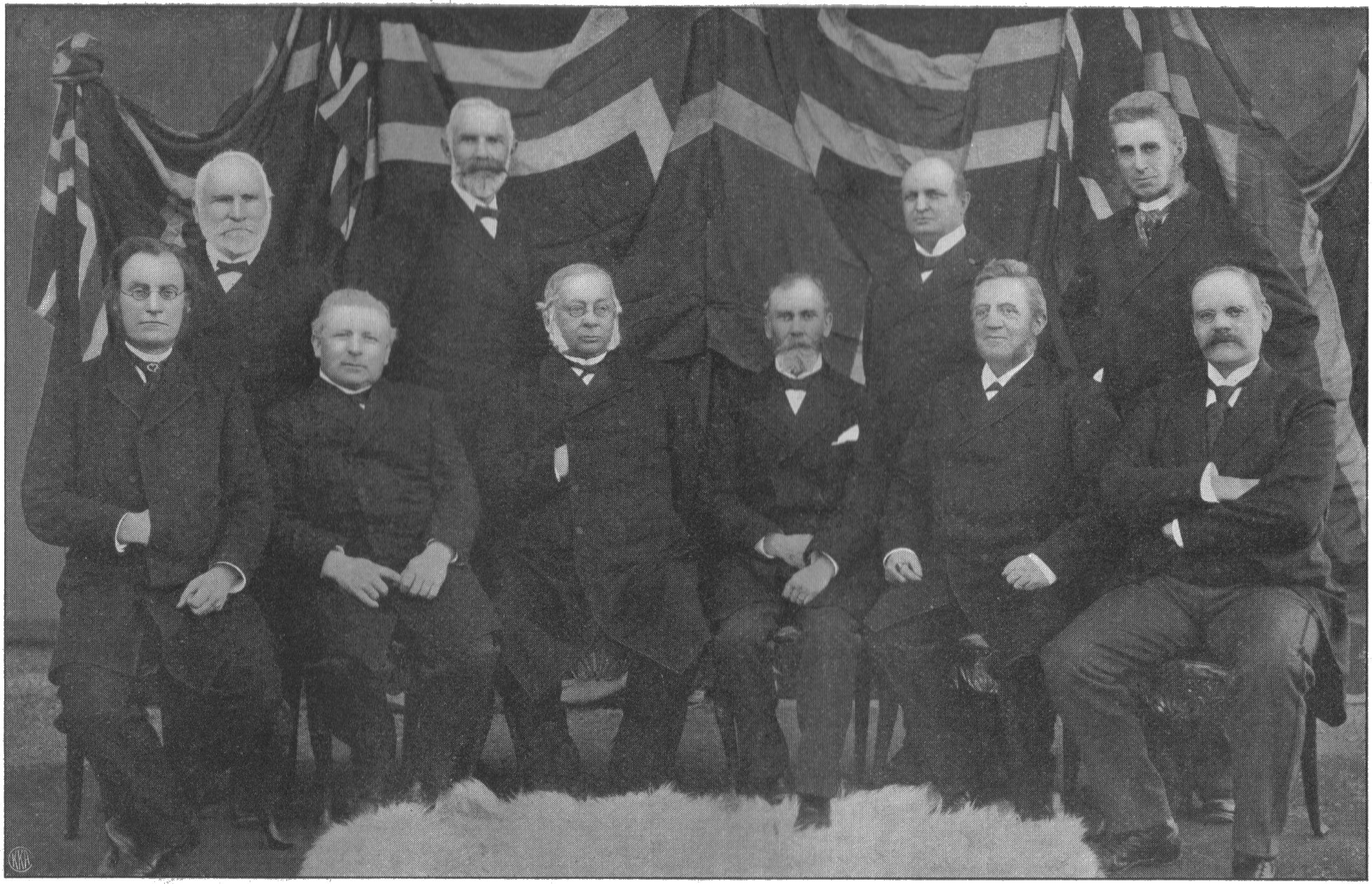
The second cabinet of Emil Stang. Standing from right; Johannes Winding Harbitz, Peder Nilsen, Christian Olssøn, Peter Birch-Reichenwald. Sitting from right; Anton Christian Bang, Ole Andreas Furu, Emil Stang, Gregers Winther Wulfsberg Gram, Ernst Motzfeldt, Francis Hagerup.

The Stang's Second Cabinet governed Norway between 2 May 1893 and 14 October 1895. It had the following composition:

== Cabinet members ==
Portfolio	Minister	Period	Party
Prime Minister	Emil Stang		Conservative
Prime Minister in Stockholm	Gregers Winther Wulfsberg Gram		Conservative
Member of the Council of State Division in Stockholm	Ernst Motzfeldt	– July 1894	Conservative
Member of the Council of State Division in Stockholm	Johannes Winding Harbitz	– July 1894	Conservative
Member of the Council of State Division in Stockholm	Christian W. E. B. Olssøn	July 1894 –	Conservative
Member of the Council of State Division in Stockholm	Francis Hagerup	July 1894 – 9 August 1895	Conservative
Member of the Council of State Division in Stockholm	Anton Christian Bang	27 April 1895 –	Conservative
Member of the Council of State Division in Stockholm	Ole Andreas Furu	9 August 1895 –	Conservative
Minister of Defence	Christian W. E. B. Olssøn	– July 1894	Conservative
Minister of Defence	Johannes Winding Harbitz	July 1894 – 27 April 1895	Conservative
Minister of Defence	Christian W. E. B. Olssøn	27 April 1895 –	Conservative
Minister of Finance and Customs	Ole Andreas Furu	– 9 August 1895	Conservative
Minister of Finance and Customs	Francis Hagerup	9 August 1895 –	Conservative
Minister of Auditing	Emil Stang	– 7 September 1894	Conservative
Minister of Auditing	Ole Andreas Furu	7 September 1894 – 27 April 1895	Conservative
Minister of Auditing	Johannes Winding Harbitz	27 April 1895 –	Conservative
Minister of the Interior	Johan Henrik Paasche Thorne	– 3 March 1894	Conservative
Minister of the Interior	Peter Birch-Reichenwald	3 March 1894 –	Conservative
Minister of Labour	Peder Nilsen		Conservative
Minister of Justice and the Police	Francis Hagerup	– July 1894	Conservative
Minister of Justice and the Police	Ernst Motzfeldt	July 1894 –	Conservative
Minister of Church and Education	Anton Christian Bang	– 27 April 1895	Conservative
Minister of Church and Education	Emil Stang	27 April 1895 –	Conservative

== State Secretary ==
Not to be confused with the modern title State Secretary. The old title State Secretary, used between 1814 and 1925, is now known as Secretary to the Government (Regjeringsråd).

- Halfdan Lehmann
