= Peder Nilsen =

Norwegian politician

Peder Nilsen (22 February 1846 – 25 July 1921) was a Norwegian politician for the Conservative Party.

Nilsen was born in Tønsberg in Vestfold, Norway. He was trained as an engineer. Nilsen graduated from the Norwegian Military College in 1871. He was an assistant engineer at Rørosbanen and other railway construction from 1872 to 1878, district engineer and operations manager at Hamar-Tønsetbanen from 1878–1893. From 1897 to 1911 he was the manager at Hovedbanen.

He was elected to the Norwegian Parliament in 1889, representing the constituency of Lillehammer, Hamar og Gjøvik. He sat through only one term. On 2 May 1893 he was appointed to the Second Cabinet of Prime Minister Emil Stang as Minister of Labour. The second cabinet of Stang was replaced by the First Cabinet of Prime Minister Francis Hagerup on 14 October 1895. Nilsen retained his post, but left on 1 August 1897 as he was appointed a member of the Council of State Division in Stockholm. He left after two months.

Political offices
Preceded by Hans Hein Theodor Nysom	Norwegian Minister of Labour; 1893–1897	Succeeded by Fredrik Stang Lund
