= Stang's First Cabinet =

Government of Norway from 1889 to 1891

- Cabinet of Norway

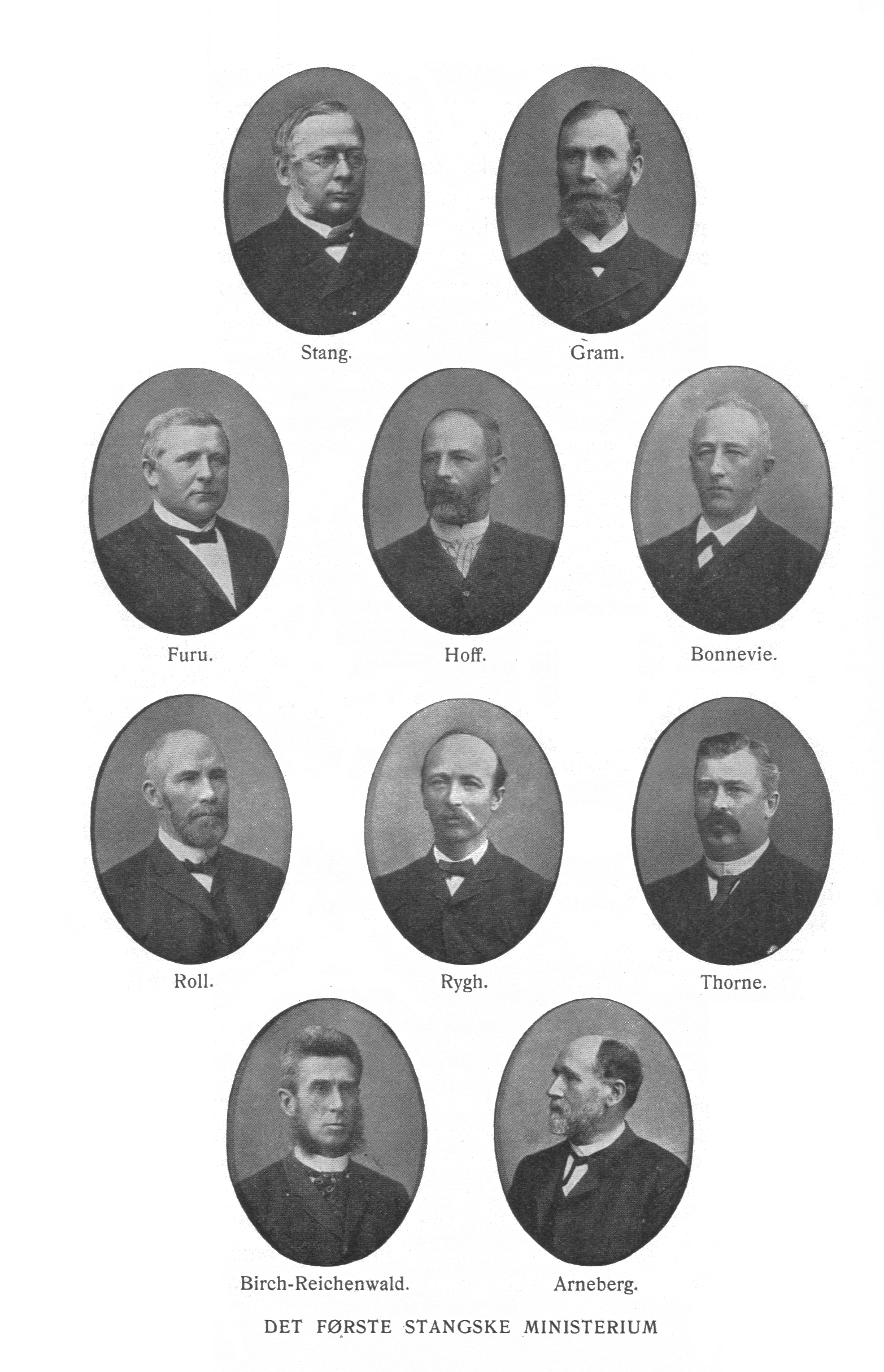
- Portraits of the cabinet members.
- Date formed: 13 July 1889
- Date dissolved: 6 March 1891

People and organisations
- Head of state: Oscar II of Sweden
- Head of government: Emil Stang
- No. of ministers: 10
- Member party: Conservative Party
- Status in legislature: Minority government

History
- Election: 1888 parliamentary election
- Legislature term: 1889–1891
- Predecessor: Sverdrup's Cabinet
- Successor: Steen's First Cabinet

The Stang's First Cabinet governed Norway between 13 July 1889 and 6 March 1891. It was led by Emil Stang and is one of two Conservative Party-only cabinets ever in Norway, the other being Willoch's First Cabinet from 1981 to 1983. It had the following composition:

== Cabinet members ==
Cabinet
Portfolio	Minister	Took office	Left office	Party
Prime Minister; Minister of Auditing	Emil Stang	13 July 1989	6 March 1891	Conservative
Prime Minister in Stockholm	Gregers Gram	13 July 1889	6 March 1891	Conservative
Minister of Justice and the Police	Ferdinand Roll	13 July 1889	15 July 1890	Conservative
Minister of Justice and the Police	Ulrik Arneberg	15 July 1890	6 March 1891	Conservative
Minister of Finance and Customs	Evald Rygh	13 July 1889	6 March 1891	Conservative
Minister of Defence	Edvard Hans Hoff	13 July 1889	6 March 1891	Conservative
Minister of Education and Church Affairs	Jacob Aall Bonnevie	13 July 1889	6 March 1891	Conservative
Minister of the Interior	Johan H. P. Thorne	13 July 1889	7 July 1890	Conservative
Minister of the Interior	Ole Andreas Furu	7 July 1890	6 March 1891	Conservative
Minister of Labour	Peter Birch-Reichenwald	13 July 1889	6 March 1891	Conservative
Members of the Council of State Division in Stockholm	Ulrik Arneberg	13 July 1889	7 July 1890	Conservative
Members of the Council of State Division in Stockholm	Ole Andreas Furu	13 July 1889	7 July 1890	Conservative
Members of the Council of State Division in Stockholm	Johan H. P. Thorne	7 July 1890	6 March 1891	Conservative
Members of the Council of State Division in Stockholm	Ferdinand Roll	15 July 1890	6 March 1891	Conservative

== State Secretary ==
Not to be confused with the modern title State Secretary. The old title State Secretary, used between 1814 and 1925, is now known as Secretary to the Government (Regjeringsråd).

- Halfdan Lehmann
