= Momme =

Momme may refer to:

- Momme Andresen (1857–1951), German industrial research chemist
- Momme Peterson (1771–1835), Danish-Norwegian businessperson and politician
- Momme (unit), a Japanese historic unit of weight, or units based on it:
  - A unit of pearl weight: Pearl#Momme weight
  - A unit of textile (silk) measurement, see Units of textile measurement#Momme
  - Unit of several Japanese historic currencies originating from the value of silver weighed in momme
    - A proposed denomination of Japanese coinage from the Meiji period

== See also ==
- San Mommè, an Italian village and hamlet (frazione) of the municipality of Pistoia, in the province of Pistoia, Tuscany
