= Wollert Konow (Hedemarken politician) =

Norwegian politician and farmer

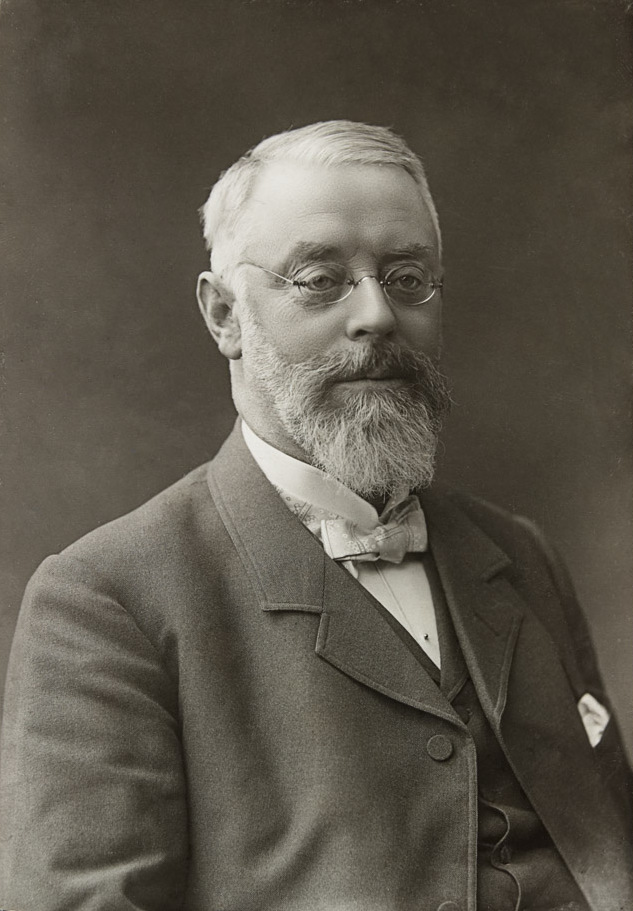

Minister of Agriculture
- In office 6 November 1900 – 9 June 1903
- Prime Minister: Johannes Steen; Otto Blehr
- Preceded by: Ole Anton Qvam
- Succeeded by: Gunnar Knudsen

Minister of the Interior
- In office 6 March 1891 – 2 May 1893
- Prime Minister: Johannes Steen
- Preceded by: Ole Furu
- Succeeded by: Johan Thorne

Minister of Auditing
- In office 6 November 1900 – 9 June 1903
- Prime Minister: Johannes Steen; Otto Blehr
- Preceded by: Ole Anton Qvam
- Succeeded by: Otto Blehr

Personal details
- Born: 24 May 1847 Bergen, Hordaland, United Kingdoms of Sweden and Norway (now Norway)
- Died: 25 October 1932 (aged 85) Oslo, Norway
- Party: Liberal; Free-minded Liberal; Agrarian
- Spouse: Ida Teresia Bojsen (m. 1879)

Wollert Konow (born 24 May 1847 in Bergen, died 25 October 1932) was a Norwegian politician and farmer.

Konow was head of the Interior Ministry from 1891 to 1893, speaking as Foreign Minister in 1913 and central radicals for decades. In 1891 he was the originator of the Skarnes line. Konow was very skeptical of diplomacy. In 1906 he would prefer to have a unitary service in which diplomacy, consulate and ministry were coordinated. The rest of the Liberal Party opposed this radical claim and pointed to Sweden whom still kept the ministry, consulate and diplomacy separate. However, the Swedes eventually began to add it the same year, and after the great reform in 1922, Norway also introduced unitary service.

In political context, he is often referred to as Wollert Konow (H) or Wollert Konow (KH). The "K" stands for Konow and "H" for Hedemark because he represented the county of Hedemark in the Storting. The letters are to distinguish him from his cousin, fellow politician Wollert Konow (SB), who served as Prime Minister from 1910 to 1912. His initials SB, stand for Søndre Bergenhus. The Prussian Consul from 1806 by August Konow (1780-1873), who in 1824 wanted the Storting to push for more Norwegians to be appointed diplomats and consultants, was the brother of their common grandfather.

- 1882 farmer at Tjern in Ringsaker Municipality.
- Deputy Representative of the Liberal Party from 1886 to 1891, from 1895 to 1912 and from 1916 to 1918.
- Deputy Representative of the Labour Democrats from 1913 to 1915.
- Deputy Representative of the Farmers' Union (later the Agrarian Party) from 1919 to 1921.
- Deputy Representative for the Free-minded Liberal Party from 1922 to 1924.
- Chief of the Interior Ministry in Johannes Steens first cabinet from 1891 to 1893
- Minister of Agriculture and Auditing in Johannes Steen's second cabinet and Otto Blehr's first cabinet from 1900 to 1903.

Konow was also awarded the 7 June medal. He died in October 1932, and was buried at Vår Frelsers gravlund.
