= Carl Berner (politician) =

Norwegian politician (1841–1918)

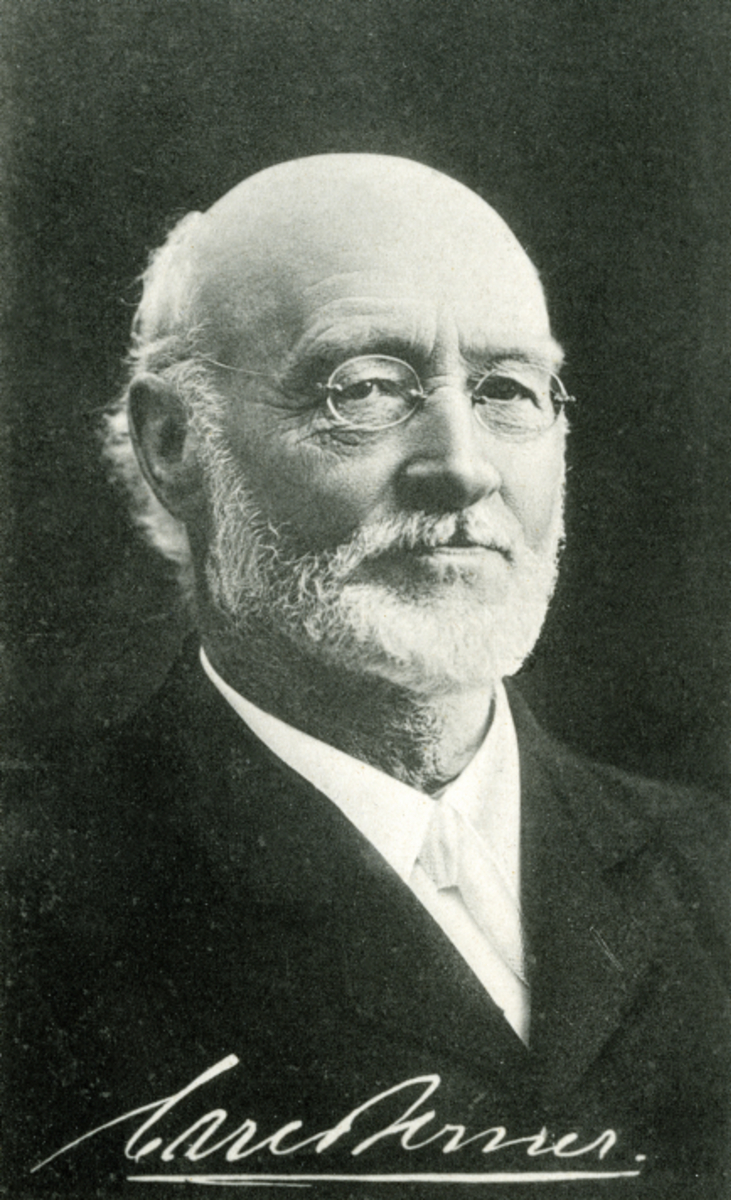

President of the Storting
- In office 1 January 1898 – 31 December 1909 Serving with Viggo Ullmann, Johannes Steen, Edvard Liljedahl, Francis Hagerup, Johan Thorne and Gunnar Knudsen
- Monarchs: Oscar II; Haakon VII
- Prime Minister: Francis Hagerup; Johannes Steen; Otto Blehr; Christian Michelsen; Jørgen Løvland; Gunnar Knudsen
- Preceded by: Viggo Ullmann; Johannes Steen; Sivert A. Nielsen
- Succeeded by: Magnus Halvorsen; Jens Bratlie; Wollert Konow

Leader of the Liberal Party
- In office 1903–1909
- Preceded by: Lars Holst
- Succeeded by: Gunnar Knudsen

Minister of Education and Church Affairs
- In office 15 July 1892 – 2 May 1893
- Prime Minister: Johannes Steen
- Preceded by: Vilhelm Wexelsen
- Succeeded by: Anton C. Bang

Member of the Council of State Division
- In office 6 March 1891 – 15 July 1892 Serving with Jacob Otto Lange
- Prime Minister: Johannes Steen
- Preceded by: Ferdinand Roll; Johan Thorne
- Succeeded by: Vilhelm Wexelsen; Thomas von Westen Engelhart

Member of the Norwegian Parliament
- In office 1 January 1904 – 31 December 1909
- Constituency: Sarpsborg
- In office 1 January 1886 – 31 December 1903
- Constituency: Bergen

Personal details
- Born: Carl Christian Berner; 20 November 1841 Christiania, Sweden-Norway
- Died: 25 May 1918 (aged 76) Christiania, Norway
- Party: Liberal
- Spouse: Olivia Mathilde Jacobine Berner (m. 1868)
- Children: 2

Carl Christian Berner (20 November 1841 – 25 May 1918) was a Norwegian politician for the Liberal Party. He was member of the Council of State Division in Stockholm 1891–92, and Norwegian Minister of Education and Church Affairs 1892–93.

== Background ==
Berner was born in Oslo, Norway. He was the son of Oluf Steen Julius Berner (1809–55) and Marie Louise Falkenberg (1816–41). He studied science and mathematics before he started working as a teacher at several different schools in Oslo. Berner studied at the Royal Frederick University (now University of Oslo) where he earned his cand.philol. in 1861. In 1874 he was appointed director of the newly established polytechnical school of Bergen, a position he held until 1891.

== Political career ==
In Bergen he started his political career and in 1883 he was elected to the county council. In 1885 he was elected as a member of the Norwegian Parliament. He had a brilliant career in the Parliament, and in his second period he was appointed President of the lower house (Odelsting). As the President of the Odelsting, he was central in the conflict leading to Prime Minister Emil Stangs stepping down from office. In 1891 he stepped up as Minister of Education and Church Affairs under the government of Johannes Steen. Between 1895 and 1903, Berner represented Bergen as a member of Parliament, and between 1903 and 1909 he represented Sarpsborg. He was appointed President of the Norwegian parliament in 1898—a position he held until 1908. He played an important role in the dissolution of the union between Norway and Sweden in 1905. In 1909, Berner did not get elected to Parliament from the district of Nedre Romerike. He gradually stepped down from his political offices, though he did hold several administrative and representative offices. In 1884 he was a co-founder of the Norwegian Association for Women's Rights.

== Personal life ==
He was married in 1868 to Olivia Mathilde Jacobine Berner (1841–1919). They were the parents of the architects Jørgen Haslef Berner (1873–1955) and Carl Berner (1877–1943).
