= Kollerud =

Kollerud is a Norwegian surname. Notable people with the surname include:

- Christian Christensen Kollerud (1767–1833), Norwegian farmer and politician
- Else Kollerud Furre (1922–2019), Norwegian politician
