= Søren Wilhelm Thorne =

Norwegian politician

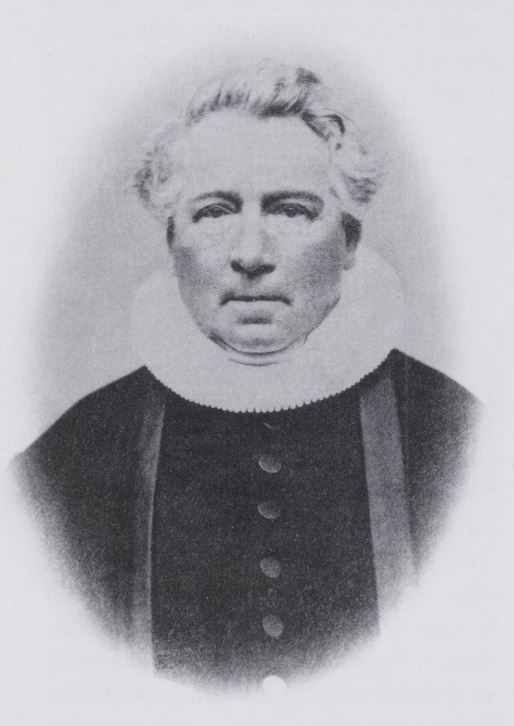
- Søren Wilhelm Thorne

Personal details
- Born: 29 May 1804 Drammen in Buskerud, Norway
- Died: 17 April 1878 (aged 73)
- Denomination: Christian
- Parents: Amund Linnæs Thorne and Friederiche Schwencke
- Occupation: Priest
- Education: University of Christiania

Søren Wilhelm Thorne (29 May 1804 – 17 April 1878) was a Norwegian priest and politician.

He was born at Drammen in Buskerud, Norway. His father, Amund Thorne, was a merchant. He finished schooling at Drammen Latin School in 1823. He graduated as cand.theol. from the University of Christiania in 1829. He worked as a school teacher in Drammen, parish priest in Rogaland and vicar in Leganger from 1840. He was appointed vicar in Kongsberg in 1848, and also became elected to the city council.

He was elected to the Norwegian Parliament in 1854, 1857 and 1859, representing the constituency of Kongsberg.

== Personal life ==
He was the brother of timber merchant Johan Frederik Thorne and an uncle of his son, Johan Thorne. He died in 1878 and was buried in the Kongsberg Church cemetery (Kongsberg gamle kirkegård).
