= Elias Sunde =

Norwegian politician

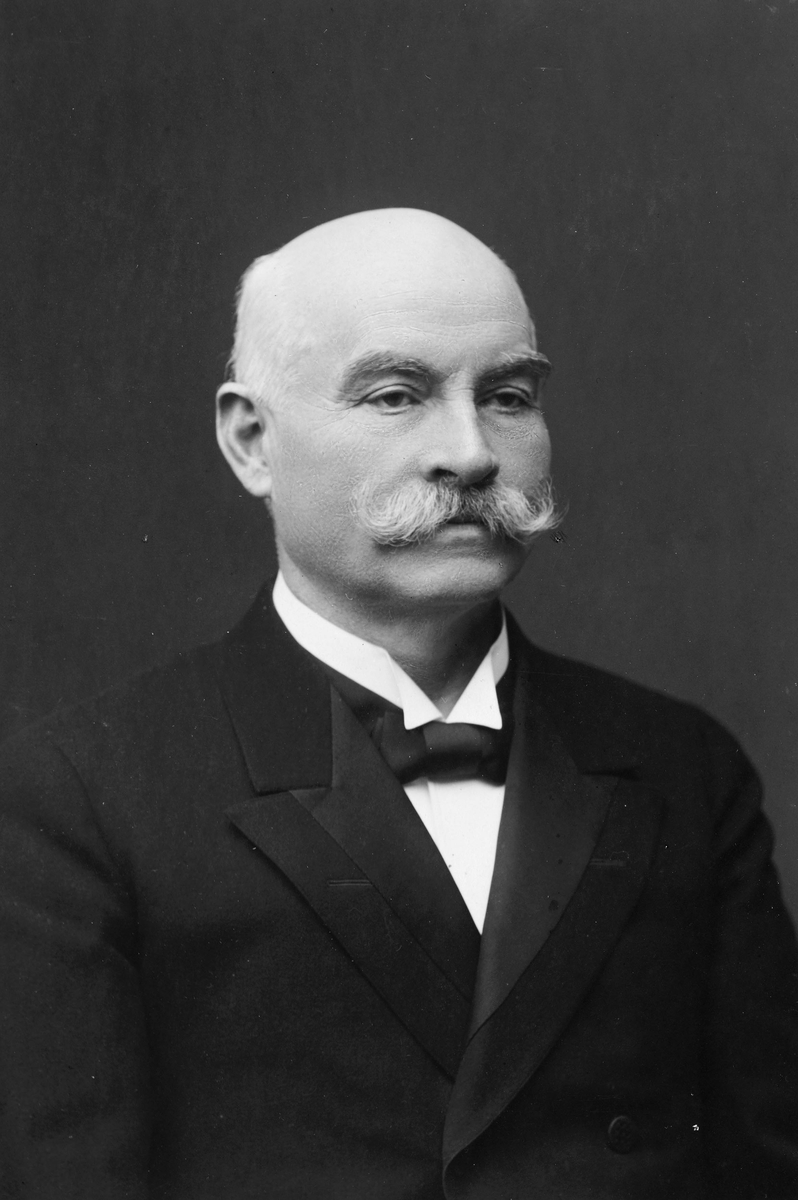

Minister of Finance
- In office 8 June 1901 – 9 June 1903
- Prime Minister: Johannes Steen; Otto Blehr
- Preceded by: Søren T. Årstad
- Succeeded by: Gunnar Knudsen
- In office 17 February 1898 – 19 May 1900
- Prime Minister: Johannes Steen
- Preceded by: Birger Kildal
- Succeeded by: Georg A. Thilesen

Member of the Council of State Division
- In office 9 June 1903 – 22 October 1903 Serving with Sigurd Ibsen
- Prime Minister: Otto Blehr
- Preceded by: Gunnar Knudsen
- Succeeded by: Christian Michelsen; Paul B. Vogt
- In office 19 May 1900 – 8 June 1901 Serving with Jørgen Løvland and Christian Sparre
- Prime Minister: Johannes Steen
- Preceded by: Thomas von Westen Engelhart
- Succeeded by: Søren T. Årstad; Gunnar Knudsen

Mayor of Oslo
- In office 15 October 1895 – 31 December 1897
- Preceded by: Fredrik Stang Lund
- Succeeded by: Vollert H. Bøgh

Member of the Norwegian Parliament
- In office 1 January 1895 – 31 December 1900
- Constituency: Kristiania, Hønefoss and Kongsvinger

Personal details
- Born: 2 October 1851 Flekkefjord, Lister og Mandal, Sweden-Norway
- Died: 2 July 1910 (aged 58) Bad Nauheim, Hessen, Germany
- Party: Liberal
- Spouse: Benedicte Louise Tjersland
- Children: Arne Sunde

Elias Sunde (2 October 1851 in Flekkefjord – 2 July 1910) was a Norwegian politician from the Liberal Party who served as Minister of Finance 1898–1900 and 1900–1903, and member of the Council of State Division in Stockholm from 1900 to 1901. He was also the mayor of Oslo from 1895 to 1897. He was the father of justice minister Arne Sunde.

Political offices
Preceded by Fredrik Stang Lund	Mayor of Oslo; 1895–1897	Succeeded by Vollert Hille Bøgh
