= Hans Hein Theodor Nysom =

Norwegian politician (1845–1903)

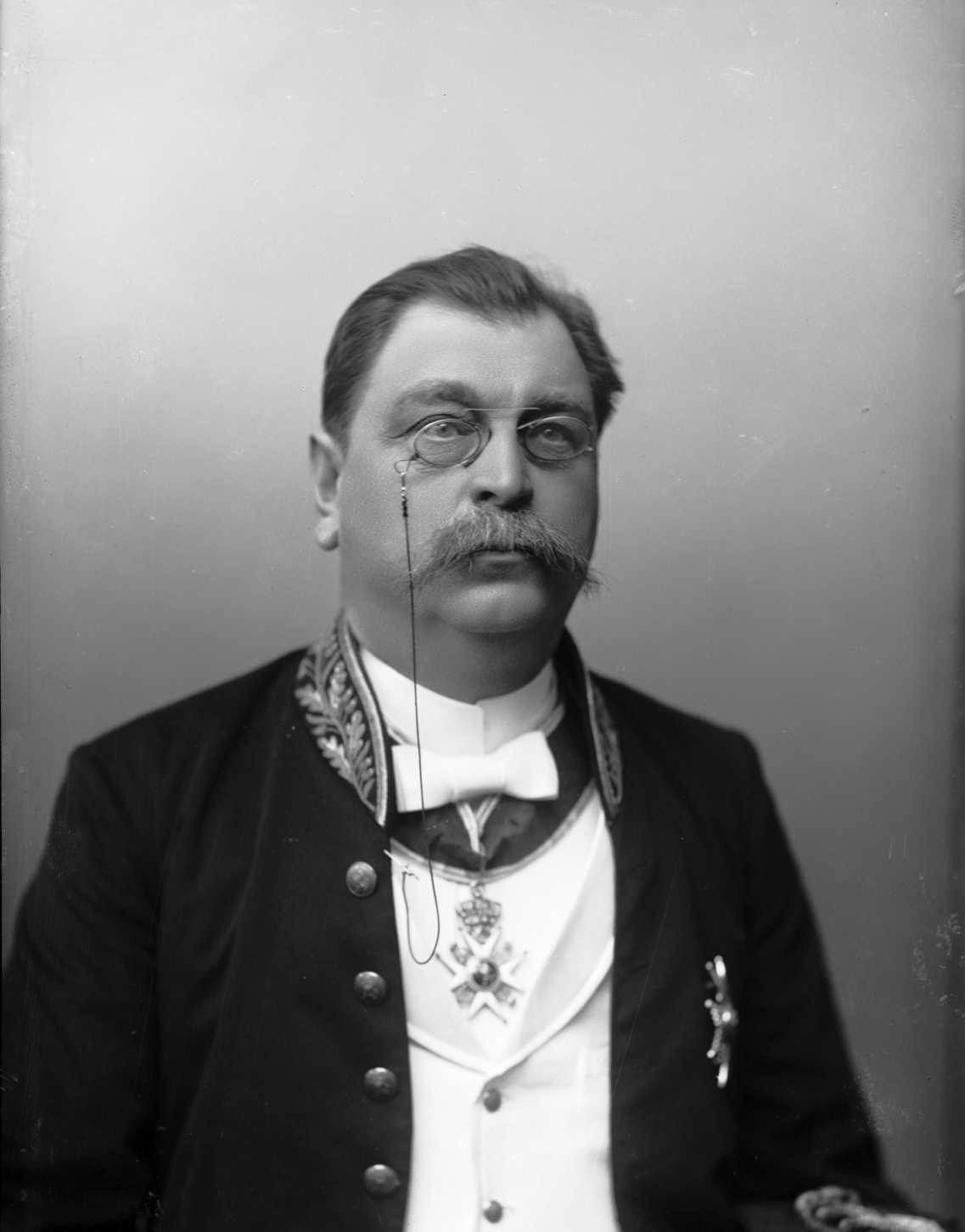
Hans Hein Theodor Nysom

Hans Hein Theodor Nysom (5 September 1845 – 28 August 1903) was a Norwegian politician with the Liberal Party, a cabinet minister and member of Norwegian Parliament.

Nysom was born at Botne in Vestfold county, Norway. He was a grandchild of priest and politician Hans Hein Nysom.

He originally made a career in the military, but from 1874 he worked with canals and timber raftings. From 1884 to 1892 he was the chairman of the Norwegian Polytechnic Society.

In 1891, he was appointed to the cabinet of Prime Minister Johannes Steens. He served as Minister of Auditing and Minister of Labour on 6 March 1891. On 27 November the same year he left the position as Minister of Auditing. He left the Ministry of Labour on 1 May 1893. He was elected to the Norwegian Parliament in 1895, representing the constituency of Kristiania, Hønefoss og Kongsvinger. He was re-elected in 1898.

On 17 February 1898 he became a member of the Council of State Division in Stockholm (Statsrådsavdelingen i Stockholm). He left on 28 February 1899 to become Minister of Labour. On 1 June 1900 he was again transferred to Stockholm, serving until November 1900. He then became Director-General of the Norwegian State Railways.

== Selected works ==
- Handbog i norsk flødningsvæsen, with Axel Borchrevink and Gunnar Sætren.

Political offices
| Preceded by Emil Stang | Norwegian Minister of Auditing; March 1891–November 1891 | Succeeded by Thomas von Westen Engelhart |
| Preceded by Peter Birch-Reichenwald | Norwegian Minister of Labour; 1891–1893 | Succeeded by Peder Nilsen |
| Preceded by Jørgen Løvland | Norwegian Minister of Labour; 1899–1903 | Succeeded by Jørgen Løvland |
Non-profit organization positions
| Preceded by Albert Fenger-Krog | Chairman of the Norwegian Polytechnic Society; 1884–1892 | Succeeded by Knud Bryn |
