= Peter Birch-Reichenwald =

Norwegian politician (1843–1898)

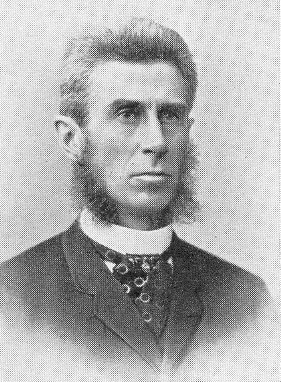
Peter Birch-Reichenwald.

Peter Birch-Reichenwald (29 November 1843 – 8 July 1898) was a Norwegian politician for the Conservative Party.

He was born in Christiania to Christian Birch-Reichenwald and Jacobine Ida Sophie Motzfeldt. His paternal grandfather was Paul Hansen Birch, his maternal grandfather was Peter Motzfeldt. Peter Birch-Reichenwald married Alette Marie Christensen, and the couple had eight children.

He served as mayor of Christiania during 1889.

In July 1889 he was appointed Minister of Labour as a part of the first cabinet Stang. He left in March 1891 when the first cabinet Stang Fell. He was elected to the Norwegian Parliament in 1892, representing the constituency of Kristiania, Hønefoss og Kongsvinger. He only served one three-year term. In March 1894 he was appointed Minister of the Interior as a part of the second cabinet Stang. He replaced Johan Henrik Paasche Thorne. He left in October 1895 when the second cabinet Stang Fell.

He died in the same city he was born. A residential street Birch-Reichenwalds gate, at Sandaker in Oslo, is named after him.

Political offices
Preceded by Christian Homann Schweigaard	Mayor of Kristiania; 1889	Succeeded by Karl Lous
Preceded by Oscar Jacobsen	Minister of Labour; 1889–1891	Succeeded by Hans Hein Theodor Nysom
Preceded by Johan Henrik Paasche Thorne	Minister of the Interior; 1894–1895	Succeeded by Thomas von Westen Engelhart
