= Edvard Liljedahl =

Norwegian politician (1845–1924)

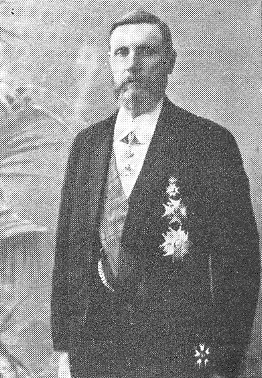

Minister of Education and Church Affairs
- In office 20 February 1912 – 31 January 1913
- Prime Minister: Jens Bratlie
- Preceded by: Just Qvigstad
- Succeeded by: Aasulv Bryggesaa

President of the Storting
- In office 1 January 1906 – 31 December 1909 Serving with Gunnar Knudsen and Carl Berner
- Prime Minister: Jørgen Løvland; Gunnar Knudsen
- Preceded by: Francis Hagerup; Johan H. P. Thorne; Carl Berner
- Succeeded by: Magnus Halvorsen; Wollert Konow; Jens Bratlie

President of the Odelsting
- In office 1 January 1899 – 31 December 1900

Personal details
- Born: Edvard Apolloniussen Liljedahl; 6 August 1845 Vik Municipality, Nordre Bergenhus, United Kingdoms of Sweden and Norway
- Died: 10 October 1924 (aged 79) Vik Municipality, Nordre Bergenhus, Norway
- Party: Liberal; Moderate Liberal; Free-minded Liberal
- Spouse: Barbra Ramsli
- Children: Einar Liljedahl

Edvard Apolloniussen Liljedahl (6 August 1845, in Vik Municipality - 10 October 1924) was a Norwegian politician for the Liberal Party. He was a member of the Council of State Division in Stockholm in 1889, and Minister of Education and Church Affairs in 1912-1913. Liljedahl died on 10 October 1924 in Vik and was buried there.

== Biography ==
Edvard Liljedahl was born to Apollonius Liljedahl and Britha Olsdotter Hopperstad in 1845. He received his degree from the Balestrand Teacher's School in 1864 and another from the Stord Seminary in 1866. For a year, he taught school in Leikanger Municipality. He also worked as an office clerk for a justice of the peace. On 18 October 1869, Liljedahl married Barbra Einarsdotter Ramsli. They were the first couple to be married in the newly-built Kyrkjebø Church. They were the parents of Army general Einar Liljedahl. He sang in the church choir and was the first educated teacher in Kyrkjebø, where he worked from 1867 until 1889. He then went on to become a member of the cabinet in Stockholm from 6 March 1889, until 13 July 1889. Liljedahl later became postmaster in Aalesund in 1891, and then Bergen in 1901. After retiring in 1904 he moved to his property Røytehola (officially Fredheim) in Kyrkjebø Municipality. He cleared the land himself during his time as a parish clerk and a member of parliament, and rented it out when he lived in Ålesund and Bergen. On a visit to Vik, he purchased the Havnen farm from hotel owner Hopstock and moved to Vik Municipality in 1905. He sold the Røytehola property to a quartermaster sergeant named Mo.

=== Agriculture ===
When he took over the property, the Havnen farm consisted of only a barn, a summer cow barn, and a bathhouse. Liljedahl had to build a farmhouse, cow barn, and a stall. He cultivated more land in Havnen and planted a large number of fruit trees (about 250) of which, about half were pear and the rest were apple and cherry. These trees became an important source of income for him in Havnen.

In addition to Røytehola which had been cleared and planted with fruit trees, he also had another farm in Østrem which he sold, and an additional farm farther out in Sogn. In Sogn he planted many plants and also tended the parish garden in Eivindvik.

In 1904 after his postmaster days were over, he went back to Kyrkjebø to live at the Røytehola property, and immediately purchased more land which he cultivated. After his employment as postmaster in Ålesund, he purchased the Vågenes farm in Borgund Municipality, but quickly sold it to his brother-in-law Magnus Ramslie, who was from Vangsnes. He then purchased the Spjelkavik farm, which was a large farm with several cottages, many forests, and mountain bodies of water. It ended up being too large and expensive to operate, so he sold it after a few years, and moved from Ålesund to Bergen.

In addition to farming, he was interested in freshwater fishing and hunting. At that time there were no fish in the large lake of Uldalsvatn in Kyrkjebø. His brother-in-law, merchant Andreas Ramslie, introduced fish there. This later became a source of income for Liljedahl. He started fisheries in many lakes in Sogn and in Uldalsvatn. He also founded the Spjelkavik yarn and fishnet factory, which grew to be a large business that contributed to the construction of many buildings and homes in the area.

== Community involvement ==
In Kyrkjebø, Liljedahl was a community spokesman for many years, a member of the township board for 14 years, and a member of the election board. He was an arbitrator commissioner for 18 years. He was a member of Borgund's town council and Ålesund's city council. He was also a member of the school board in 1884 and the clergy salary board, and he enforced laws in Romsdal county.

He was a member of the Norwegian Parliament for the constituency of Nordre Bergenhus amt from 1870–1891, for Ålesund 1895-1905, and Ytre Sogn from 1906-1909. He was President of the Odelsting from 1899-1900. He was a member of the Council of State Division in Stockholm in 1889, and Minister of Education and Church Affairs in the Bratlie cabinet from 1912 to 1913.

=== Education and church ===
In 1868, the Kyrkjebø district opened its first school, which still stands. At the dedication of the school, some songs were sung that Liljedahl had written. He wrote many songs, one of which is printed in Nordahl Rolfsen's school books. He also wrote a newspaper column in the local press about people. In Kyrkjebø he helped many people to write legal papers and took care of their legal matters while he worked for the justice of the peace. A colleague who attended school with Liljedahl in 1876 wrote, "He was a pleasant man, full of life and desire. I was amazed at how the children clung to him with such high affection and respect." Those who had him as a teacher say that he was unusually serious in school. He carried out his parish clerk duties in an honourable way which left a valuable impression. Many who remember his conversations with the youth on the church floor can still repeat portions of them.

When the weather was bad and the pastor could not come from Lavik Church, Liljedahl spoke from his front porch to the congregation.

He was a Commander of the Order of St. Olav, a Grand Cross of Legion of Honour, and a Knight of the Swedish Order of the Polar Star.

== See also ==
- Jens Bratlie

Political offices
Preceded by Just Knud Qvigstad	Norwegian Minister of Education and Church Affairs; 1912–1913	Succeeded by Aasulv Bryggesaa
