= Oscar Jacobsen =

Norwegian engineer and politician

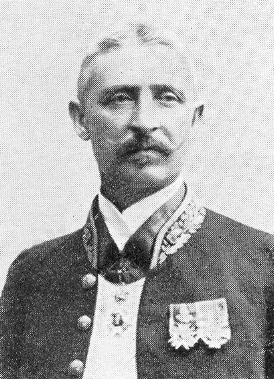
Oscar Jacobsen.

Oscar Jacobsen (1 January 1850 – 6 August 1902) was a Norwegian engineer and politician for the Liberal Party.

== Personal life ==
He was born in Vaage Municipality (now spelled Vågå) in Christians amt, Norway. He was the son of Johanne Georgine Jørgensen and her husband Nils Lauritz Severin Jacobsen. He had several brothers, among them Albert Marius Jacobsen, father of Rolf Jacobsen. Both Albert and Rolf would serve as national politicians.

In 1875 Oscar Jacobsen married Laura Sofie Fredrikke Dahl. The couple had several children, mostly girls.

== Career ==
An engineer by education, he worked in the Norwegian State Railways.

He served in the cabinet Sverdrup as Minister of Labour from 5 March 1888 to 12 July 1889. From 28 August to 30 September 1888 he was also Minister of Interior.

Political offices
Preceded by Aimar August Sørenssen	Minister of Labour; 1888–1889	Succeeded by Peter Birch-Reichenwald
Preceded by Peter Olrog Schjøtt	Minister of Interior; August 1888–September 1888	Succeeded by Lars Knutson Liestøl
