= Johan Frederik Thorne =

Norwegian businessperson and politician

Johan Frederik Thorne (23 December 1801 – 7 March 1854) was a Norwegian businessperson and politician.

He was elected to the Norwegian Parliament in 1833, 1839, 1845 and 1848, representing the constituency of Drammen. He worked as a merchant, timber trader, estate owner and vice consul.

He married Henriette Dorthea Schive, but she died in 1841. In 1842 he married for the second time, this time to Gurina Johanna Paasche. Their son Johan Henrik Paasche Thorne became a notable businessman and politician, and their daughter Sara married businessman and politician Theodor Peterson. Johan Frederik's brother was Søren Wilhelm Thorne.
