= Aimar August Sørenssen =

Norwegian politician

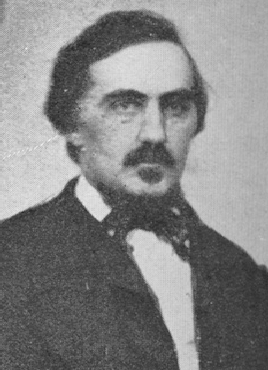
Aimar Sørenssen

Aimar August Sørenssen (6 January 1823 - 2 June 1908) was a Norwegian politician for the Liberal Party.

He was elected to the Norwegian Parliament in 1862, representing the constituency of Smaalenenes Amt. He was a farmer there. He was re-elected in 1865, 1868, 1871, 1874 and 1877. By the last term he had become bailiff (foged).

When the Sverdrup cabinet assumed office in 1884, Sørenssen was brought in as a part of the executive branch of government. He was appointed Minister of Justice and the Police on 26 June. He left on 31 August 1887 to become a member of the Council of State Division in Stockholm the next day. He left this position exactly one year later, having in the meantime served as Minister of Labour from 17 February to 4 March 1888.

Political offices
Preceded by Ludvig Mariboe Benjamin Aubert	Norwegian Minister of Justice and the Police; 1884–1887	Succeeded by Birger Kildal
Preceded by Birger Kildal	Norwegian Minister of Labour; February 1888–March 1888	Succeeded by Oscar Jacobsen
