= Birger Kildal =

Norwegian attorney and businessman (1849–1913)

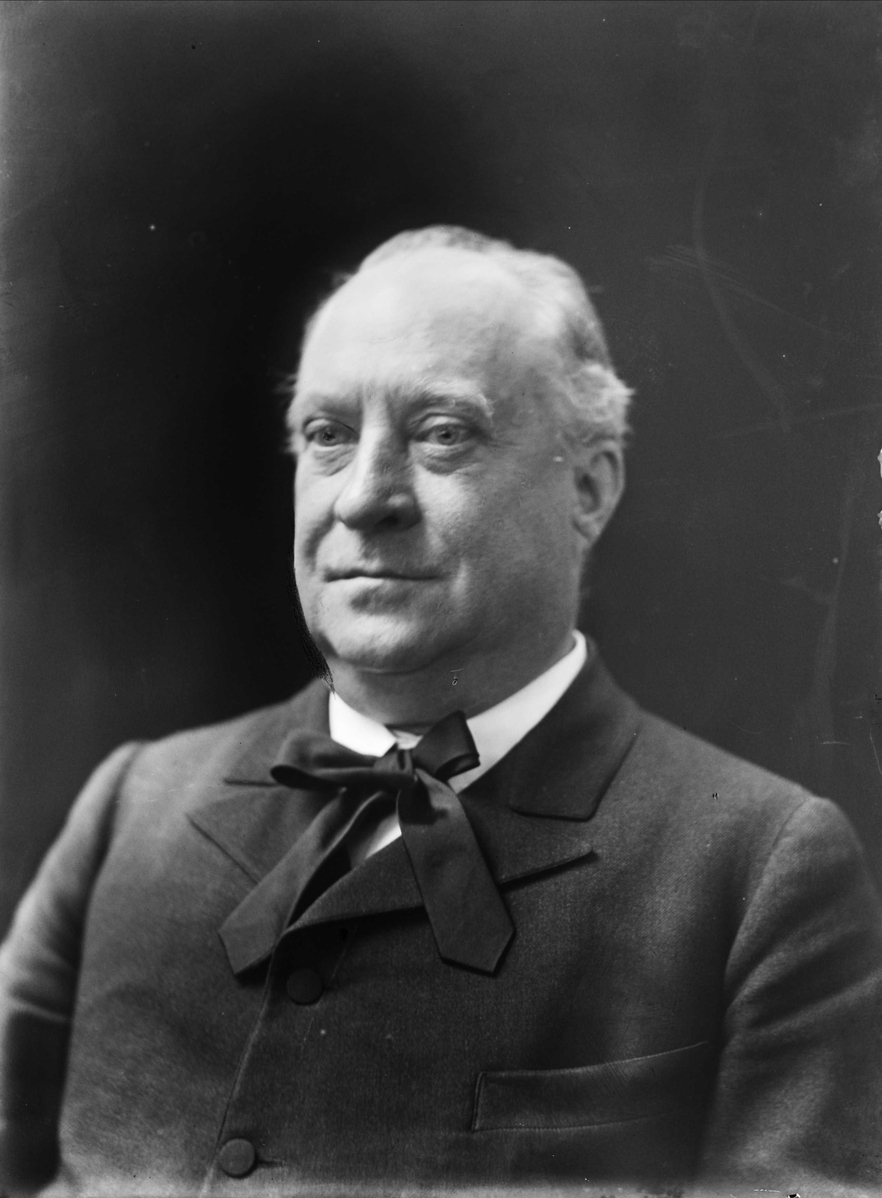

Minister of Finance
- In office 22 October 1903 – 1 September 1904
- Prime Minister: Francis Hagerup
- Preceded by: Gunnar Knudsen
- Succeeded by: Christian Michelsen
- In office 15 November 1895 – 17 February 1898
- Prime Minister: Francis Hagerup
- Preceded by: Fredrik S. Lund
- Succeeded by: Elias Sunde

Minister of Labour
- In office 15 November 1887 – 17 February 1888
- Prime Minister: Johan Sverdrup
- Preceded by: Hans Rasmus Astrup
- Succeeded by: Aimar Sørenssen

Minister of Justice
- In office 15 September 1887 – 15 November 1887
- Prime Minister: Johan Sverdrup
- Preceded by: Aimar Sørenssen
- Succeeded by: Jacob Stang

Minister of Auditing
- In office 22 October 1903 – 1 September 1904
- Prime Minister: Francis Hagerup
- Preceded by: Otto Blehr
- Succeeded by: Paul B. Vogt
- In office 16 July 1884 – 1 November 1886
- Prime Minister: Johan Sverdrup
- Preceded by: Johan Sverdrup
- Succeeded by: Jakob Sverdrup

Minister of Postal Affairs
- In office 1 May 1885 – 31 December 1885
- Prime Minister: Johan Sverdrup
- Preceded by: Christian L. Diriks (1861)
- Succeeded by: Position abolished

Personal details
- Born: 15 April 1849 Christiania, United Kingdoms of Sweden and Norway
- Died: 13 December 1913 (aged 74) Christiania, Norway
- Party: Liberal
- Spouse: Sofie Lund Berger (m. 1872)
- Children: Arne Kildal

Birger Kildal (15 April 1849 – 13 December 1913) was a Norwegian attorney and businessman. He served as politician with the Liberal Party and was appointed District Governor in Romsdal.

== Background ==
Kildal was born at Christiania (now Oslo), Norway. He was the son of businessman and merchant Peter Wessel Wind Kildal and his wife, Christine Marie Gotaas (1817-1900). He took his law degree in 1871 and first worked as a lawyer in Hammerfest. He later went to work in his father's various commercial and industrial enterprises including Lilleborg Fabrikker which his father had founded in 1833.

== Political career ==
Kildal had several cabinet posts in the cabinets of Prime Ministers Johan Sverdrup and Francis Hagerup. He was Minister of Auditing 1884–1886, as well as head of the Ministry of Postal Affairs in 1885. later, he was a member of the Council of State Division in Stockholm 1886-1887 and 1904–1905, Minister of Justice and Minister of Labour 1887, Minister of Labour 1887–1888, Minister of Finance 1895–1898, and Minister of Finance and Minister of Auditing 1903–1904.

During the general election in 1903, he was elected as a representative to the Norwegian Parliament from Christiania, Hønefoss and Kongsvinger. In 1906, Kildal was appointed district governor in Romsdal and held this office until his death.

== Personal life ==
Birger Kildal was married to Sofienlund Berger (1851-1940). They were the parents of author Arne Kildal.
