= Albert Marius Jacobsen =

Norwegian politician

Albert Marius Jacobsen (28 December 1838 – 17 October 1909) was a Norwegian military officer and politician for the Liberal Party.

== Personal life ==
He was born in Vaage Municipality (now spelled Vågå) as the second son of Johanne Georgine Jørgensen and her husband Nils Lauritz Severin Jacobsen. He had several brothers, among them Oscar Jacobsen.

In 1863 Oscar Jacobsen married Hansine Fredrikke Schøyen. The couple had two sons. Their son Rolf Jacobsen became a jurist and national politician.

== Career ==
He was elected to the Norwegian Parliament in 1877, representing the constituency of Hedemarkens Amt. He was re-elected in 1880 and 1883, and from Buskerud Amt in 1886. From 1884 he represented the Liberal Party.

A military officer, he held the rank of Premier Lieutenant when first elected to Parliament, later advancing to Captain. Towards the end of his career he worked in the Office of the Auditor General of Norway.
