= Theodor Peterson =

Norwegian businessperson and politician

Theodor Peterson (12 June 1839 – 9 January 1888) was a Norwegian businessperson and politician. He is known for his development of the family company M. Peterson & Søn, and also served one term in the Norwegian Parliament.

== Personal life ==
He was born in 1839 as a son of Peter Christian Peterson and Hedevig Jacoba Sandberg. He was a grandson of Momme Peterson, who in 1801 had founded the company M. Peterson & Søn. In July 1862 he married Sara Margrethe Caroline Thorne, a sister of Johan Henrik Paasche Thorne and daughter of Johan Frederik Thorne.

== Career ==
The family company M. Peterson & Søn had been expanded from its 1801 origins as a general store, to a larger company with a spinning mill, timber trade and regular shipping. Theodor Peterson discontinued the shipping operations, instead choosing to venture into the pulp and paper industry. Having bought Moss Iron Works together with Johan Henrik Paasche Thorne and Georg Wankel in 1875, he became the sole proprietor in 1878 as he took over Thorne and Wankel's shares in exchange of his company's ships. Then, he used the site of the iron works to develop new industry. The factory Moss Cellulosefabrik was built in November 1882, and in 1883 production of cellulose sulfate commenced there. After his death, this business field was further developed, first by his wife Sara but mainly under the leadership of their son Hans Blom Peterson. He was the managing director from 1901 to 1954, and also served as mayor of Moss.

In politics, Peterson was elected to the Norwegian Parliament in 1871, representing the constituency of Moss og Drøbak. He only served one term. In addition, he was a consul.
