= Peder Kjerschow =

Norwegian judge

Peder Kjerschow (5 June 1857 – 10 December 1944) was a Norwegian judge.

He was born in Tromsøe, as a son of Christian Collett Kjerschow and grandson of Peder Christian Hersleb Kjerschow. Through marriage he was a nephew of Jacob Andreas Michelsen and first cousin of Christian Michelsen. He was also a great-grandfather of Arild Kjerschow, born 1944.

He became a public prosecutor in 1891, presiding judge in 1902 and Norwegian Director of Public Prosecutions in 1911. He retired in 1929. He issued several books.

Legal offices
Preceded by Harald Smedal	Norwegian Director of Public Prosecutions; 1911–1929	Succeeded by Haakon Sund
