= Halvor Olaus Christensen =

Norwegian politician

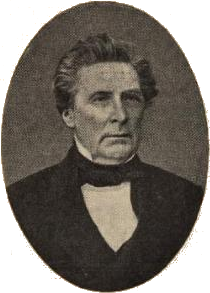
Halvor Olaus Christensen.

Halvor Olaus Christensen (18 February 1800 – 10 June 1891) was a Norwegian politician.

== Biography ==
He was born at Stavanger in Rogaland, Norway. He was the son of Christian Christensen Kollerud and father of Thorvald Christian Christensen.

Christensen passed his legal exam in 1822. He was elected to the Norwegian Parliament in 1833, 1836, 1839, 1842, 1845, 1848, 1854, 1862, 1865, 1868 and 1871. He represented the constituency of Stavanger, which was renamed Stavanger og Haugesund on the last two occasions. He worked as a stipendiary magistrate (byfoged) and town clerk (byskriver) throughout the whole period, having been appointed in 1832, as well as chief of police only during the first six terms. During the 1848 term he was President of the Storting, together with Georg Prahl Harbitz, Hans Riddervold and Carl Valentin Falsen.

Political offices
Preceded by Niels Arntzen Sem; Søren A. W. Sørenssen; Carl Valentin Falsen	President of the Storting; 1848	Succeeded by Hans Jørgen C. Aall; Georg Prahl Harbitz
