= Wilhelm Olssøn =

Norwegian military officer and politician

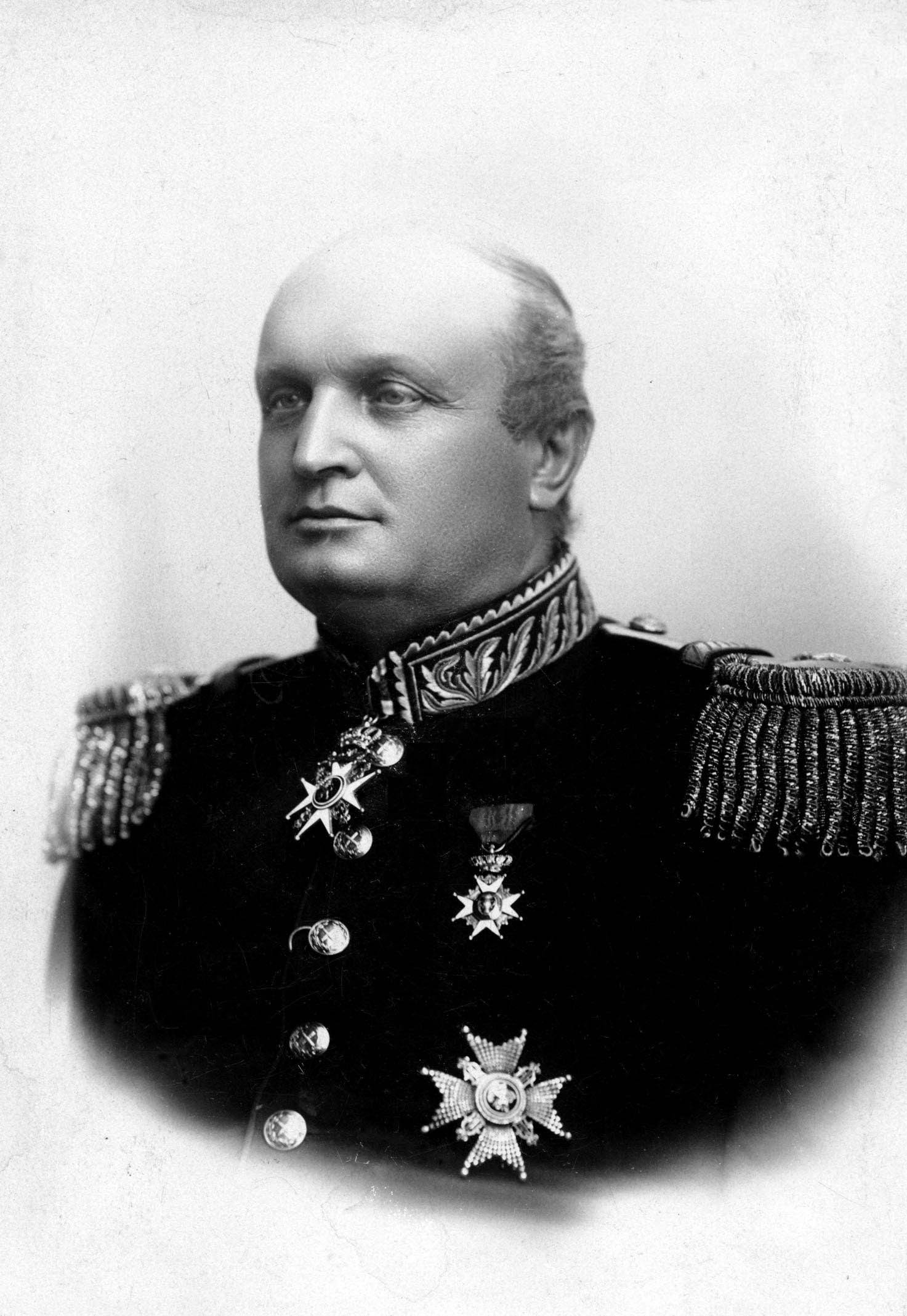

Minister of Defence
- In office 11 March 1905 – 25 May 1907
- Prime Minister: Christian Michelsen
- Preceded by: Oscar Strugstad
- Succeeded by: Christian Michelsen (acting)
- In office 27 April 1895 – 17 February 1898
- Prime Minister: Emil Stang; Francis Hagerup
- Preceded by: Johannes Harbitz
- Succeeded by: Peter T. Holst
- In office 2 May 1893 – 15 July 1894
- Prime Minister: Emil Stang
- Preceded by: Peter T. Holst
- Succeeded by: Johannes Harbitz

Personal details
- Born: Christian Wilhelm Engel Bredal Olssøn; 4 April 1844 Horten, Vestfold, United Kingdoms of Sweden and Norway
- Died: 3 November 1915 (aged 71) Ringsaker, Hedmark, Norway
- Party: Conservative
- Spouse(s): Louise Hoel (m. 1885) Marianne Hoel

Christian Wilhelm Engel Bredal Olssøn (5 April 1844 – 3 November 1915) was a Norwegian military officer and politician.

Olssøn was born in Horten in Vestfold, Norway. He was the son of Edvard Olssøn (1820–1867) and Leonore Rebecca Bredal (1820–1910). He received a military education at the Norwegian Military Academy (1866) and Norwegian Military College (1870). He received additional education at the Royal Institute of Technology in Stockholm (1872–1874).

He was appointed major general in 1896. In 1898, he was commander at Oscarsborg, 1899 inspector general for coastal artillery. In 1907, he became lieutenant-general. He retired from military service in 1912 as commanding general. He served as Minister of Defence 1893–1894, 1895–1898, 1905–1907, and member of the Council of State Division in Stockholm 1894–1895.

Military offices
Preceded by O. Hansen	Commanding General in Norway; 1910–1912	Succeeded by Einar Wilhelm Anton Martin Krohn
