= Olaj Olsen =

Norwegian politician (1851–1920)

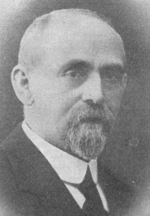
- Born: April 6, 1851; Bergen, Norway
- Died: June 16, 1920 (aged 69); Bergen, Norway
- Occupations: Jurist, politician

Olaj Johan Olsen (6 April 1851 – 16 June 1920) was a Norwegian jurist and politician.

He made a career as a civil servant in various government ministries. He was later promoted to serve as Minister of Justice and the Police and Minister of Finance and Customs in 1888 and 1889, member of the Council of State Division in Stockholm from 1896 to 1897 and Minister of the Interior from 1897 to 1898.

He was also County Governor of Nordre Bergenhus amt from 1889. In 1902, he left this post to become burgomaster of his hometown Bergen.

Government offices
Preceded by Jacob Stang	Minister of Justice and the Police; 1888	Succeeded by Walter Scott Dahl
Preceded by Baard Madsen Haugland	Minister of Finance and Customs; 1888–1889	Succeeded by Peder Olrog Schjøtt
Preceded by Edvard Hagerup Bull (caretaker minister)	Minister of Finance and Customs; 1889	Succeeded by Evald Rygh
Preceded by Thomas von Westen Engelhart	Minister of the Interior; 1897–1898	Succeeded by Georg August Thilesen
Preceded by Carl Oppen	County Governor of Nordre Bergenhus amt 1889–1902	Succeeded by John Utheim
