= Christian Christensen Kollerud =

Norwegian farmer and politician

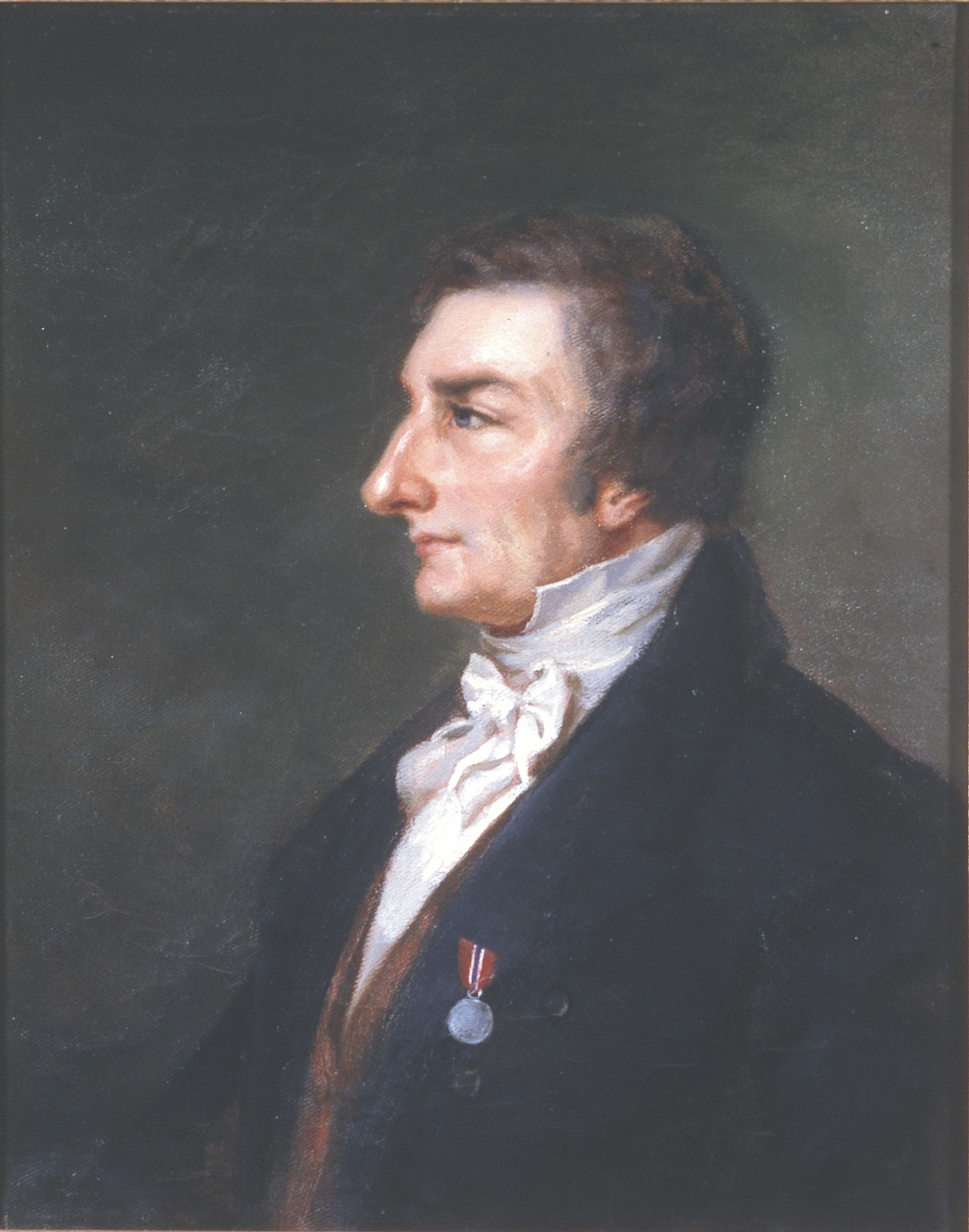
- Born: 6 August 1767; Setskog, Norway
- Died: 28 March 1833 (aged 65)

Christian Christensen Kollerud (6 August 1767 – 28 March 1833) was a Norwegian farmer who served as a representative at the Norwegian Constitutional Assembly.

Christian Christensen Kollerud was born at Setskog in Høland (now Aurskog-Holand), in Akershus, Norway. He attended school in Fredrikshald (now Halden) while living with future Norwegian Government minister, Carsten Tank at Rød Herregård, the family estate at Halden of merchant Nils Carstensen Tank (1725–1801). Christian Christensen Kollerud owned several farms including Øvre Kollerud in Høland as well as operating a sawmill.

He represented Akershus at the Norwegian Constituent Assembly in 1814, together with Peder Anker and Christian Magnus Falsen.

He was married in 1788 with Mette Marie Colstad (1768–1816). They were the parents of Halvor Olaus Christensen and Thorvald Christian Christensen (1833–1913), both of whom served in the Norwegian Parliament.

== Related Reading ==
- Holme, Jørn (2014) De kom fra alle kanter - Eidsvollsmennene og deres hus(Oslo: Cappelen Damm) ISBN 978-82-02-44564-5
