= Francis Hagerup =

Norwegian politician

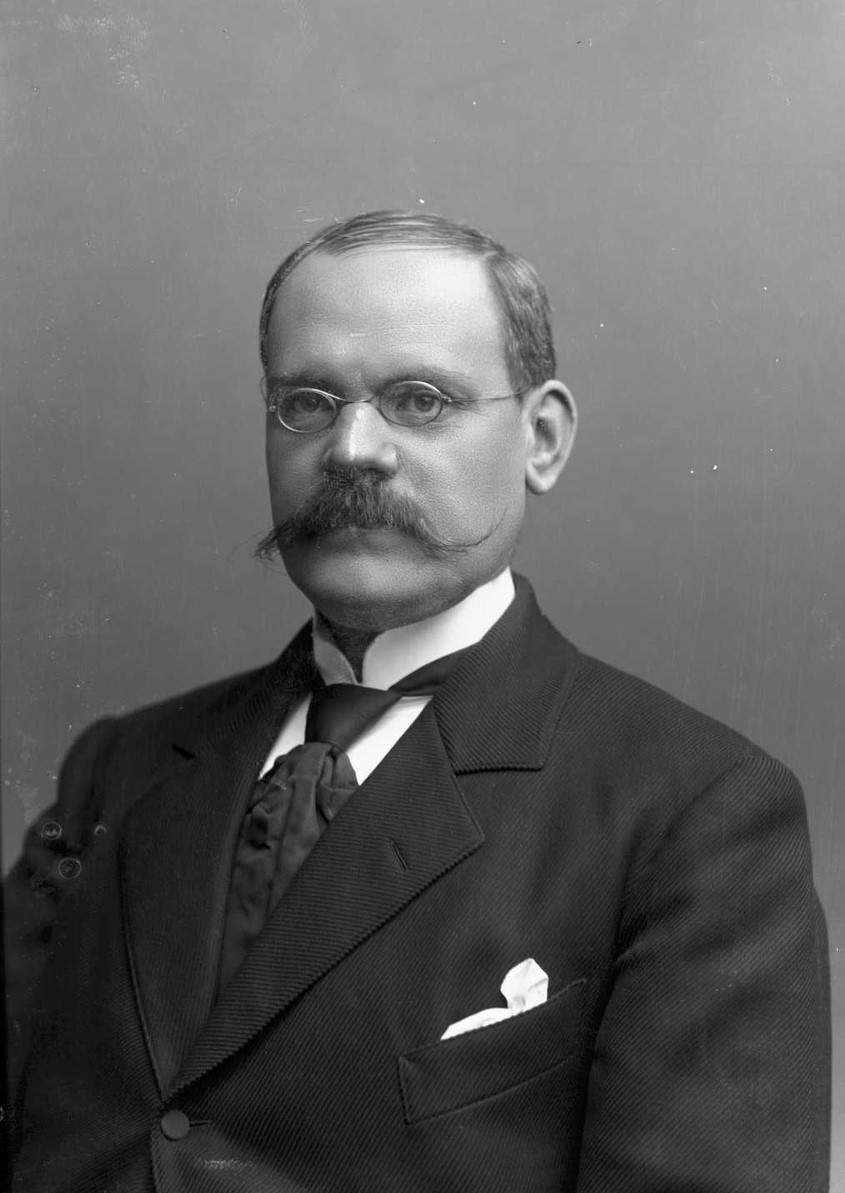
- Francis Hagerup by the mid 1890's

Prime Minister of Norway
- In office 22 October 1903 – 11 March 1905
- Monarch: Oscar II
- Preceded by: Otto Blehr
- Succeeded by: Christian Michelsen
- In office 14 October 1895 – 17 February 1898
- Monarch: Oscar II
- Preceded by: Emil Stang
- Succeeded by: Johannes Steen

Minister of Justice
- In office 22 October 1903 – 11 March 1905
- Prime Minister: Himself
- Preceded by: Søren T. Årstad
- Succeeded by: Christian Michelsen
- In office 14 October 1895 – 15 August 1897
- Prime Minister: Himself
- Preceded by: Ernst Motzfeldt
- Succeeded by: Harald Smedal
- In office 2 May 1893 – 15 July 1894
- Prime Minister: Emil Stang
- Preceded by: Ole Anton Qvam
- Succeeded by: Ernst Motzfeldt

Minister of Finance
- In office 9 August 1895 – 14 October 1895
- Prime Minister: Emil Stang
- Preceded by: Ole Furu
- Succeeded by: Fredrik Stang Lund

Minister of Auditing
- In office 15 August 1897 – 17 February 1898
- Prime Minister: Himself
- Preceded by: Harald Smedal
- Succeeded by: Johannes Steen

Member of the Council of State Division
- In office 15 July 1894 – 9 August 1895 Serving with Wilhelm Olssøn and Anton C. Bang
- Prime Minister: Emil Stang
- Preceded by: Ernst Motzfeldt; Johannes W. Harbitz
- Succeeded by: Ole Furu

President of the Storting
- In office 1 January 1903 – 31 December 1906 Serving with Johan Thorne and Carl Berner
- Monarch: Oscar II
- Prime Minister: Otto Blehr; Himself; Christian Michelsen
- Preceded by: Edvard Liljedahl; Carl Berner
- Succeeded by: Edvard Liljedahl; Gunnar Knudsen; Carl Berner

Leader of the Conservative Party
- In office 1899–1902
- Preceded by: Emil Stang
- Succeeded by: Ole L. Skattebøl

Personal details
- Born: George Francis Hagerup; 22 January 1853 Horten, Vestfold, United Kingdoms of Sweden and Norway
- Died: 8 February 1921 (aged 68) Kristiania, Norway
- Party: Conservative
- Spouse: Frederikke Dorothea Bødtker (m. 1850)
- Occupation: Lawyer; Politician; Diplomat

George Francis Hagerup (22 January 1853 – 8 February 1921) was a Norwegian law professor, diplomat, politician for the Conservative Party and women's rights advocate. He was the prime minister of Norway from 1895 to 1898 and from 1903 to 1905, and leader of the Conservative Party from 1899 to 1902. As a legal scholar, he is known for his contributions to the development of public international law, and was chairman of the Institut de Droit International. He was his party's most active supporter of women's suffrage, and was a co-founder, board member and honorary member of the Norwegian Association for Women's Rights.

== Biography ==
Francis Hagerup grew up at Horten in Vestfold, Norway. He was a son of admiral and cabinet minister Henrik Steffens Hagerup (1806–1859) and Nicoline Christine Jenssen (1808–1862). He graduated with the cand.jur. degree at the Royal Frederick University in 1876, received a grant to study abroad (which he did at the universities of Leipzig, Munich and Paris) and became a research fellow at the Royal Frederick University in 1879. He obtained the dr.juris degree in 1885, and was professor of law at the Royal Frederick University from 1887 to 1906. He was minister of justice in the Second cabinet Stang from 2 May 1893 to 14 October 1895. In August 1895 he was finance minister. He was a member of the Storting from 1901 to 1906.

He served as Prime Minister of Norway for two terms: first from 14 October 1895; secondly from 22 October 1903. In social policy, Hagerup's time as prime minister saw the passage of a child care law in 1896 that increased the power of local authorities and courts over neglected and abused children. Following his two bouts as prime minister, he served as ambassador to Copenhagen, The Hague, and Brussels. From 1916 he was ambassador in Stockholm.

Hagerup was passionately involved in the development of public international law. From 1897 he was member of the Institut de Droit International, of which he became the chairman in 1912. In 1907 he headed the Norwegian delegation at the second peace conference in The Hague. He was also delegate at international conferences regarding admiralty law. In 1920 he led the Norwegian delegation when the League of Nations convened for the first time in Geneva. The same year he was elected to the Law committee under the League council. In 1888, he founded Tidsskrift for Retsvidenskab (Journal of Jurisprudence), and served as its editor until his death.

Hagerup was also member of the Norwegian Nobel Committee from 1 January 1907 until his death in 1921.

Hagerup was the most prominent Conservative Party politician to support women's suffrage and was active in the women's rights movement. In 1884 he was a co-founder of the Norwegian Association for Women's Rights and he was also a member of the first board of the association. In 1914 he became an honorary member of the association.

== Personal life ==
He was married in 1880 to Frederikke Dorothea Bødtker (1853-1919). He died in Kristiania (now Oslo) and was buried at Vår Frelsers gravlund.

== Other sources ==
- George Francis Hagerup biography at government.no (taken from Norsk Biografisk Leksikon - Norwegian Biographical Encyclopedia)
- Thane, Pat (1996) Foundations of the Welfare State (Longman Social Policy 2nd edition) ISBN 9780582279520

Political offices
Preceded by Emil Stang	Prime Minister of Norway; 1895–1898	Succeeded by Johannes Steen
Preceded by Otto Albert Blehr	Prime Minister of Norway; 1903–1905	Succeeded by Christian Michelsen
