= Johan Thorne =

Norwegian politician (1843–1920)

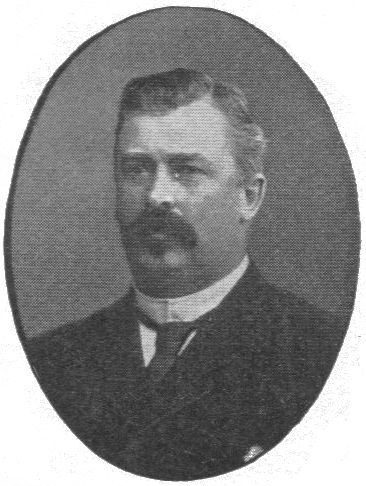
Johan Henrik Paasche Thorne

Johan Henrich (or Henrik) Paasche Thorne (18 August 1843 – 18 May 1920) was a Norwegian businessperson and politician for the Conservative Party. He served as mayor of Moss as well as five terms in the Norwegian Parliament, and was Minister of the Interior from 1889 to 1890 and 1893 to 1894.

He was born in Drammen as the son of Johan Frederik Thorne and Gurina Johanna Paasche. After graduating from secondary school ("Latin school"), he spent a few years at sea, and also learned the skills of a merchant. He settled in Sarpsborg in 1864, working as a timber trader and ship-owner, and relocated to Moss in 1869. Here, he became a co-owner of the company M. Peterson & Søn. M. Peterson & Søn was a family business, but Johan's younger sister Sara had married its owner, Theodor Peterson. Peterson, Thorne and Georg Reinholdt Wankel had bought Moss Iron Works together in 1875. In 1878 Thorne and Wankel exchanged the shares in the iron works with M. Peterson & Søn's fleet, which Peterson discontinued. Thorne was also the director of the local savings bank from 1875 to 1886, and served as mayor of Moss municipality from 1880 to 1889.

He was also elected to the Norwegian Parliament in 1883, representing the constituency of Moss og Drøbak. He was re-elected in 1886 and 1889. On 13 July 1889, when the first cabinet Stang assumed office, he was appointed as Minister of the Interior. He stayed in this position until 1 July 1890, when he was dispatched as a member of the Council of State Division in Stockholm. He lost this job on 5 March 1891, when the first cabinet Stang fell. Later, when the second cabinet Stang assumed office on 2 May 1893, Thorne made a comeback as Minister of the Interior. He left on 2 March 1894, having fallen out with Prime Minister Emil Stang. In 1895 he was elected to serve a fourth term in the Norwegian Parliament. He now represented the constituency Smaalenenes Amt, having moved from Moss to Rygge in 1890 to settle at Evje manor. In 1895 he also served as a member of the Union Committee. He was not re-elected in 1897, but returned in 1904 to serve one final term. During this term, he was a President of the Storting together with Carl Berner. Thorne marked himself as a supporter of the sitting second cabinet Hagerup, and their policy to negotiate with Sweden in matters regarding the Union. In 1905, it became clear that this policy had failed, and the second cabinet Hagerup resigned as part of the build-up for the dissolution of the union.

Thorne was also praeces in the Royal Norwegian Society for Development from 1896. He was proclaimed a Commander, First Class of the Royal Norwegian Order of St. Olav in 1893, and was also decorated as a Commander of the Swedish Order of the Polar Star.

Political offices
| Preceded by Georg August Thilesen | Norwegian Minister of the Interior; 1889–1890 | Succeeded by Ole Andreas Furu |
| Preceded by Wollert Konow (H) | Norwegian Minister of the Interior; 1893–1894 | Succeeded by Peter Birch-Reichenwald |
| Preceded by Edvard Liljedahl; Carl Berner | President of the Storting; 1903–1906 | Succeeded by Edvard Liljedahl; Gunnar Knudsen; Carl Berner |
