= Georg Prahl Harbitz =

Norwegian politician

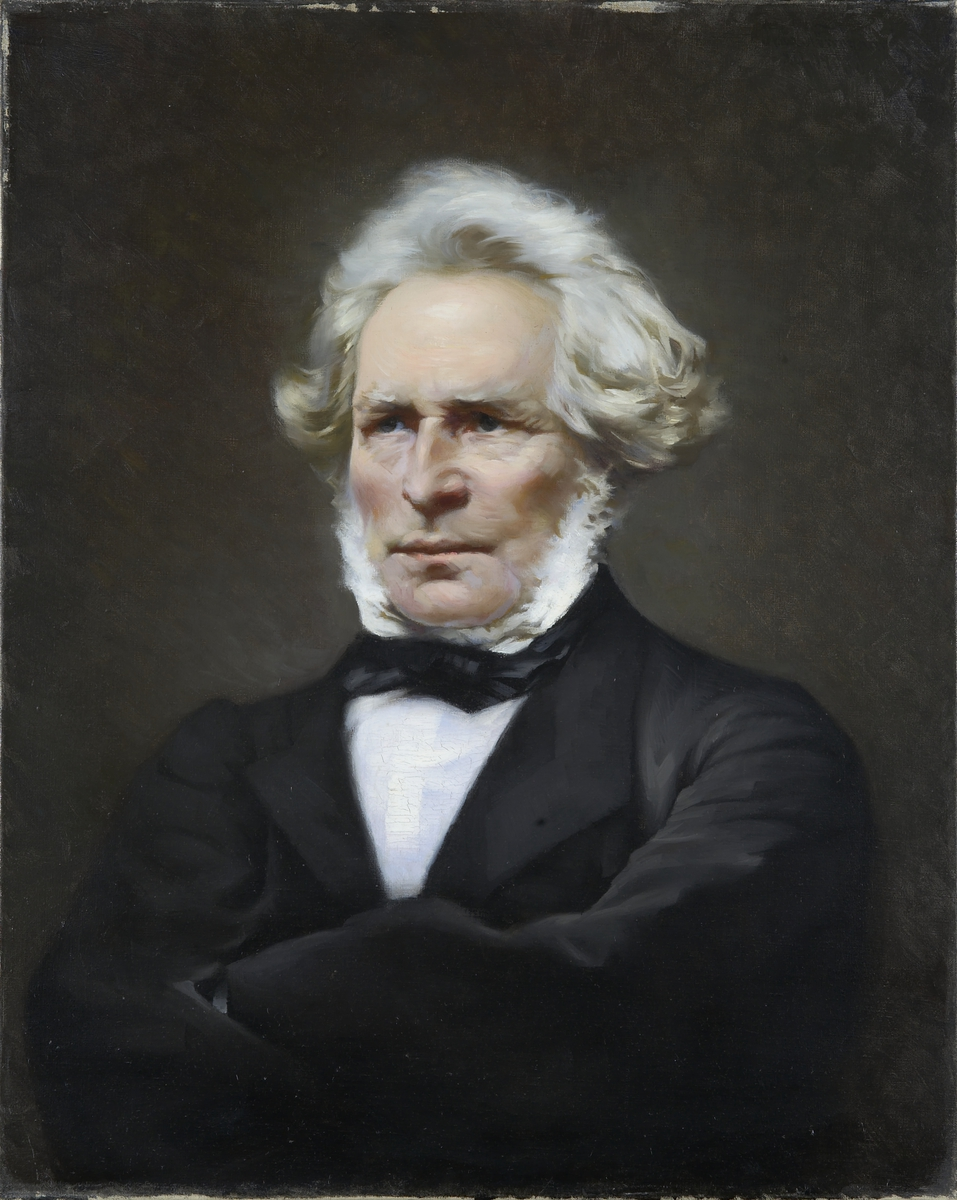

Member of Parliament
- In office 1836–1870

President of the Storting
- In office 1848–1869

Personal details
- Born: 26 June 1802 Haus, Norway
- Died: 22 November 1889 (aged 87) Abbediengen, Vestre Aker, Norway
- Party: Independent
- Spouse: Maren Mariken Hof
- Children: Johannes Winding Harbitz, 7 other children
- Profession: Vicar

Georg Prahl Harbitz (26 June 1802 – 22 November 1889) was a Norwegian priest and politician. He was a member of Parliament for multiple terms and served as President of the Storting.

== Background ==
He was born in Haus (now part of Osterøy Municipality) in Søndre Bergenhus Amt (county), Norway to innkeeper Nils Harbitz and his wife Elisabet Christine Ibsen. His father died when Georg was eight years old, and he was eventually sent to the wealthy family Prahl in Bergen for upbringing. Here, he was inspired to undertake academic studies. He graduated as cand.theol. in 1825. He was assigned by the Church of Norway, the post as vicar (sogneprest) at Askvoll Church in Nordre Bergenhus Amt.

== Career ==
He became involved in politics and when local government was introduced in Norway, Harbitz served as mayor of Askvoll Municipality from 1837 to 1839. He was elected to the Norwegian Parliament in 1836 and 1839, representing the constituency of Nordre Bergenhus Amt. From the start he was known favour the farmers' interest, a political current which began making its mark in Parliament from 1830. He was conservative in Constitutional matters.

He left Askvoll in 1839, his wife having died the same year. He was assigned the position of vicar for Slidre Church, in Slidre Municipality in Christians Amt. While stationed here, he was elected to the Norwegian Parliament in 1842 and 1845. In 1847 he applied for the position as garrison priest in Christiania; however, he discovered that he was not looked kindly upon there, and returned to Christians Amt. In the meantime, Slidre Municipality had been split into Øystre Slidre Municipality and Vestre Slidre Municipality; Harbitz became vicar for Vestre Slidre. He was elected to Parliament two more times, in 1848 and 1851. During the 1848 term he was President of the Storting, together with Halvor Olaus Christensen, Hans Riddervold and Carl Valentin Falsen.

He then decided to leave Vestre Slidre for financial reasons. Reportedly, the wage was low and often delayed. Harbitz applied for the vicarship in Nøtterø Church, and began this tenure in 1852.

Representing the constituency of Jarlsberg og Laurvigs Amt, he was elected to Parliament in 1854, 1857, 1859, 1862, 1865 and 1868. He continued to serve as President of the Storting for each of these terms. In 1864 he was the sole holder of this position, and held the principal speeches commemorating the fiftieth anniversaries of the Constitution of Norway (on 17 May) and the Union between Sweden and Norway (on 4 November).

Having chosen to not stand for parliamentary re-election in 1870, he sought retirement from his vicarship in December 1878, and finally left the position when a replacement was found in April 1879. He was granted a 6,000 kr yearly pension. His successor was Johan Nordahl Brun, not to be confused with the poet of the same name. Georg Prahl Harbitz moved to Abbediengen in Vestre Aker, where his son Gottfried Harbitz resided. He died in 1889 and was buried next to his wife in the churchyard of Askvoll Church. He had been issued the Grand Cross of the Order of St. Olav in 1864, as well as the Grand Cross of the Swedish Order of the Polar Star.

== Personal life ==
Georg Prahl Harbitz was married to Maren Mariken Hof (1806–1839) from Aker. The couple had four daughters and four sons, the oldest was born in 1827 and the youngest was born just before Maren died in 1839. Georg Prahl Harbitz did not remarry. Their oldest son Johannes Winding Harbitz became a parliament member and government minister. Another son Georg Prahl Harbitz, Jr. became a vicar as well, and married the sister of politician Walter Scott Dahl. Georg Prahl Harbitz had struggled with health problems, so did several of his children.

Political offices
Preceded by Niels Arntzen Sem; Søren A. W. Sørenssen; Carl Valentin Falsen	President of the Storting; 1848–1869	Succeeded by P. Daniel B. W. Kildal; Johan Sverdrup
