= Fredrik Stang Lund =

Norwegian politician (1859–1922)

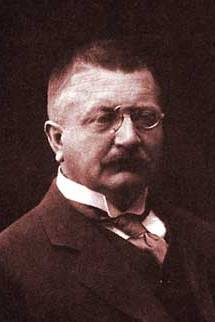
Fredrik Stang Lund.

Fredrik Stang Lund (17 November 1859 – 13 June 1922) was a Norwegian politician for the Liberal Party.

He was the mayor of Oslo briefly in 1895.

On 14 October, 1895, he was appointed to the first cabinet Hagerup as both Minister of Auditing and Minister of Finance. He left the Minister of Finance post on 1 November 1895, and the Minister of Auditing post exactly one year later, only to become a member of the Council of State Division in Stockholm. On 1 August, 1897, he was appointed Minister of Labour. He held this post until 16 February, 1898, when the first cabinet Hagerup fell.

Political offices
Preceded by Evald Rygh	Mayor of Oslo; 1895	Succeeded by Elias Sunde
Preceded by Francis Hagerup	Norwegian Minister of Finance; October 1895	Succeeded by Birger Kildal
Preceded by Johannes Winding Harbitz	Norwegian Minister of Auditing; 1895–1896	Succeeded by Harald Smedal
Preceded by Peder Nilsen	Norwegian Minister of Labour; 1897–1898	Succeeded by Jørgen Løvland
