= Momme Peterson =

Norwegian politician

Momme Peterson (28 March 1771 – 4 March 1835) was a Danish-Norwegian businessperson and politician. He is best known for founding the company M. Peterson & Søn.

== Biography ==
Peterson was born at Lindholm in the Slesvig. He was the son of Peter Christian Andresen (1715–1773) and Sissel Hanses (1726–1773). After distillery training at Flensburg in Schleswig, Peterson came to Moss in 1793 to begin as a distillery master for wholesaler Johann Gude. He settled in the city of Moss and acquired burghership in 1801. In the same year he founded his own company, a general store with various groceries and manufactured goods. After several of the older, established trading houses went bankrupt during the 1820s, Peterson remained one of the large companies in the city. He later opened a tobacco spinning mill and also expanded to trade with timber. The name M. Peterson & Søn was taken in 1828.

Momme Peterson was elected to the Norwegian Parliament in 1821, representing the constituency of Moss. Here, he marked himself as an opponent of King Charles XIV John, who had several fruitless attempts to strengthen his control over the Norwegian Parliament. Peterson only served one term.

After his death, the company would expand into regular shipping, but later, under the leadership of Momme Peterson's grandson Theodor this was discontinued. Instead, Theodor and another descendant Hans Blom Peterson successfully expanded into the pulp and paper industry.
