= Rolf Jacobsen (politician) =

Norwegian jurist and politician

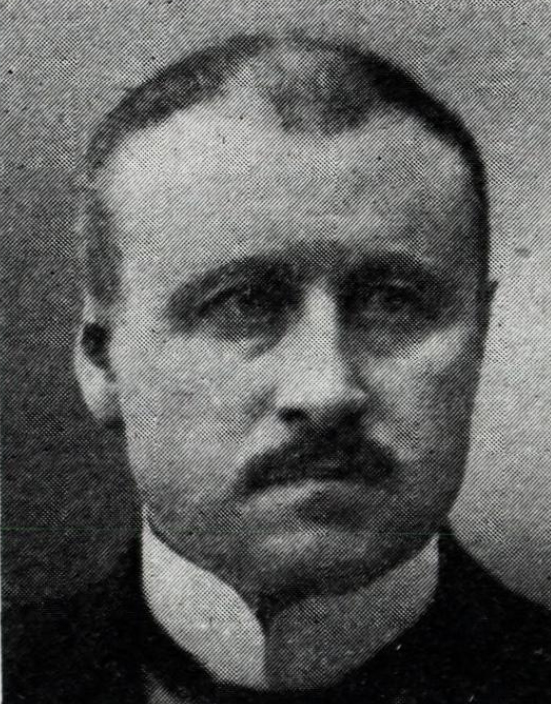

Minister of Defence
- In office 25 July 1924 – 5 March 1926
- Prime Minister: J. L. Mowinckel
- Preceded by: Karl W. Wefring
- Succeeded by: Karl W. Wefring

Member of the Norwegian Parliament
- In office 1 January 1913 – 31 December 1918
- Constituency: Nordre Salten 4th

Mayor of Narvik
- In office 1 January 1911 – 31 December 1911
- Preceded by: Karl Kristian Høiem
- Succeeded by: Albert Zintzen

Personal details
- Born: 30 November 1865 Fredrikstad, Østfold, Sweden-Norway
- Died: 22 February 1942 (aged 76)
- Party: Liberal

Rolf Jacobsen (30 November 1865 – 22 February 1942) was a Norwegian jurist and politician for the Liberal Party. He was a mayor of Narvik Municipality, two-term member of the Parliament of Norway as well as Minister of Defence from 1924 to 1926.

== Personal life ==
He was born in Fredrikstad as the son of military officer and politician Albert Marius Jacobsen (1838–1909) and his wife Hansine Fredrikke Schøyen (1838–1915). His uncle Oscar Jacobsen was a politician too. He had one older brother.

== Career ==
Rolf Jacobsen enrolled as a student in 1881, and graduated as cand.jur. in 1885. From 1885 to 1890, Jacobsen was an attorney in Nordre Gudbrandsdalen, working under district stipendiary magistrate Walter Scott Dahl. Jacobsen served as acting district stipendiary magistrate for a total of three years, while Dahl was a member of Parliament. Jacobsen then moved to Kristiania to work as a lawyer. From 1893 to 1903, he was a barrister, with access to Supreme Court cases. In 1903, he was appointed as district stipendiary magistrate at the Steigen District Court.

While stationed here he served as mayor of Narvik Municipality from 1910 to 1912. He was also a member of the board of the savings bank from 1904 to 1906, chaired the school board from 1911 to 1912 and acted as deputy chair of Narvik Harbour during the same period. He was elected to the Parliament of Norway in 1913 and 1916, representing the constituency of Nordre Salten. In 1917, he was appointed district stipendiary magistrate in Vinger and Odal. He was a member of the municipal council of Vinger Municipality from 1919 to 1925 and 1928 to 1936, and chaired the county chapter of the Liberal Party in 1929.

On 25 July 1924, he was appointed Minister of Defence in the Mowinckel's First Cabinet. He lost the job when Mowinckel's First Cabinet fell in March 1926. Having taken a hiatus from the job as district stipendiary magistrate during this period, he subsequently returned to this post. He left the magistrate in 1936 to become a lawyer in Oslo.

Jacobsen was also active in the temperance movement.

Political offices
Preceded by Karl Wilhelm Wefring	Norwegian Minister of Defence; 1924–1926	Succeeded by Karl Wilhelm Wefring
