= Sivert Andreas Nielsen (1823–1904) =

Norwegian politician

- Born: 8 October 1823; Brønnøy, Norway
- Died: 18 August 1904 (aged 80)
- Years active: 1895-1897
- Political party: Liberal Party

Sivert Andreas Nielsen (8 October 1823 - 18 August 1904) was a Norwegian politician for the Liberal Party.

He was born in the prestegjeld of Brønnøy.

He was elected to the Norwegian Parliament in 1859. He was not re-elected in 1861, but returned in 1865 to serve twelve more terms. When political parties were introduced in the 1880s, Nielsen joined the Liberal Party. He served four terms as President of the Storting.

Preceded by Johannes Steen; Johan Sverdrup	President of the Storting; 1886–1897	Succeeded by Viggo Ullmann; Carl C. Berner; Johannes Steen
