= Anton Christian Bang =

Norwegian bishop, writer and politician

Bishop of Oslo Anton Christian Bang
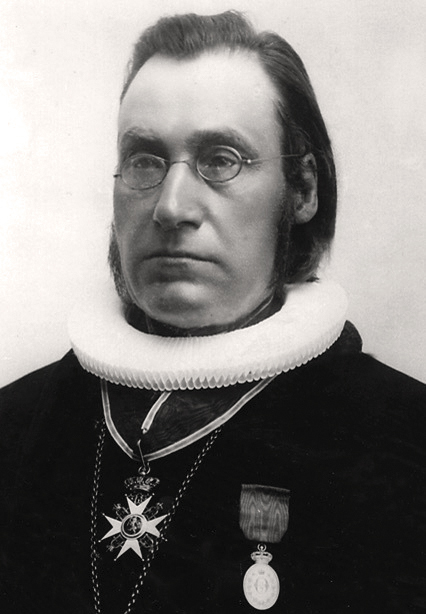
- Church: Church of Norway

Personal details
- Born: 18 September 1840 Dønna, Helgeland, Nordland, Sweden-Norway
- Died: 29 December 1913 (aged 73) Kristiania, Norway
- Occupation: Priest
- Education: Cand.theol.; University of Oslo

Anton Christian Bang

Minister of Education and Church Affairs
- In office 2 May 1893 – 27 April 1895
- Prime Minister: Emil Stang
- Preceded by: Carl Berner
- Succeeded by: Emil Stang

Anton Christian Bang (Norwegian pronunciation: [ˈɑ̂ntɔn ˈkrɪ̀stɪjɑn ˈbɑŋ]; 18 September 1840 in Dønna, Helgeland – 29 December 1913) was a Norwegian theologian, historian and politician for the Conservative Party of Norway. Bang was one of the more prominent figures within the Church of Norway in the decades around 1900. He served as a professor of church history at the Royal Frederick University from 1885 onward, as Minister of Education and Church Affairs from 1893 to 1895, and as Bishop of Oslo from 1896 to 1912.

== Biography ==
Bang was born on the island of Dønna, in Nordland county, to Ivar Christian Bang Andersen and Mariane Hansdatter Klæboe. As a youth he was involved in the Lofoten fishing season. He attended a teachers' school in Tromsø (1858–1960) and theology studies (1862–1867), and then served in ministries in Gran Municipality and Tromsø Municipality, and at the Gaustad asylum in Christiania. In 1876 he received the first doctorate in theology at the University of Oslo on the subject Om Kristi Opstandelses historiske Virkelighed (The Historical Reality of Christ's Resurrection).

Bang was a professor of church history (1885) and Bishop of Oslo (1896–1912). As the Bishop of Oslo and with his close ties to the royal house, he represented several national missions, including at the inauguration of the German Redemption Church in Jerusalem in 1898.

Bang was Minister of Education and Church Affairs from 1893 to 1895, and a member of the Council of State Division in Stockholm in 1895. Bang was appointed to the Second cabinet of Emil Stang in 1893.

As a researcher Bang was very productive and his writings cover a wide field. Bang wrote several major works in his career, including a notable biography on Hans Nielsen Hauge. The main contribution he made was as a collector of historical information, and he thus made an important contribution to religious folklore research. He was considered a conservative, both as a politician and as a theologian.

== Honors ==
- Commander of the 1st Class of the Order of St. Olav (1895)
- King Oscar II of Sweden award (1895)
- Petter Dass-medaljen from Nordlændingernes Forening in Oslo (1912)

== Selected works ==
- Juleevangeliet, på nynorsk (1868)
- Hans Nielsen Hauge og hans samtid. Et Tidsbillede fra omkring aar 1800 (1874)
- Kirken og Romerstaten indtil Constantin den store (1879)
- Vøluspaa og de sibyllinske Orakler (1879) Overview of the Historic Argument
- Julian den frafalne (1881)
- Udsigt over den norske kirkes historie efter reformationen (1883)
- Udsigt over den norske kirkes historie under katholicismen (1887)
- Kirkehistoriske Smaastykker (1890)
- Den norske kirkes historie i reformationsaarhundredet (1895)
- Den norske kirkes geistlighed i reformationsaarhundredet (1897)
- Norske hexeformularer og magiske opskrifter (1901–02)
- Erindringer, selvbiografi (1909)
- Den norske kirkes historie (1912)

Church of Norway titles
Preceded by Fredrik Wilhelm Klumpp Bugge	Bishop of Oslo; 1896–1912	Succeeded by Jens Frølich Tandberg
