= Vilhelm Andreas Wexelsen =

19th and 20th-century Norwegian bishop and politician

The Right Reverend Vilhelm Andreas Wexelsen
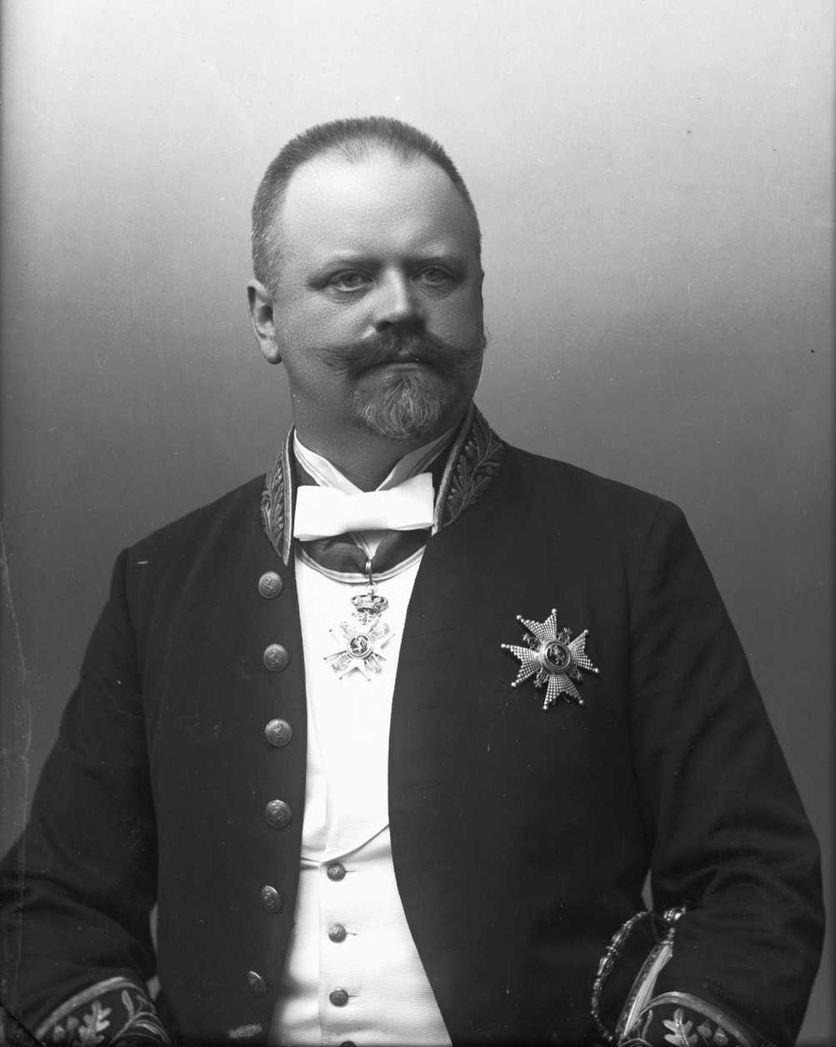
- Vilhelm Andreas Wexelsen, ca. 1890–1900
- Church: Church of Norway

Personal details
- Born: 5 June 1849 Klæbu Municipality, United Kingdoms of Sweden and Norway
- Died: 9 July 1909 (aged 60) Trondheim, Søndre Trondheim county, Norway
- Denomination: Christian
- Parents: Fredrik Nannestad Wexelsen; Inger Desideria Dessen
- Spouse: Anna Beata Nilssen (1874-1909)
- Occupation: Priest and Politician
- Education: cand.theol. (1872)
- Alma mater: Royal Frederick University

Vilhelm Andreas Wexelsen

Minister of Education and Church Affairs
- In office 17 February 1898 – 22 October 1903
- Prime Minister: Johannes Steen; Otto Blehr
- Preceded by: Jakob Sverdrup
- Succeeded by: Hans Nilsen Hauge
- In office 6 March 1891 – 15 July 1892
- Prime Minister: Johannes Steen
- Preceded by: Jacob A. Bonnevie
- Succeeded by: Carl Berner

Vilhelm Andreas Wexelsen (5 June 1849 – 9 July 1909) was a Norwegian bishop and politician for the Liberal Party. He served five terms in the Norwegian Parliament, was Minister of Education and Church Affairs from 1891 to 1892 and from 1898 to 1903 and bishop of Nidaros from 1905 to 1909.

Wexelsen graduated as cand.theol. from the Royal Frederick University in 1872. He was appointed vicar in Kolvereid Municipality in 1877 and was then vicar in Overhalla Municipality from 1884 to 1891. While stationed here he became involved in local politics, being mayor of Overhalla municipality from 1878 to 1884 and 1889 to 1891. Later, he was the regional school director from 1896 to 1898.

Wexelsen was elected to the Norwegian Parliament in 1883, representing the constituency of Nordre Trondhjems Amt. He had previously been a deputy representative during the term 1880–1882. He was then re-elected in 1883, 1886, and 1889.

On 6 March 1891, when the first cabinet Steen assumed office, Wexelsen was appointed Minister of Education and Church Affairs. He held this position until 1 July 1892, when he was moved to the Council of State Division in Stockholm. He lost this job on 1 May 1893, when the first cabinet Steen fell. Instead he was re-elected in 1895 for a fourth term in Parliament. He was re-elected for a fifth term in 1898, this time representing the constituency Trondhjem og Levanger, but on 17 February 1898 he returned as Minister of Education and Church Affairs as a part of the new second cabinet Steen. He retained this job when the second cabinet Steen was replaced by the first cabinet Blehr on 21 April 1902. However, when that cabinet fell on 21 October 1903, he left national politics.

In 1905, Wexelsen was appointed bishop of the Diocese of Nidaros. In 1906, he became historic when he carried out the coronation of the new King Haakon VII and Queen Maud, who had been named King and Queen following the dissolution of the union between Norway and Sweden and the Norwegian monarchy plebiscite in 1905. Wexelsen remained bishop until 1909, the year he died.

Wexelsen was the father of politician Einar Wexelsen. He was also father of entertainer Vidar Wexelsen, best known by his pen and stage name Per Kvist.

Political offices
Preceded by Jacob Aall Bonnevie	Norwegian Minister of Education and Church Affairs; 1891–1892	Succeeded by Carl Berner
Preceded by Jakob Sverdrup	Norwegian Minister of Education and Church Affairs; 1898–1903	Succeeded by Hans Nilsen Hauge
Church of Norway titles
Preceded by Johannes Nilssøn Skaar	Bishop of Trondhjem; 1905–1909	Succeeded by Peter W. K. Bøckman, Sr.
