= Georg August Thilesen =

Norwegian lawyer and elected official

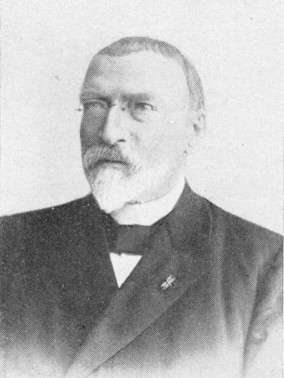
Georg August Thilesen.

Georg August Thilesen (20 December 1837 - 20 December 1917) was the Norwegian lawyer and elected official. He served as mayor of Drammen 1883–1884, Minister of the Interior 1888-1889 and 1898–1899, member of the Council of State Division in Stockholm 1899–1900, and Minister of Finance in 1900.
