= Ole Andreas Furu =

Norwegian politician (1841–1925)

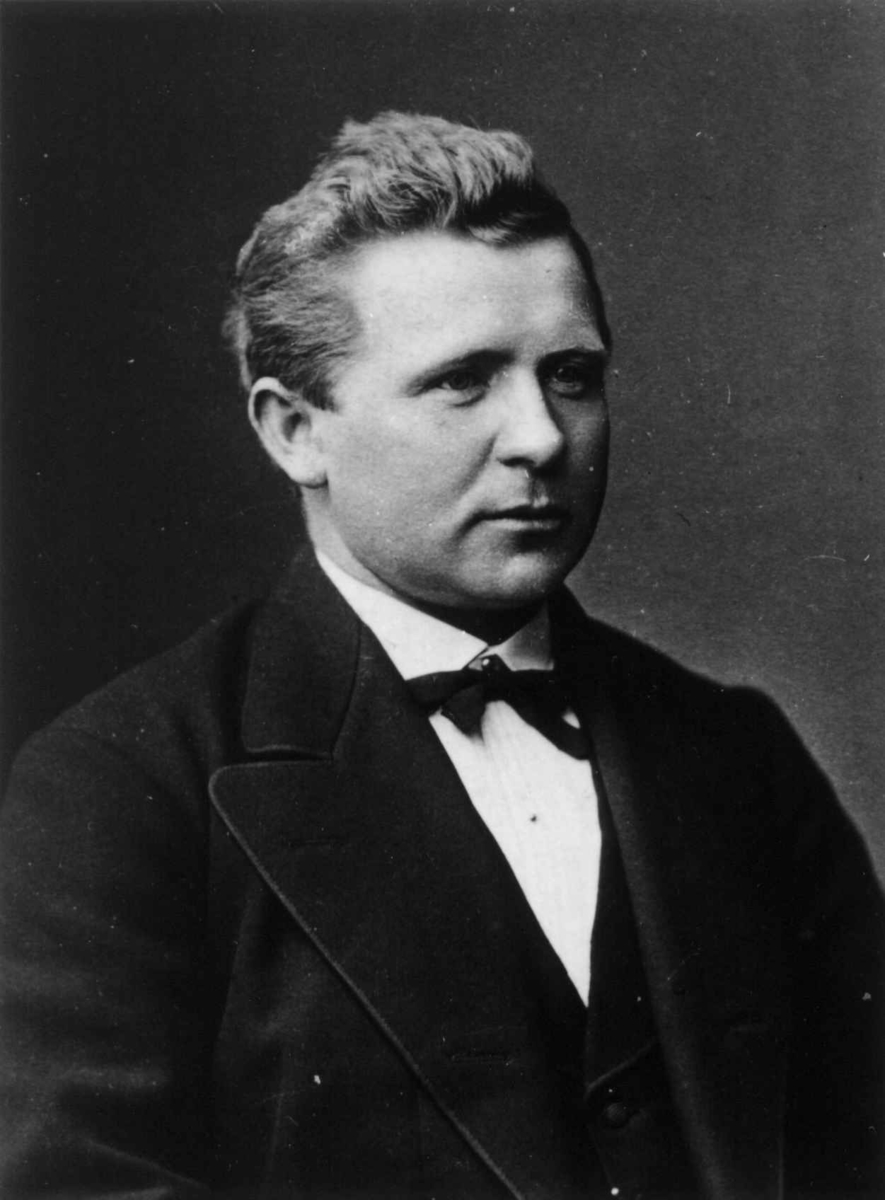
- Born: 26 December 1841; Trondheim, Norway
- Died: 28 November 1925 (aged 83)
- Occupations: lawyer, civil servant and politician
- Years active: 1880–1918
- Known for: member of Parliament of Norway, County Governor of Akershus
- Parents: Andreas Olsen Furu (father); Karen Olsdatter Lien (mother)

Ole Andreas Furu (26 December 1841 – 28 November 1925) was a Norwegian lawyer, civil servant and politician.

Furu was born in Trondheim, Norway, the son of Andreas Olsen Furu (1813–1887) and Karen Olsdatter Lien. He grew up on a farm in Sunndal Municipality and earned his law degree in 1867.

He was a member of the Parliament of Norway from 1880 to 1882 and from 1886 to 1888, representing the Conservative Party. He joined Stang's First Cabinet in 1890, first as member of the Council of State Division in Stockholm, later as Minister of the Interior. He was a member Stang's Second Cabinet, where he served as Minister of Auditing, and later Minister of Finance and Customs. He was County Governor of Akershus from 1895 to 1918.

Political offices
Preceded by Johan Henrik Paasche Thorne	Norwegian Minister of the Interior; 1890–1891	Succeeded by Wollert Konow
Preceded by Johannes Wilhelm Christian Steen	Norwegian Minister of Finance; 1893–1895	Succeeded by George Francis Hagerup
Civic offices
Preceded by Johan Christian Collett	County Governor of Akershus; 1895–1918	Succeeded by Hroar Olsen
