= Emil Stang =

5th Prime Minister of Norway

Emil Stang MP
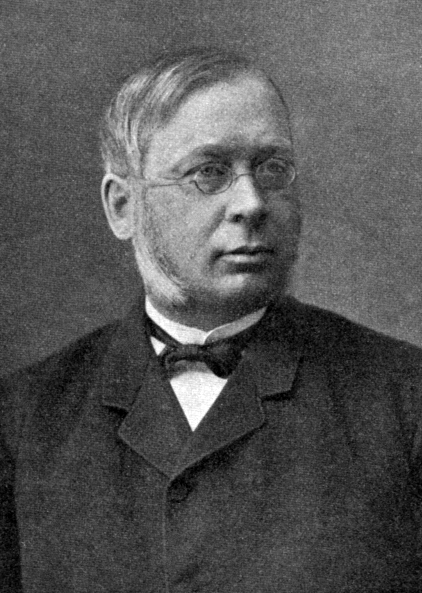
- Emil Stang

Prime Minister of Norway
- In office 2 May 1893 – 14 October 1895
- Monarch: Oscar II
- Preceded by: Johannes Steen
- Succeeded by: Francis Hagerup
- In office 13 July 1889 – 6 March 1891
- Monarch: Oscar II
- Preceded by: Johan Sverdrup
- Succeeded by: Johannes Steen

Minister of Education and Church Affairs
- In office 27 April 1895 – 14 October 1895
- Prime Minister: Himself
- Preceded by: Anton C. Bang
- Succeeded by: Jakob Sverdrup

Leader of the Conservative Party
- In office 1896–1899
- Preceded by: Christian H. Schweigaard
- Succeeded by: Francis Hagerup
- In office 1891–1893
- Preceded by: Christian H. Schweigaard
- Succeeded by: Christian H. Schweigaard
- In office 1884–1889
- Preceded by: Position established
- Succeeded by: Christian H. Schweigaard

Personal details
- Born: 14 June 1834 Christiania, United Kingdoms of Sweden and Norway
- Died: 4 July 1912 (aged 78) Christiania, Norway
- Party: Conservative
- Spouse: Adelaide Pauline Berg (m. 1865)
- Children: Emil jr Fredrik; Augusta
- Occupation: Politician
- Profession: Lawyer

Emil Stang (14 June 1834 – 4 July 1912) was a Norwegian jurist and politician. He served as the prime minister of Norway from 1889–1891 and again from 1893–1895. He also served as the first leader of the Conservative Party from 1884–1889, 1891–1893 and 1896–1899.

== Biography ==
Emil Stang was born and died in Christiania (now Oslo, Norway). He was the son of former Prime Minister Frederik Stang. Stang became cand.jur. in 1858 and established his own legal practice in 1861. Starting that year he also took part in the editing of Ugeblad for Lovkyndighed ("Weekly magazine for Law knowledge"). From 1871 to 1907 he was the editor of Norsk Retstidende (the annals of Norwegian courts), except for the years when he was Prime Minister.

He was the first chairman of the Conservative Party from 1884–1889, and lead the party again 1891–1893, and again 1896–1899. He was Prime Minister from 1889 to 1891 and from 1893 to 1895. From 1889 to 1891 he was President of the Storting. In 1891 he was appointed judge at Kristiania Stiftsoverrett, however, he never acceded this office. He became presiding judge (lagmann) for Borgarting and Agder regional courts in 1895 and Supreme Court Justice in 1901. He retired in 1904.

In 1890, Stang was appointed as a Knight Grand Cross of the Order of St. Olav. He was the father of Emil Stang and Fredrik Stang. He died in Christiania.

Political offices
Preceded by Wollert Konow, Sivert A. Nielsen, Johannes Steen	President of the Storting; 1889–1891	Succeeded by Viggo Ullmann, Sivert A. Nielsen
Preceded by Johan Sverdrup	Prime Minister of Norway; 1889–1891	Succeeded by Johannes Steen
Preceded by Johannes Steen	Prime Minister of Norway; 1893–1895	Succeeded by George Francis Hagerup
