= Bjørn Skogstad Aamo =

Norwegian economist and politician (1946–2023)

- Born: 21 January 1946; Oslo, Norway
- Died: 24 December 2023 (aged 77)

Bjørn Skogstad Aamo (21 January 1946 – 24 December 2023) was a Norwegian economist and politician for the Labour Party. He was State Secretary for three non-consecutive terms between 1973 and 1993, and served as Director of the Financial Supervisory Authority of Norway from 1993 to 2011.

== Career ==
=== Political career ===
Born in Oslo, Skogstad Aamo grew up in Mandal in Southern Norway. He became involved in politics at an early age, and was appointed chairman of the local Workers' Youth League chapter in 1962. He then moved back to the capital to enroll at the University of Oslo. He became chairman of the Workers' Youth League chapter there. Situated on the left wing of the organization, he became a vocal opponent of the Vietnam War as well as the Norwegian North Atlantic Treaty Organization membership, much to the dismay of party secretary Haakon Lie. However, Skogstad Aamo found support from fellow economist Per Kleppe, at that time a deputy member of the party central committee and head of the think tank Arbeiderbevegelsens utredningskontor.

Skogstad Aamo graduated with the degree cand.oecon. in economics in 1970, and from 1971 to 1972 he worked as personal secretary (today known as political adviser) in the Ministry of Local Government and Labour. He was then promoted to State Secretary in the Ministry of Finance from 1973 to 1979, serving under Per Kleppe who had become Minister of Finance.

Skogstad Aamo was then head of the department of economics in the European Free Trade Association from 1979 to 1981, and director of the Regional Development Fund from 1981 to 1986. He then returned as State Secretary from 1986 to 1989 under Minister of Finance Gunnar Berge in Brundtland's Second Cabinet. He lost his job when Brundtland's Second Cabinet fell in 1989, and briefly returned to Regional Development Fund. In 1990 as the short-lived Syse's Cabinet fell and Brundtland's Third Cabinet assumed office, Skogstad Aamo was appointed State Secretary at the Office of the Prime Minister.

=== Financial Supervisory Authority ===
In 1993 Skogstad Aamo was appointed Director of the Financial Supervisory Authority, succeeding Svein Aasmundstad. This decision was criticized by the political opposition. He belonged to the same political party as Minister of Finance Sigbjørn Johnsen and the rest of Brundtland's Third Cabinet. Since Skogstad Aamo came directly from a government position, that of state secretary, parliament member Lars Gunnar Lie cited concern about a perceived lack of distance between the third cabinet Brundtland and the Financial Supervisory Authority. This would put the independence of the latter at odds, he claimed. However, most of the criticism was directed at Sigbjørn Johnsen, who at that time was under scrutiny for his involvement with private corporation UNI Storebrand. The Financial Supervisory Authority would have a role in this scrutiny, and several people, including parliament member Kristin Halvorsen, asked for the appointment of Johnsen's party fellow be postponed until after the case was closed. Parliament member Carl I. Hagen called for Johnsen to resign. On the other hand, conservative newspaper Aftenposten defended the decision in an op-ed the next day, citing Skogstad Aamo's strong qualifications for the job. The criticism did not hinder the appointment of Skogstad Aamo, and Sigbjørn Johnsen remained in his seat.

Skogstad Aamo applied for the position as Governor of the Central Bank of Norway in 1999, but Svein Gjedrem was appointed.

During the 2008 financial crisis, Skogstad Aamo stated that banks are safer in Norway than in any other country. The matters are complicated by Norway's close relations to Iceland, whose national crisis had consequences for Norwegian customers in the banks Glitnir and Kaupthing. Skogstad Aamo was himself a board member of the Norwegian Banks' Guarantee Fund.

== Personal life and death ==
Skogstad Aamo was married to Eldrid Nordbø, a former government minister. He died on 24 December 2023, at the age of 77.

Preceded by Svein Aasmundstad	Director of the Financial Supervisory Authority of Norway; 1993–2011	Succeeded by Morten Baltzersen
