= Oslo Airport location controversy =

Long-running debate in Norway

Coordinates: 60°11′51″N 11°06′00″E

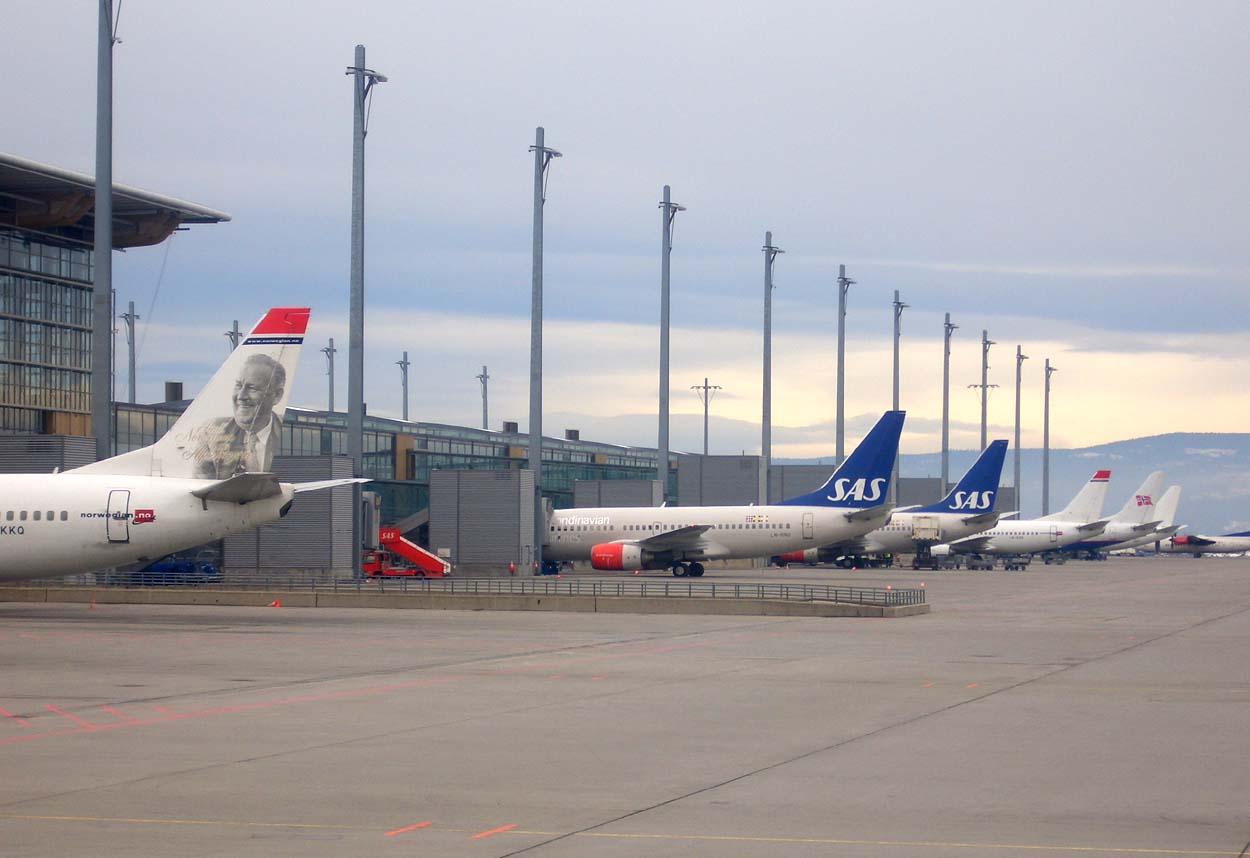
Oslo Airport, Gardermoen has been the main airport serving Oslo since 1998

The location of the main airport serving the city of Oslo, Norway, has been the subject of several political debates since 1918. The first controversy was initially related to choice between the islands of Gressholmen and Lindøya in the Oslofjord for a water aerodrome. The debate later changed, arriving at the decision in 1933, to locate a new airport at Fornebu. However, Oslo Airport, Fornebu, being located on a peninsula, proved to not have sufficient space for a runway capable of intercontinental aircraft and a second runway, resulting in plans from the 1960s to replace it. The main contestants were Gardermoen Air Station in Ullensaker Municipality, Hurum Municipality, Hobøl Municipality, Ås Municipality and a split solution between Fornebu and Gardermoen. In 1992, parliament decided to build an all-new Oslo Airport, Gardermoen; when it opened in 1998, Fornebu was closed. The decision caused the southern parts of Eastern Norway to be moved further from the main airport, and the regional, privately owned Sandefjord Airport, Torp became the base for low-cost airlines. Moss Airport, Rygge opened in 2007, becoming the third simultaneous airport to serve Oslo, and closed in 2016.

== First controversy ==
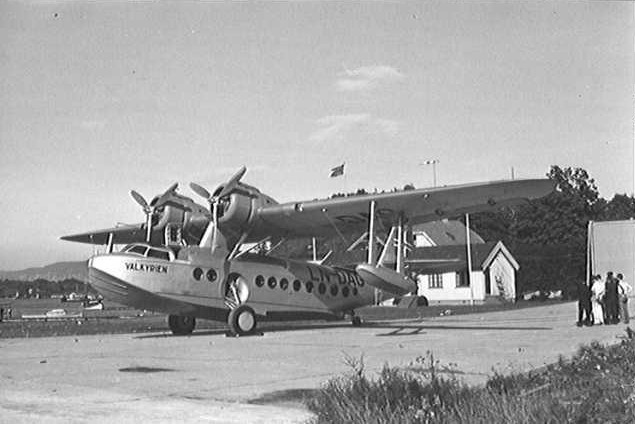
Sikorsky S-43 at Gressholmen Airport in 1936

Aviation in Oslo started in 1909, when Carl Gustav Cederström of Sweden had a flight show based at the fields at Etterstad. Following this, the Norwegian Army decided that it needed a military land airport, and established itself at Kjeller, outside Oslo, in 1912. Kjeller Airport served as the main airport for Norway until the 1930s, being the main base of the newly established Norwegian Army Air Service and the first place to have air services.

In 1918, the first Norwegian airline, Det Norske Luftfartsrederi, was established, and plans were made to start flying to Trondheim. The following year, civil aviation was for the first time discussed in the Norwegian Parliament. Norsk Luftfartsrederi wanted to start sea plane routes from Oslo, and applied to the state to be allowed to lease 2 hectares (4.9 acres) the island Lindøya for 99 years. The Oslo Port Authority recommended that the application be denied, since it would interfere with ship traffic and they were already negotiations with the state to purchase the island. The ministry recommended a ten-year lease. Sam Eyde, who was a member of parliament, recommended that the state should be responsible for all airports, and suggested a state-owned seaplane airport at Gressholmen. But no money was granted for construction of the airport until 1926, when Gressholmen Airport opened. Gressholmen was served by Norsk Luftfartsrederi and Deutsche Luft Hansa.

During the late 1920s and early 1930s, the politicians became less satisfied with the solution. Kjeller was considered too far away from the city center (about 20 kilometres (12 mi), but along the mainline railway), while transport to Gressholmen needed to be done by ferry. The politicians also wanted to have a combined land- and seaplane airport, and it had become clear that planes serving Gressholmen were interfering with ship traffic. A committee was established to look into the matter. While considering many locations, it made detail surveys of only two places: Ekeberg, located south-east of the city center, and Fornebu, to the south-west.

== Second controversy ==
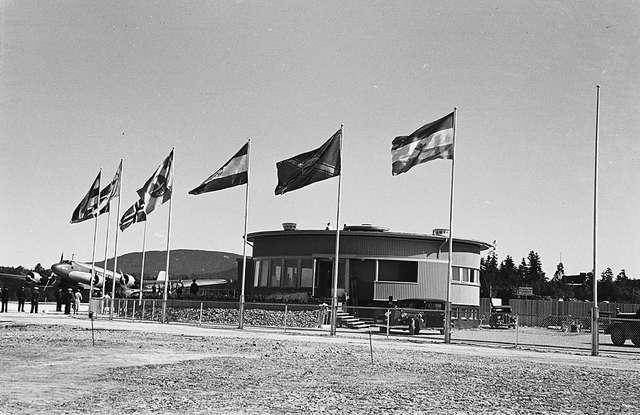
Oslo Airport, Fornebu on opening day, 1 June 1939

The first proposals to use Gardermoen as a new main airport was launched by the local newspaper Romerikes Blad in 1946, who argued that Fornebu would cost too much to expand. Gardermoen also had access to the railway. Also Ludvig G. Braathen, founder of Braathens SAFE, was an early proponent of having Gardermoen as a main airport. His company had its technical base at Gardermoen from it was founded in 1946 until 1948, but had to move due to the cold climate. During the 1940s, Fornebu was regularity troubled with fog, and Gardermoen became the default reserve airport for Oslo.

From 1946 to 1951, all transatlantic flights were flown from Gardermoen, which was also used by a limited number of European airlines. In 1950, the Ministry of Transport and Communications (Norway) launched a report which discussed the possibility of making Gardermoen an international airport. While construction at Gardermoen would be cheaper and allow more expansion, the distance from Oslo was a hindrance. It recommended that intercontinental flights could use Gardermoen, while domestic and European flights use Fornebu. However, from 1952, all traffic was transferred to Fornebu.

The first scheduled jet services to Norway were introduced by British European Airways in 1960, when their service from Stockholm via Oslo to London started using deHavilland Comets. The following year, SAS started their route from Gardermoen to New York, but it was soon terminated. In 1962, the runway at Fornebu was extended to 2,200 metres (7,200 ft) and two years later a new terminal opened. This allowed jet aircraft to use the airport, and SAS started Copenhagen and Bodø flights using Sud Aviation Caravelles.

On 12 June 1970, the Tufte-Johansen Committee launched a proposal to build a new main airport for Oslo at one of five locations: Gardermoen, Hurum Municipality, Askim Municipality, Nesodden Municipality or Ås Municipality. This was based on surveys of seventeen locations. A new main airport was planned to have three parallel runways. The second part of their report was launched on 7 June 1971, when the Lund Committee suggested building an airport at Hobøl, with a minority wanting it to be located at Ås; Gardermoen was proposed as the third-best solution. In 1972, all charter flights, except those operated by SAS and Braathens SAFE, were transferred from Fornebu to Gardermoen. An old hangar was rebuilt to become a terminal building, and the Norwegian Civil Aviation Administration moved its administration to Gardermoen. The airport also had general aviation, and was training base for the main airlines.

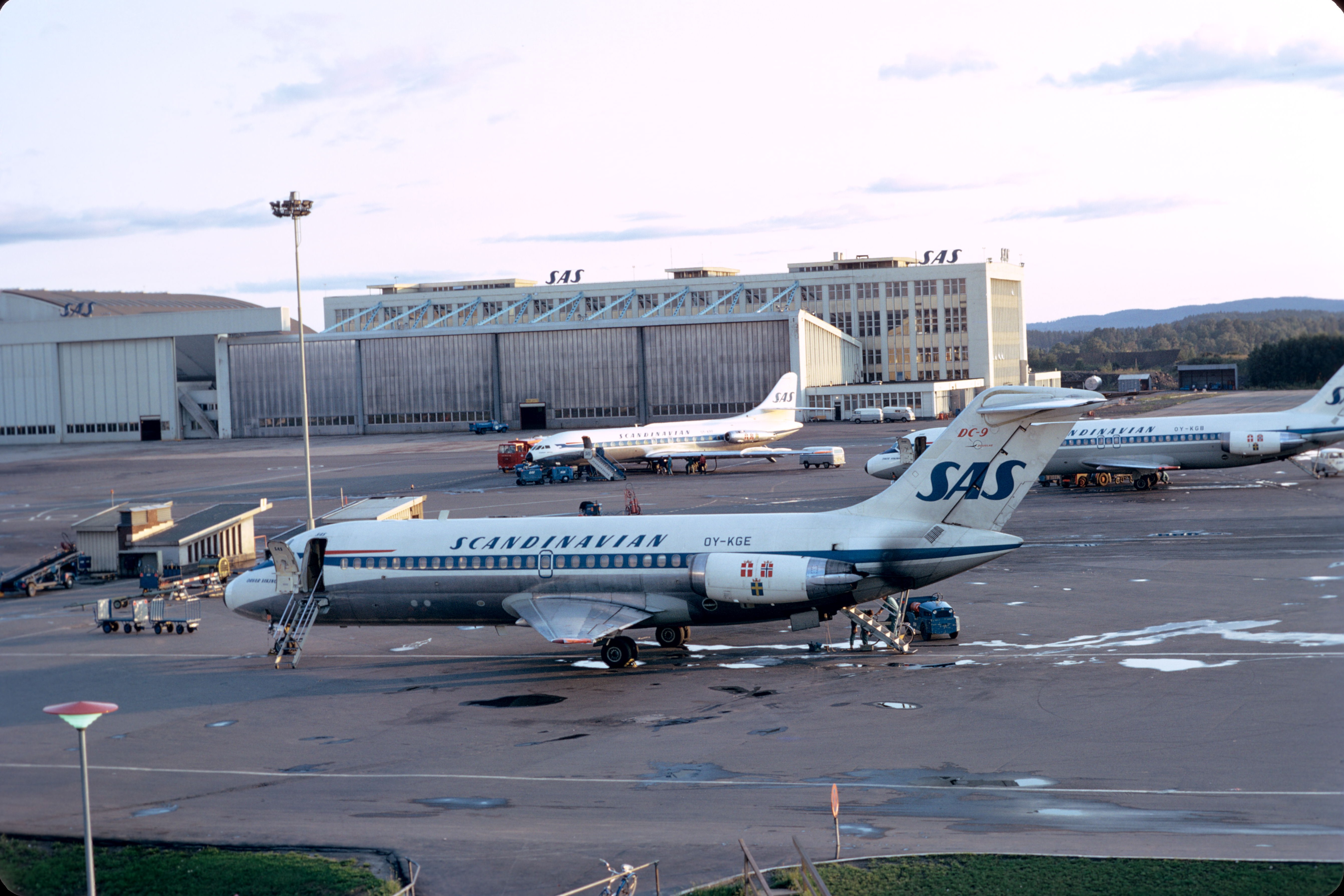
Three Scandinavian Airlines aircraft at Fornebu in 1972; in the foreground a DC-9-20, a DC-9-40 with a Sud Aviation Caravelle furthest away.

During the 1970s, regional politics became a major issue for the choice of a new airport, with the political goal to move jobs and residential areas out of central Oslo. In 1973, Minister of Regional Affairs Oddvar Norli from the Labour Party and Hedmark wanted the airport to be located at Mjøsa and felt that the investments to build at Hobøl would be too centralized. Following the 1973 energy crisis, aviation was in decline, and the issue became less important for politicians. Parliament looked into the localization in 1973, but decided that Fornebu should be kept for scheduled traffic, while Gardermoen should be used for charter flights. This was keyed the "divided solution", and was deemed sufficient to meet all needs in the foreseeable future. However, the politicians wanted to secure a suitable area for a new three-runway airport at Hobøl. Parliament therefore passed legislation that reserved the necessary area.

In 1973, the estimates for traffic at a main airport at Hobøl in 2000 was 16 million passengers. Estimates for Gardermoen as a supplement to Fornebu were at most estimated to 14 million passengers in 1993. Estimates from the 1970s for traffic in 2000 varied from 5 to 24 million, and were made at a time when passenger numbers were at 2 million. The high estimates were therefore not taken seriously among politicians and the media. In 1980, the government made a report where they recommended that the divided solution remain, and that Fornebu be expanded. During the 1980s, a new, multi-story parking house was built, and the terminal expanded a third story and with three satellites, one for SAS, one for Braathens SAFE and one for international flights. The international section also received bridges to the airlines.

With the large increase of air traffic during the 1980s, politicians began to realize that a new main airport would have to be opened some time during the 1990s, or more traffic be moved to Gardermoen. When Johan J. Jacobsen from the Centre Party was appointed minister of transport in 1983, he tried to change the situation so the divided solution would remain permanent. He wanted the traffic at Fornebu to have a regulated peak of 5.5 million passengers per year. He also proposed that all international traffic be transferred to Gardermoen in 1988 and a new terminal be built to handle 3.5 million passengers annually. This was supported by parliament on 10 May 1984. Due to this, the areas at Hobøl were freed up.

=== Hurum selected ===
In 1984, after many years of stable air traffic ridership, numbers increased in 1984, and the debate took off again. Because the areas for an airport in Hobøl was just freed up, it was considered politically impossible to regulate them again, since it would be considered a restriction on local democracy. The proposal to build at Hurum was launched again, and this time new explosive techniques would make Hurum much cheaper. The Civil Airport Administration launched a report in 1986, and recommended Hurum as the best location. The Ministry of Transport instead wanted to expand the existing runway at Fornebu, and build a second, parallel one. However, this would create much noise pollution, and although the cheapest solution, was politically impossible.

Most of the right-winged parties and commercial interests had Hurum as their preferred location. This was due to the large increase of commerce and population around the Oslo Fjord, and that this should be stimulated rather than discouraged. The Labor Party wanted to have an airport at Gardermoen, and stated that this would give a better balance in investments throughout Eastern Norway, and eliminate some of the commuting from Oppland and Hedmark to Oslo and Akershus. The domestic airlines all wanted to have an airport south and west of Oslo (i.e. either Hobøl or Hurum) which would be closest to the population centers. They also stated that the worst possible solution would be to keep two airports, which would split the company's hubs in two.

In 1986, the Labour Party was reinstated in government, and Kjell Borgen from Hedmark was appointed minister of transport. He launched a report to parliament on 8 May 1986 that recommended building a new airport at Gardermoen. The report had both administrative and political deficiencies, and was rejected by parliament, in part due to a lack of covering the needs of the Air Force. The political debate soon proved to split most of the parties, with politicians focusing on geography rather than ideology. Proponents of Hurum stated that the government was making regional politics way heavier than commercial and transporteconomical needs. Meteorological surveys showed bad weather conditions at Hurum, while geological surveys showed poor ground conditions at Gardermoen.

Borgen made a proposal in parliament to build a new airport at Gardermoen. On 8 June 1988, parliament instead voted to build a new airport at Hurum. Fourteen members of the Labor Party voted against their own minister, the first time members of the party had voted against a proposal from their own government. The lack of party loyalty may have been aggravated the day before, when the government had to withdraw a proposal to make all limousines for the members of government permitted to use bus lanes and equip them with emergency lights. On the day of the airport voting, it was ahead of time clear that some Labor Party members would vote against Gardermoen, but that the number was not known to anyone. Members from the Conservative and Christian Democratic Party, who were in favor of a Hurum location, encouraged each Labor Party member who was in favor of Hurum to make a public statement. By the time the Labor Partys parliamentary leader Einar Førde started having an individual meeting with each of the dissidents, it was too late to change their minds. Parliament voted with 81 against 76 votes to build at Hurum. Borgen quit his position on 13 June.

=== Weather conditions ===
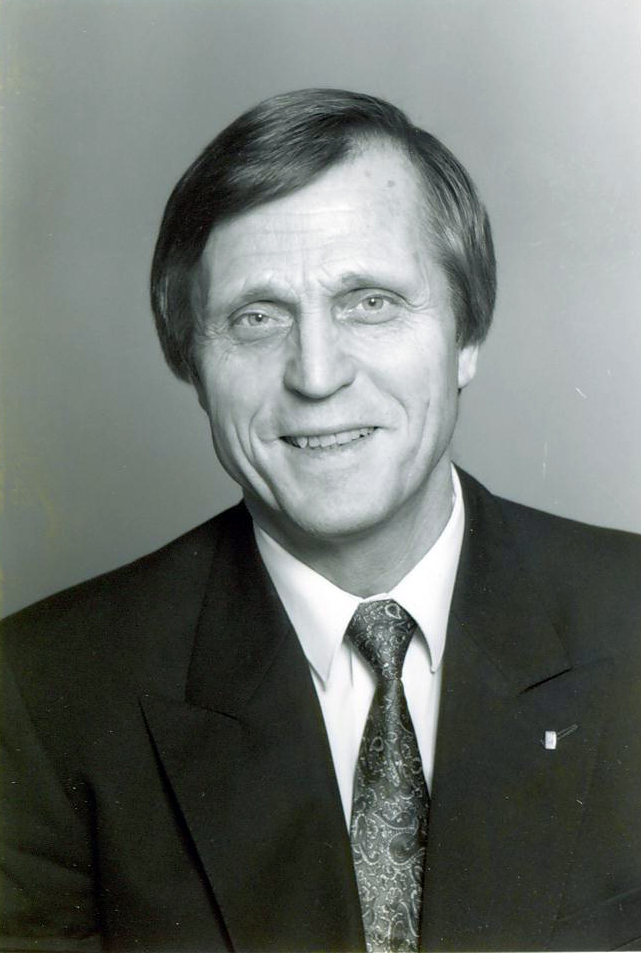
William Engseth

Borgen's successor, William Engseth, started the planning of a new airport at Hurum. New meteorological surveys launched in 1989 again stated that Hurum was not suited as a site for the airport. This was because of low clouds combined with heavy side wind. But it soon became clear that there were disagreements within the Norwegian Meteorological Service (DNMI), and pilots from SAS and Braathens SAFE stated that the reports had created artificial problems and they were not believable.

A state committee, led by Ole-Anders Hafsnor, director in Det Norske Veritas, and committee members representing SAS, Braathens SAFE, the Swedish Civil Aviation Administration and the DNMI looked into the meteorological findings, without finding anything wrong. The committee was criticized for having the leader of the organization which was to be controlled, in it. The Hafsnor report was presented in 1990. The report was criticized by the trade unions representing the pilots and air controllers, who both stated that the reports from DNMI did not give any finding that would make Hurum unsuitable for an airport. An independent report was launched by Jan Wiborg, which stated that the surveys had been manipulated. The ministry then appointed a new committee with members from the University of Trondheim, Rakel Surlien, Erik Jersin and Aage J. Thunem, to look into the findings. After the process was finished, it turned out that DNMI did not claim authorship to the weather data used in the final report from the Ministry of Transport, and that these had been compiled by the ministry from various sources.

Following the findings that Hurum was unsuitable, both of the two large airlines felt that they needed to pressure politicians to not end up with a divided solution. In addition to the fear of a divided hub, the two incumbents knew that the domestic airline industry would be liberalized in the 1990s, and any airline could fly any route. This would require additional capacity at Oslo Airport. Top management in SAS, Braathens SAFE and Widerøe decided that they would all support a Gardermoen alternative fully. In 1990, the government, with Minister of Transport Lars Gunnar Lie from the Christian Democratic Party, proposed having a new round of committees and evaluation to decide between the divided solution and a new airport at Gardermoen. But in parliament, the Labor and Conservative parties, who held a majority, voted to only consider Gardermoen as an alternative.

=== Final decision ===
When the decision was to be finalized in parliament on 8 October 1992, there was a majority, consisting of the Labor and Conservative parties, that wanted a new main airport. The Labor Party wanted Gardermoen, while the Conservative Party wanted it to be located at Hobøl. The Center Party and Christian Democratic Party wanted to continue with the divided solution, since they were principally opposed to investments that would give growth opportunities in Eastern Norway. The Socialist Left Party (SV) was concerned about how they could reduce the amount of air traffic, because of its pollution and energy inefficiency. Instead, SV wanted to build high-speed railways. The Progress Party was indifferent to the location, but stated that if a new airport should be built, it should be built, owned and operate by the private sector.

The uncertainty before the voting was related to if the Labor Party and the Conservative Party could reach agreement. They had no prior agreement, but the Conservative Party's primary wish was to get a majority to support a two-year delay to make a new consideration of the Hobøl-alternative. It turned out that the order of voting would become critical; the Conservative Party wanted to first have a vote about a delay, and then about whether to build at Gardermoen or not. This would force the Christian Democrats and the Center Party to vote for the delay (which would then have a majority) and then only the Labor Party would in the end vote for Gardermoen. To counteract this, the Labour Party made a secret, two-point agreement with the Christian Democratic and Center parties the night before the vote. All three parties, who had a majority in parliament, would vote against the Hobøl-proposal from the Conservatives. In exchange, the Christian Democratic Party was to support the construction of the Gardermoen Line, a high-speed railway which would connect Oslo Central Station to Gardermoen in 19 minutes. If the Gardermoen proposal was rejected, the Labor Party obliged to vote in favor of a divided solution. Both Johan J. Jacobsen of the Centre Party and Kjell Magne Bondevik of the Christian Democratic Party felt that this agreement would create a majority for a divided solution, since they were confident that the Conservatives would stick to their support of Hobøl.

On the other hand, the Conservative Party had a group meeting prior to the debate where they agreed that the importance of building a new main airport was more important that where it was located. The group decided that they would discard the delay-suggestion for Hobøl and instead support Gardermoen. To keep this strategy tight, they decided to not notify the Center Party and the Christian Democratic Party. The vote ended with the Labor Party and the Conservative Party voting in favor of Gardermoen, with the proposal to vote for a delay never being made.

== Alternatives ==
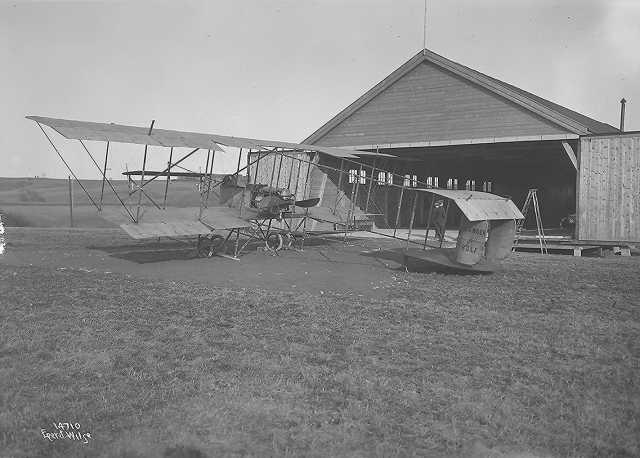
Kjeller Airport and a Farman MF.7 in 1913

=== Kjeller ===
Kjeller Airport was founded in 1912 as a military air station, and was considered as the main airport prior to the choice of Fornebu. It is located in Skedsmo, about northeast 20 kilometres (12 mi) from Oslo. It has since been converted into a general aviation airport.

=== Gressholmen ===
Gressholmen Airport was founded in 1926 and was only used for seaplanes. It was located on an island, so all passengers had to use a ferry. However, it was very close to the city center, being only a few kilometers away. It was discontinued after the 1938 season.

=== Gardermoen ===
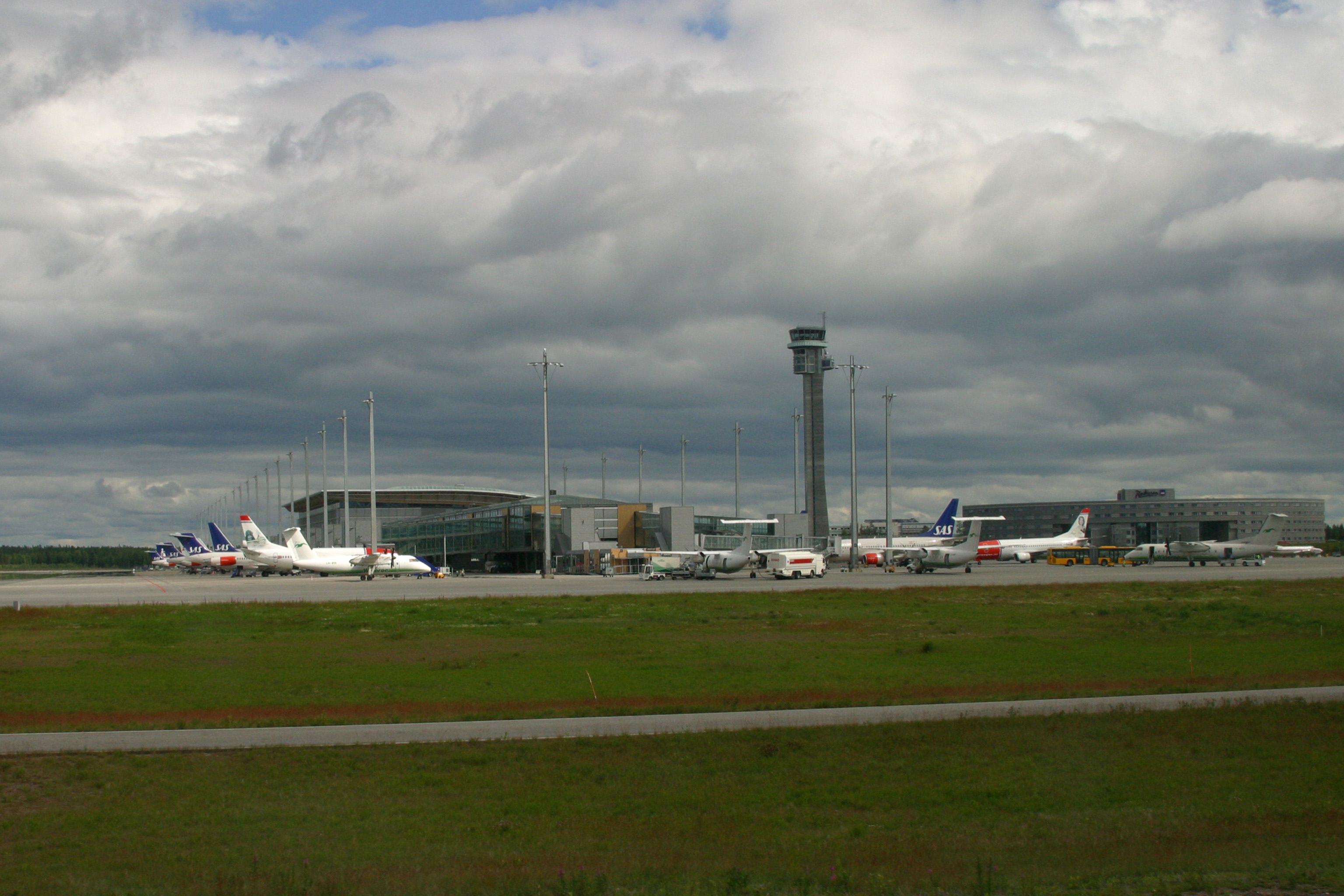
Domestic concourse at Oslo Airport, Gardermoen

Gardermoen was first an army base, equipped with a landing field in 1912, then an Air Force base mostly using Junkers Ju 52s. The airport was taken over by the German Luftwaffe in 1940 during the occupation of Norway by Nazi Germany. During World War II, the German forces built two runways and hangar facilities. In 1945, the airport was returned to the Norwegian Air Force. There was a limited number of international flights from 1946, and from 1972, most charter flights were transferred to Gardermoen.

Gardermoen is about 50 kilometres (31 mi) north of Oslo, and was connected to the railway network with the Hauerseter–Gardermoen Line. Of all the proposed locations, it has the furthest average distance from the mean population in Eastern Norway. It was the preferred solution for the Labor Party, who wanted to move the population concentration north of Oslo. Two thousand people would be affected by noise pollution.

=== Fornebu ===
Fornebu had been the main airport for Oslo since 1939. It was limited by a 2,370 metres (7,780 ft) runway and a small terminal. To meet future demand, the runway would have to be expanded to about 3,000 metres (9,800 ft) and a second, parallel runway built as well.

The proposal had lower costs than building a new main airport, and was supported by the Ministry of Transport. Although issues would have arisen with a population of over 60k people underneath the airport's flight path, this project had benefits of being conveniently located close to the city centre meaning that the airport would have been within the catchment area of many businesses, similar to Kai Tak Airport that closed in July the same year that Fornebu Airport closed.

=== Fornebu and Gardermoen ===
A divided solution with both Fornebu and Gardermoen was the de facto solution in use between 1972 and 1998. It involved that Fornebu would have a limit on capacity, and that first charter flights, then all international flights, would be transferred to Gardermoen. This would be the cheapest solution, and would allow Fornebu to remain a local airport for Oslo.

The divided solution was preferred by the Center and Christian Democratic Party, who both wanted to minimize public investments in Eastern Norway, and the Socialist Left Party, who wanted to limit the growth in aviation. The divided solution was seen as the least preferable by the airlines, who would have to operate two bases, and eventually would have to offer ground transport for transfer passengers between the two airports, located about 60 kilometres (37 mi) apart.

=== Hurum ===
A local action committee against airports in Hurum was formed already in 1970.

== Aftermath ==
Oslo Airport, Gardermoen opened on 8 October 1998.

=== Competition ===
The strategic consequences of the new main airport, combined with the deregulation of the airline market, had a disruptive and lasting effect on the incumbent airlines. Following deregulation in 1994, there were not sufficient take-off and landing slots at Fornebu during the morning and afternoon rush hours to allow a new company to compete with Braathens SAFE and SAS. While the number of destinations served by both airlines increased from two to six, there was no price war and both companies continued to make a profit.

The opening of Gardermoen had strategic impact on aviation in Norway. Despite the deregulation of the market in 1994, the lack of free slots at Fornebu made it impossible to have free competition, since no new airlines could establish themselves and no new international airlines could fly to Fornebu. Gardermoen allowed this to happen, and from 1 August 1998, Color Air started with flights from Oslo, pressing down prices on domestic routes. Although Color Air went bankrupt the following year, the losses for Braathens were so high that they were taken over by SAS. The gap was then filled by Norwegian Air Shuttle.

=== Torp and Rygge ===
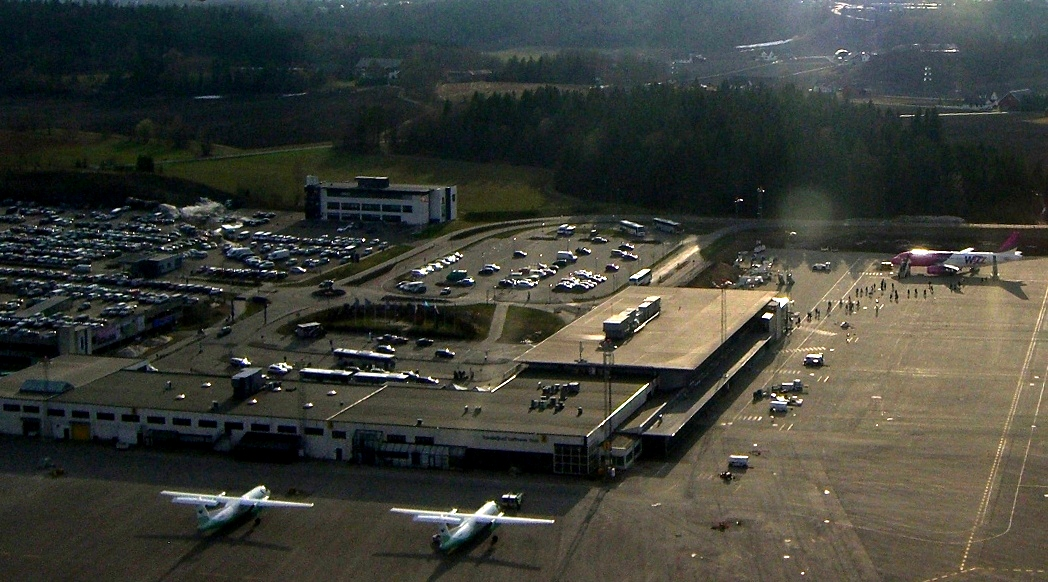
Sandefjord Airport, Torp has become a secondary airport serving Oslo by low-cost carriers such as Ryanair and Wizz Air.

On 1 April 1997, the European aviation market was fully deregulated, and concession was no longer needed to fly internationally between countries within the European Economic Area. The Irish low-cost airline Ryanair established a route from London Stansted Airport to Sandefjord Airport, Torp, located in Vestfold, 110 kilometres (68 mi) from Oslo. The branding of Torp as Oslo caused a heated discussion between the Civil Aviation Administration, after the International Air Transport Association in 1998 placed Sandefjord Airport under the area code for Oslo, despite being 118 km from Oslo and lacking high-speed rail transport.

== Criticism ==
The location at Gardermoen was met with considerable objections. Some focused on the long distance to Oslo and the need of a costly high-speed railway. Other concerns were the environmental impact on the area (a large ground water basin was discovered underneath the site), and claims that bad weather would cause problems.

=== Questioning of weather surveys ===
The weather surveys, which recommended the new airport be built at Gardermoen in place of Hurum, were questioned by civil engineer Jan Fredrik Wiborg, who was commissioned by the parliament to review the findings of the Norwegian Meteorological Institute. He claimed the reports had numerous technical failings, that some of the data may have been intentionally falsified, and consequently that parliament had been deliberately misled by government officials. Wiborg died on 21 June 1994 after falling from a hotel window in Copenhagen, and crucial documents about the case disappeared. As Danish police concluded his death was a suicide, no criminal investigation took place. Circumstances surrounding his death were never fully explained, however, and in 1999 journalists from the newspaper Aftenposten were awarded the prestigious SKUP prize for their investigation of the case. During 2000, the Parliamentary Standing Committee on Scrutiny and Constitutional Affairs held a public hearing about the alleged foul play during the airport planning process. An official report was released in 2001.

=== Fog and deicing problems ===
Since its opening, Gardermoen has had considerable problems with fog and freezing rain, causing complete close-down a few times. It is hard to avoid fog in Norway, and the old airport Fornebu and the alternative airport location Hurum also has fog (at least as much since these two places are near the sea shore, which Gardermoen is not). Gardermoen is reported to have more problems with supercooled rain, which reportedly occurs on average three times a month during winter on Gardermoen, according to meteorological stats gathered since the 1950s. The use of deicing fluids is restricted since the area underneath the airport contains one of the nation's largest uncontained quaternary aquifers (underground water systems), the Trandum delta. In January 2006 an Infratek deicing system was set up, using infrared heat in large hangar tents. It was hoped that the method would decrease the use of chemical deicers by 90%, but as of February 2007 the technique was still unsuccessful.

In the morning of 14 December 1998, a combination of freezing fog and supercooled rain caused severe glaze at Gardermoen. At least 20 aircraft engines were damaged by ice during take-off, and five aircraft needed to make precautionary landings with only one working engine. A similar incident took place in Denver International Airport on 31 October 2002.
