= Minister of Transport of Norway =

Norwegian cabinet position

- Samferdselsministeren

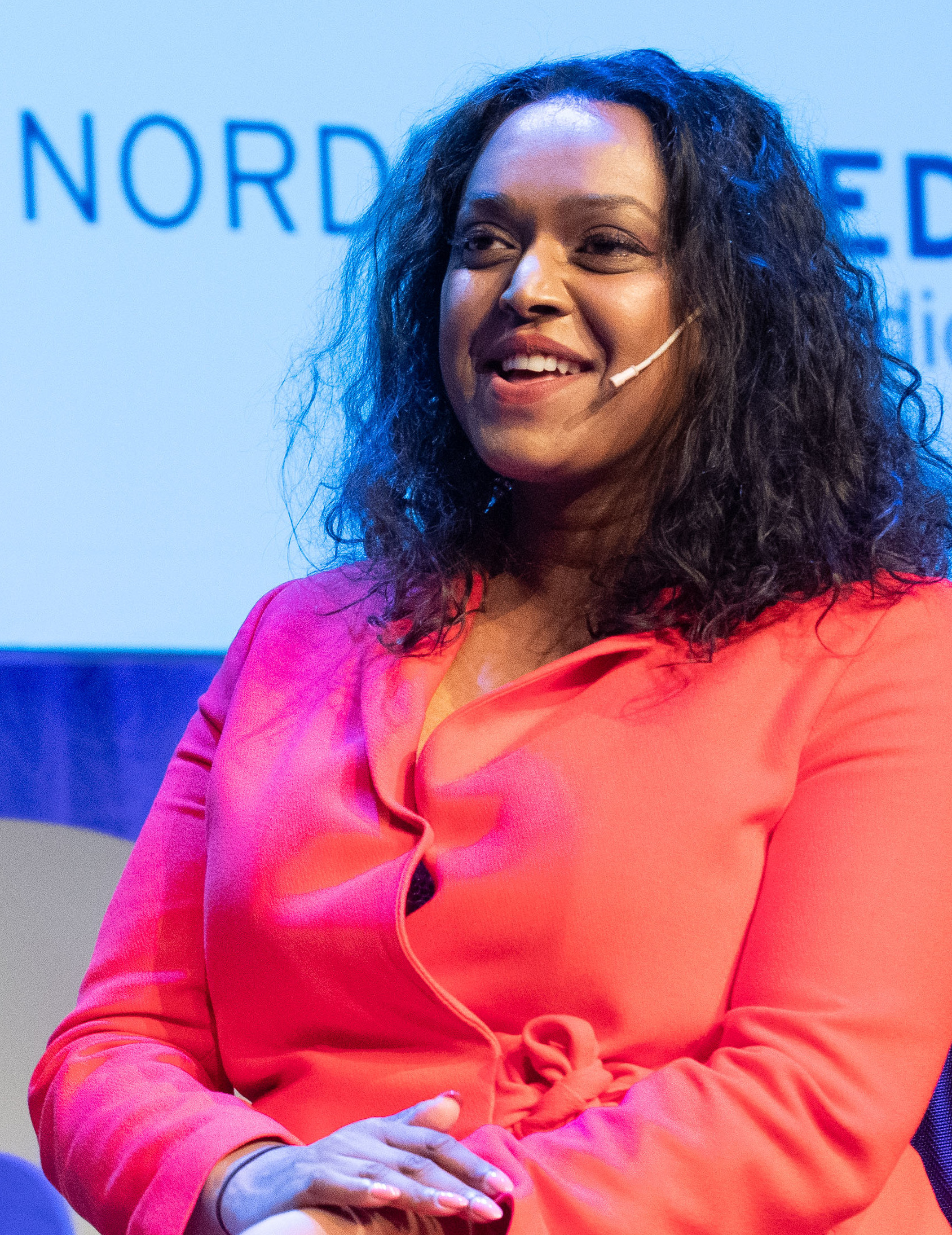
- Incumbent; Kamzy Gunaratnam since 11 September 2026
- Ministry of Transport
- Member of: Council of State
- Seat: Oslo
- Nominator: Prime Minister
- Appointer: Monarch; with approval of Parliament
- Term length: No fixed length
- Constituting instrument: Constitution of Norway
- Precursor: Minister of the Interior
- Formation: 22 February 1946
- First holder: Nils Langhelle
- Deputy: State secretaries at the Ministry of Transport
- Website: Official website

The Minister of Transport (Norwegian: Samferdelsministeren) is a Councillor of State and Chief of the Norwegian Ministry of Transport. The post has been held by Kamzy Gunaratnam of the Labour Party since 2026. The ministry is responsible for policy and public operations within postal services, telecommunications, civil aviation, public roads, rail transport, and public transport, including ferry services that are part of national roads and coastal transport infrastructure. The ministry has seven agencies and four limited companies, including the airport operator Avinor, railway operator Vy, the Norwegian National Rail Administration, the Norwegian Public Roads Administration, and Norway Post. There are also inspectorates and authorities related to accident investigation, civil aviation, and railways.

The position was created with the ministry on 22 February 1946, when Nils Langhelle (Labour) was appointed. The ministry and minister positions were split out from the Ministry of Labour. Twenty-eight people have held the position, representing six parties. Sixteen people have represented the Labour Party, five for the Centre Party, two for the Christian Democratic Party, the Conservative Party, and the Liberal Party, and one for the Progress Party. Kjell Opseth (Labour) is the longest-sitting minister, who sat a week short of six years. Lars Leiro (Centre) sat for only four weeks, giving him the shortest tenure. He both succeeded and preceded Trygve Bratteli, the only person to have held the position twice and the only officeholder to later become Prime Minister.

== Key ==
The following lists the minister, their party, the date they assumed and left office, their tenure in years and days, and the cabinet they served in.

Labour Party
Centre Party
Conservative Party
Christian Democratic Party
Liberal Party
Progress Party

== Ministers ==
Photo	Name	Party	Took office	Left office	Tenure	Cabinet	Ref
	Nils Langhelle	Labour	22 February 1946	5 January 1952	5 years, 317 days	Gerhardsen II; Torp	
	Jakob Martin Pettersen	Labour	5 January 1952	22 January 1955	3 years, 17 days	Torp	
—	Kolbjørn Varmann	Labour	22 January 1955	23 April 1960	5 years, 92 days	Gerhardsen III	
	Trygve Bratteli	Labour	23 April 1960	28 August 1963	3 years, 127 days	Gerhardsen III	
—	Lars Leiro	Centre	28 August 1963	25 September 1963	28 days	Lyng	
	Trygve Bratteli	Labour	25 September 1963	20 January 1964	117 days	Gerhardsen IV	
	Erik Himle	Labour	20 January 1964	12 October 1965	1 year, 265 days	Gerhardsen IV	
	Håkon Kyllingmark	Conservative	12 October 1965	17 March 1971	5 years, 156 days	Borten	
	Reiulf Steen	Labour	17 March 1971	18 October 1972	1 year, 215 days	Bratteli I	
—	John Austrheim	Centre	18 October 1972	16 October 1973	363 days	Korvald	
	Annemarie Lorentzen	Labour	16 October 1973	15 January 1976	2 years, 91 days	Bratteli II	
	Ragnar Christiansen	Labour	15 January 1976	11 January 1978	1 year, 361 days	Nordli	
—	Asbjørn Jordahl	Labour	11 January 1978	8 October 1979	1 year, 270 days	Nordli	
—	Ronald Bye	Labour	8 October 1979	14 October 1981	2 years, 6 days	Nordli; Brundtland I	
—	Inger Koppernæs	Conservative	14 October 1981	8 June 1983	1 year, 237 days	Willoch I	
	Johan J. Jakobsen	Centre	8 June 1983	9 May 1986	2 years, 335 days	Willoch II	
—	Kjell Borgen	Labour	9 May 1986	13 June 1988	2 years, 35 days	Brundtland II	
	William Engseth	Labour	13 June 1988	16 October 1989	1 year, 125 days	Brundtland II	
—	Lars Gunnar Lie	Christian Democratic	16 October 1989	3 November 1990	1 year, 18 days	Syse	
	Kjell Opseth	Labour	3 November 1990	25 October 1996	5 years, 357 days	Brundtland III	
—	Sissel Rønbeck	Labour	25 October 1996	17 October 1997	357 days	Jagland	
	Odd Einar Dørum	Liberal	17 October 1997	15 March 1999	1 year, 149 days	Bondevik I	
—	Dag Jostein Fjærvoll	Christian Democratic	15 March 1999	17 March 2000	1 year, 2 days	Bondevik I	
	Terje Moe Gustavsen	Labour	17 March 2000	19 October 2001	1 year, 216 days	Stoltenberg I	
	Torild Skogsholm	Liberal	19 October 2001	17 October 2005	3 years, 363 days	Bondevik II	
	Liv Signe Navarsete	Centre	17 October 2005	20 October 2009	4 years, 3 days	Stoltenberg II	
	Magnhild Meltveit Kleppa	Centre	20 October 2009	18 June 2012	2 years, 242 days	Stoltenberg II	
	Marit Arnstad	Centre	18 June 2012	16 October 2013	1 year, 120 days	Stoltenberg II	
	Ketil Solvik-Olsen	Progress	16 October 2013	31 August 2018	4 years, 319 days	Solberg	
	Jon Georg Dale	Progress	31 August 2018	24 January 2020	1 year, 146 days	Solberg	
	Knut Arild Hareide	Christian Democratic	24 January 2020	14 October 2021	1 year, 263 days	Solberg	
	Jon-Ivar Nygård	Labour	14 October 2021	11 September 2026	4 years, 332 days	Støre	
	Kamzy Gunaratnam	Labour	11 September 2026	present	0 days	Støre	
