= Cabinet Brundtland =

Cabinet Brundtland may refer to several governments of Norway under Prime Minister Gro Harlem Brundtland:

- First cabinet Brundtland, 4 February 1981 – 14 October 1981
- Second cabinet Brundtland, 9 May 1986 – 16 October 1989
- Third cabinet Brundtland, 3 November 1990 – 25 October 1996
