= Marit Wikholm =

Norwegian politician

Marit Wikholm, née Vevatne (born 3 July 1944) was a Norwegian politician for the Labour Party.

After lower secondary school in Laksevåg in 1961, she took a vocational education in retailing. She worked in a shop and a laundry before becoming a housewife in 1968. From 1971, she was the general manager of a family company.

Wikholm entered politics in 1974 and was elected to Hordaland county council in 1975 and re-elected twice to serve until 1987. She then served one term in Bergen city council until 1991. In her party, she was the deputy leader of the Bergen Labour Party from 1978 and then leader from 1981 to 1985. From 1979 to 1985, she was also a national board member of the Labour Party. Wikholm was the first female leader of the Bergen Labour Party and stated that her main political subject was environmental protection.

She served as a deputy representative to the Parliament of Norway from Hordaland during the terms 1981–1985, 1985–1989 and 1989–1993. She met as a regular representative in 1981 when Grete Knudsen was a member of Brundtland's First Cabinet, then from 1986 to 1989 when Hallvard Bakke was a member of Brundtland's Second Cabinet, and finally from 1992 to 1993 when Knudsen sat on Brundtland's Third Cabinet.

In Bergen, she sat on multiple boards and committees, among others, the board of Den Nationale Scene from 1979 to 1987. Nationwide, she sat on Statens Friluftsråd from 1978 and chaired it from 1983 before chairing Statens naturvernråd from 1987 to 1990.

In her later career, she worked as the party secretary of the Hordaland Labour Party from 1990 to 1997 and then the Akershus Labour Party from 1997 to 2006. At the time, she resided in Oslo.
