= Kjell Borgen =

Norwegian politician (1939–1996)

Minister of Local Government
- In office 3 November 1990 – 4 September 1992
- Prime Minister: Gro Harlem Brundtland
- Preceded by: Johan J. Jakobsen
- Succeeded by: Gunnar Berge
- In office 13 June 1988 – 16 October 1989
- Prime Minister: Gro Harlem Brundtland
- Preceded by: William Engseth
- Succeeded by: Johan J. Jakobsen

Minister of Transport and Communications
- In office 9 May 1986 – 13 June 1988
- Prime Minister: Gro Harlem Brundtland
- Preceded by: Johan J. Jakobsen
- Succeeded by: William Engseth

Minister of Nordic Cooperation
- In office 3 November 1990 – 4 September 1992
- Prime Minister: Gro Harlem Brundtland
- Preceded by: Tom Vraalsen
- Succeeded by: Gunnar Berge

County Governor of Hedmark
- In office 1 October 1993 – 22 August 1996
- Monarch: Harald V
- Prime Minister: Gro Harlem Brundtland
- Preceded by: Odvar Nordli
- Succeeded by: Sigbjørn Johnsen

Member of the Norwegian Parliament
- In office 1 October 1977 – 30 September 1993
- Deputy: Ingrid Nylund; Grethe Fossum
- Constituency: Hedmark

Chair of the Standing Committee on Transport and Communications
- In office 21 October 1981 – 30 September 1985
- Deputy: Lars Lefdal
- Preceded by: Arnold Weiberg-Aurdal
- Succeeded by: Oddrunn Pettersen

Personal details
- Born: 21 October 1939 Oslo, Norway
- Died: 22 August 1996 (aged 56)
- Party: Labour
- Parent(s): Jarle Borgen (father); Klara Kamphaug (mother)

Kjell Borgen (21 October 1939 – 22 August 1996) was a Norwegian politician for the Labour Party. He served as Minister of Transport and Communications from 1986 to 1988, Minister of Local Government from 1988 to 1989 and again from 1990 to 1992. He served as County Governor of Hedmark from 1993 until his death.

== Early life and career ==
He was born in Oslo as a son of a worker and a housewife. He attended the teacher's college in Elverum from 1960 to 1962. He worked as a secondary school teacher in Rendalen Municipality from 1962 to 1966, and also minored in Norwegian at the University of Oslo in 1964. From 1967 to 1972 he worked as headmaster at a combined primary-secondary school, and from 1972 he had a municipal administrative job.

Borgen chaired his regional branch of the Workers' Youth League from 1957 to 1959. He chaired his local Labour Party chapter from 1964 to 1967, and the county chapter from 1976 to 1980. He was a member of the Labour Party central committee from 1985 to 1993. Locally, Borgen became a member of the municipal council for the new Rendalen Municipality in 1965. In 1967 he became mayor, serving until 1977. He was a member of Hedmark county council from 1967 to 1979, from 1874 to 1975 as deputy county mayor (fylkesvaraordfører).

== National politics ==
In 1977, he was elected to the Parliament of Norway from Hedmark, and he was re-elected in 1981, 1985 and 1989. He served as President of the Lagting from 10 to 18 December 1979. When Prime Minister Gro Harlem Brundtland formed her Second Cabinet in 1986, Borgen became Minister of Transport and Communications. He remained so until 13 June 1988, when he became Norwegian Minister of Local Government and Labour.

According to Tore Lindholt, who released a book about the Norwegian State Railways in 1990, the same year as he served as acting director-general for the second time, Borgen was instrumental in removing Robert Nordén as director-general of the State Railways. Borgen asked Prime Minister Gro Harlem Brundtland to have Nordén removed, and when Brundtland gave the green light, Borgen told this to then-assisting director-general Lindholt over the telephone. Borgen also became slightly controversial due to the Oslo Airport localization debate. A decision to choose Hurum Municipality as the site of the new Oslo Airport was the reason for Borgen's withdrawal as Minister of Transport.

Borgen lost his position as Minister of Local Government and Labour when Brundtland's Second Cabinet fell in 1989. When Brundtland's Third Cabinet returned in 1990, Borgen returned as well, only under a slightly different name: Minister of Local Government. He made his exit in September 1992, and sat through his last term in Parliament, to 1993. While Borgen was Minister, his seat in Parliament was taken by Ingrid Nylund and Grethe Fossum.

Borgen finished his career with the position as County Governor of Hedmark from 1993. When Borgen died in August 1996, Ola Skjølaas became Acting County Governor.

Political offices
| Preceded by Arnold Weiberg-Aurdal | Chair of the Standing Committee on Transport; 1981–1985 | Succeeded by Oddrunn Pettersen |
| Preceded by Johan J. Jakobsen | Norwegian Minister of Transport and Communications; 1986–1988 | Succeeded by William Engseth |
| Preceded by William Engseth | Norwegian Minister of Local Government and Labour; 1988–1989 | Succeeded by Johan J. Jakobsen; Kristin Clemet |
| Preceded by Johan J. Jakobsen | Norwegian Minister of Local Government; 1990–1992 | Succeeded by Gunnar Berge |
Civic offices
| Preceded by Odvar Nordli | County Governor of Hedmark; 1993–1996 | Succeeded by Ola Skjølaas (acting) |
