= Syse cabinet =

Government of Norway from 1989 to 1990

Syse's Cabinet
- Cabinet of Norway

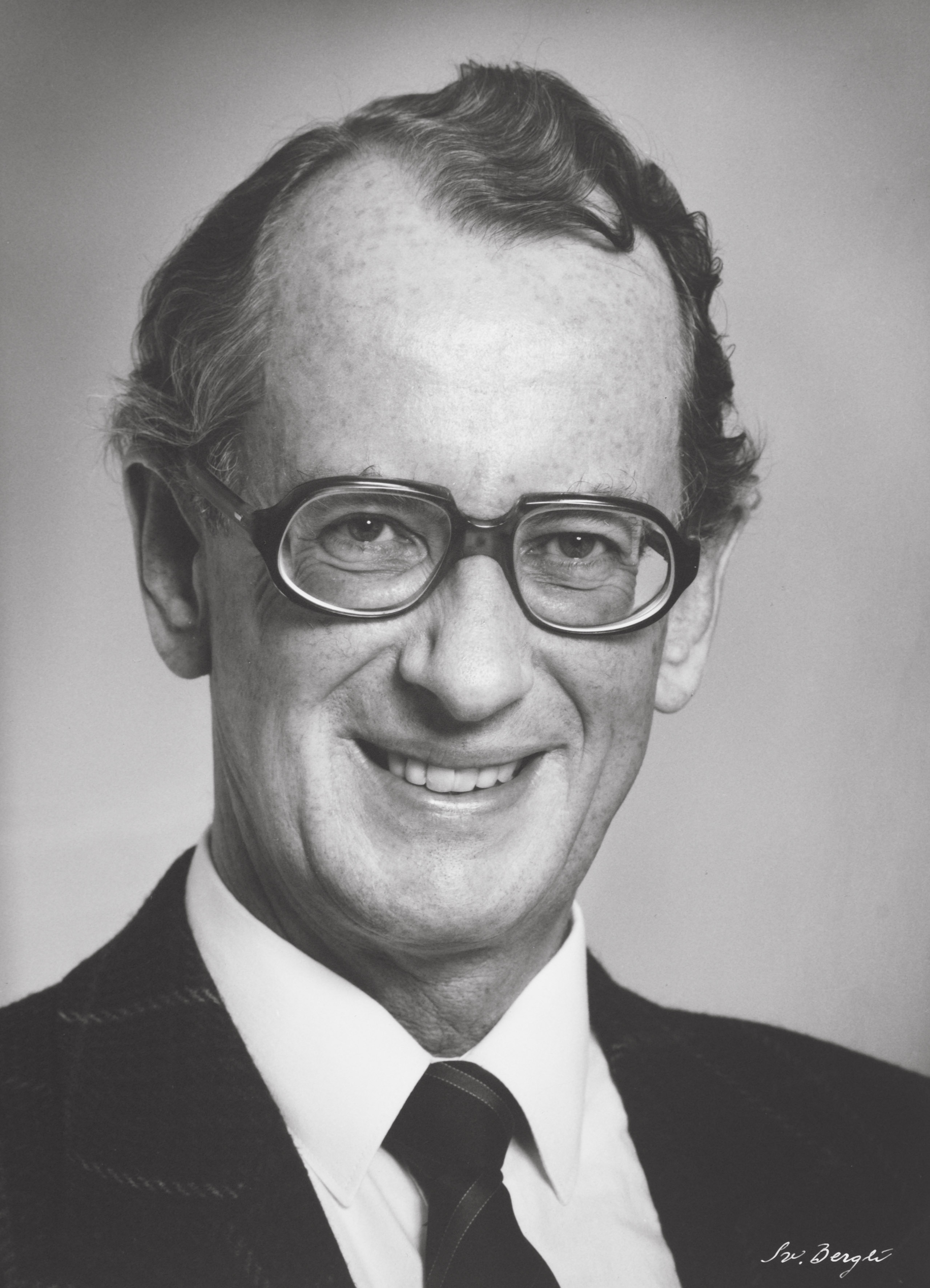
- Date formed: 16 October 1989
- Date dissolved: 3 November 1990

People and organisations
- King: Olav V of Norway
- Prime Minister: Jan Peder Syse
- Total no. of members: 19
- Member parties: Conservative Party; Centre Party; Christian Democratic Party
- Status in legislature: Coalition (minority)
- Opposition party: Labour

History
- Election: 1989 parliamentary election
- Predecessor: Brundtland's Second Cabinet
- Successor: Brundtland's Third Cabinet

Syse's Cabinet was a minority centre-right Conservative, Centre, Christian Democrat Government of Norway. It succeeded the Labour Second cabinet Brundtland after the 1989 election, and sat between 16 October 1989 and 3 November 1990. It was replaced by the Labour Third cabinet Brundtland after Centre left the coalition due to disagreement over possible Norwegian membership in the European Economic Area. This disagreement was anticipated as the cabinet operated with a suicide paragraph from the beginning. Syse's cabinet had the following composition:

== Cabinet members ==
Cabinet
Portfolio	Minister	Took office	Left office	Party
Prime Minister	Jan P. Syse	16 October 1989	3 November 1990	Conservative
Minister of Foreign Affairs	Kjell Magne Bondevik	16 October 1989	3 November 1990	Christian Democratic
Minister of Finance and Customs	Arne Skauge	16 October 1989	3 November 1990	Conservative
Minister of Defence	Per Ditlev-Simonsen	16 October 1989	3 November 1990	Conservative
Minister of Justice and the Police	Else Bugge Fougner	16 October 1989	3 November 1990	Conservative
Minister of Transport and Communications	Lars Gunnar Lie	16 October 1989	3 November 1990	Christian Democratic
Minister of Local Government	Johan J. Jakobsen	16 October 1989	3 November 1990	Centre
Minister of Education and Church Affairs (Note: Renamed Education and Research on 1 January 1990.)	Einar Steensnæs	16 October 1989	3 November 1990	Christian Democratic
Minister of Culture and Research	Eleonore Bjartveit	16 October 1989	3 November 1990	Christian Democratic
Minister of Social Affairs	Wenche Frogn Sellæg	16 October 1989	3 November 1990	Conservative
Minister of Family and Consumer Affairs	Solveig Sollie	16 October 1989	3 November 1990	Christian Democratic
Minister of Agriculture	Anne Petrea Vik	16 October 1989	3 November 1990	Centre
Minister of Industry	Petter Thomassen	16 October 1989	3 November 1990	Conservative
Minister of Trade and Shipping	Kaci Kullmann Five	16 October 1989	3 November 1990	Conservative
Minister of Government Administration and Labour	Kristin Clemet	16 October 1989	3 November 1990	Conservative
Minister of International Development; Minister of Nordic Cooperation	Tom Vraalsen	16 October 1989	3 November 1990	Centre
Minister of the Environment	Kristin Hille Valla	16 October 1989	3 November 1990	Centre
Minister of Petroleum and Energy	Eivind Reiten	16 October 1989	3 November 1990	Centre
Minister of Fisheries	Svein Munkejord	16 October 1989	3 November 1990	Conservative

== See also ==
- Norwegian Council of State
- Government of Norway
- List of Norwegian governments

== Notes ==
Preceded by Second cabinet Brundtland	Norwegian Council of State; 1989–1990	Succeeded by Third cabinet Brundtland
