= Annemarie Lorentzen =

Norwegian politician (1921–2008)

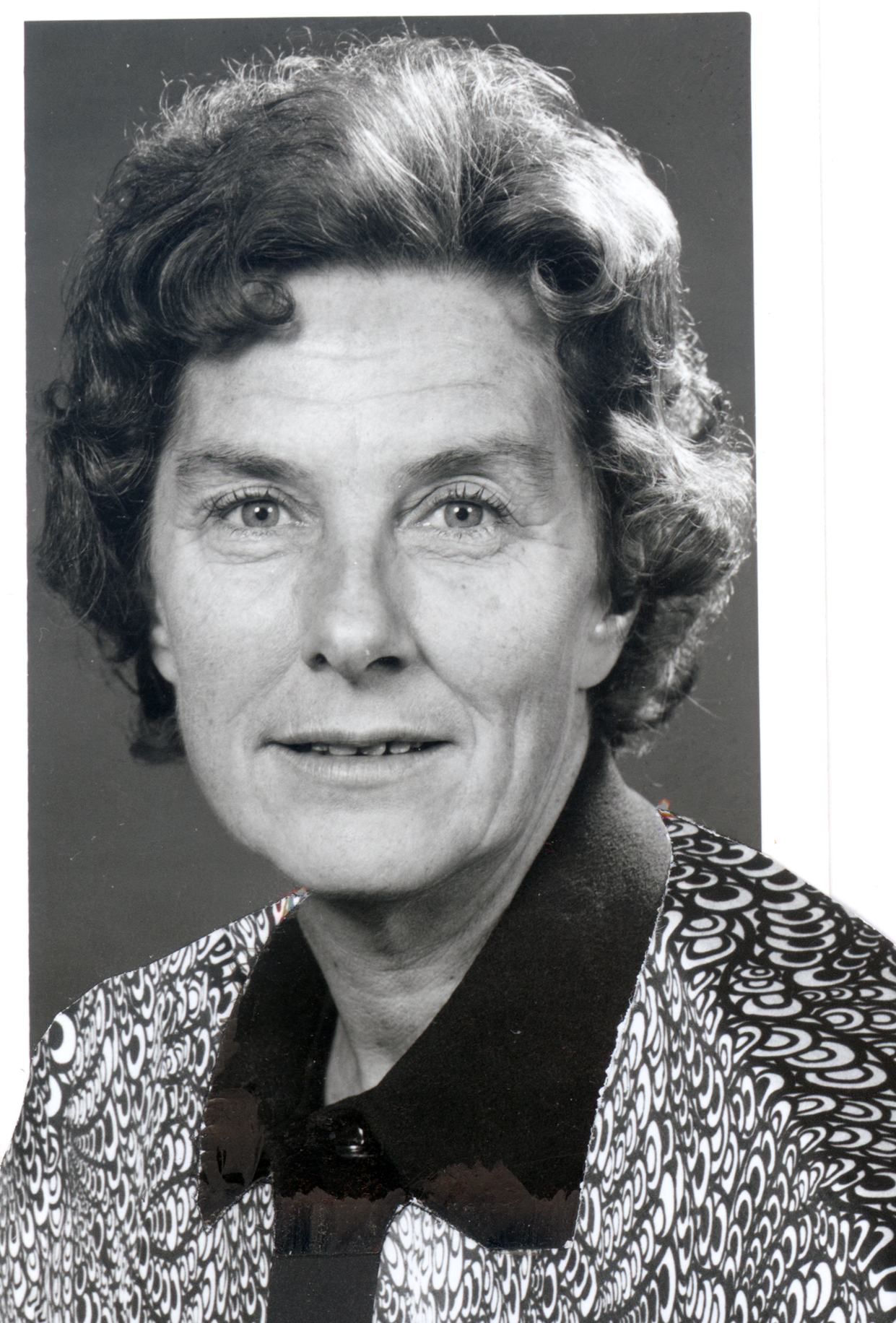

Minister of Administration and Consumer Affairs
- In office 15 January 1976 – 11 January 1978
- Prime Minister: Odvar Nordli
- Preceded by: Odd Sagør
- Succeeded by: Kirsten Myklevoll

Minister of Transport and Communications
- In office 16 October 1973 – 15 January 1976
- Prime Minister: Trygve Bratteli
- Preceded by: John Austrheim
- Succeeded by: Ragnar Christiansen

Member of the Norwegian Parliament
- In office 1 October 1969 – 30 September 1977
- Constituency: Finnmark

Deputy Member of the Norwegian Parliament
- In office 1 January 1954 – 30 September 1965
- Constituency: Finnmark

Personal details
- Born: 23 September 1921 Sør-Varanger, Finnmark, Norway
- Died: 30 June 2008 (aged 86) Hammerfest, Finnmark, Norway
- Party: Labour

Annemarie Røstvik Lorentzen (23 September 1921 – 30 June 2008) was a Norwegian politician for the Labour Party. She was the first female Norwegian Minister of Transport and Communications, in addition to being Minister of Consumer Affairs and Administration and Norwegian ambassador to Iceland. Lorentzen played a major role in the post-World War II reconstruction of Hammerfest after it was razed by the fleeing Nazi occupiers.

She was elected to the Norwegian Parliament from Finnmark in 1969, and was re-elected on one occasion. She had previously served as a deputy representative during the terms 1954–1957 and 1961–1965.

From 1973 to 1977, Lorentzen was appointed to the second cabinet Bratteli. During this period her seat in parliament was taken by Per A. Utsi. She was Minister of Transport and Communications from 1973 to 1976 and Minister of Consumer Affairs and Administration from 1976 to 1978.

She was born in Sør-Varanger Municipality, but worked in Hammerfest as a teacher from 1947 to 1969. She was a member of the municipal council of Hammerfest Municipality from 1951 to 1963. From 1961 to 1965 she chaired the regional party chapter of Vest-Finnmark. From 1961 to 1969 she was a member of the national Labour Party board.

After her time as government minister, she was appointed Norwegian ambassador to Iceland. She served in this capacity from 1978 to 1985.

Political offices
Preceded by John Austrheim	Norwegian Minister of Transport and Communications; 1973–1976	Succeeded by Ragnar Christiansen
Preceded by Odd Sagør	Norwegian Minister of Administration and Consumer Affairs; 1976–1978	Succeeded by Kirsten Myklevoll
