= Eldrid Nordbø =

Norwegian politician (1942–2026)

Eldrid Nordbø (12 August 1942 – 8 April 2026) was a Norwegian civil servant and politician for the Labour Party.

== Life and career ==
Nordbø was born in Skien, and grew up in Nissedal Municipality. She finished her secondary education at Telemark offentlige landsgymnas in Bø in 1962, later graduating from the University of Oslo with a mag.art. degree in political science in 1968.

She was personal secretary to the Minister of Social Affairs in 1971–72 before becoming a city politician in Oslo. She was elected to the executive committee of its city council from 1971 to 1979, serving as a kommunalråd from 1972. From 1981 to 1986 she was a civil servant, being deputy under-secretary of state in the Ministry of Local Government. She entered partisan politics again as State Secretary at the Office of the Prime Minister from 1986 to 1989 followed by Minister of Trade and Shipping in Brundtland's Third Cabinet from 1990 to 1991. Lastly, she was permanent under-secretary of state in the Ministry of Social Affairs and Heealth from 1992 to 1996, and deputy under-secretary of state in the Ministry of the Environment from 1996.

Nordbø sat on the board of Statistics Norway 1982–83 and theinternational committee of the Norwegian Red Cross. Internationally, she was a delegate to the UNCED and WHO, sat on the board of the European WHO Office from 1994 to 1997 and led the environmental committee of the OECD from 1997 to 2000.

She was married to economist and politician Bjørn Skogstad Aamo (1946–2023). Nordbø died on 8 April 2026, aged 83.

Civic offices
Preceded by Jon Ola Norbom	Permanent under-secretary of state in the Ministry of Social Affairs; 1993–1996	Succeeded by Steinar Stokke
