= John Austrheim =

Norwegian politician (1912–1995)

Minister of Transport and Communications
- In office 18 October 1972 – 16 October 1973
- Prime Minister: Lars Korvald
- Preceded by: Reiulf Steen
- Succeeded by: Annemarie Lorentzen

Leader of the Centre Party
- In office 1967–1973
- Preceded by: Per Borten
- Succeeded by: Dagfinn Vårvik

Mayor of Gloppen
- In office 1956–1962
- Preceded by: Alf Gloppestad
- Succeeded by: Elias Eimhjellen

Personal details
- Born: 10 October 1912 Gloppen Municipality, Nordre Bergenhus, Norway
- Died: 13 April 1995 (aged 82)
- Party: Centre
- Spouse: Ingeborg Austrheim

John Austrheim (10 October 1912 – 13 April 1995) was a Norwegian politician, farmer for the Centre Party.

Born in Gloppen Municipality in Nordre Bergenhus county, Austrheim had no more than a primary education, and worked as a farmer when he was elected mayor of Gloppen Municipality in 1955. He had previously served on the municipal council of Gloppen Municipality from 1945 to 1951, and served as mayor until 1962. In 1967 he was elected leader of the Centre Party, a position he took over after Per Borten, who was serving as Prime Minister at the time. Austrheim held this post until 1973.

He was elected to the Norwegian Parliament from Østfold in 1961, and was re-elected on three occasions. He had previously served in the position of deputy representative during the term 1958–1961. Borten's Cabinet resigned in 1971, but when the Centre Party returned to power on 18 October 1972, Austrheim was appointed Minister of Transport and Communications in the new cabinet of Lars Korvald. He served in this position until the government resigned on 16 October 1973. During his time in cabinet he was replaced in the Norwegian Parliament by Ambjørg Sælthun and, briefly, Leiv Erdal.

Political offices
Preceded by Reiulf Steen	Norwegian Minister of Transport and Communications; 1972–1973	Succeeded by Annemarie Lorentzen
Party political offices
Preceded by Per Borten	Chairman of the Norwegian Centre Party; 1967–1973	Succeeded by Dagfinn Vårvik
