= Ronald Bye =

Norwegian politician (1937–2018)

Party Secretary of the Labour Party
- In office 1969–1975
- Preceded by: Haakon Lie
- Succeeded by: Ivar Leveraas

Minister of Transport and Communications
- In office 8 October 1979 – 14 October 1981
- Prime Minister: Odvar Nordli; Gro Harlem Brundtland
- Preceded by: Asbjørn Jordahl
- Succeeded by: Inger Koppernæs

Personal details
- Born: Ronald Joseph Bye; 23 November 1937 Oslo, Norway
- Died: 24 September 2018 (aged 80)
- Party: Labour
- Spouse: Tove Heggen Larsen
- Occupation: Politician

Ronald Joseph Bye (23 November 1937 – 24 September 2018) was a Norwegian politician for the Labour Party. He was Minister of Transport and Communications from 1979–1981.
