= Jan Fredrik Wiborg =

Norwegian civil engineer

Jan Fredrik Wiborg (9 October 1944 – 21 June 1994) was a Norwegian civil engineer.

During the early 1990s, he criticised plans for building Oslo's new airport at Gardermoen. The Parliament of Norway had originally decided to build the new airport at Hurumlandet, but weather surveys claimed this location would only be operable 80% of the time. Wiborg claimed the information was falsified and that parliament were deliberately misled by government officials.

Wiborg died on 21 June 1994 after falling from a hotel window in Copenhagen, and crucial documents about the case disappeared. . Circumstances about his death was never fully cleared, Journalists from the newspaper Aftenposten were awarded the prestigious SKUP prize in 1999 for their investigation of the case.

In 2000 the parliamentary Standing Committee on Scrutiny and Constitutional Affairs held a public hearing about the alleged foul play during the airport planning process. An official report was released in 2001.

== See also ==
- Oslo Airport location controversy
