= Jan Henry T. Olsen =

Norwegian politician (1956–2018)

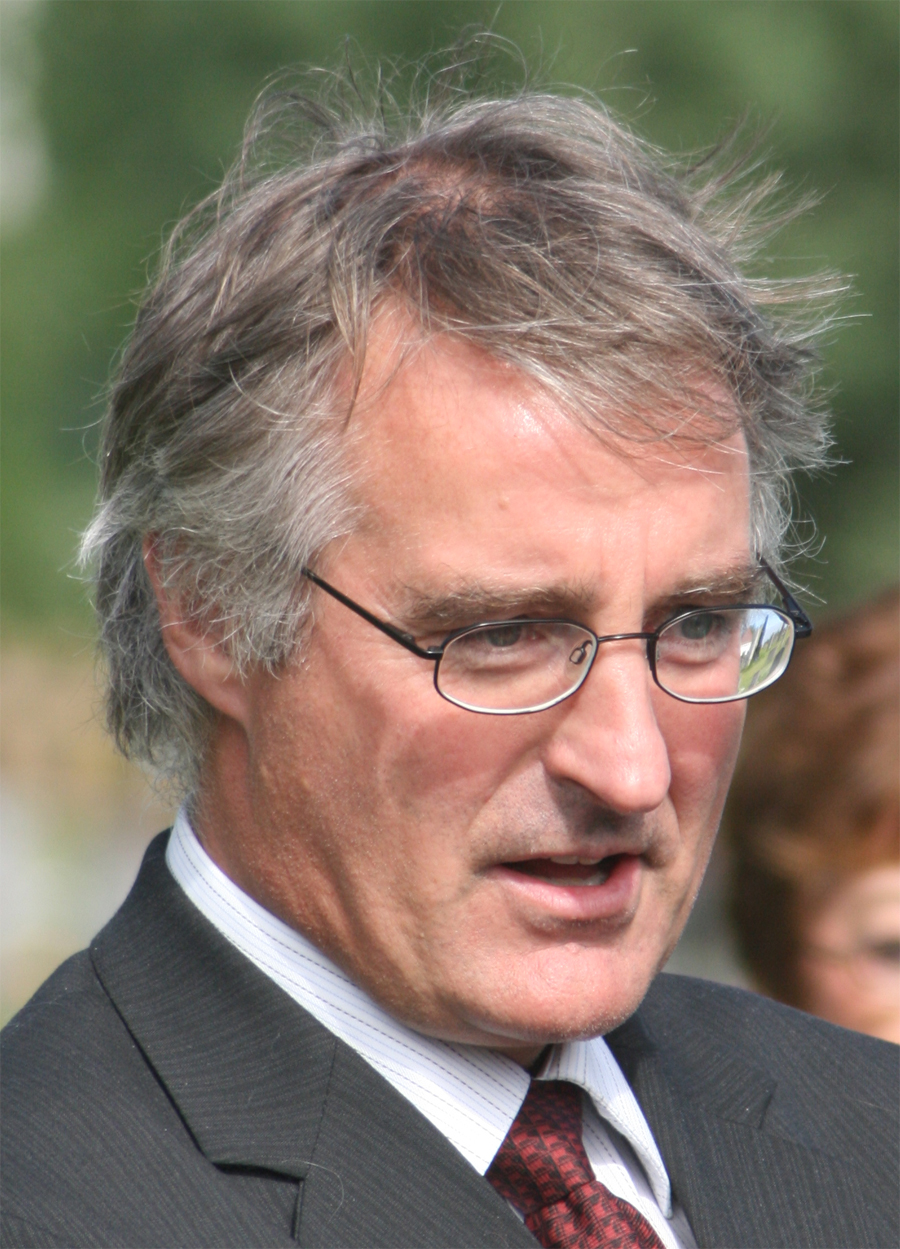
- Olsen in 2008.

Minister of Fisheries
- In office 4 September 1992 – 25 October 1996
- Prime Minister: Gro Harlem Brundtland
- Preceded by: Oddrunn Pettersen
- Succeeded by: Karl Eirik Schjøtt-Pedersen

County Mayor of Troms
- In office 1 January 1992 – 4 September 1992
- Preceded by: Kirsten Myklevoll
- Succeeded by: Gunn Langaas

Personal details
- Born: Jan Henry Tungeland Olsen; 20 August 1956 Bergen, Hordaland, Norway
- Died: 10 July 2018 (aged 61)
- Party: Labour
- Spouse: Laila Lanes
- Children: 3

Jan Henry Tungeland Olsen (20 August 1956 – 10 July 2018) was a Norwegian politician for the Labour Party. He was Minister of Fisheries from 1992 to 1996. He got the nickname "No-fish Olsen" during the negotiations of a possible membership for Norway in the European Union, when he said he was not going to give a single fish to the EU.

In March 2008, Olsen told the Norwegian newspaper Nordlys that at the age of 51 he had been diagnosed with Alzheimer's disease. His wife, Laila Lanes, published the book "Skynd deg å elske" in 2009, chronicling his life and his struggle with Alzheimer's. A documentary was released in 2011, showing the former politician's battle with the disease over the span of twelve months. Olsen spent his final years in hospice care. He died from the disease on 10 July 2018, aged 61.
