= Per A. Utsi =

Norwegian politician (1939–2024)

Per Alfred Utsi (8 March 1939 – 13 September 2024) was a Norwegian politician for the Labour Party.

== Life and career ==
Utsi was elected to the Norwegian Parliament from Finnmark in 1977, and was re-elected on one occasion. He had previously served as a deputy representative during the terms 1969–1973 and 1973–1977. During the latter term he served as a regular representative meanwhile Annemarie Lorentzen was appointed to the second cabinet Bratteli and the cabinet Nordli.

On the local level he was a deputy member of the executive committee of the municipal council for Sør-Varanger Municipality from 1971 to 1975. He chaired the party chapter in Vardø, where he worked in the newspaper Finnmarken, from 1965 to 1966 and was later a board member of the regional chapter. From 1967 to 1973 he was the district secretary of the Norwegian Confederation of Trade Unions.

Utsi died on 13 September 2024, at the age of 85.

== Sources ==
- "Per A. Utsi" (in Norwegian). Storting.
