= Suicide paragraph =

Term in the politics of Norway

A suicide paragraph (Norwegian: selvmordsparagraf), sometimes referred to as a suicide clause, is an important term in the politics of Norway. It is a part of the formal agreements between political parties on forming a coalition government. It states that if a certain political case is brought up, the coalition is considered dissolved.

== Use in Norway ==
=== Syse Cabinet ===
In practice, the use has usually related to the question of Norway and the European Union. This question is a cross-cutting cleavage, splitting parties who would otherwise be more cooperating. It was first used by Jan P. Syse's Cabinet, which assumed office in 1989. It was known from the 1972 EEC referendum that the "European question" was a divisive one in Norwegian politics, and the coalition parties (Conservative, Christian Democratic, Centre) held different views. The "suicide paragraph" was a part of a 22-point declaration that was put together after the 1989 general election (not before, as had been the tradition during the 1980s). Through the paragraph, the coalition parties "agreed to disagree" on the issue. As it turned out, the suicide paragraph and the European question caused the coalition to dissolve after only one year. The strongly EU-sceptical Centre Party parted ways with the pro-EU Conservatives, and the parties have not been coalition partners since. A Labour cabinet took over, proposed and negotiated EU membership but backed down after the 1994 referendum in which the electorate rejected this.

=== Bondevik Cabinet ===
Labour held office until after the 1997 general election. Kjell Magne Bondevik's First Cabinet, a coalition of the Christian Democratic, Centre and Liberal parties, assumed office then, but did not have a suicide paragraph. However, when Kjell Magne Bondevik's Second Cabinet (Christian Democratic, Conservative, Liberal) assumed office in 2001, a suicide paragraph was a part of the post-election Declaration of Sem. Unlike in 1989, it was not clear that the EU was an actual forthcoming issue. However, the parties decided to keep it as a safeguard, and the paragraph now meant that the coalition would disband if the European question reached the broader political "agenda". Prime Minister Kjell Magne Bondevik represented an EU-sceptical party, and was personally prepared to resign, an action which would dissolve the cabinet. Dagbladet's commentator noted that the will to remain in coalition was strong, so the suicide paragraph actually vitalized Bondevik's Second Cabinet, securing a state of non-debate and thus a prolonged life of the coalition. The cabinet remained intact throughout the term.

=== Stoltenberg Cabinet ===
Long before the fall of Bondevik's Second Cabinet, a group of opposition parties (Labour, Centre, Socialist Left) had discussions on a possible Red-Green Coalition. Long before the 2005 general election it was speculated that such a coalition would need suicide paragraph as much as Bondevik's coalition. This was officially confirmed by the EU-sceptical party leaders of the Centre and Socialist Left parties after the election victory, on the day the Red-Green Coalition (Jens Stoltenberg's Second Cabinet) began drafting their First Declaration of Soria Moria. The end declaration did in fact contain a suicide paragraph, and the pro-EU Minister of Foreign Affairs Jonas Gahr Støre declared his adherence to the principle. On the other hand, it became clear that the Socialist Left Party had to sacrifice their scepticism towards NATO (in 2014, the coalition's leader even became their secretary-general), and their general anti-Americanism. The cabinet remained intact, and even won re-election in 2009.
