= Ola Skjølaas =

Norwegian veterinarian, civil servant and politician

Ola Skjølaas (18 September 1941 – 7 July 2006) was a Norwegian veterinarian, civil servant and politician for the Labour Party.

He was born in Søndre Land Municipality. A veterinarian by education, he took his doctoral degree in Hannover in 1969. He was district veterinarian in Tana Municipality from 1970 to 1977 and then in Hedmark/Oppland. He was a personal secretary (today known as political advisor) in the Norwegian Ministry of Agriculture from 1978 to 1979, and State Secretary from 1979 to 1981 and 1986 to 1987. He was hired in the County Governor's Office of Hedmark in 1982 as director of environmental protection. He was assisting County Governor from 1990 to 1997. He was Acting County Governor in 1996, after Kjell Borgen's death the same year. From 1997 to 2004 Skjølaas served as county veterinarian in Hedmark and Oppland.

He was a freemason, and lived in Hamar. He died in July 2006.

Civic offices
Preceded by Kjell Borgen	County Governor of Hedmark (acting); 1996–1997	Succeeded by Jon Arvid Lea (acting)
