= Leiv Erdal =

Norwegian politician

Leiv Erdal (11 August 1915 – 20 November 2009) was a Norwegian military officer, bailiff and politician for the Centre Party.

He was born in Naustdal Municipality as a son of farmer, bailiff and mayor Bendik Henriksen Erdal (1879–1937) and housewife Oleanna Mathiasdatter Naustdal (1884–1966). He finished primary school in 1929 and worked from 1930 to 1933 with farming and animals. From 1933 to 1934 he attended Fana Folk High School, and he then attended agricultural school in Førde for two years.

He underwent officer training in Bergen to 1937. He became a sergeant in 1938 and a second lieutenant (Fenrik) in 1939. During World War II he fought for Norway in Valdres and Fjordane during the Norwegian Campaign in 1940. He was decorated with the Defence Medal 1940–1945. He was the bailiff of Fjaler Municipality from 1940 to 1941 and acting bailiff of Naustdal from 1941 to 1942, but was then fired by the Nazi authorities. From 1942 to 1945 he worked for Vestlandske Kjøpelag, now a part of Felleskjøpet.

After the war, in 1945, he briefly worked with the treason investigations. He was the acting bailiff of Naustdal from 1945 to 1947 and then on a permanent basis until 1982, from 1945 to 1963 in Vevring Municipality in addition to Naustdal Municipality, and from 1977 to 1982 in Førde Municipality as well. In Naustdal Municipality, he was a member of the school board from 1958 to 1963 (and the county school board from 1976 to 1979), was the public trustee from 1964 to 1991 and chaired the conciliation board from 1980 to 1991. He was a deputy board member of Folketrygdfondet from 1972 to 1984 and chaired Sunnfjord history association and Sunnfjord Folkemuseum from 1972 to 1986. He was also involved in Noregs Ungdomslag and chaired his countywide trade union from 1973 to 1975.

He chaired his local party chapter from 1956 to 1957 and the county chapter from 1966 to 1978. He was a national board member of the Centre Party from 1966 to 1978 and a central board deputy member from 1975 to 1977. He was a member of the municipal council of Naustdal Municipality from 1951 to 1963, the last four years in the executive committee. He served as a deputy representative to the Parliament of Norway from Sogn og Fjordane during the terms 1969–1973 and 1973–1977. From 1 to 16 October 1973 he met regularly for John Austrheim, who was a member of the outgoing Korvald's Cabinet. In total he met during 138 days of parliamentary sessions.
