= Asbjørn Jordahl =

Norwegian journalist and politician (1932–2025)

Minister of Transport and Communications
- In office 11 January 1978 – 8 October 1979
- Prime Minister: Odvar Nordli
- Preceded by: Ragnar Christiansen
- Succeeded by: Ronald Bye

Member of the Norwegian Parliament
- In office 1 October 1977 – 30 September 1981
- Constituency: Møre og Romsdal

Mayor of Kristiansund
- In office 1 January 1968 – 30 September 1977
- Preceded by: Worm Eide
- Succeeded by: Ole Stokke

Personal details
- Born: Asbjørn Reidar Jordahl; 12 December 1932 Kristiansund, Møre og Romsdal, Norway
- Died: 16 July 2025 (aged 92)
- Party: Labour

Asbjørn Reidar Jordahl (12 December 1932 – 16 July 2025) was a Norwegian journalist and a politician for the Labour Party. Jordahl worked for the newspaper Tidens Krav in Kristiansund from 1959 to 1967. He represented Møre og Romsdal in the Norwegian Parliament 1977–1981, and served as Minister of Transport and Communications 1978–1979. In 1981 he became editor-in-chief of Tidens Krav. Jordahl died on 16 July 2025, at the age of 92.

Political offices
Preceded by Ragnar Christiansen	Norwegian Minister of Transport and Communications; 1978–1979	Succeeded by Ronald Bye
