= Svein Aasmundstad =

Norwegian civil servant (1935–2012)

state secretary in the Ministry of Transport
- In office 1979–1980

Personal details
- Born: 13 January 1935
- Died: 10 April 2012
- Occupation: civil servant

Svein Aasmundstad (13 January 1935 – 10 April 2012) was a Norwegian civil servant.

He was born in Trondheim, and graduated as cand.jur. He worked as CFO in Trondheim municipality from 1973 to 1976, and as chief administrative officer in Oppland county from 1976 to 1987, only interrupted by a spell as state secretary in the Ministry of Transport from 1979 during the Nordli's Cabinet. He was appointed as the first director of the Financial Supervisory Authority of Norway in 1987, and served to 1992. From 1994 to 1995 he was the managing director of NAVO (today known as Arbeidsgiverforeningen Spekter).

Government offices
| Preceded by position created | Director of the Financial Supervisory Authority of Norway; 1987–1992 | Succeeded by Bjørn Skogstad Aamo |
