= Inger Koppernæs =

Norwegian politician

Minister of Transport and Communications
- In office 14 October 1981 – 8 June 1983
- Prime Minister: Kåre Willoch
- Preceded by: Ronald Bye
- Succeeded by: Johan J. Jakobsen

Member of the Norwegian Parliament
- In office 1 October 1981 – 30 September 1989
- Constituency: Møre og Romsdal

Deputy Member of the Norwegian Parliament
- In office 1 October 1973 – 30 September 1981
- Constituency: Møre og Romsdal

Personal details
- Born: 15 August 1928 Gjøvik, Oppland, Norway
- Died: 15 August 1990 (aged 62)
- Party: Conservative

Inger Koppernæs (15 August 1928 – 15 August 1990) was a Norwegian politician for the Conservative Party. She was Minister of Transport and Communications from 1981 to 1983. She was deputy representative to the Storting from 1973 to 1981 and permanent representative from 1981 to 1989.

Political offices
Preceded by Ronald Bye	Norwegian Minister of Transport and Communications; 1981–1983	Succeeded by Johan J. Jakobsen
