= 1985 Norwegian parliamentary election =

- 8-9 September 1985

All 157 seats in the Storting 79 seats needed for a majority
- Turnout: 84%
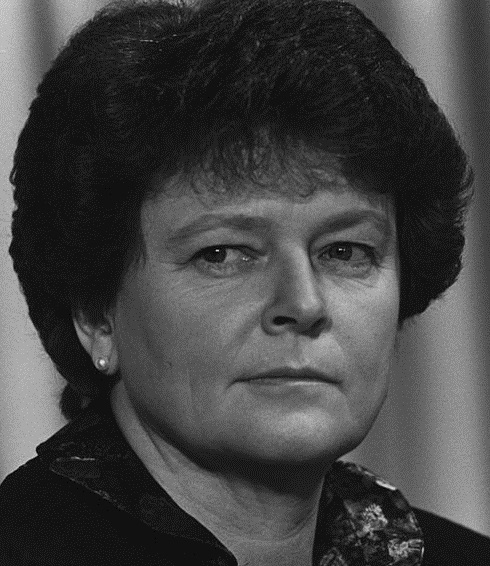

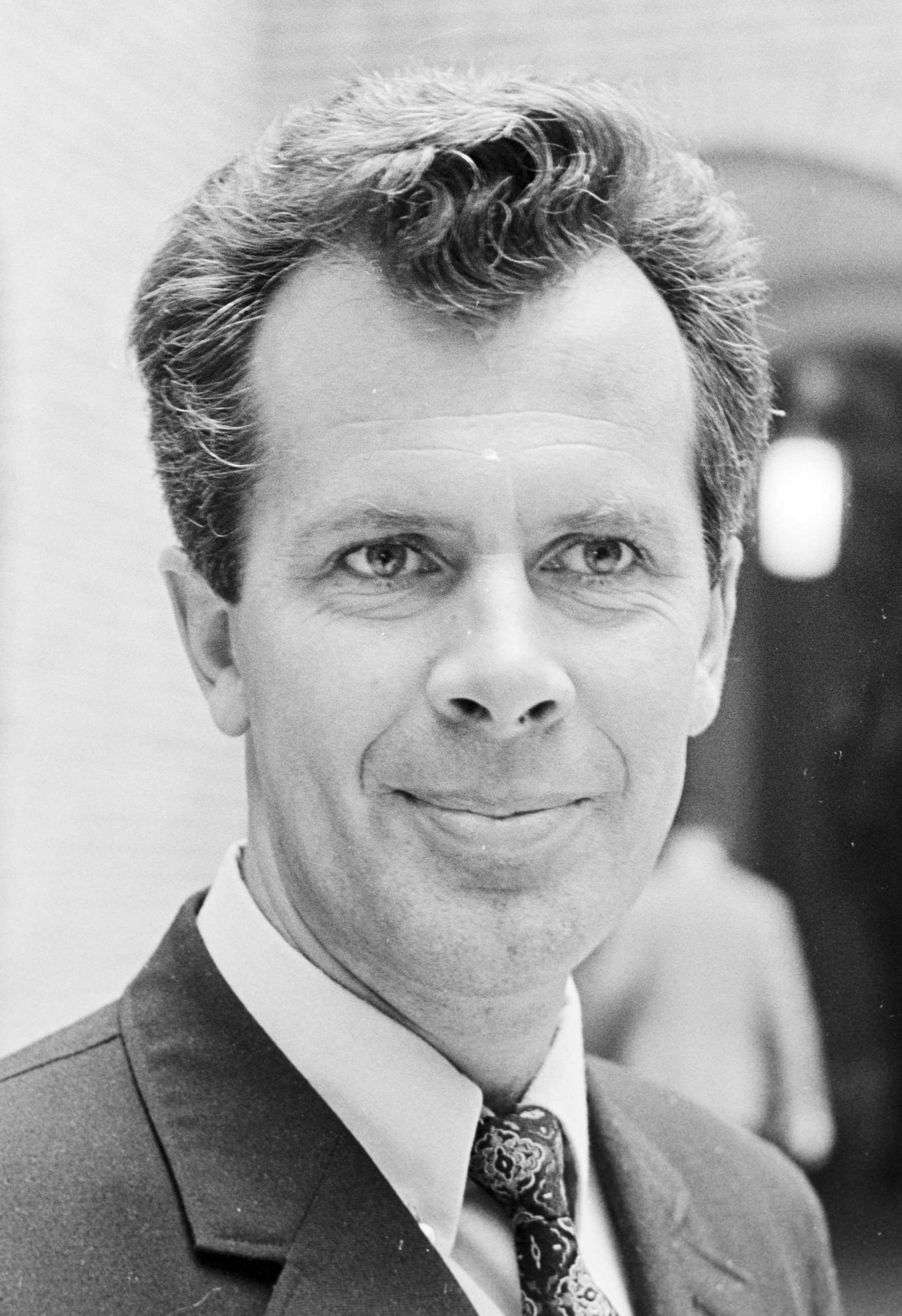

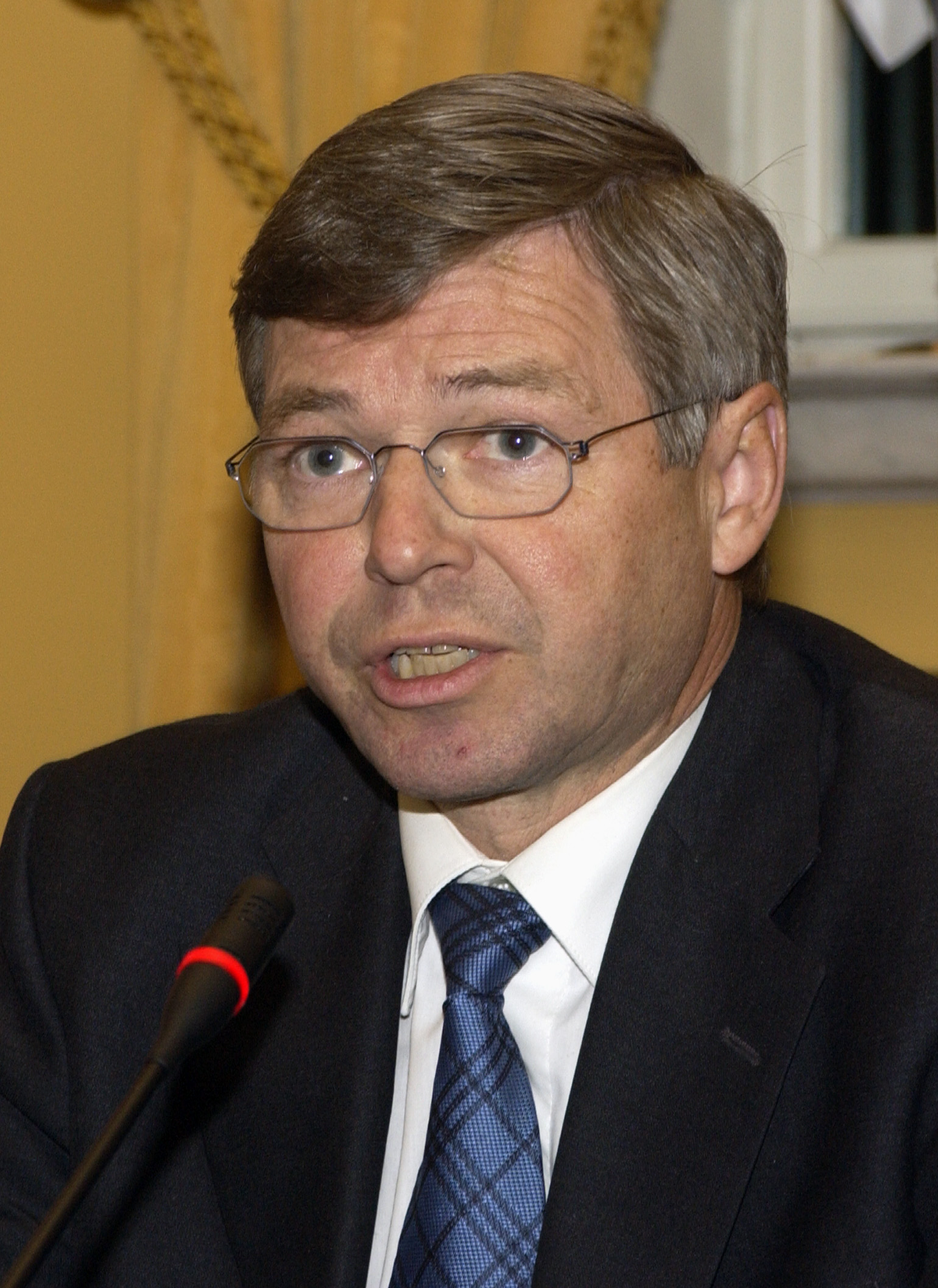

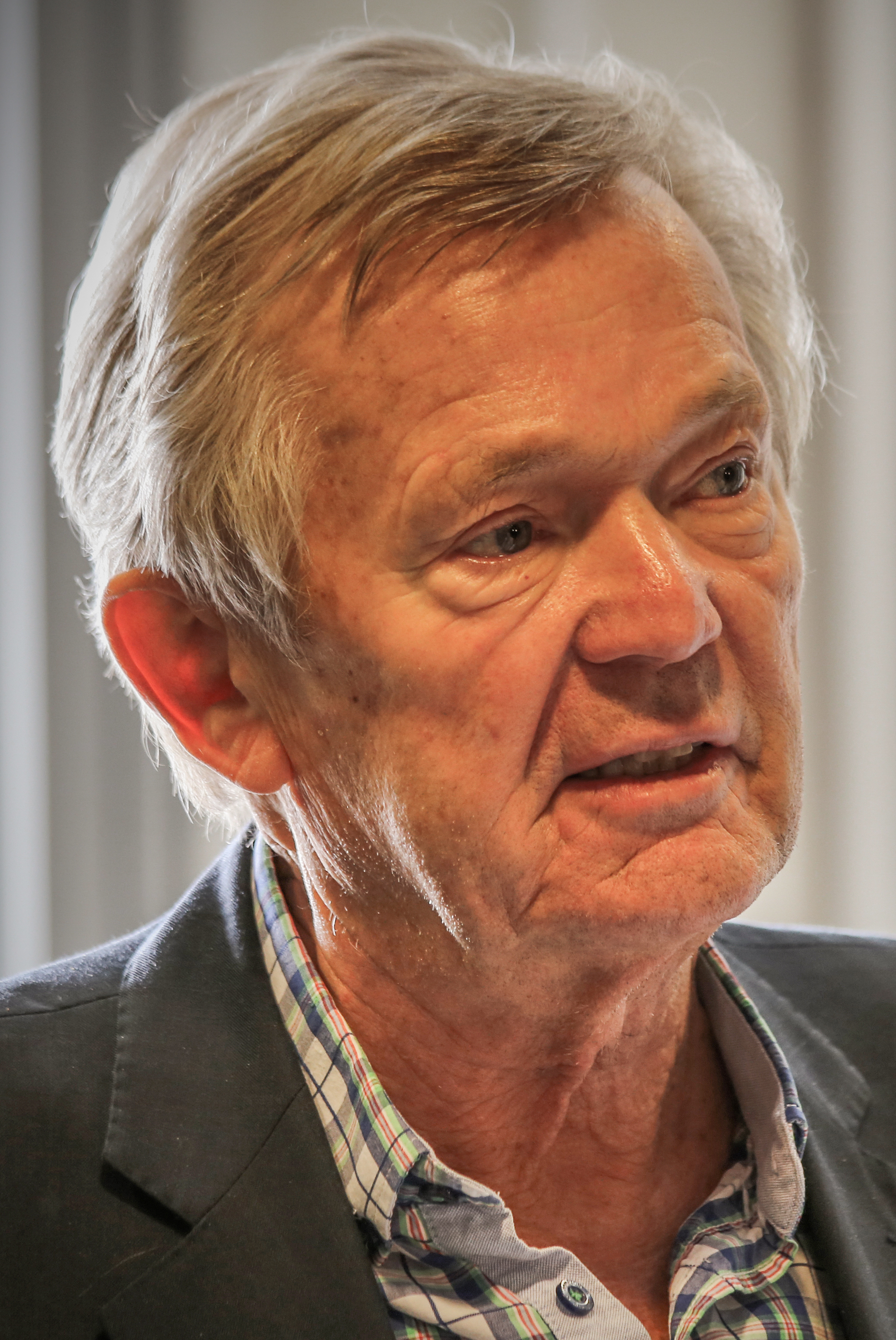

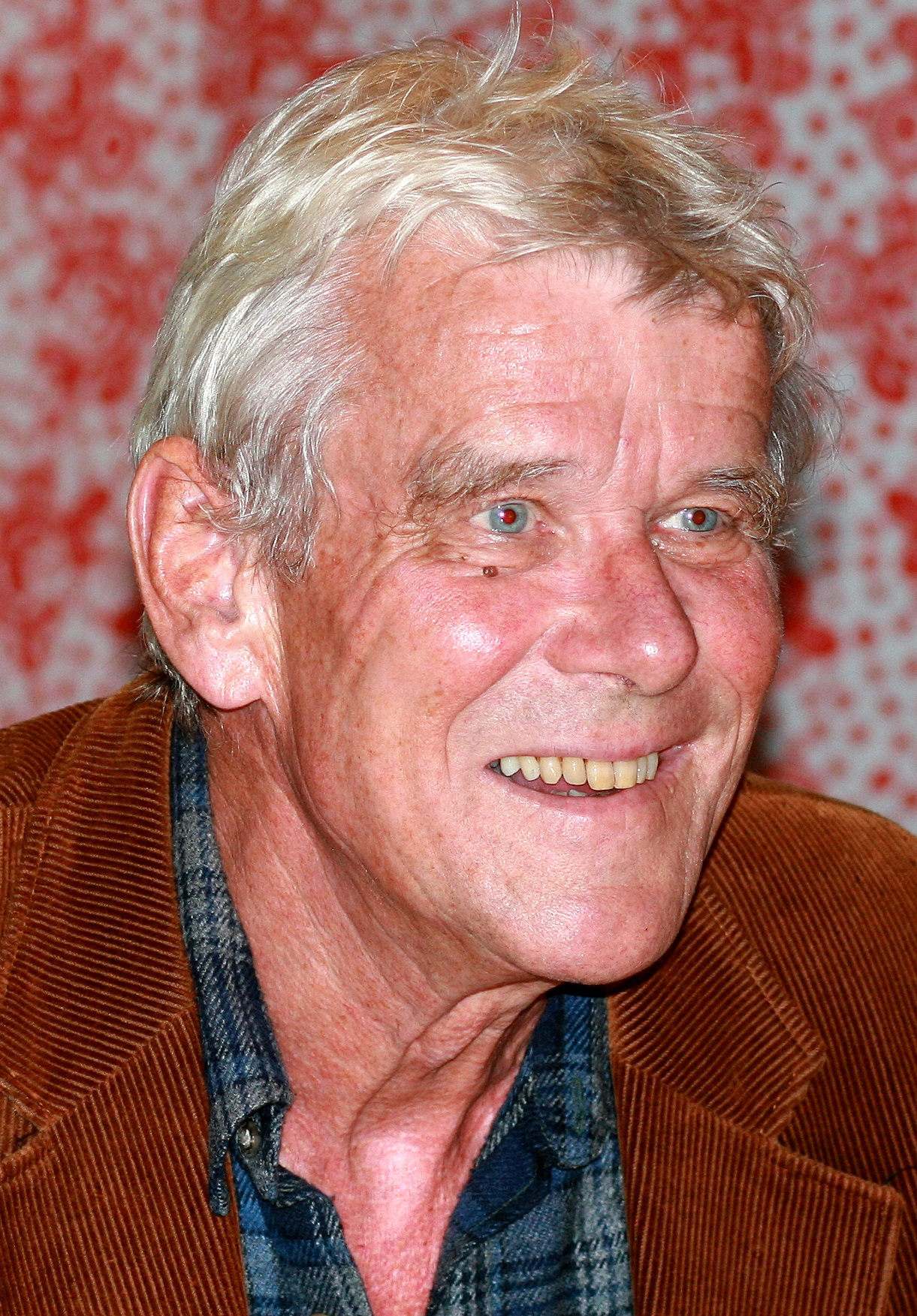

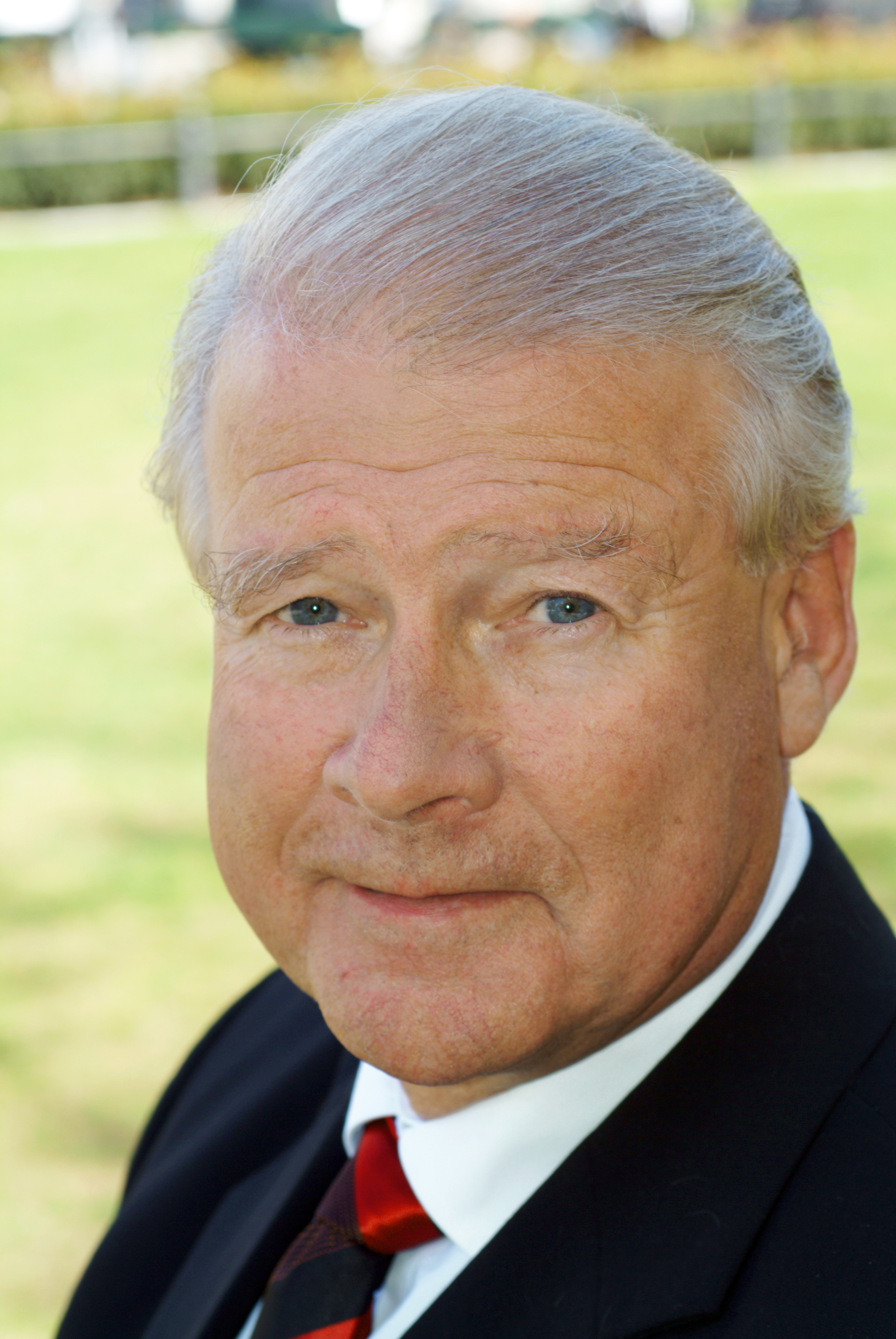
	First party	Second party	Third party
Leader	Gro Harlem Brundtland	Erling Norvik	Kjell Magne Bondevik
Party	Labour	Conservative	Christian; Democratic
Last election	37.2%, 66 seats	35.3%, 53 seats	12.5%, 15 seats
Seats won	71	50	16
Seat change	▲5	▼3	▲1
Popular vote	1,061,712	791,537	214,969
Percentage	40.8%	30.4%	8.3%
	Fourth party	Fifth party	Sixth party
Leader	Johan J. Jakobsen	Theo Koritzinsky	Carl I. Hagen
Party	Centre	Socialist Left	Progress
Last election	7.8%, 11 seats	4.9%, 4 seats	4.5%, 4 seats
Seats won	12	6	2
Seat change	▲1	▲2	▼2
Popular vote	171,770	141,950	96,797
Percentage	6.6%	5.5%	3.7%
- Largest bloc and seats won by constituency
Prime Minister before election
Kåre Willoch
Conservative
Prime Minister after election
Kåre Willoch
Conservative

Parliamentary elections were held in Norway on 8 and 9 September 1985. The Labour Party remained the largest party in the Storting, winning 71 of the 157 seats. It was the first election since 1885 in which the Liberal Party failed to win a seat.

== Contesting parties ==
Name		Ideology	Position	Leader	1981 result	
Name		Ideology	Position	Leader	Votes (%)	Seats
Ap	Labour Party; Arbeiderpartiet	Social democracy	Centre-left	Gro Harlem Brundtland	37.2%	66 / 155
H	Conservative Party; Høyre	Conservatism	Centre-right	Erling Norvik	31.7%	53 / 155
KrF	Christian Democratic Party; Kristelig Folkeparti	Christian democracy	Centre to centre-right	Kjell Magne Bondevik	8.9%	15 / 155
SV	Socialist Left Party; Sosialistisk Venstreparti	Democratic socialism	Left-wing	Theo Koritzinsky	4.9%	4 / 155
FrP	Progress Party; Fremskrittspartiet	Classical liberalism	Right-wing	Carl I. Hagen	4.4%	4 / 155
Sp	Centre Party; Senterpartiet	Agrarianism	Centre	Johan J. Jakobsen	4.2%	6 / 155
V	Liberal Party; Venstre	Social liberalism	Centre	Arne Fjørtoft	3.2%	2 / 155

== Campaign ==
=== Slogans ===
Party	Original slogan	English translation
Labour Party	Ny vekst for Norge	New growth for Norway
Conservative Party		
Centre Party		
Christian Democratic Party	La livet leve	Let life live
Liberal Party		
Progress Party	Vi vil gjøre noe med det!	We will do something about it!

=== Debates ===
1985 Norwegian general election debates
Date	Organizers	P Present I Invitee N Non-invitee										
Date	Organizers	Ap	H	KrF	Sv	Frp	Sp	V	Rv	Dlp	NKP	Refs
9 October 1984	NRK	P Gro Harlem Brundtland	P Kåre Willoch	N Kjell Magne Bondevik	N Hanna Kvanmo	N Carl I. Hagen	N Johan J. Jakobsen	N Odd Einar Dørum	N Jorunn Gulbrandsen	N Halfdan Hegtun	N Hans Ingemann Kleven	
6 September 1985	NRK	P Einar Førde, Gro Harlem Brundtland	P Kåre Willoch, Kaci Kullmann Five	P Kjell Magne Bondevik	P Hanna Kvanmo	P Carl I. Hagen	P Johan J. Jakobsen	P Odd Einar Dørum	P Jorunn Gulbrandsen	P Halfdan Hegtun	P Hans Ingemann Kleven	

== Results ==
Party	Votes	%	Seats	+/–
Labour Party	1,061,712	40.81	71	+5
Conservative Party	791,537	30.42	50	–3
Christian Democratic Party	214,969	8.26	16	+1
Centre Party	171,770	6.60	12	+1
Socialist Left Party	141,950	5.46	6	+2
Progress Party	96,797	3.72	2	–2
Liberal Party	81,202	3.12	0	–2
Red Electoral Alliance	14,818	0.57	0	0
Liberal People's Party	12,958	0.50	0	0
Pensioners' Party	7,846	0.30	0	New
Communist Party	4,245	0.16	0	New
Sunnmøre List	2,013	0.08	0	New
Freely Elected Representatives	2,013	0.08	0	0
Society Party	2,013	0.08	0	New
Non-Partisan List	2,013	0.08	0	New
Total	2,601,817	100.00	157	+2
Valid votes	2,601,817	99.86		
Invalid/blank votes	3,619	0.14		
Total votes	2,605,436	100.00		
Registered voters/turnout	3,100,479	84.03		
Source: Nohlen & Stöver

=== Voter demographics ===
Cohort	Percentage of cohort voting for							
Cohort	Ap	H	KrF	Sp	Sv	FrP	V	Others
Total vote	40.8%	30.4%	8.3%	6.6%	5.5%	3.7%	3.12%	
Gender
Females	43.4%	27.6%	10.7%	5.5%	5.7%	2.6%	2.9%	
Males	38.4%	33%	6%	7.6%	5.2%	4.8%	3.2%	
Age
18–30 years old	34.4%	33.9%	5.5%	4.1%	8.6%	7.6%	4.5%	
30-59 years old	40.5%	32%	7.5%	6.6%	5.3%	3%	3.6%	
60 years old and older	47.3%	24.1%	12.6%	8.8%	2.9%	1.5%	0.7%	
Work
low income	44.6%	23.3%	9.3%	8.4%	5.5%	4.4%	2.9%	
Average income	45.5%	26.6%	8.3%	6%	6.5%	2.8%	2.9%	
High income	28.6%	46.5%	6.1%	4.4%	4.4%	4.4%	3.7%	
Education
Primary school	60.2%	16.3%	7.4%	7%	4.4%	3%	1.1%	
High school	38.2%	33.6%	8.6%	6.8%	4.7%	4.6%	2.4%	
University/college	14.8%	44.7%	9.3%	5.8%	9.6%	2.6%	8.7%	
Source: Norwegian Institute for Social Research

=== Seat distribution ===
Constituency	Total seats	Seats won					
Constituency	Total seats	Ap	H	KrF	Sp	SV	Frp
Akershus	12	5	5		1	1	
Aust-Agder	4	2	1	1			
Buskerud	7	4	2		1		
Finnmark	4	3	1				
Hedmark	8	5	1		1	1	
Hordaland	15	5	5	2	1	1	1
Møre og Romsdal	10	4	3	2	1		
Nord-Trøndelag	6	3	1		2		
Nordland	12	6	3	1	1	1	
Oppland	7	5	1		1		
Oslo	15	5	7	1		1	1
Østfold	8	4	3	1			
Rogaland	10	3	4	2	1		
Sogn og Fjordane	5	2	1	1	1		
Sør-Trøndelag	10	4	3	1	1	1	
Telemark	6	3	2	1			
Troms	6	3	2	1			
Vest-Agder	5	2	2	1			
Vestfold	7	3	3	1			
Total	157	71	50	16	12	6	2
Source: Norges Offisielle Statistikk
