= Second Brundtland cabinet =

Government of Norway from 1986 to 1989

Brundtland's Second Cabinet
- Cabinet of Norway

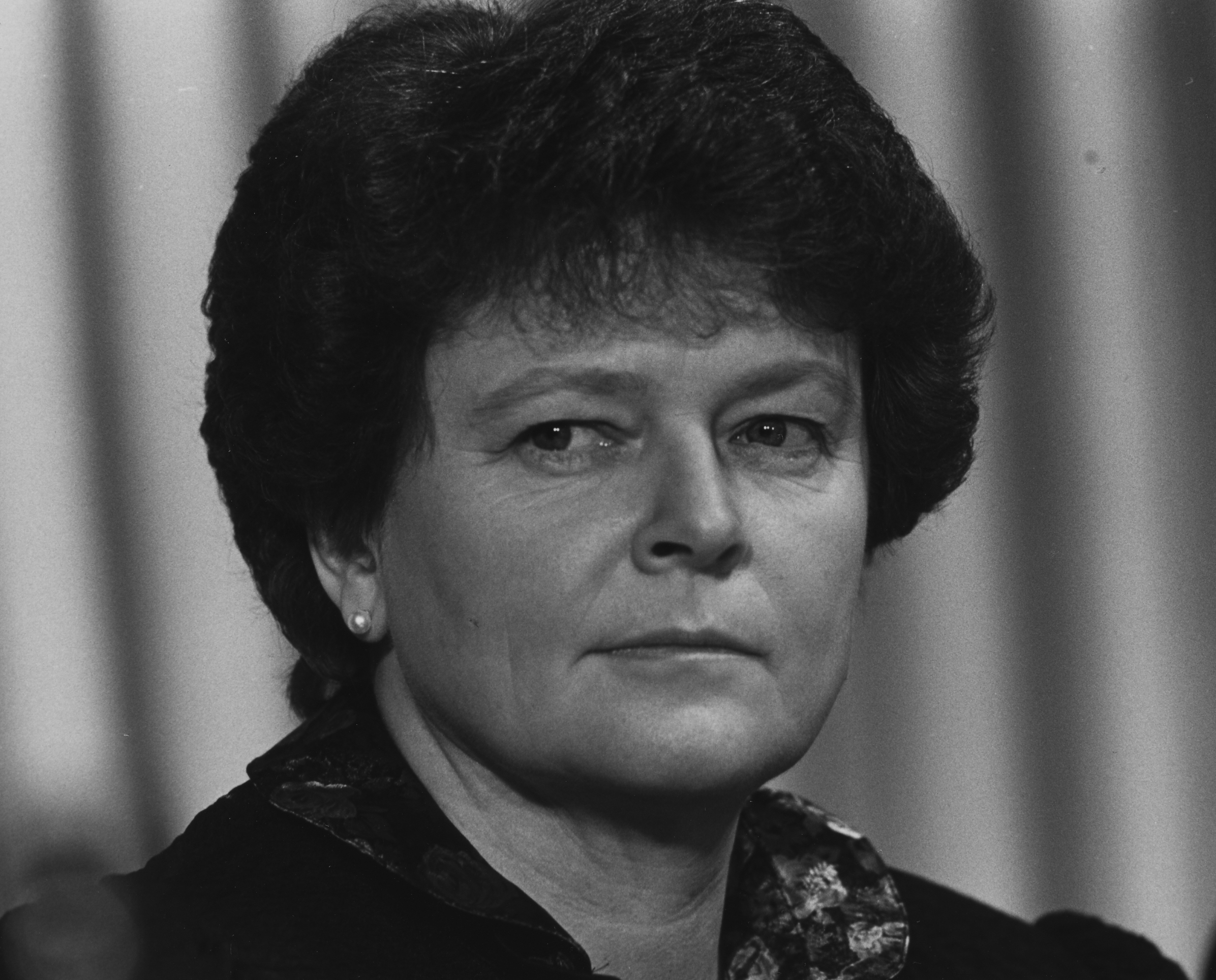
- Date formed: 9 May 1986
- Date dissolved: 16 October 1989

People and organisations
- King: Olav V of Norway
- Prime Minister: Gro Harlem Brundtland
- Ministers removed: 10
- Total no. of members: 28
- Member party: Labour Party
- Status in legislature: Minority government
- Opposition party: Conservative Party

History
- Incoming formation: Motion of no confidence in previous government
- Outgoing formation: 1989 election
- Legislature term: 1985–1989
- Predecessor: Willoch's Second Cabinet
- Successor: Syse's Cabinet

Brundtland's Second Cabinet was a minority, Labour Government of Norway. It succeeded the Conservative Willoch's Second Cabinet, and sat between 9 May 1986 and 16 October 1989. It was replaced by the Conservative/Centre/Christian Democrat cabinet Syse after the 1989 election. The cabinet was historic in that 8 of the 18 members were female, to then the highest female share in a government ever in the world.

== Cabinet members ==
Brundtland's cabinet had the following composition.

Cabinet
Portfolio	Minister	Took office	Left office	Party
Prime Minister	Gro Harlem Brundtland	9 May 1986	16 October 1989	Labour
Minister of Foreign Affairs	Knut Frydenlund (Note: Died in office.)	9 May 1986	26 February 1987 (Note: Johan Jørgen Holst was acting minister from 26 February to 9 March 1987.)	Labour
Minister of Foreign Affairs	Thorvald Stoltenberg	9 March 1987	16 October 1989	Labour
Minister of Finance and Customs	Gunnar Berge	9 May 1986	16 October 1989	Labour
Minister of Defence	Johan Jørgen Holst	9 May 1986	16 October 1989	Labour
Minister of Justice and the Police	Helen Bøsterud	9 May 1986	16 October 1989	Labour
Minister of Transport and Communications	Kjell Borgen	9 May 1986	13 June 1988	Labour
Minister of Transport and Communications	William Engseth	13 June 1988	16 October 1989	Labour
Minister of Local Government and Labour	Leif Haraldseth	9 May 1986	20 February 1987	Labour
Minister of Local Government and Labour	William Engseth	20 February 1987	13 June 1988	Labour
Minister of Local Government and Labour	Kjell Borgen	13 June 1988	16 October 1989	Labour
Minister of Education and Church Affairs	Kirsti Kolle Grøndahl	9 May 1986	13 June 1988	Labour
Minister of Education and Church Affairs	Mary Kvidal	13 June 1988	16 October 1989	Labour
Minister of Culture	Hallvard Bakke	9 May 1986	16 October 1989	Labour
Minister of Social Affairs	Tove S. Gerhardsen	9 May 1986	16 October 1989	Labour
Minister of Agriculture	Gunhild Øyangen	9 May 1986	16 October 1989	Labour
Minister of Industry	Finn Kristensen	9 May 1986	16 October 1989	Labour
Minister of Trade and Shipping	Kurt Mosbakk	9 May 1986	13 June 1988	Labour
Minister of Trade and Shipping	Jan Balstad	13 June 1988	16 October 1989	Labour
Minister of Administration and Consumer Affairs	Anne-Lise Bakken	9 May 1986	13 June 1988	Labour
Minister of Administration and Consumer Affairs	Einfrid Halvorsen	13 June 1988	28 April 1989	Labour
Minister of Administration and Consumer Affairs	Oddrunn Pettersen	28 April 1989	16 October 1989	Labour
Minister of International Development	Vesla Vetlesen	9 May 1986	13 June 1988	Labour
Minister of International Development	Kirsti Kolle Grøndahl	13 June 1988	16 October 1989	Labour
Minister of the Environment	Sissel Rønbeck	9 May 1986	16 October 1989	Labour
Minister of Petroleum and Energy	Arne Øien	9 May 1986	16 October 1989	Labour
Minister of Fisheries; Minister of Nordic Cooperation	Bjarne Mørk-Eidem	9 May 1986	10 October 1989	Labour

== See also ==
- First cabinet Brundtland
- Third cabinet Brundtland
- Norwegian Council of State
- Government of Norway
- List of Norwegian governments

== Notes ==
Preceded by Willoch's second term	Norwegian Council of State; 1986–1989	Succeeded by Premiership of Jon P. Syse
