= Svein Munkejord =

Norwegian politician

Minister of Fisheries
- In office 16 October 1989 – 3 November 1990
- Prime Minister: Jan P. Syse
- Preceded by: Bjarne Mørk-Eidem
- Succeeded by: Oddrunn Pettersen

State Secretary for the Ministry of Fisheries
- In office 1 July 1984 – 4 October 1985
- Prime Minister: Kåre Willoch
- Minister: Thor Listau

Personal details
- Born: Svein Magnus Munkejord; 26 September 1948 (age 77) Kopervik, Rogaland, Norway
- Party: Conservative

Svein Magnus Munkejord (born 26 September 1948) is a Norwegian politician for the Conservative Party. He was personal secretary to the Minister of Fisheries 1981–1983, state secretary to the Minister of Fisheries 1984–1985, and Minister of Fisheries 1989–1990.
