= William Engseth =

Norwegian politician

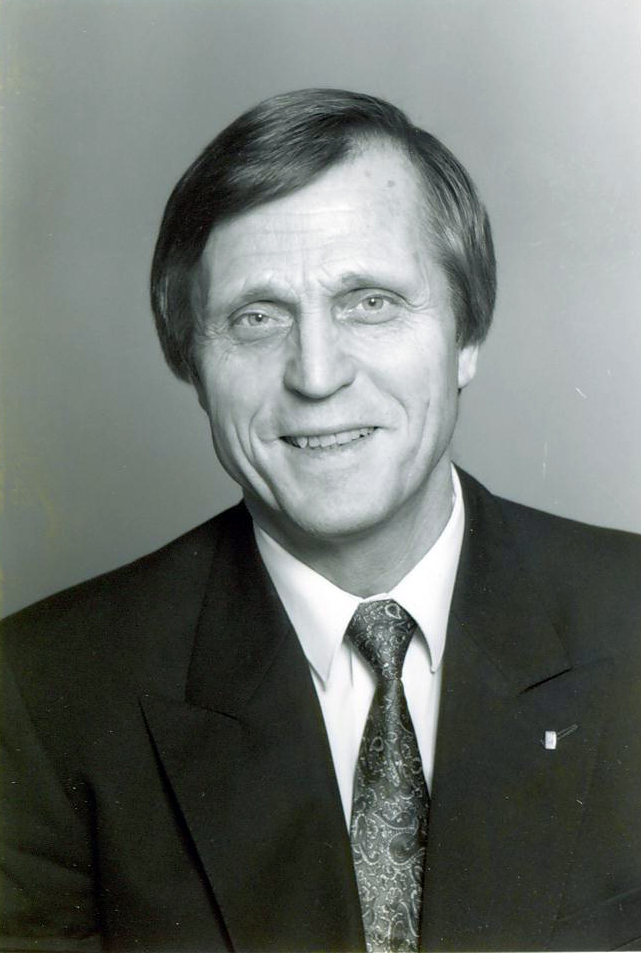

Minister of Transport and Communications
- In office 13 June 1988 – 16 October 1989
- Prime Minister: Gro Harlem Brundtland
- Preceded by: Kjell Borgen
- Succeeded by: Lars Gunnar Lie

Minister of Local Government
- In office 20 February 1987 – 13 June 1988
- Prime Minister: Gro Harlem Brundtland
- Preceded by: Leif Haraldseth
- Succeeded by: Kjell Borgen

Personal details
- Born: 1 August 1933 (age 92) Målselv, Norway
- Party: Labour

William Engseth (born 1 August 1933 in Målselv) is a Norwegian politician for the Labour Party. He was appointed Minister of Local Government Affairs in 1987, and in 1988 he became Minister of Transport and Communications 1988–1989. In 1989 he was elected as a member of the Norwegian Parliament from Troms and held the seat to 1997.

From 1990 to 1994 he was president of the Norwegian Olympic and Paralympic Committee and Confederation of Sports.

Political offices
| Preceded by Leif Haraldseth | Norwegian Minister of Local Government; 1987–1988 | Succeeded by Kjell Borgen |
| Preceded by Kjell Borgen | Norwegian Minister of Transport and Communications; 1988–1989 | Succeeded by Lars Gunnar Lie |
