= Third Brundtland cabinet =

Government of Norway from 1990 to 1996

Brundtland's Third Cabinet
- Cabinet of Norway

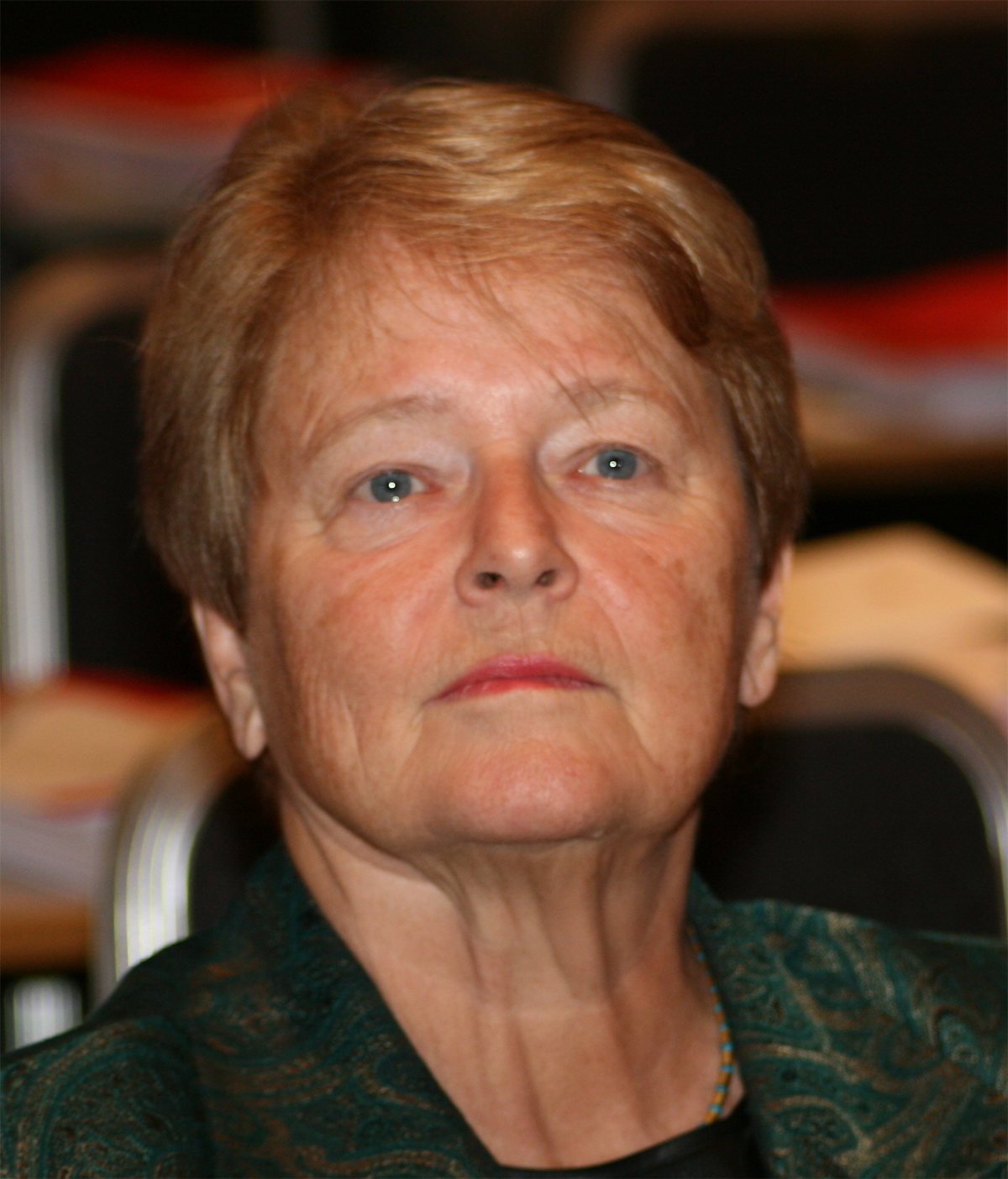
- Date formed: 3 November 1990
- Date dissolved: 25 October 1996

People and organisations
- King: Olav V of Norway; Harald V of Norway
- Prime Minister: Gro Harlem Brundtland
- Ministers removed: 17
- Total no. of members: 39
- Member party: Labour Party
- Status in legislature: Minority government
- Opposition parties: Conservative Party; Progress Party; Christian Democratic Party

History
- Election: 1993 parliamentary election
- Legislature terms: 1989-1993; 1993-1997
- Predecessor: Syse's Cabinet
- Successor: Jagland's Cabinet

Brundtland's Third Cabinet was a minority, Labour Government of Norway. It succeeded the H-Sp-KrF Cabinet Syse, and sat between 3 November 1990 and 25 October 1996. It was replaced by the Labour Cabinet Jagland. The cabinet was active during two parliaments, both 1989–93 and 1993–97. Brundtlands third cabinet had the following composition.

== Cabinet members ==
Cabinet
Portfolio	Minister	Took office	Left office	Party
Prime Minister	Gro Harlem Brundtland	3 November 1990	25 October 1996	Labour
Minister of Foreign Affairs	Thorvald Stoltenberg	3 November 1990	2 April 1993	Labour
Minister of Foreign Affairs	Johan Jørgen Holst	2 April 1993	13 January 1994 (Note: Died in office.)	Labour
Minister of Foreign Affairs	Bjørn Tore Godal	24 January 1994	25 October 1996	Labour
Minister of Finance and Customs	Sigbjørn Johnsen	3 November 1990	25 October 1996	Labour
Minister of Defence	Johan Jørgen Holst	3 November 1990	2 April 1993	Labour
Minister of Defence	Jørgen Kosmo	2 April 1993	25 October 1996	Labour
Minister of Justice and the Police	Kari Gjesteby	3 November 1990	4 September 1992	Labour
Minister of Justice and the Police	Grete Faremo	4 September 1992	25 October 1996	Labour
Minister of Transport and Communications	Kjell Opseth	3 November 1990	25 October 1996	Labour
Minister of Local Government; Minister of Nordic Cooperation	Kjell Borgen	3 November 1990	4 September 1992	Labour
Minister of Local Government; Minister of Nordic Cooperation	Gunnar Berge	4 September 1992	25 October 1996	Labour
Minister of Education and Research	Gudmund Hernes	3 November 1990	22 December 1995	Labour
Minister of Education and Research	Reidar Sandal	22 December 1995	25 October 1996	Labour
Minister of Culture	Åse Kleveland	3 November 1990	25 October 1996	Labour
Minister of Health	Werner Christie	4 September 1992	22 December 1995	Labour
Minister of Health	Gudmund Hernes	22 December 1995	25 October 1996	Labour
Minister of Social Affairs	Tove Veierød	3 November 1990	4 September 1992	Labour
Minister of Social Affairs	Grete Knudsen	4 September 1992	24 January 1994	Labour
Minister of Social Affairs	Hill-Marta Solberg	24 January 1994	25 October 1996	Labour
Minister of Children and Family Affairs	Matz Sandman	3 November 1990	15 November 1991	Labour
Minister of Children and Family Affairs	Grete Berget	15 November 1991	25 October 1996	Labour
Minister of Agriculture	Gunhild Øyangen	3 November 1990	25 October 1996	Labour
Minister of Industry (Note: Industry and Energy from 1993 to 1996.)	Ole Knapp	3 November 1990	4 September 1992	Labour
Minister of Industry	Finn Kristensen	4 September 1992	7 October 1993	Labour
Minister of Industry	Jens Stoltenberg	7 October 1993	25 October 1996	Labour
Minister of Trade and Shipping	Eldrid Nordbø	3 November 1990	15 November 1991	Labour
Minister of Trade and Shipping	Bjørn Tore Godal	15 November 1991	24 January 1994	Labour
Minister of Trade and Shipping	Grete Knudsen	24 January 1994	25 October 1996	Labour
Minister of Government Administration and Labour	Tove S. Gerhardsen	3 November 1990	4 September 1992	Labour
Minister of Government Administration and Labour	Oddny Aleksandersen	4 September 1992	7 October 1993	Labour
Minister of Government Administration and Labour	Nils Olav Totland	7 October 1993	25 October 1996	Labour
Minister of International Development	Grete Faremo	3 November 1990	4 September 1992	Labour
Minister of International Development	Kari Nordheim-Larsen	4 September 1992	25 October 1996	Labour
Minister of the Environment	Thorbjørn Berntsen	3 November 1990	25 October 1996	Labour
Minister of Petroleum and Energy	Finn Kristensen	3 November 1990	31 December 1992	Labour
Minister of Fisheries	Oddrun Pettersen	3 November 1990	4 September 1992	Labour
Minister of Fisheries	Jan Henry T. Olsen	4 September 1992	25 October 1996	Labour

== See also ==
- First cabinet Brundtland
- Second cabinet Brundtland
- Norwegian Council of State
- Government of Norway
- List of Norwegian governments

== Notes ==
Preceded by Premiership of Jon P. Syse	Norwegian Council of State; 1990–1996	Succeeded by Premiership of Thorbjørn Jagland
