= Kirsten Myklevoll =

Norwegian politician

Kirsten Elise Myklevoll (25 September 1928 – 11 December 1996) was a Norwegian politician for the Labour Party. She was Minister of Administration and Consumer Affairs 1978–1979. She was a member of the Parliament of Norway for Troms 1973–81 and county mayor of Troms 1986–91.
