= Oddrunn Pettersen =

Norwegian politician

Minister of Fisheries
- In office 3 November 1990 – 4 September 1992
- Prime Minister: Gro Harlem Brundtland
- Preceded by: Svein Munkejord
- Succeeded by: Jan Henry T. Olsen

Minister of Administration and Consumer Affairs
- In office 28 April 1989 – 16 October 1989
- Prime Minister: Gro Harlem Brundtland
- Preceded by: Einfrid Halvorsen
- Succeeded by: Solveig Sollie

Chair of the Standing Committee on Transport
- In office 23 October 1985 – 28 April 1989
- Preceded by: Kjell Borgen
- Succeeded by: Solveig Torsvik

Member of the Norwegian Parliament
- In office 1 October 1977 – 30 September 1993
- Constituency: Finnmark

Personal details
- Born: Oddrunn Kristine Helene Pettersen; 5 March 1937 Hadsel, Nordland, Norway
- Died: 30 November 2002 (aged 65) Kirkenes, Finnmark, Norway
- Party: Labour
- Spouse: Birger Pettersen (m. 1961)

Oddrunn Kristine Helene Pettersen (5 March 1937 – 30 November 2002) was a Norwegian politician for the Labour Party who served as Minister of Administration and Consumer Affairs from April to October 1989, and Minister of Fisheries from 1990 to 1992.

Political offices
Preceded by Kjell Borgen	Chair of the Standing Committee on Transport; 1985–1989	Succeeded by Solveig Torsvik
