= Lars Gunnar Lie =

Norwegian politician (1938–2025)

Minister of Transport and Communications
- In office 16 October 1989 – 3 November 1990
- Prime Minister: Jan P. Syse
- Preceded by: William Engseth
- Succeeded by: Kjell Opseth

Member of the Norwegian Parliament
- In office 1 October 1985 – 30 September 2001
- Constituency: Sogn og Fjordane

Mayor of Førde Municipality
- In office 1 January 1982 – 31 December 1983
- Preceded by: Helge Barstad
- Succeeded by: Sverre Øygard

Personal details
- Born: 18 September 1938 Fjell Municipality, Hordaland, Norway
- Died: 18 April 2025 (aged 86)
- Party: Christian Democratic

Lars Gunnar Lie (18 September 1938 – 18 April 2025) was a Norwegian politician from the Christian Democratic Party and was the Minister of Transport and Communications 1989–1990.

Lie died on 18 April 2025, at the age of 86.

Political offices
Preceded by William Engseth	Norwegian Minister of Transport and Communications; 1989–1990	Succeeded by Kjell Opseth
