= Johan J. Jakobsen =

Norwegian politician

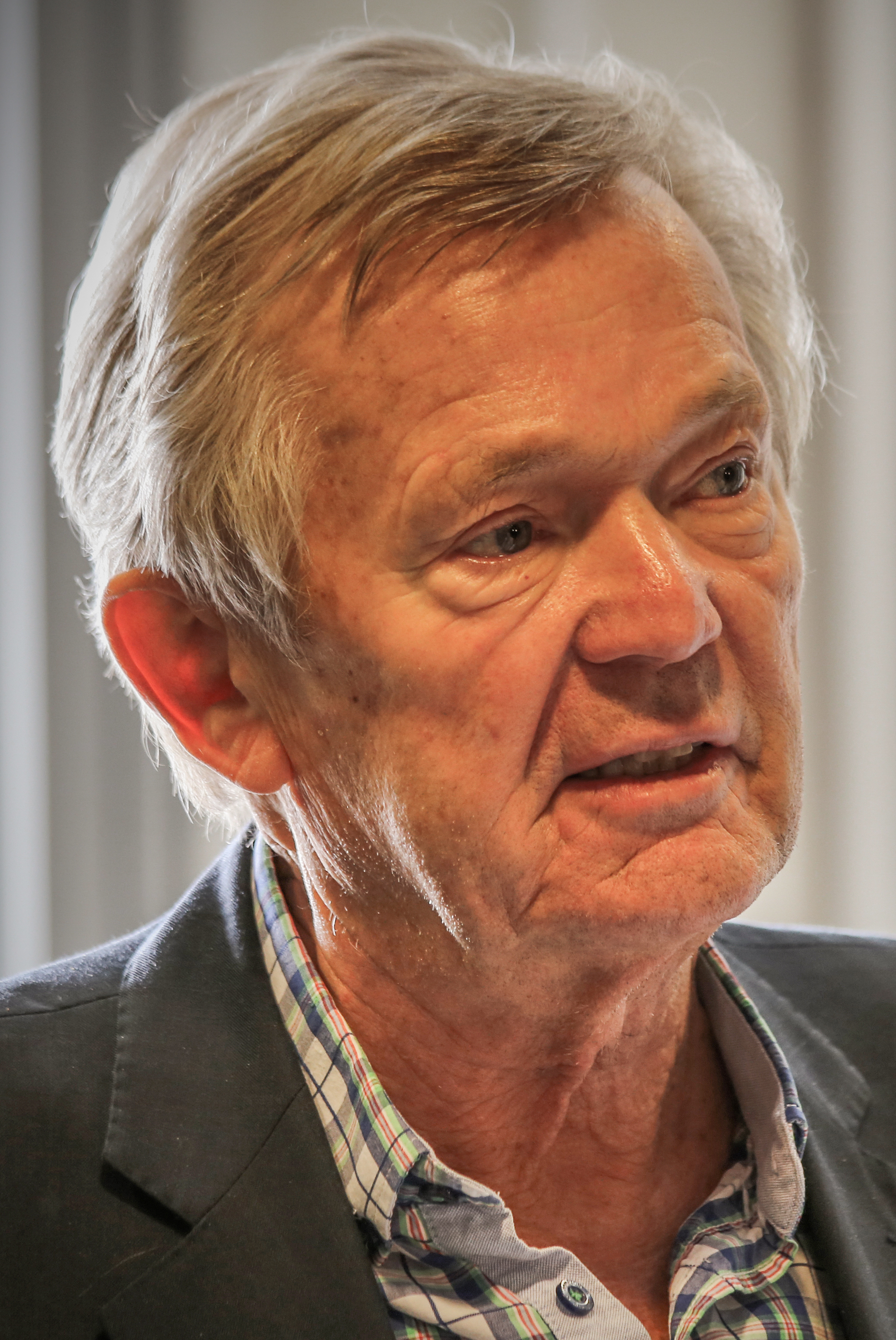
- Jakobsen in 2015.

Minister of Local Government
- In office 16 October 1989 – 3 November 1990
- Prime Minister: Jan P. Syse
- Preceded by: Kjell Borgen
- Succeeded by: Kjell Borgen

Minister of Transport and Communications
- In office 8 June 1983 – 9 May 1986
- Prime Minister: Kåre Willoch
- Preceded by: Inger Koppernæs
- Succeeded by: Kjell Borgen

Leader of the Centre Party
- In office 1 April 1979 – 31 March 1991
- Preceded by: Gunnar Stålsett
- Succeeded by: Anne Enger

Member of the Norwegian Parliament
- In office 1 October 1973 – 30 September 2001
- Constituency: Nord-Trøndelag

Personal details
- Born: Johan Jakob Jakobsen; 15 April 1937 Namsos, Norway
- Died: 30 June 2018 (aged 81) Bærum, Norway
- Party: Centre

Johan Jakob Jakobsen (15 April 1937 – 30 June 2018) was a Norwegian politician, member of the Norwegian Centre Party.

He had a long political career, sitting seven terms as a representative in the Norwegian Parliament, first elected in 1973. This run was not entirely successive, however, as he was a member of two different cabinets in the 1980s. On 8 June 1983 (in the middle of a term), he was assigned to the Kåre Willoch's centre-right coalition government, with Jakobsen leading the Ministry of Transport and Communications. This government lasted until 1986. After the 1989 elections, the coalition was once again able to form a government; this time led by Prime Minister Jan P. Syse. Jakobsen was Minister of Local Government. The rest of his political career, from which he stepped down in 2001, he was a member of parliament.

In addition, he was chairman of the Centre Party from 1979 to 1991. Together with Per Borten, he is the longest-serving party leader. He was also a noted opponent of Norway joining the European Union.

Jakobsen has written one book, titled Mot Strømmen (Against the Grain in English).

Party political offices
| Preceded by Gunnar Stålsett | Chairman of the Norwegian Centre Party; 1979–1991 | Succeeded by Anne Enger Lahnstein |
Political offices
| Preceded by Inger Koppernæs | Norwegian Minister of Transport and Communications; 1983–1986 | Succeeded by Kjell Borgen |
| Preceded by Kjell Borgen | Norwegian Minister of Local Government; 1989–1990 | Succeeded by Kjell Borgen |
