= Minister of Defence (Norway) =

Head of the Norwegian Ministry of Defence

The Norwegian Minister of Defence is the head of the Norwegian Ministry of Defence. The position has existed since 1814. The incumbent minister since 4 February 2025 is Tore O. Sandvik of the Labour Party.

Between 1819 and 1885 the Ministry was split into two different ministries, the Ministry of the Navy and the Army Ministry.

Norwegian defence ministers after 1945

== List of Norwegian Ministers of Defence (1814–1885) ==
Name	From	To
The position was named Chief of 6th Ministry from 1814 to 1818
Diderik Hegermann	1814	1816
Peter Motzfeldt	1816	1818
Mathias Sommerhielm	1818	1819
The position was named Minister of the Army from 1818 to 1885
Jonas Collett	1819	1819
Nicolai Krog	1822	1825
Jørgen Herman Vogt	1825	1826
Nicolai Krog	1826	1828
Thomas Fasting	1828	1829
Nicolai Krog	1839	1832
Thomas Fasting	1832	1833
Nicolai Krog	1833	1835
Valentin Sibbern	1835	1836
Nicolai Krog	1836	1837
Palle Rømer Fleischer	1837	1839
Oluf Borch de Schouboe	1839	1839
Valentin Sibbern	1839	1840
Palle Rømer Fleischer	1840	1842
Oluf Borch de Schouboe	1842	1843
Palle Rømer Fleischer	1843	1846
Valentin Sibbern	1846	1847
Palle Rømer Fleischer	1847	1848
Thomas Edvard von Westen Sylow	1848	1851
Hans Christian Petersen	1851	1852
Ole Wilhelm Erichsen	1852	1852
Hans Christian Petersen	1852	1853
Thomas Edvard von Westen Sylow	1852	1853
Hans Glad Bloch	1853	1856
Hans Christian Petersen	1856	1857
Harald Wergeland (acting)	1857	1857
Hans Christian Petersen	1857	1857
Hans Glad Bloch	1857	1860
Harald Wergeland	1860	1862
August Christian Manthey	1862	1863
Harald Wergeland	1863	1866
August Christian Manthey	1866	1867
Harald Wergeland	1867	1868
Niels Christian Irgens	1868	1872
August Christian Manthey	1872	1872
Lorentz Henrik Müller Segelcke	1872	1874
Christian Selmer	1874	1875
Anders Sandøe Ørsted Bull (acting)	1875	1875
Christian Selmer	1875	1875
Anders Sandøe Ørsted Bull (acting)	1875	1875
Lorentz Henrik Müller Segelcke	1875	1877
Adolph Frederik Munthe	1877	1879
Christian Selmer	1879	1880
Adolph Frederik Munthe	1880	1881
Anders Sandøe Ørsted Bull (acting)	1881	1881
Adolph Frederik Munthe	1881	1884
Anders Sandøe Ørsted Bull (acting)	1884	1884
Lars Christian Dahll	1884	1884
Ludvig Daae	1884	1885
The position was named Minister of Defence from 1885 to present

== Ministers of Defence (1885–present) ==
=== Key ===
Christian Democratic Party
Conservative Party
Centre Party
Coalition Party
Free-minded Liberal Party
Independent
Labour Party
Liberal Party

=== Ministers ===
Photo	Name	Party	Took office	Left office	Tenure	Cabinet
	Johan Sverdrup	Liberal	1 September 1885	13 July 1889	3 years, 315 days	Sverdrup
	Edvard Hans Hoff	Conservative	13 July 1889	6 March 1891	1 year, 236 days	Stang I
	Peter T. Holst	Liberal	6 March 1891	2 May 1893	2 years, 57 days	Steen I
	Wilhelm Olssøn	Conservative	2 May 1893	15 July 1894	1 year, 74 days	Stang II
	Johannes Harbitz	Conservative	15 July 1894	27 April 1895	286 days	Stang II
	Wilhelm Olssøn	Conservative	27 April 1895	17 February 1898	2 years, 296 days	Stang II; Hagerup I
	Peter T. Holst	Liberal	17 February 1898	6 November 1900	2 years, 262 days	Steen II
	Georg Stang	Liberal	6 November 1900	9 June 1903	2 years, 215 days	Steen II; Blehr I
	Thomas Heftye	Liberal	9 June 1903	22 October 1903	135 days	Blehr I
	Oscar Strugstad	Coalition	22 October 1903	11 March 1905	1 year, 140 days	Hagerup II
	Wilhelm Olssøn	Conservative	11 March 1905	25 May 1907	2 years, 75 days	Michelsen
	Karl Friedrich Griffin Dawes	Liberal	23 October 1907	19 March 1908	148 days	Løvland
	Thomas Heftye	Liberal	19 March 1908	11 April 1908	23 days	Knudsen I
	Haakon D. Lowzow	Liberal	11 April 1908	20 August 1909	1 year, 131 days	Knudsen I
	August Spørck	Liberal	20 August 1909	2 February 1910	166 days	Knudsen I
	Karl Bull	Conservative	2 February 1910	20 February 1912	2 years, 18 days	Konow
	Jens Bratlie	Conservative	20 February 1912	31 January 1913	346 days	Bratlie
	Hans Vilhelm Keilhau	Liberal	31 January 1913	8 August 1914	1 year, 189 days	Knudsen II
	Christian T. Holtfodt	Liberal	8 August 1914	20 February 1919	4 years, 196 days	Knudsen II
	Rudolf Peersen	Liberal	20 February 1919	17 June 1919	117 days	Knudsen II
	Ivar Aavatsmark	Liberal	17 June 1919	21 June 1920	1 year, 4 days	Knudsen II
	Karl Wilhelm Wefring	Free-minded Liberal	21 June 1920	22 June 1921	1 year, 1 day	Bahr Halvorsen I
	Ivar Aavatsmark	Liberal	22 June 1921	6 March 1923	1 year, 257 days	Blehr II
	Karl Wilhelm Wefring	Free-minded Liberal	6 March 1923	25 July 1924	1 year, 141 days	Bahr Halvorsen II; Berge
	Rolf Jacobsen	Liberal	25 July 1924	5 March 1926	1 year, 223 days	Mowinckel I
	Karl Wilhelm Wefring	Free-minded Liberal	5 March 1926	26 July 1926	143 days	Lykke
	Ingolf Elster Christensen	Conservative	26 July 1926	28 January 1928	1 year, 186 days	Lykke
	Fredrik Monsen	Labour	28 January 1928	15 February 1928	18 days	Hornsrud
	Torgeir Anderssen-Rysst	Liberal	28 January 1928	12 May 1931	3 years, 104 days	Mowinckel II
	Vidkun Quisling	Independent	12 May 1931	3 March 1933	1 year, 295 days	Kolstad; Hundseid
	Jens Isak Kobro	Liberal	3 March 1933	20 March 1935	2 years, 17 days	Mowinckel III
	Fredrik Monsen	Labour	20 March 1935	22 December 1939	4 years, 277 days	Nygaardsvold
	Birger Ljungberg	Conservative	22 December 1939	20 March 1942	2 years, 88 days	Nygaardsvold
	Oscar Torp	Labour	20 March 1942	5 November 1945	3 years, 230 days	Nygaardsvold; Gerhardsen I
	Jens Christian Hauge	Labour	5 November 1945	5 January 1952	6 years, 61 days	Gerhardsen II; Torp
	Nils Langhelle	Labour	5 January 1952	15 June 1954	2 years, 161 days	Torp
	Kai Birger Knudsen	Labour	15 June 1954	22 January 1955	221 days	Torp
	Nils Handal	Labour	22 January 1955	18 February 1961	6 years, 27 days	Gerhardsen III
	Gudmund Harlem	Labour	18 February 1961	28 August 1963	2 years, 191 days	Gerhardsen III
	Håkon Kyllingmark	Conservative	28 August 1963	25 September 1963	28 days	Lyng
	Gudmund Harlem	Labour	25 September 1963	12 October 1965	2 years, 17 days	Gerhardsen IV
	Otto Grieg Tidemand	Conservative	12 October 1965	5 June 1970	4 years, 236 days	Borten
	Gunnar Hellesen	Conservative	5 June 1970	17 March 1971	285 days	Borten
	Alv Jakob Fostervoll	Labour	17 March 1971	18 October 1972	1 year, 215 days	Bratteli I
	Johan Kleppe	Liberal	18 October 1972	16 October 1973	363 days	Korvald
	Alv Jakob Fostervoll	Labour	16 October 1973	15 January 1976	2 years, 91 days	Bratteli II
	Rolf Arthur Hansen	Labour	15 January 1976	8 October 1979	3 years, 266 days	Nordli
	Thorvald Stoltenberg	Labour	8 October 1979	14 October 1981	2 years, 6 days	Nordli; Brundtland I
	Anders C. Sjaastad	Conservative	14 October 1981	25 April 1986	4 years, 193 days	Willoch I-II
	Rolf Presthus	Conservative	25 April 1986	9 May 1986	14 days	Willoch II
	Johan Jørgen Holst	Labour	9 May 1986	16 October 1989	3 years, 160 days	Brundtland II
	Per Ditlev-Simonsen	Conservative	16 October 1989	3 November 1990	1 year, 18 days	Syse
	Johan Jørgen Holst	Labour	3 November 1990	2 April 1993	2 years, 150 days	Brundtland III
	Jørgen Kosmo	Labour	2 April 1993	17 October 1997	4 years, 198 days	Brundtland III; Jagland
	Dag Jostein Fjærvoll	Christian Democratic	17 October 1997	15 March 1999	1 year, 149 days	Bondevik I
	Eldbjørg Løwer	Liberal	15 March 1999	17 March 2000	1 year, 2 days	Bondevik I
	Bjørn Tore Godal	Labour	17 March 2000	19 October 2001	1 year, 216 days	Stoltenberg I
	Kristin Krohn Devold	Conservative	19 October 2001	17 October 2005	3 years, 363 days	Bondevik II
	Anne-Grete Strøm-Erichsen	Labour	17 October 2005	20 October 2009	4 years, 3 days	Stoltenberg II
	Grete Faremo	Labour	20 October 2009	11 November 2011	2 years, 22 days	Stoltenberg II
	Espen Barth Eide	Labour	11 November 2011	21 September 2012	315 days	Stoltenberg II
	Anne-Grete Strøm-Erichsen	Labour	21 September 2012	16 October 2013	1 year, 25 days	Stoltenberg II
	Ine Eriksen Søreide	Conservative	16 October 2013	20 October 2017	4 years, 4 days	Solberg
	Frank Bakke-Jensen	Conservative	20 October 2017	14 October 2021	3 years, 359 days	Solberg
	Odd Roger Enoksen	Centre	14 October 2021	12 April 2022	180 days	Støre
	Bjørn Arild Gram	Centre	12 April 2022	4 February 2025	2 years, 298 days	Støre
	Tore O. Sandvik	Labour	4 February 2025	present	1 year, 10 days	Støre
