= Minister of the Navy and Postal Affairs =

The Norwegian Minister of Navy and Postal Affairs was the head of the Norwegian Ministry of Navy and Postal Affairs. The position existed from 1815 to 1885, but was officially named Minister of the Navy and Postal Affairs only from 1861.

In 1861, the Ministry of Postal Affairs merged with the Ministry of the Navy, and the resulting Ministry of the Navy and Postal Affairs was regarded its direct successor. Prior to this, the ministry had been known under various other names.

== List of Norwegian Ministers of Navy and Postal Affairs ==
In 1815, the ministry was named the 7th Ministry.

Name	From	To
Thomas Fasting	1815	1817
Jens Schou Fabricius (acting)	1817	1818
Thomas Fasting	1818	1820
In 1818, it had been renamed the Ministry of the Naval Service.
Jonas Collett	1820	1820
Mathias Sommerhielm	1820	1821
Thomas Fasting	1821	1824
Poul Christian Holst	1824	1825
Thomas Fasting	1825	1826
Hans Hagerup Falbe	1826	1827
Thomas Fasting	1827	1830
Nicolai Krog	1830	1831
Thomas Fasting	1831	1833
Nicolai Krog	1833	1834
Thomas Fasting	1834	1836
Nicolai Krog	1836	1836
Thomas Fasting	1836	1839
Hans Christian Petersen	1839	1840
Valentin Sibbern	1840	1841
Hans Christian Petersen	1841	1843
Valentin Sibbern	1843	1844
Hans Christian Petersen	1844	1845
Henrich Herman Mejer Foss	1845	1848
In 1846, it had been renamed the Ministry of the Navy.
Ole Wilhelm Erichsen	1848	1852
Hans Christian Petersen	1852	1852
Niels Andreas Thrap (acting)	1852	1853
Hans Christian Petersen	1853	1853
Thomas Edvard von Westen Sylow	1853	1853
Ole Wilhelm Erichsen	1853	1856
Henrik Steffens Hagerup	1856	1857
Hans Christian Petersen	1857	1857
Henrik Steffens Hagerup	1857	1857
Hans Christian Petersen	1857	1858
Henrik Steffens Hagerup	1858	1859
Hans Christian Petersen	1859	1860
Jacob Worm Skjelderup (acting)	1860	1860
Ketil Motzfeldt	1860	1860
Harald Nicolai Storm Wergeland	1860	1861
In 1861, it was renamed the Ministry of the Navy and Postal Affairs.
Ketil Motzfeldt	1861	1861
August Christian Manthey	1861	1861
Wolfgang Wenzel von Haffner	1861	1863
Erik Røring Møinichen	1863	1864
Wolfgang Wenzel von Haffner	1864	1867
August Christian Manthey	1867	1868
Wolfgang Wenzel von Haffner	1868	1869
Ole Jacob Broch	1869	1871
Johan Collett Falsen	1871	1871
August Christian Manthey	1871	1872
Ole Jacob Broch	1872	1872
August Christian Manthey	1872	1872
Jacob Lerche Johansen	1872	1873
August Christian Manthey	1873	1874
Jacob Lerche Johansen	1874	1877
Jens Holmboe	1877	1878
Jacob Lerche Johansen	1878	1881
Jens Holmboe	1881	1882
Jacob Lerche Johansen	1882	1884
Halfdan Lehman (acting)	1884	1884
Carsten Tank Nielsen (acting)	1884	1884
Halfdan Lehman (acting)	1884	1884
Bøicke Johan Rulffs Koren	1884	1884
Johan Sverdrup	1884	1885
