= Keilhau =

Keilhau is a surname. Notable people with the surname include:

- Carl Keilhau (1919–1957), Norwegian journalist and poet
- Hans Vilhelm Keilhau (1845–1917), Norwegian artillery officer and politician
- Louise Keilhau (1860–1927), Norwegian teacher and peace activist
- Wilhelm Keilhau (1888–1954), Norwegian historian and economist
- Wollert Keilhau (1894–1958), Norwegian librarian and encyclopedist
