= Riddervold =

Riddervold is a Norwegian surname. Notable people with the surname include:

- Astri Riddervold (1925–2019), Norwegian chemist and ethnologist
- Catharine Riddervold Wernicke (1798–1862), Danish pianist
- Hans Riddervold (1795–1876), Norwegian politician
- Hans Huitfeldt Riddervold (1927–1980), Norwegian businessman
- Hans Julius Riddervold (1901–1986), Norwegian media executive
- Jeppe Riddervold, Danish songwriter and music publisher
- Marianne Riddervold (born 1980), Norwegian orienteer
- Nils Riddervold Jensen (1863–1938), Norwegian educator and politician
