= Hans Riddervold (disambiguation) =

Hans Riddervold may refer to:

- Hans Riddervold (1795–1876), Norwegian politician
- Hans Huitfeldt Riddervold (1927–1980), Norwegian businessman
- Hans Julius Riddervold (1901–1986), Norwegian media executive
