= Christian Fleischer =

Danish civil servant

Chief auditor in the naval administration
- Incumbent
- Assumed office 1740s

Member of Collegium of the Admiralty
- Incumbent
- Assumed office 1754

Commissariat-General
- Incumbent
- Assumed office 1754

Head of naval etat
- Incumbent
- Assumed office 1767 (acting since 1763)

Personal details
- Born: 10 August 1713
- Died: 21 March 1768 (aged 54)
- Parent: Herman Reinhold Fleischer (father)
- Relatives: Baltzer Fleischer (brother); Palle Rømer Fleischer (great nephew)
- Occupation: Private tutor; Civil servant
- Scientific career
- Known for: Sorøske Samlinger; Schleswiger Litteraturbriefe
- Fields: Language studies

Christian Fleischer (10 August 1713 – 21 March 1768) was a Danish civil servant in the naval administration.

He was a son of Herman Reinhold Fleischer (1656–1712). His father died before he was born, but several of his uncles had notable careers in Norway. Baltzer Fleischer was his brother, thus Christian Fleischer was a great uncle of Palle Rømer Fleischer. The family had roots in Elbing, East Prussia.

He took education from 1730 to 1733, and was then hired as a private tutor for Count Ulrik Adolf Danneskjold-Samsøe (da:Ulrik Adolph Danneskiold-Samsøe). He would serve the Count in his later professional life. He was a secretary and chief auditor in the naval administration in the 1740s. In 1754, he became the only non-noble member of the Collegium of the Admiralty and Commissariat-General. He headed the naval etat from 1767 (acting since 1763).

He also contributed in language studies. He wrote the piece Forsøg til Sprogets Forbedring i Henseende til enstydige og ubestemte Ord in the work Sorøske Samlinger, which he released in 1765 together with Gerstenberg and Kleen. He also contributed to Schleswiger Litteraturbriefe in 1766 and 1767. He also befriended Morten Thrane Brünnich, and a bird collection of Fleischer's helped Brünnich write his Ornithologia Borealis in 1764.

He died in March 1768.
