= Henrik Steffens Hagerup =

Norwegian politician

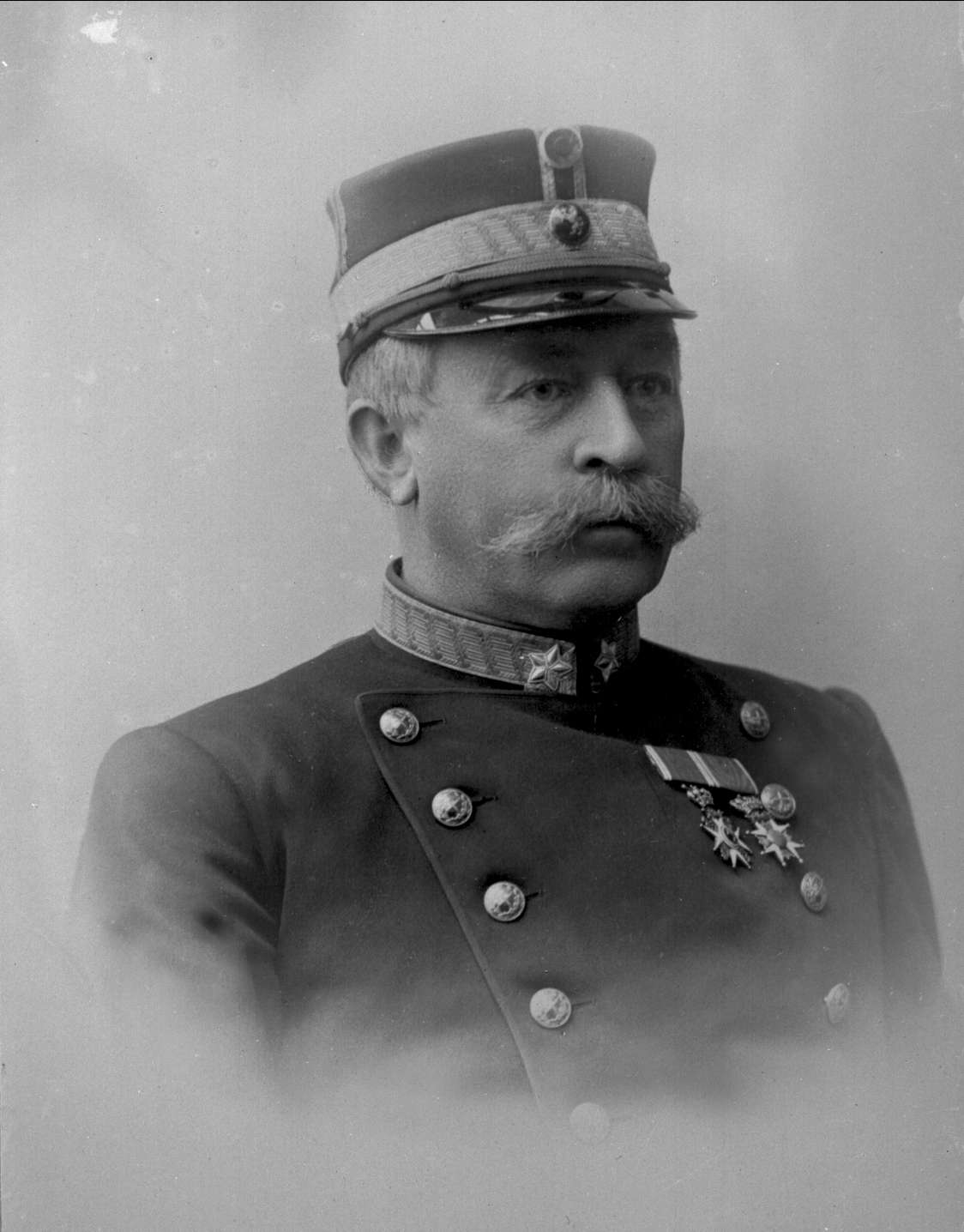
Henrik Steffens Hagerup

Henrik Steffens Hagerup (23 April 1806 – 29 May 1859) was a Norwegian naval officer and politician who served as Minister of the Navy from 1856 to 1859 with certain interruptions.

== Biography ==
He was born in Calundborg, Denmark, where his father was stationed as a town clerk (byskriver). He was enrolled at the naval academy in Fredriksværn, and graduated in 1824. He studied at the University of Breslau in 1825 and 1826 before returning to Norway. He lived in Trondhjem for some time, but moved back to Fredriksværn in 1837. In 1854 he had reached the rank of Captain.

He was elected to the Norwegian Parliament in 1848, 1851 and 1854, representing the rural constituency of Jarlsberg og Laurviks Amt, of which Fredriksværn was a part.

In 1856 he was promoted to the rank of counter admiral, as well as being appointed Minister of the Navy on 31 March. On 14 September 1857 he left this position temporarily, as he was appointed member of the Council of State Division in interim in Stockholm, founded during King Oscar I's illness. He was replaced by Hans Christian Petersen. The interim government lasted until late September, and Hagerup returned as Minister of the Navy on 1 October 1857. He held this position until May 1859, interrupted by a spell as member of the Council of State Division in Stockholm from 15 October 1857 to 1 September 1858. He was succeeded by Hans Christian Petersen.

== Personal life ==
Henrik Steffens Hagerup was the son of Caspar Peter Hagerup and Ulrikke Eleonore Steffens, sister of philosopher Henrik Steffens. He married Nicoline Christine Jenssen (1808–1862), a daughter of Matz Jenssen and sister of Jens Nicolai Jenssen, in 1830. Their son George Francis Hagerup would become Prime Minister.

Henrik Steffens Hagerup was a member of the Royal Norwegian Society of Sciences and Letters, and was awarded various Royal Orders. He died in 1859 in Carlsbad.

Political offices
Preceded by Ole Wilhelm Erichsen	Minister of the Navy; 1856–1857	Succeeded by Hans Christian Petersen
Preceded by Hans Christian Petersen	Minister of the Navy; October 1857	Succeeded by Hans Christian Petersen
Preceded by Hans Christian Petersen	Minister of the Navy; 1858–1859	Succeeded by Hans Christian Petersen
