= August Christian Manthey =

Norwegian minister

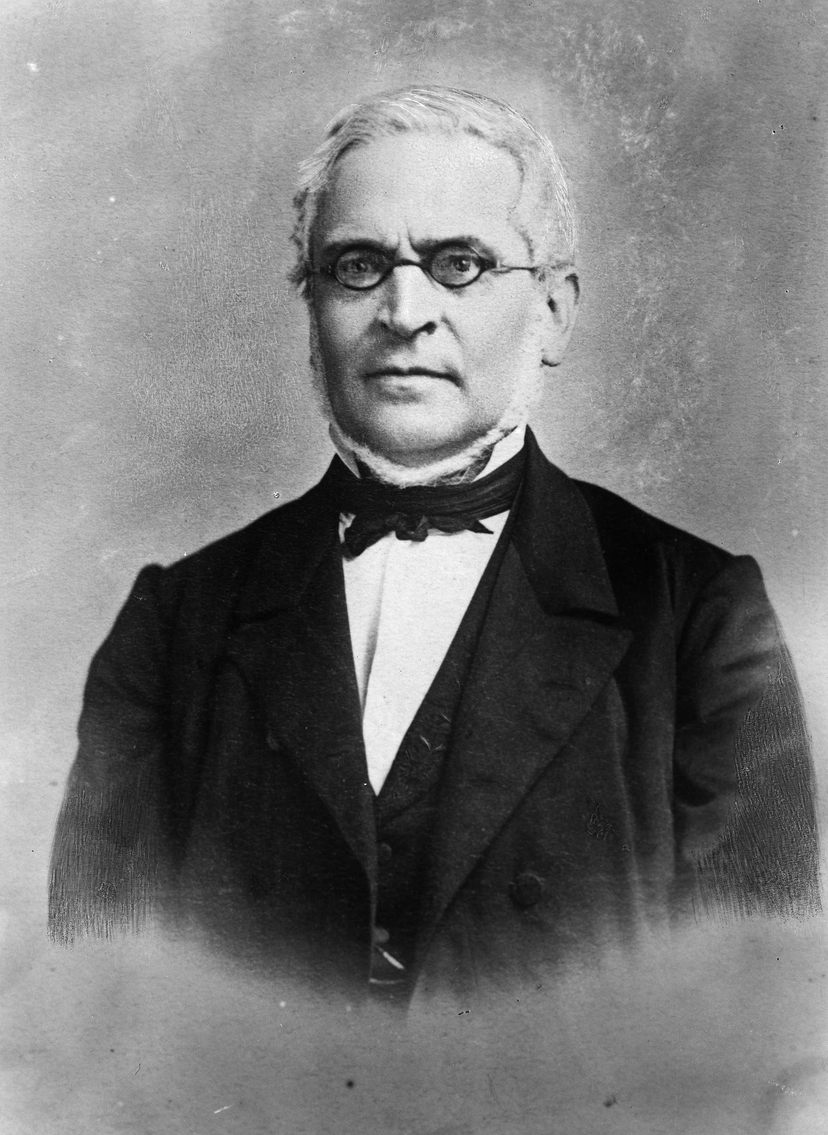
August Christian Manthey

August Christian Manthey (14 February 1811 – 25 May 1880) was a Norwegian Minister who held several government posts in the period 1856–1875. He served as Minister of Auditing, Justice, Finance, the Interior, the Navy and the Army, as well as being member of the Council of State Division in Stockholm in different periods.

Political offices
Preceded by Christian Zetlitz Bretteville	Norwegian Minister of Auditing; April 1856–August 1856	Succeeded by Christian Ludvig Diriks (acting)
Preceded by Jørgen Herman Vogt	Norwegian Minister of Justice and the Police; 1856–1857	Succeeded by Erik Røring Møinichen
Preceded by Christian Zetlitz Bretteville	Norwegian Minister of the Interior; 1858–1859	Succeeded by Christian Zetlitz Bretteville
Preceded by Hans Christian Petersen	Norwegian Minister of Justice and the Police; 1859–1860	Succeeded by Christian Birch-Reichenwald
Preceded by Ketil Motzfeldt	Norwegian Minister of the Navy and Postal Affairs; December 1861	Succeeded by Wolfgang Wenzel von Haffner
Preceded by Johan Christian Collett (acting)	Norwegian Minister of the Interior; 1861–1862	Succeeded by Christian Zetlitz Bretteville
Preceded by Harald Nicolai Storm Wergeland	Norwegian Minister of the Army; 1862–1863	Succeeded by Harald Nicolai Storm Wergeland
Preceded by Hans Gerhard Colbjørnsen Meldahl	Norwegian Minister of Justice and the Police; 1863–1864	Succeeded by Hans Gerhard Colbjørnsen Meldahl
Preceded by Christian Zetlitz Bretteville	Norwegian Minister of the Interior; 1865–1866	Succeeded by Christian Zetlitz Bretteville
Preceded by Harald Nicolai Storm Wergeland	Norwegian Minister of the Army; 1866–1867	Succeeded by Harald Nicolai Storm Wergeland
Preceded by Wolfgang Wenzel von Haffner	Norwegian Minister of the Navy and Postal Affairs; 1867–1868	Succeeded by Wolfgang Wenzel von Haffner
Preceded by Hans Gerhard Colbjørnsen Meldahl	Norwegian Minister of Justice and the Police; 1869–1870	Succeeded by Johan Collett Falsen
Preceded by Erik Røring Møinichen	Norwegian Minister of Finance; February 1870–September 1870	Succeeded by Henrik Laurentius Helliesen
Preceded by Johan Collett Falsen	Norwegian Minister of the Navy and Postal Affairs; 1871–1872	Succeeded by Ole Jacob Broch
Preceded by Harald Nicolai Storm Wergeland	Norwegian Minister of the Army; February 1872–June 1872	Succeeded by Harald Nicolai Storm Wergeland
Preceded by Ole Jacob Broch	Norwegian Minister of the Navy and Postal Affairs; May 1872–June 1872	Succeeded by Jacob Lerche Johansen
Preceded by Henrik Laurentius Helliesen	Norwegian Minister of Finance; 1872–1873	Succeeded by Henrik Laurentius Helliesen
Preceded by Jacob Lerche Johansen	Norwegian Minister of the Navy and Postal Affairs; 1873–1874	Succeeded by Jacob Lerche Johansen
Preceded by Henrik Laurentius Helliesen	Norwegian Minister of Finance; January 1874–April 1874	Succeeded by Henrik Laurentius Helliesen
Civic offices
Preceded by Fredrik Hartvig Johan Heidmann	County Governor of Hedmark; 1849–1856	Succeeded by Ludvig R. Kyhn
Preceded by Karelius August Arntzen	County Governor of Oslo; 1874–1880	Succeeded by Niels Mathias Rye
