= Impeachment in Norway =

Legal process in Norway

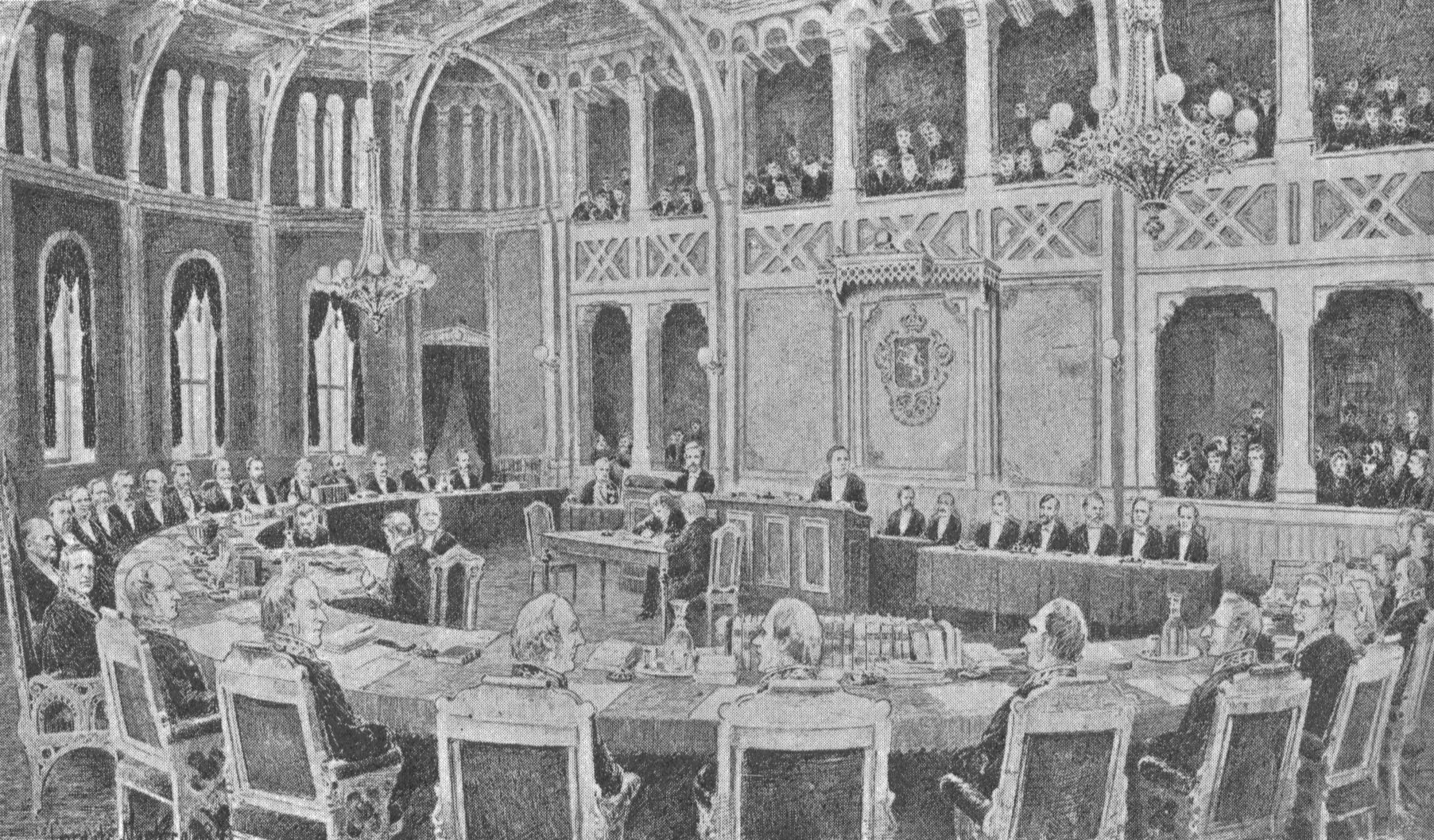
The impeachment trial of Christian August Selmer in 1884

In Norway, impeachment, also known as the Court of Impeachment (Norwegian: Riksrett), is a judicial process with the power to convict Members of Parliament, Members of the Council of State, and Supreme Court Justices for criminal acts performed in line of duty. Impeachment is based on the Constitution of Norway §§ 86 and 87. Parliament authorizes the impeachment process, which establishes a tribunal consisting of five members of the Supreme Court and six lay members appointed by the Parliament of Norway. Impeachment has been used eight times, the last case being held in 1927.

== Process ==
When adopted, the practice of impeachment in Norway was modeled off of federal impeachment in the United States. Similar to the United States, impeachment has two stages: a vote to impeach followed by a trial on whether to "convict" (remove).

Prior to a 2007 constitution change, impeachment was started in the Odelsting chamber. Ten members of the Lagting chamber and five from the Supreme Court then sat together as a court to render judgement, with members of the impeachment managers (prosecutors) coming from the Odelsting.

A 2007 constitutional change made the parliament unicameral (merging the two chambers), requiring the process of impeachment to also be changed. Under the change, the courts of impeachment now consist of eleven members, five from the supreme court and six lay members chosen by parliament for a period of six years. Current members of parliament are not eligible to serve, as they are presumed to have a conflict of interest in the matter. The Chief Justice of the Supreme Court is to lead the court of impeachment. Members of the parliament serve as managers (prosecutors), with prosecution administrated by a parliamentary committee (the Stortingets ansvarskommisjon). These changes made impeachment a more viable threat to office holders should they breach their limitations.

== History ==
Impeachment has been performed eight times in the history of the kingdom, and each time it has been aimed at members of the government. Six of the cases were in the period 1814–45. During the constitutional struggle in the last half of the 19th century, impeachment became vital following the case against Selmer's Cabinet in 1883 and 1884, concerning the veto rights of the King in matters of the constitution. Prior to this case, impeachment was the only way for parliament to dismiss a member of the cabinet; after 1884 Norway got a system of parliamentarism, and parliament could dismiss a member of cabinet through a majority vote.

After the constitutional battle of 1884 was over, there was only one case, where Prime Minister Abraham Berge and six members of his cabinet were found not guilty in 1927. Since then, impeachment has not been used, and is no longer considered part of the political game. Public commissions have since looked at reforming or removing impeachment, and transferring the institution to the ordinary courts. On 20 February 2007 the parliament voted to change the constitution such that the organization of impeachment becomes more potent, and changing the requirements, so the lay members of the court are not current members of parliament.

=== Cases ===
There have been eight cases of impeachment:

Person(s)	Period	Charges	Outcome
Fredrik Gottschalk von Haxthausen	1814–16	regarding having given incorrect information about the state of the army during the 1814 war, and thus possibly having caused a defeat in the war	Not convicted
Johan Caspar Herman Wedel-Jarlsberg	1821–22	regarding the Ministry of Finance having done trade with two British trading houses that had gone bankrupt	Not convicted
Thomas Fasting	1821	regarding having held two positions that had conflict of interest	Convicted
Johan Collett	1827	regarding three issues to not follow decisions made by the Storting	Not convicted
Severin Løvenskiold	1836	regarding the king's attempt to dissolve the Storting	Convicted
Jørgen Herman Vogt	1845	regarding not having followed the decisions of the Storting regarding custom rates	Not convicted
Christian August Selmer et al.	1884	regarding the king's right to veto changes to the constitution	Convicted
Abraham Berge; Odd S. Klingenberg; Christian F. Michelet; Cornelius Middelthon; Johan H. Rye Holmboe; Anders Venger; Karl Wilhelm Wefring	1926–27	regarding the government issuing secret state loans to a bank	Not convicted
