= Segelcke =

Segelcke is a surname. Notable people with the surname include:

- Lorentz Henrik Müller Segelcke, Norwegian military officer, engineer and politician
- Tore Segelcke (1901–1979), Norwegian actress
