= Nils Christian Irgens =

Norwegian military officer and politician

Nils Christian Irgens (10 October 1811 – 25 April 1878) was a Norwegian military officer and politician.

He was born in Sogndal as the son of Lars Johannes Irgens, founding father of the Norwegian Constitution. Nils Christian Irgens became a military officer in 1830, and advanced in the ranks, becoming colonel in 1861. In 1863 he became major general. He held this post until 1868. He chaired Centralforeningen for Udbredelse af Legemsøvelser og Vaabenbrug from 1864 to 1867.

On 3 April 1868 Irgens was appointed Minister of Defence. He held this post until 1 February 1872, when he was appointed a member of the Council of State Division in Stockholm. On 27 May 1872 he left due to the statsrådssak.

Irgens was a member of the Swedish Academy from 1865, and was a member of the board of Hovedbanen.

Sporting positions
Preceded by Otto Richard Kierulf	Chairman of Centralforeningen; 1864–1867	Succeeded by Otto Richard Kierulf
Political offices
Preceded by Harald Nicolai Storm Wergeland	Norwegian Minister of Defence; 1868–1872	Succeeded by August Christian Manthey
