= Thrap =

Thrap is a surname. Notable people with the surname include:

- Daniel Thrap (1832–1913), Norwegian priest, historian, and author
- Jørgen Berner Thrap (1898–1990), Norwegian judge
- Niels Andreas Thrap (1793–1856), Norwegian civil servant and politician
