= Lorentz Henrik Müller Segelcke =

Norwegian military officer, engineer and politician

Lorentz Henrik Müller Segelcke (14 November 1829 – 25 October 1910) was a Norwegian military officer, engineer and politician. He served as Norwegian Minister of the Army twice in the 1870s, and was the director-general of the Norwegian State Railways from 1883 to 1899.

== Personal life ==
He was born at Bogstad as a son of premier lieutenant Christen Arentz Segelcke (1801–1837) and Sofie Teresia Bonnevie (1810–1896). After his father's death, stipendiary magistrate Nils Andreas Thrap became his stepfather.

In July 1855 in Kongsberg he married Christine Augusta Bonnevie (1833–1927). Through her he was a son-in-law of Honoratus Bonnevie and a brother-in-law of Mathilde Dietrichson (née Bonnevie), Lorentz Dietrichson and Jacob Aall Bonnevie. Through Jacob he was an uncle of professor Kristine Bonnevie, judge Thomas Bonnevie, politician Carl Emil Christian Bonnevie and Severin Segelcke. He was also a brother-in-law of his own sister Margretha Henrikke, who married his wife's oldest brother Niels Cornelius Bonnevie. He was a father-in-law of Iver Munthe Daae.

== Career ==
Segelcke attended the Norwegian Military Academy from 1845 to 1848 and the Norwegian Military College from 1849 to 1852. He held the rank of second lieutenant from 1849, and was promoted to premier lieutenant in 1868, captain in 1870 and colonel in 1872. He served in the Engineer Brigade for many years, and also had a parallel career under the road inspector Johannes Benedictus Klingenberg in Christiania from 1855. He studied railway construction abroad between 1856 and 1857, and then worked as an engineer on the Kongsvinger Line until 1862. He was a tutor at the Military College from 1862 to 1872 and at the Military Academy from 1863 to 1866. He served on many public committees, and also had responsibilities in auditing.

On 1 July 1872 Segelcke was appointed Minister of the Army. He became a member of the Council of State Division in Stockholm on 1 July 1874, and left the post as Minister of the Army on 28 July 1874. In May 1875 he left the Council of State Division, but until 5 June he served as a member of the Interim Government during King Oscar II's travel in Germany. From 6 to 21 July there was another Interim Government due to Oscar II's travel in Russia. Then, from 21 July 1875 to 8 October 1877, Segelcke served as Minister of the Army for the second time.

In 1877 Segelcke became acting director of traffic in the Norwegian State Railways. In 1883 he became the first director-general, a position he held until his retirement in 1899. He also chaired the Norwegian State Railways board of directors from 1880 to 1905. He also continued in the military until 1893.

Segelcke was decorated as a Commander, First Class of the Royal Norwegian Order of St. Olav in 1876 (having been Knight since 1873), and was a Knight of the Danish Order of the Dannebrog and the Swedish Order of the Sword. He died in October 1910 in Skedsmo, where he lived with his son.

Political offices
Preceded by August Christian Manthey	Norwegian Minister of the Army; 1872–1874	Succeeded by Christian August Selmer
Preceded by Anders Sandøe Ørsted Bull (acting)	Norwegian Minister of the Army; 1875–1877	Succeeded by Adolph Frederik Munthe
