= Anders Sandøe Ørsted (disambiguation) =

Anders Sandøe Ørsted may refer to:

- Anders Sandøe Ørsted (1776–1860), Danish jurist and politician
- Anders Sandøe Ørsted (1816–1872), Danish biologist
- Anders Sandøe Ørsted (1826-1905), General Auditor and Mauor of Vejle, Denmark
- Anders Sandøe Ørsted Bull (1716–1907), Norwegian civil servant and government minister
