= Knut Tvedt =

Norwegian director and jurist

Knut Tvedt (27 September 1906 – 30 September 1989) was a Norwegian director and jurist. He was acting chief executive of the Norwegian Broadcasting Corporation from 1946 to 1948.

== Early life and education ==
Tvedt was born in Lier to the teacher and organist Elias Tvedt (1874–1956) and his wife Kristine Margrethe Odberg (1875–1948). He grew up in Drammen and took examen artium there in 1925. In 1930, he graduated from university with a cand.jur. degree.

== Career ==
After graduating he worked as a lawyer in Sandefjord, Drammen and Kristiansand before being employed as secretary by the Ministry of Labour for four years. In 1932, he was employed as a consultant by the Norwegian Broadcasting Corporation (NRK), in which corporation he remained in different positions for almost twenty-five years. His only interruption from the corporation was during the Second World War, when he maintained his own law firm in Oslo. Tvedt married Rannveig Marie Heen (1913–2008) on 11 November 1941.

After the war, Tvedt became chief secretary for NRK, and in 1946 he was appointed acting chief executive (later director-general) of the same corporation. In 1948, Kaare Fostervoll became director-general of NRK, and Tvedt was appointed financial manager. Tvedt also had many other positions in boards of state enterprises in Norway, among them Norsk Tipping and Norsk Spisevognselskap. He was also a board member of Filharmonisk Selskap and Aschehoug.

When Fostervoll retired in 1962, Tvedt applied for the director-general position. Hans Jacob Ustvedt applied for the same position. The board of NRK supported Tvedt, whilst the Broadcasting Council supported Ustvedt. In January 1962, the Government decided to appoint Ustvedt to director-general. The right-wing press criticised the appointment, arguing that it was done on political grounds.

Tvedt then left the NRK, and tried to make success as a barrister in Oslo. He also became juridical consultant of the music copyright company TONO, and, in 1965, the company's chief executive. He stayed in the company until his retirement in 1977. Tvedt died on 30 September 1989 in Oslo, and was cremated at Vestre gravlund on 9 October.

== Honours ==
In 1960, Tvedt was decorated as a Knight, First Class of the Order of St. Olav. He was also decorated as a Knight of the Danish Order of Dannebrog and the Swedish Order of Vasa. In 1973, Tvedt was upgraded from a Knight to a Commander of the Order of St. Olav. Four years later, he was decorated with the St. Hallvard's Medal. He was also appointed honorary member of the Norwegian Society of Composers and the Norwegian Union for Stage Directors.

== Selected works ==
- Bestemmelser om rasjonering og forsyning, with Andreas Schei, 1941
- Norsk konversasjonsleksikon Kringla Heimsins, chief editor together with Wollert Keilhau and Peter Kleppa (2nd ed.), 1948–1953
- Hvor Drammenselven iler... Drammens sparebank 150 år 1823–1973, editor together with H. S. Bakken and R. Anker Nilsen, 1973
- Tyve kulturprofiler, 1985
