= Harald Nicolai Storm Wergeland =

Norwegian military officer, politician and mountaineer

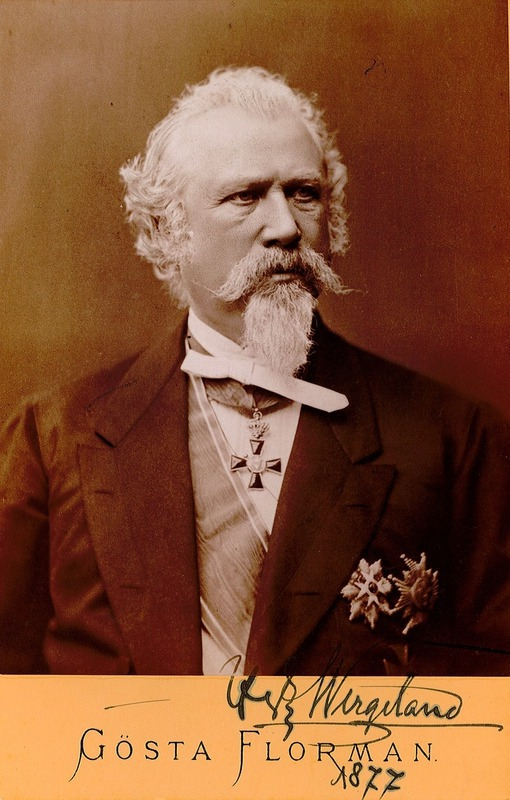
- Photograph by Gøsta Florman, c. 1877
- Born: 27 May 1814; Bergen, Sweden-Norway
- Died: 12 October 1893 (aged 79) Kristiania, Sweden-Norway
- Allegiance: Norway
- Branch: Norwegian Army
- Service years: 1826–1890
- Rank: Lieutenant General
- Awards: Order of Saint Olav; Order of the Sword

Harald Nicolai Storm Wergeland (27 May 1814 – 12 October 1893) was a Norwegian military officer, politician and mountaineer. Having reached the rank of major general by 1859, he served as Minister of the Army for several periods between 1857 and 1868. He later became lieutenant general. He had several notable family members.

== Personal life ==
Wergeland was born in Bergen as the son of Ingeborg Bergithe Lassesen Wergeland and her husband Gierth Christian Storm. A nephew of priest and politician Nicolai Wergeland and cousin of the poet Henrik Wergeland, feminist writer Camilla Collett and military officer Oscar Wergeland, Harald Wergeland grew up in their household.

In October 1841 he married Anne Sofie Schøyen, born in 1816 in Sør-Odal. The couple had several children.

== Career ==
Wergeland enrolled at the Norwegian Military Academy (Krigsskolen) at the age of twelve, graduating at the age of seventeen. He held the military rank of Second Lieutenant. Three years later he advanced to Premier Lieutenant and began holding lectures on artillery at the Norwegian Military Academy. He was later appointed aide-de-camp of King Oscar of Sweden and Norway.

Around 1840 Wergeland was assigned work with cartography. When exploring the Jotunheimen mountain range, he was among the first ascenders of several mountains, including Glittertind (2,464 metres (8,084 ft)). In 1857 he was promoted to the rank of colonel, and made chief of the General Staff. In 1859 he had been promoted to major general.

On 11 September 1857 Wergeland was appointed acting Minister of the Army. He only held this position until 2 October the same year. However, he would return to get the position on a permanent basis on 28 September 1860. He held this position for almost exactly two years, being transferred to the Council of State Division in Stockholm. In the meantime he had also been Minister of the Navy, from 1 November 1860 to 30 September 1861. After exactly one year in Stockholm, Wergeland again became Minister of the Army on 30 September 1863. He held this position until 2 April 1868, except for a period between 1 August 1866 and 30 June 1867 when he was in Stockholm for the second time.

In 1875, Wergeland was appointed commander of Akershus Fortress, having reached the rank of lieutenant general.

Wergeland also made his mark on civil life. He was a member of the board of directors of the Royal Norwegian Society for Development, the Norwegian Association of Hunters and Anglers and the Norwegian National Academy of Craft and Art Industry. He wrote books on a broad range of subjects, including the heating and ventilation of rooms, protection of lesser birds and oyster cultivation. For the latter purpose, he also founded a commercial company Det Norske Østers Compagni in 1877.

Wergeland retired from his military career in 1890. He died in 1893 in Kristiania.

== Honours and awards ==
- Sweden-Norway:
  - Commander Grand Cross of the Royal Order of the Sword, 7 September 1862
  - Grand Cross of the Royal Norwegian Order of Saint Olav, 3 April 1868
  - Knight of the Royal Order of Charles XIII, 8 November 1871
- (Austrian Empire) (Kingdom of Hungary) Austria-Hungary: Grand Cross of the Imperial Order of Leopold, 1872
- Kingdom of Bavaria: Grand Cross of the Order of Merit of the Bavarian Crown, 1872
- Denmark: Grand Cross of the Order of the Dannebrog, 18 April 1871
- Kingdom of Italy: Grand Cross of the Order of Saints Maurice and Lazarus
- Russian Empire: Knight of the Imperial Order of Saint Anna, 3rd Class

Political offices
Preceded by Hans Christian Petersen	Norwegian Minister of the Army (acting); September 1857–October 1857	Succeeded by Hans Christian Petersen
Preceded by Hans Glad Bloch	Norwegian Minister of the Army; September 1860–1862	Succeeded by August Christian Manthey
Preceded by Ketil Motzfeldt	Norwegian Minister of the Navy; November 1860–1861	Succeeded by Ketil Motzfeldt
Preceded by August Christian Manthey	Norwegian Minister of the Army; 1863–1866	Succeeded by August Christian Manthey
Preceded by August Christian Manthey	Norwegian Minister of the Army; 1867–1868	Succeeded by Nils Christian Irgens
