= Wolfgang Wenzel von Haffner =

Norwegian naval officer and politician

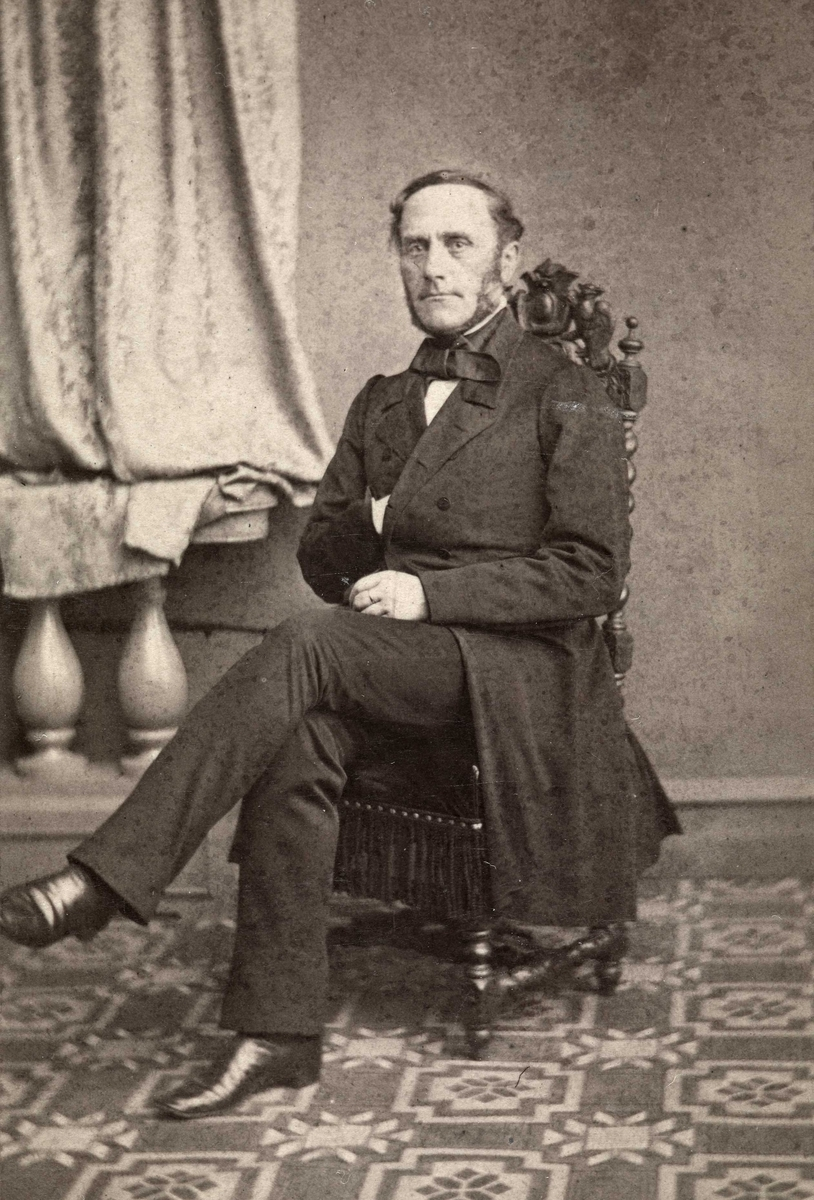
- Wolfgang Wenzel von Haffner in Oslo Museum

Minister of the Navy and Postal Affairs
- In office 1861–1863
- In office 1864–1867
- In office 1868–1869

Member of the Council of State Division in Stockholm
- In office October 1863 – 1864
- In office 1867–1868

Member of interim governments in Stockholm
- In office May 1875 – May 1875
- In office July 1875 – July 1875
- In office 1881–1881

Acting Prime Minister in Stockholm
- In office 21 March 1884 – 3 April 1884

Personal details
- Born: 23 November 1806 Kristiania, Norway
- Died: 11 November 1892 (aged 85) Kristiania, Norway
- Party: Independent
- Spouse: Louise Claudia le Normand Malthe
- Occupation: Naval officer

Wolfgang Wenzel von Haffner (23 November 1806 – 11 September 1892) was a Norwegian naval officer and politician.

== Early life and career ==
He was born in Christiania in 1806, as the son of Lieutenant Colonel Johan Friedrich Wilhelm Haffner and Sara Vilhelmine, née Hagerup. In 1834 in Ullensaker he married Louise Claudia le Normand Malthe (1806, Solum – 1872, Kristiania).

His career began in the navy. He became Sub-Lieutenant (second lieutenant or fenrik) in 1824, and Lieutenant in 1830. From 1839 to 1848 he had an interlude as a private tutor in Norwegian language and mathematics to the three eldest sons of Crown Prince Oscar of Sweden, namely Charles, Gustaf and Oscar. After this period, Haffner returned to the navy in 1848. He was promoted to Commodore in 1860.

== Political career ==
In 1861 he entered politics. He was appointed chief of the Ministry of the Navy and Postal Affairs in December 1861, being the fourth person to hold that position that year. In October 1863 he left to serve as a member of the Council of State Division in Stockholm. The next year he returned as Minister of the Navy and Postal Affairs, only to return to Stockholm in 1867. He returned one final time to the Ministry of the Navy and Postal Affairs to head it from June 1868 to March 1869. During this final period, the Parliament of Norway became severely disappointed with monetary amounts granted to enlargement of Karljohansvern. Johan Sverdrup set forward a motion of no confidence, and this motion passed in what has been called a "foreplay of parliamentarism".

In May 1875, July 1875 and 1881 King Oscar II (whom Haffner had formerly tutored) appointed Haffner an acting member of the interim governments in Stockholm. Such interim governments were established when the King travelled abroad. On 21 March 1884, when Selmer's Cabinet fell due to the impeachment trial, Haffner was again named a member of the Council of State Division in Stockholm. He was also appointed acting Prime Minister in Stockholm, as the previous Prime Minister in Stockholm, Otto Richard Kierulf, went down in the Selmer impeachment case. Over Haffner, two people served as acting Prime Ministers in Kristiania: Ole Bachke from 11 to 29 March and Niels Mathias Rye from 29 March to 3 April 1884. On 3 April a new cabinet, Schweigaard's Cabinet, was finally constituted, and Haffner was relieved of both his positions. The Schweigaard's Cabinet lasted only two months, being replaced by the Liberal Sverdrup's Cabinet on 26 June.

Haffner died in his birth city in 1892. He was buried at Vår Frelsers gravlund.

Political offices
Preceded by August Christian Manthey	Minister of the Navy and Postal Affairs; 1861–1863	Succeeded by Erik Røring Møinichen
Preceded by Erik Røring Møinichen	Minister of the Navy and Postal Affairs; 1864–1867	Succeeded by August Christian Manthey
Preceded by August Christian Manthey	Minister of the Navy and Postal Affairs; 1868–1869	Succeeded by Ole Jacob Broch
Preceded by Otto Richard Kierulf	Prime Minister in Stockholm (acting); March 1884–April 1884	Succeeded by Carl Otto Løvenskiold
