= Hans Glad Bloch =

Norwegian military officer and government official

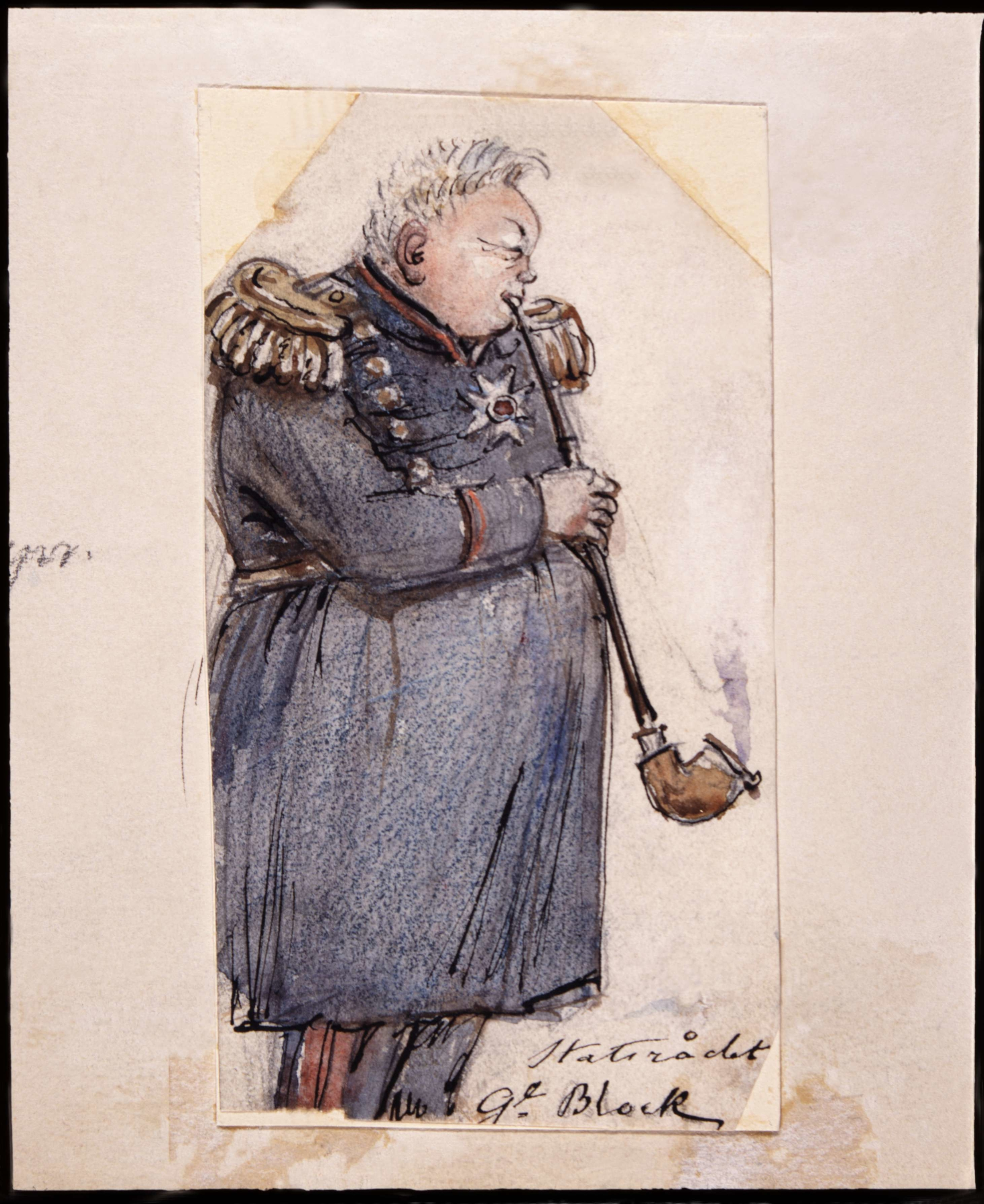
Painting by Fritz von Dardel

Hans Glad Bloch (16 September 1791 – 31 December 1865) was a Norwegian military officer and government official.

Born in Odalen (in the present-day Sør-Odal Municipality), he reached the rank of General in 1850. His career included a period as commander of the Norwegian Military Academy (1835–38) and commanding positions at the fortresses of Bergenhus and Fredriksten. He also worked as a surveyor while in the military, and in 1823 he released a road map of Norway. Later in life, he entered civil service, and served as Minister of the Army from 1853 to 1856, member of the Council of State Division in Stockholm from 1856 to 1857, and again as Minister of the Army from 1857 to 1860. He resigned his position on 28 September 1860.

Military offices
Preceded by Carl von und zu Mansbach	Commander of Bergenhus Fortress; 1838–	Succeeded by
Preceded by Carl von und zu Mansbach	Commander of Fredriksten Fortress; 1848–1853	Succeeded by Christian Frederik Michelet
Political offices
Preceded by Thomas Edvard von Westen Sylow	Norwegian Minister of Defence; 1853–1856	Succeeded by Hans Christian Petersen
Preceded by Hans Christian Petersen	Norwegian Minister of Defence; 1857–1860	Succeeded by Harald Nicolai Storm Wergeland
