= Christian Theodor Holtfodt =

Norwegian officer and politician

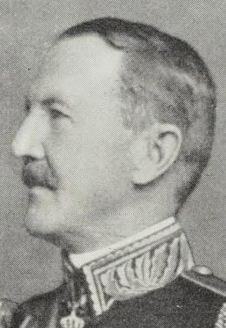

Minister of Defence
- In office 8 August 1914 – 20 February 1919
- Prime Minister: Gunnar Knudsen
- Preceded by: Hans Vilhelm Keilhau
- Succeeded by: Rudolf Peersen

Personal details
- Born: 17 October 1863 Christiania, Sweden-Norway
- Died: 24 February 1930 (aged 66) Bygdøy, Aker, Norway
- Party: Liberal
- Spouse: Helene Cathrine Lundh (m. 1892)
- Children: Rannfrid Holtfodt

Military service
- Allegiance: Norway
- Branch/service: Norwegian Army
- Years of service: 1889–1927
- Rank: General

Christian Theodor Holtfodt (17 October 1863 – 24 February 1930) was a Norwegian officer and a politician for the Liberal Party. He was Minister of Defence 1914–1919. He was said to be "Norway's most independent man", and fought for a strong defence to protect Norwegian neutrality.
