= Jens Peter Broch =

Norwegian linguist (1819–1886)

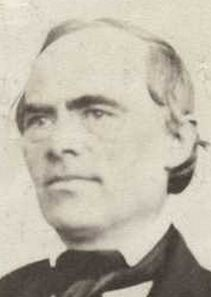
Jens Peter Broch in 1864

Jens Peter Broch (November 6, 1819 – March 15, 1886) was a Norwegian orientalist and linguist who specialized in Semitic languages.

== Personal life ==
Broch was born in Kristiansand. He was the son of Johan Jørgen Broch (1791–1860), a lieutenant colonel, a war commissioner, and parliamentarian, and Jensine Laurentze Bentzen (1790–1877). His brother Ole Jacob Broch (1818–1889) was a mathematician at the university in Oslo, and they built their own homes in the neighborhood known as "Professor Town" (Norwegian: Professorbyen); Jens' house was named Fridarheim and Ole's Fagerheim. Jens married Louise Joachime Müller (1827–1913) in 1847; she was the daughter of Captain Otto Fredrik Müller (1782–1854) and Vilhelmine Hedevig Bech (1796–1880). They had no children, but a foster daughter Hedvig Bie (born Solberg), who was his wife's sister's daughter.

== Education and career ==
Together with his brother Ole, Jens attended the Kristiansand Cathedral School for three years before the family moved to Christiania (now Oslo) in 1833. There they attended the private Headmaster Møller Institute (Norwegian: Overlærer Møllers institut), which Ulrik Wilhelm Møller (1791–1853) had founded in 1822. Jens studied there until he received his candidatus theologiæ degree in 1843, and then he became a teacher at the Nissen Latin and Secondary School (Norwegian: Nissens latin- og realskole), which his brother Ole had also just started teaching at. In 1845 he became a research fellow at the Royal Frederik University (now the University of Oslo), and was its second teacher in oriental studies and oriental languages, especially Arabic. He studied abroad and was hosted, among others, by Heinrich Leberecht Fleischer (1801–1888) in Leipzig, the same place where the prominent theologian Carl Paul Caspari (1814–1892) stayed from 1834 to 1838 and received his doctorate in 1842. It was the experience of Broch and Caspari in Leipzig that later inspired the theologian Elias Blix (1836–1902) to stay in the city from 1871 to 1872. Broch also had a long stay abroad from 1853 to 1855. In 1859 he published the first Arabic text in Norway and he translated many poems from Arabic. He was elected to the newly established Christiania Science Society (now the Norwegian Academy of Science and Letters) in 1859, and to the Royal Norwegian Society of Sciences and Letters in 1877. He became an associate lecturer in 1865 and a full professor in 1876. His main work is a very careful edition of Al-Zamakhshari's grammatical work Al-Mufassal (1879).
