= Anders Sandøe Ørsted Bull =

Norwegian civil servant and government minister

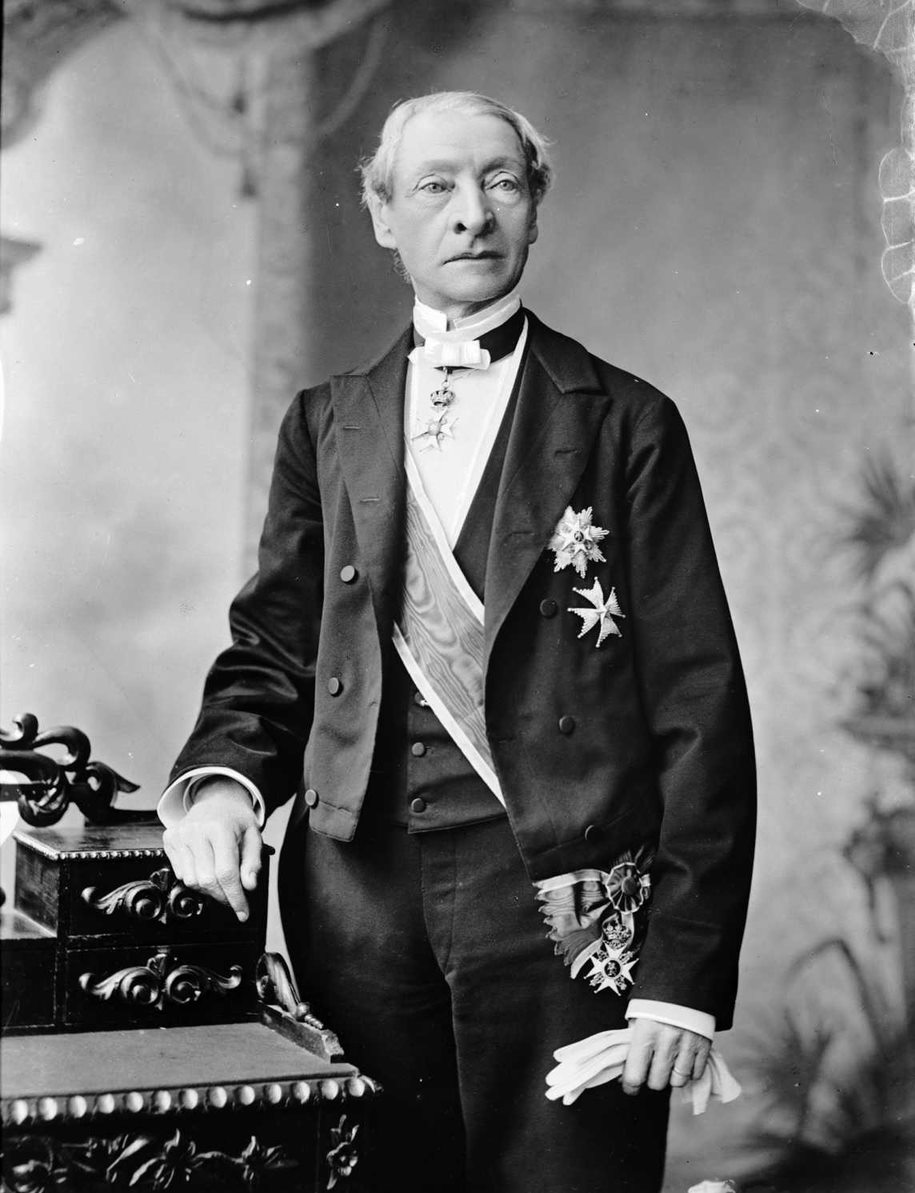
- Norwegian civil servant and government minister Anders Sandoe Orsted Bull
- Born: September 13, 1817; Bergen in Hordaland, Norway
- Died: April 15, 1907 (aged 89)
- Occupations: civil servant and government minister
- Known for: mayor of Oslo, twice acting Minister of the Army

Anders Sandøe Ørsted Bull (13 September 1817 – 15 April 1907) was a Norwegian civil servant and government minister. He served as acting Minister of the Army in 1875 (twice), 1881 and 1884. He also served as mayor of Oslo in 1877 and 1878.

== Background ==
He was born at Bergen in Hordaland, Norway. He was a son of Chief Justice Georg Jacob Bull (1785-1854) and Barbara Albertine Ørsted (1783-1865). His mother was a sister of Danish physicist Hans Christian Ørsted and of Danish jurist Anders Sandøe Ørsted. He was a grandson of Chief Justice Johan Randulf Bull, a grandnephew of Johan Lausen Bull and an uncle of chief physician Edvard Isak Hambro Bull.

== Career ==
In 1835, he became a student at Bergen Cathedral School. He joined the Ministry of the Army in 1837. In 1840, he became a legal candidate. He was a representative in 1846, bureau chief in 1850 and expedition secretary in 1854. He was appointed General War Commissioner of the Army in 1860. In 1875, he was acting Minister of the Army from 26 May to 4 June, and from 6 July to 20 July. He was also acting Minister of the Army from 16 September to 25 September 1881 and from 19 March to 2 April 1884. He later served as the Mayor of Oslo in 1877 and 1878.

== Personal life ==
He was married in 1848 to Caroline Elisabeth Dahl (b. 1822), surviving daughter of the artist Johan Christian Dahl. They had the son Karl Sigwald Johannes Bull who would become Minister of Defence from 1910 to 1912.

Political offices
Preceded by Christian Selmer	Norwegian Minister of the Army (acting); May 1875–June 1875	Succeeded by Christian Selmer
Preceded by Christian Selmer	Norwegian Minister of the Army (acting); July 1875	Succeeded by Lorentz Henrik Müller Segelcke
Preceded by Otto Joachim Løvenskiold	Mayor of Oslo; 1877–1878	Succeeded by Christian Homann Schweigaard
Preceded by Adolph Frederik Munthe	Norwegian Minister of the Army (acting); September 1881	Succeeded by Adolph Frederik Munthe
Preceded by Adolph Frederik Munthe	Norwegian Minister of the Army (acting); March 1884–April 1884	Succeeded by Lars Christian Dahll
