= Norsk konversasjonsleksikon Kringla Heimsins =

Norwegian encyclopedia

Norsk konversasjonsleksikon Kringla Heimsins is a Norwegian encyclopedia published in six volumes from 1931 to 1934, edited by librarian at Stortinget, Wollert Keilhau. A second edition was issued in eight volumes from 1948 to 1954, edited by Keilhau, Peter Kleppa and Knut Tvedt. It was published by the publishing house Nasjonalforlaget.
