= Baltzer Fleischer =

Norwegian civil servant and county governor

- Born: 29 September 1703
- Died: 16 December 1767 (aged 64)
- Occupations: Civil servant; count governor

Baltzer Fleischer (29 September 1703 – 16 December 1767) was a Norwegian civil servant and county governor.

Baltzer Sechmann Fleischer was born in Holbæk on the island of Zealand in Denmark. He was the son of Herman Reinhold Fleischer (1656–1712) and Megtele Annamaria Sechmann (ca. 1675–1705). His father's family was originally from East Prussia, but had ties to Norway dating to the early 1600s. As a young man, he began a military career and served for a time in Norway. He came to Norway in 1734 as vice mayor and councilman in Christiania (now Oslo). He served as county manager of Smålenene (now Østfold) for almost 25 years. Baltzer Fleischer was appointed in the Court of Justice in 1749 and the Councillor of State in 1760.

He made a significant contribution to land cultivation of the county. The purpose was a desire to ensure stable supply of labor and to prevent an increase in poverty. His provisions included additional ground clearing and creation of local granaries at all parish churches which could ensure grain supply in times of emergency. This measure was initiated in 1759 within Smålenene. An increasing criticism from farmers against the procedure and suspicions that Fleischer personally enriched himself resulted in a halt to the project in 1764.

== Personal life ==
In 1727, he married Anna Margrethe Aboe (died 1751). They were the grandparents of Palle Rømer Fleischer (1781–1851).
