= Hans Riddervold =

Norwegian politician (1795–1876)

Right Reverend Hans Riddervold
- Bishop
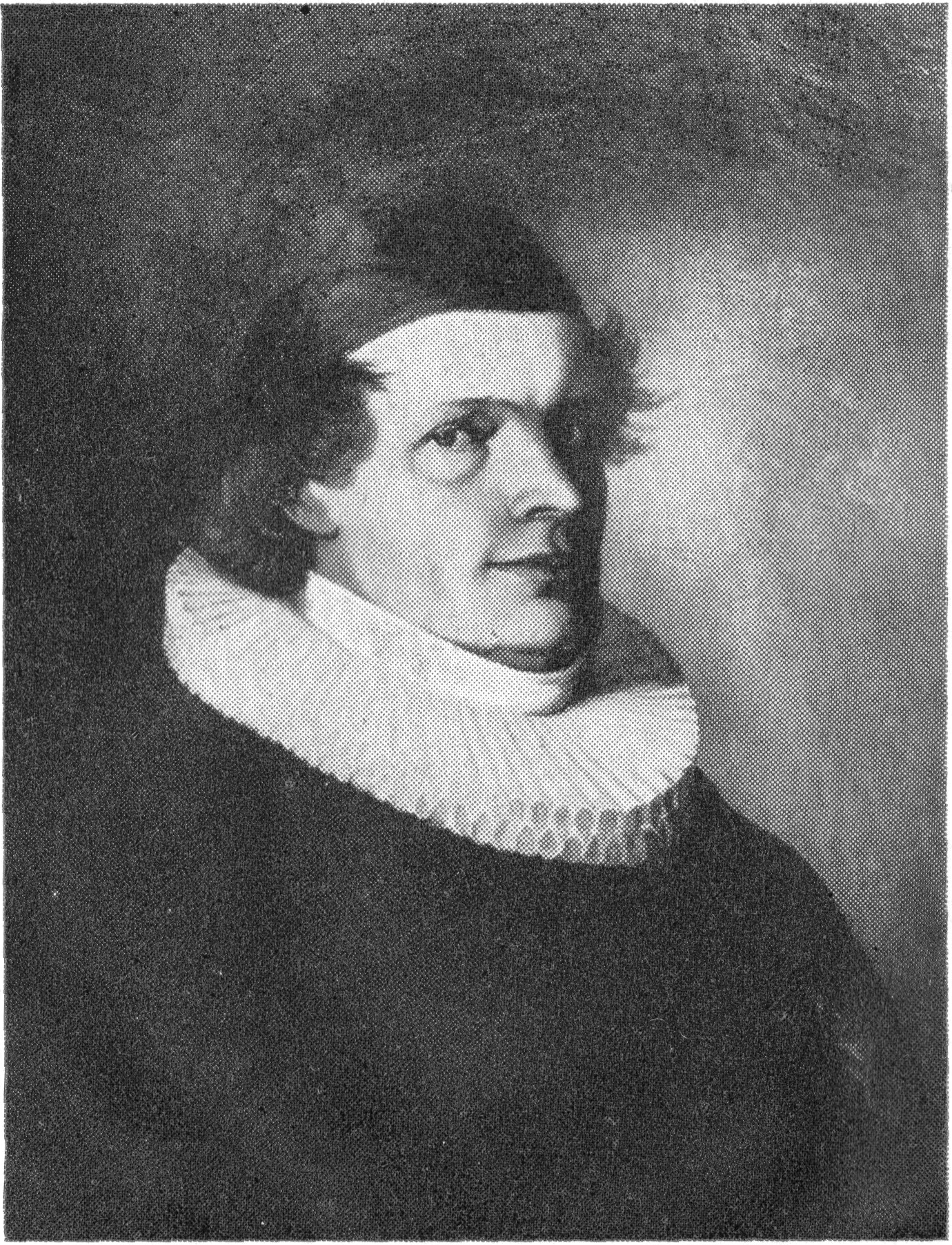
- Church: Church of Norway
- Diocese: Nidaros

Personal details
- Born: 7 November 1795 Åsgårdstrand, Vestfold, Norway
- Died: 20 July 1876 (aged 80) Christiania, Norway
- Denomination: Christian
- Parents: Adolf Kvernheim Riddervold and Bredine Bolette Nielsen
- Spouse: Anna Maria Bull
- Children: Julius Riddervold
- Occupation: Priest / Politician
- Education: Cand.theol.
- Alma mater: Oslo Cathedral School

Hans Riddervold (7 November 1795 – 20 July 1876) was a Norwegian priest and politician.

== Personal life ==
He was born at Teien in Åsgårdstrand as a son of shipmaster Adolf Kvernheim Riddervold (1760–1817) and Bredine Bolette Nielsen (1773–1811). He was the father of Julius Riddervold, who in turn was a grandfather of Hans Julius Riddervold. Hans Riddervold's daughter Bodil Mathea married Cato Guldberg and the daughter Mette Marie Riddervold married Peter Andreas Jensen.

Hans Riddervold married Anna Maria Bull (1803–1870) in June 1822. She was a younger sister of Cato Guldberg's mother Hanna Sophie Theresia Bull, making Cato and Bodil Mathea first cousins.

== Career ==
He received his Cand.theol. degree in 1819. He was the bishop of Nidaros from 1843 until 1849. In 1827, he was elected to the Parliament of Norway and while in office, he was elected as the president of the Storting.

He was the minister of church affairs and education for several periods between 1848 and 1872, as well as minister of auditing in 1852 and minister of finance in 1853, and member of the Council of State Division in Stockholm from 1849 to 1850 and 1854–1855.

Riddervold was awarded the Grand Cross of the Order of St. Olav in 1859 and the Gold Medal for Outstanding Civic Service in 1869.

Church of Norway
Preceded by Peder Olivarius Bugge	Bishop of the Diocese of Trondhjem; 1843–1849	Succeeded by Hans Jørgen Darre
Political offices
Preceded by Poul Christian Holst	Norwegian Minister of Church and Education; 1848–1849	Succeeded by Jørgen Herman Vogt
Preceded by Nicolai Johan Lohmann Krog and Frederik Stang	Member of the Norwegian Council of State Division in Stockholm; 1849–1850; Served alongside: Hans Christian Petersen	Succeeded by Søren Anton Wilhelm Sørenssen and Nicolai Johan Lohmann Krog
Preceded by Jørgen Herman Vogt	Norwegian Minister of Church and Education; 1850–1854	Succeeded by Jørgen Herman Vogt
Preceded by Nicolai Johan Lohmann Krog	Chief of the Norwegian Ministry of Auditing; 1852	Succeeded by Nicolai Johan Lohmann Krog
Preceded by Jørgen Herman Vogt	Norwegian Minister of Finance and Customs; 1853	Succeeded by Jørgen Herman Vogt
Preceded by Hans Christian Petersen and Thomas Edvard von Westen Sylow	Member of the Norwegian Council of State Division in Stockholm; 1849–1850; Served alongside: Frederik Stang	Succeeded by Erik Røring Møinichen and Hans Christian Petersen
Preceded by Otto Vincent Lange	Norwegian Minister of Church and Education; 1855–1872	Succeeded by Carl Peter Parelius Essendrop
Preceded by Hans Christian Petersen	Chief of the Norwegian Ministry of Auditing; 1861	Succeeded by Frederik Stang
