= Jochum Johansen =

Norwegian civil servant

Jochum Nicolai Müller Johansen
- Born: 12 October 1823; Fredriksvern, Norway
- Died: 28 January 1913 (aged 89); Kristiania
- Occupation: Civil servant
- Known for: Pioneer for the blind
- Relatives: Jacob Lerche Johansen (brother); Daniel Thrap (brother-in-law); Christian Lerche (great-grandson)

Jochum Nicolai Müller Johansen (12 October 1823 – 28 January 1913) was a Norwegian civil servant and pioneer for the blind.

Johansen was born in Fredriksvern to naval officer Paul Martin Johansen and Marie Sophie Hvoslef, and was a brother of Jacob Lerche Johansen. In 1852, he married Hanne Wilhelmine Cathrine Thrap, a sister of Daniel Thrap.

He graduated as a jurist from the Royal Frederick University in Christiania in 1843. From 1853, he was appointed superintendent at the Rikshospitalet and Fødselsstiftelsen in Christiania. He served as bailiff in Buskerud from 1873 to 1896. Johansen established the first school for the blind in Norway in 1860, Christiania Blindeinstitut. In 1860 he also established the society Foreningen For Blinde, which he chaired from 1860 to 1910. He was decorated Knight of the Order of St. Olav in 1887.
