= Karl Wilhelm Wefring =

Norwegian physician and politician

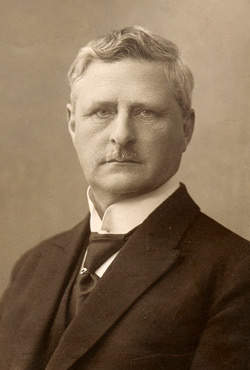

Minister of Defence
- In office 5 March 1926 – 26 July 1926
- Prime Minister: Ivar Lykke
- Preceded by: Rolf Jacobsen
- Succeeded by: Ingolf E. Christensen
- In office 6 March 1923 – 25 July 1924
- Prime Minister: Otto B. Halvorsen; Abraham Berge
- Preceded by: Ivar Aavatsmark
- Succeeded by: Rolf Jacobsen
- In office 21 June 1920 – 22 June 1921
- Prime Minister: Otto B. Halvorsen
- Preceded by: Ivar Aavatsmark
- Succeeded by: Ivar Aavatsmark

Member of the Norwegian Parliament
- In office 1 January 1925 – 31 December 1927
- Constituency: Oslo
- In office 1 January 1916 – 31 December 1918
- Constituency: Søndre Hedemarken

Personal details
- Born: 11 October 1867 Fiskum, Buskerud, United Kingdoms of Sweden and Norway
- Died: 28 September 1938 (aged 70) Oslo, Norway
- Party: Free-minded Liberal
- Spouse: Johanne Christine Wefring
- Children: Gunnar Wefring

Karl Wilhelm Wefring (11 October 1867 – 28 September 1938) was a Norwegian physician and politician who served as Minister of Defence in the 1920s.

== Political career ==
Wefring was first elected to the Parliament of Norway as an independent for South Hedemark for the period 1916–1818. He was the Norwegian Minister of Defence 1920–1921, 1923-1924 and 1926. He served in the parliament for Oslo, representing the Liberal Left Party in the period 1925-1927 where he held the position as president of the Odelsting.

== Professional career ==
Wefring became attending physician at the national institution with responsibility for the mental ill (Statens sinnssykevesen) in 1919. He was "medisinaldirektør" ("director of health") in Norway from 1927 to 1930, and director for the National Hospital from 1930 to 1937.
