= Jacob Lerche Johansen =

Norwegian naval officer and politician

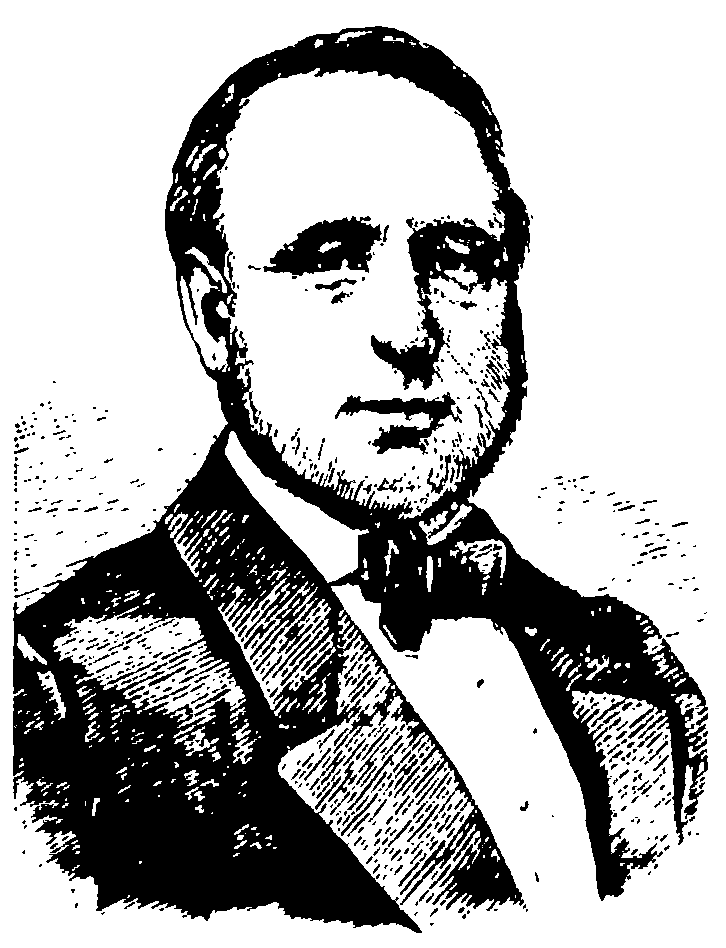
Jacob Lerche Johansen.

Jacob Lerche Johansen (1818–1900) was a Norwegian naval officer and politician. He was Minister of the Navy and Postal Affairs for several periods between 1872 and 1884, (Note: 1872–1873, 1874–1877, 1878–1880, 1880–1881 and 1882–1884) as well as member of the Council of State Division in Stockholm several times during the same period. (Note: 1873–1874, 1877–1878, 1881–1882 and 1884)

He was a brother of civil servant Jochum Johansen.
