= Carl Keilhau =

Norwegian author, poet and journalist

- Born: 25 July 1919
- Died: 20 December 1957 (aged 38)
- Occupations: Journalist and poet
- Father: Wollert Keilhau

Carl Keilhau (25 July 1919 – 20 December 1957) was a Norwegian author, poet and journalist.

== Biography ==
Carl Keilhau was born at Oslo, Norway. He was the son of librarian Wollert Keilhau and Anna Mathilde Østvold. He attended Fagerborg Upper Secondary School (1935–1938). He worked as journalist for the newspapers Dagbladet, Verdens Gang and Morgenbladet, and was known under his pen name "Pirat". He made his literary debut in 1947 with the poetry collection Over broen. Among his other poetry collections are Vi kan ikke flykte from 1952, Nocturne from 1955, and Konsert i november from 1957. He was awarded the Sarpsborgprisen literature prize in 1951.
