= Wollert Keilhau =

Norwegian librarian and encyclopedist

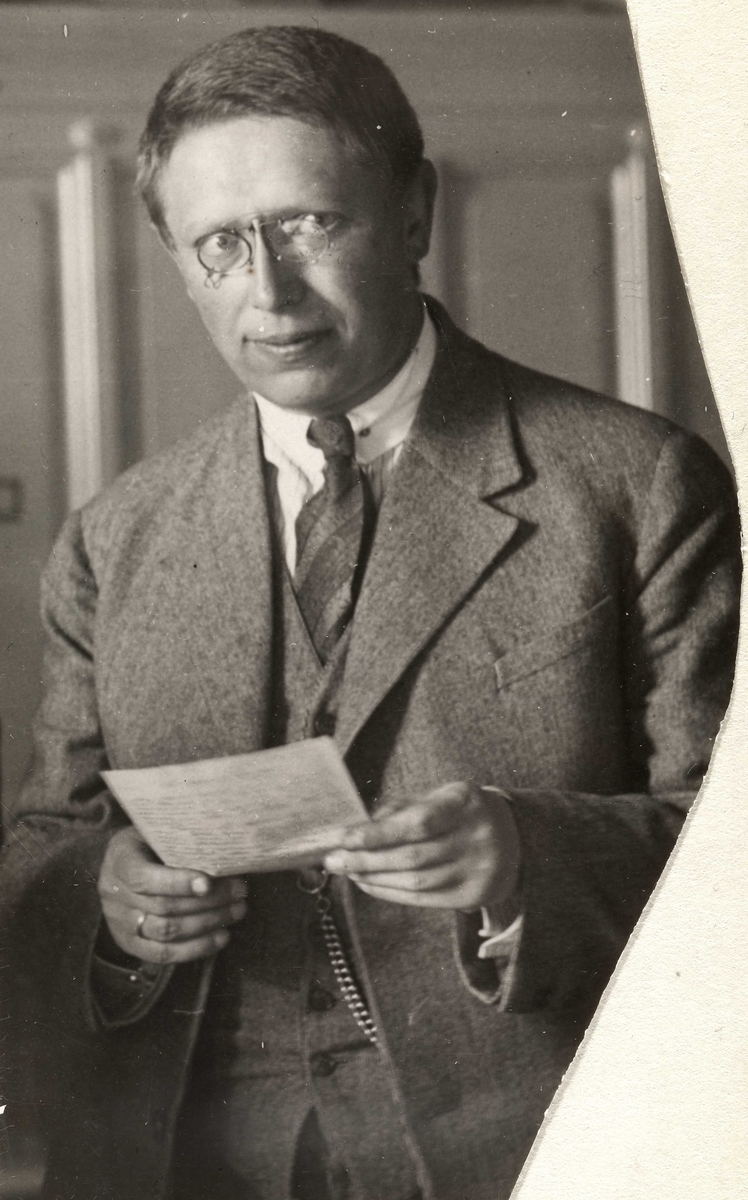
- Born: Wollert Otto Hallvard Konow Keilhau; 8 February 1894; Kristiania, Norway
- Died: 19 October 1958 (aged 64)
- Education: Royal Frederick University
- Occupations: Librarian and encyclopedist
- Children: Carl Keilhau
- Awards: Order of Dannebrog; Order of the Polar Star

Wollert Otto Hallvard Konow Keilhau (8 February 1894 – 19 October 1958) was a Norwegian librarian and encyclopedist.

== Personal life ==
He was born in Kristiania as a son of Carl Keilhau (1864–1900) and Modesta Konow (1864–1931). Keilhau was a Saxon immigrant family in the late 1700s. Wollert Keilhau was a grandson of Lieutenant Colonel Wilhelm Christian Keilhau and nephew of Major General Hans Vilhelm Keilhau, and first cousin of economist and historian Wilhelm Christian Keilhau. On the mother's side he was a great-grandson of politician Carl Konow, and named after his maternal grandfather Wollert Otto Konow (1833–1895).

In 1918 he married farmer's daughter Anna Mathilde "Magnhild" Østvold. Their son Carl Keilhau became a journalist and poet.

== Career ==
He finished his secondary education in 1912, and enrolled in philology studies at the Royal Frederick University. Already in 1914 he was hired at the Deichman Library, then at the Parliament of Norway Library. He was head librarian here from 1924.

He edited the encyclopedia Norsk konversasjonsleksikon Kringla Heimsins, published in six volumes from 1931 to 1934. He was also a co-editor of the second edition of the encyclopedia, issued from 1948 to 1954. While studying he chaired the students' Nynorsk association Studentmållaget in 1916. He also contributed extensively to the biographical dictionary Norsk biografisk leksikon.

He was decorated as a Knight of the Order of the Dannebrog and the Order of the Polar Star. He died in October 1958 and was buried at Vår Frelsers gravlund. His mother and his son Carl were already buried there, while his wife Magnhild was buried there in 1987.
