= Daniel Thrap =

Norwegian priest, historian and author

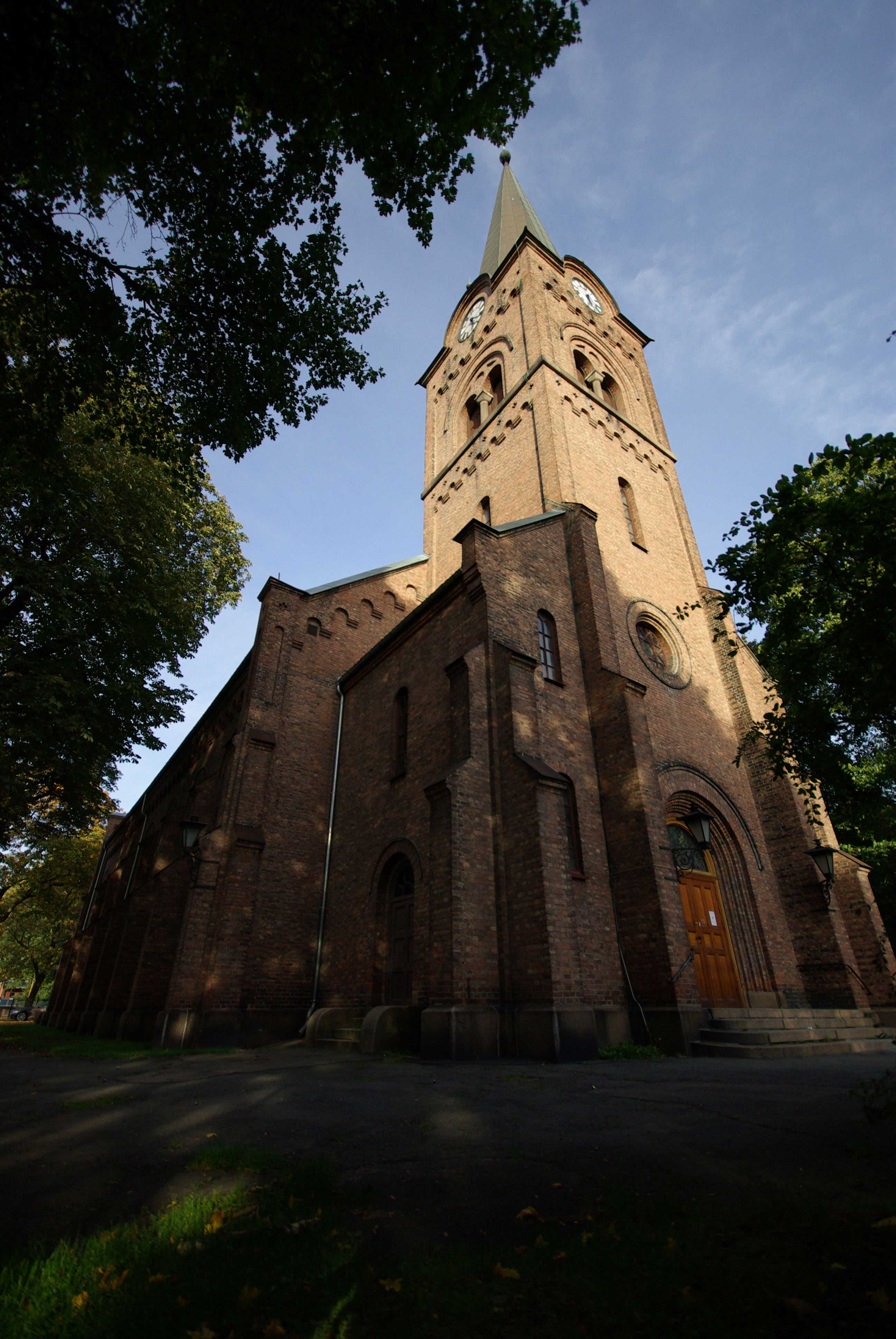
Daniel Thrap was the vicar of Sofienberg Church (1880 to 1902)

Daniel Smith Thrap (18 September 1832 – 20 March 1913) was a Norwegian priest, historian and author.

== Biography ==
Daniel Thrap was born at Aker in Oslo, Norway. He was the son of Niels Andreas Thrap (1793–1856) and Maren Christine Bonnevie (1801–1838). He was a brother-in-law of civil servant Jochum Johansen.

Daniel Thrap graduated with his cand.theol. degree in 1856. He worked in Bergen at the Bergen Cathedral and as chaplain for the Bergen prison system from 1857 to 1876. He was pastor in Modum in Buskerud from 1876 to 1880. From 1880 to 1902, he was vicar at Sofienberg Church (Sofienberg Kirke) in Sofienbergparken within the district of Grünerløkka in Oslo.

Thrap wrote a number of biographies and published collections of sermons. He also wrote a number of articles for newspapers in both Bergen and Oslo. Additionally he edited the magazine Zuluvennen, a publication for Norwegian mission churches. His notable works include Bidrag til den norske Kirkes Historie i det nittende Aarhundrede, which consisted of two volumes, released in 1884 and 1890.

== Selected works ==
- Hyrdebreve fra bergenske Biskoper (1875)
- Bergenske Kirkeforhold i det 17de Aarhundrede (1879)
- Thomas von Westen og Finne-missjonen (1882), on priest Thomas von Westen and the church's mission to the Sámi
- Bidrag til den norske Kirkes Historie i det nittende Aarhundrede (1884–1890), on the history of the Church of Norway
- Knud Spødervold og de stærk troende (1892), covering lay preacher Knud Spødervold and the Strong Believers
- Christiansands Stifts Prester i det syttende Aarhundrede (1899)
- Familien Bonnevie i Norge og Danmark 1715-1900 (1900)
- Wilhelm Andreas Wexels: Livs- og Tidsbillede (1905)
- Brødremenigheden i Norge (1908), on the Moravian Church in Norway

== Sources ==
- Knudtzon, Nicolay Heinrich (2012). Daniel Thraps erindringer om Handelsmænd i Bergen på 1800-tallet (in Norwegian). Oslo: Novus Forlag. ISBN 978-82-7099-712-1.
