= Hans Huitfeldt Riddervold =

Hans Huitfeldt Riddervold (16 October 1927 – 26 July 1980) was a Norwegian media executive.

He was born in Kristiania as a son of newspaper manager Hans Julius Riddervold (1901–1986) and Cathrine Huitfeldt. He was a paternal great-great-grandson of politician Hans Riddervold, He was a nephew of editor Henrik Jørgen Schibsted Huitfeldt. He was married to Tove, née Baumann.

He took his examen artium in 1946, and took a bookprinter's apprenticeship in Grøndahl & Søn from 1947 to 1951. He then studied at the Carnegie Institute of Technology and graduated with the Bachelor of Science degree in 1954. He was hired in the family-owned newspaper Aftenposten in 1953 as a civil engineer. He advanced to technical manager in 1957, technical director in 1966 and chief executive officer in 1970. From 1975 to his death in 1980 he was the chief executive officer of Schibsted.

He was a board member of Aftenposten from 1966, and his wife became a board member there as well. He was also a board member of Verdens Gang, the Norwegian News Agency and Lydbåndservice. He was a board member of the employers' organization Norske Avisers Landsforbund from 1967 and the Norwegian Press Association from 1971.

He died in July 1980 and was buried in Ullern.
