= Thomas Fasting =

Norwegian naval officer and government minister

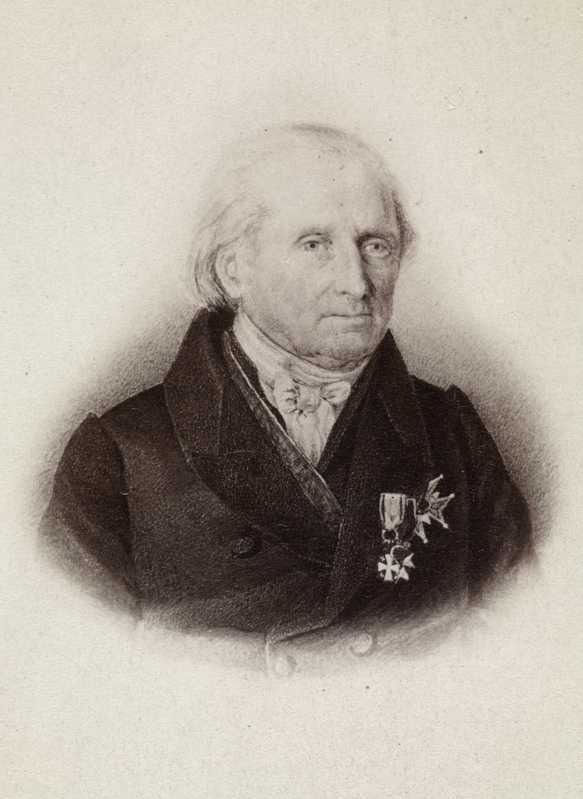
- Born: 25 February 1769; Lista, Denmark-Norway
- Died: 21 November 1841 (aged 72); Christiania, Sweden-Norway
- Military career
- Allegiance: Denmark–Norway (1785–1814); Norway (1814–1839)
- Branch: (Denmark) Royal Dano-Norwegian Navy (Norway) Royal Norwegian Navy
- Service years: 1785–1839
- Rank: Admiral
- Conflicts: War of the Second Coalition; Battle of Copenhagen; Gunboat War; Swedish–Norwegian War
- Awards: Dannebrogordenen; Order of the Sword

Thomas Fasting (25 February 1769 – 21 November 1841) was a Norwegian naval officer and government minister.

Fasting was born at Lista in Lister og Mandal county, Norway. He was the son of Lieutenant Colonel Soren Christian Fasting (1729–1782) and Benedicte Tyrholm (1734–1774). He started serving in the Royal Dano-Norwegian Navy in 1785. He became captain of the warship Ærøe in 1795, which was stationed in the Danish West Indies. He was also fighting in the Battle of Copenhagen in 1801. In the Gunboat War from 1807 to 1814, he was commander of Fredrikstad Fortress and later captain of the warship Dantzich.

Fasting was given command of the Royal Norwegian Navy after the union with Denmark ended in the spring of 1814, and was the commander of the navy during the war with Sweden. By fall of that year, he was a member of the interim government. In 1815, he was appointed minister in the Department of the Navy, and for the next 24 years he was Secretary of the Naval administrative.

He served as a member of the Council of State Division in Stockholm for six periods between 1817 and 1836. He was Minister of the Navy in eight periods between 1815 and 1839, as well as head of the Ministry of the Army in 1828 and 1832. Fasting was the first individual ever convicted in an impeachment trial by the Norwegian Constitutional Court of the Realm (Riksrett) in 1821.
