= Hans Julius Riddervold =

Norwegian media executive (1901–1986)

Hans Julius Riddervold (20 May 1901 – 1986) was a Norwegian media executive.

He was born in Kristiania as a son of attorney Hans Riddervold (1869–1928) and Sophie Magdalena Haneborg. He was a paternal great-grandson of politician Hans Riddervold, and his father was a first cousin of Nils Riddervold Jensen. In 1925 he married Cathrine Huitfeldt, a sister of Henrik Jørgen Schibsted Huitfeldt. They had the son Hans Huitfeldt Riddervold.

He took his examen artium in 1920, and also graduated from Kristiania Commerce School in 1922. He worked in the company Stormbull from 1924, and then started in the family-owned newspaper Aftenposten. He advanced to office manager in 1930, then manager from 1939. He also served a few years as chief executive officer. He was a board member from 1935, and after retiring in 1970 he was the board's chairman from 1970 to 1976.

He was the secretary of the employers' organization Osloavisenes Forening from 1934 to 1946. When this organization merged in 1947 to form Norske Avisutgiveres Landsforbund, Riddervold was a board member from 1949 to 1967, chairing the organization from 1954 to 1957. He was also deputy chairman of the Norwegian News Agency from 1967 and chairman from 1971 to 1972. Outside of the media, he was a board member of Hofsfos Træsliperi og Papirfabrik from 1939.

During the occupation of Norway by Nazi Germany, Riddervold was imprisoned in Grini concentration camp from 17 January to 29 July 1942. Aftenposten editor Johannes Nesse had been imprisoned in September 1941. Henrik Jørgen Schibsted Huitfeldt, subeditor in Aftenposten at the time, was imprisoned from January to December 1942. Riddervold died in 1986.
