= Hans Vilhelm Keilhau =

Norwegian artillery officer and Government minister

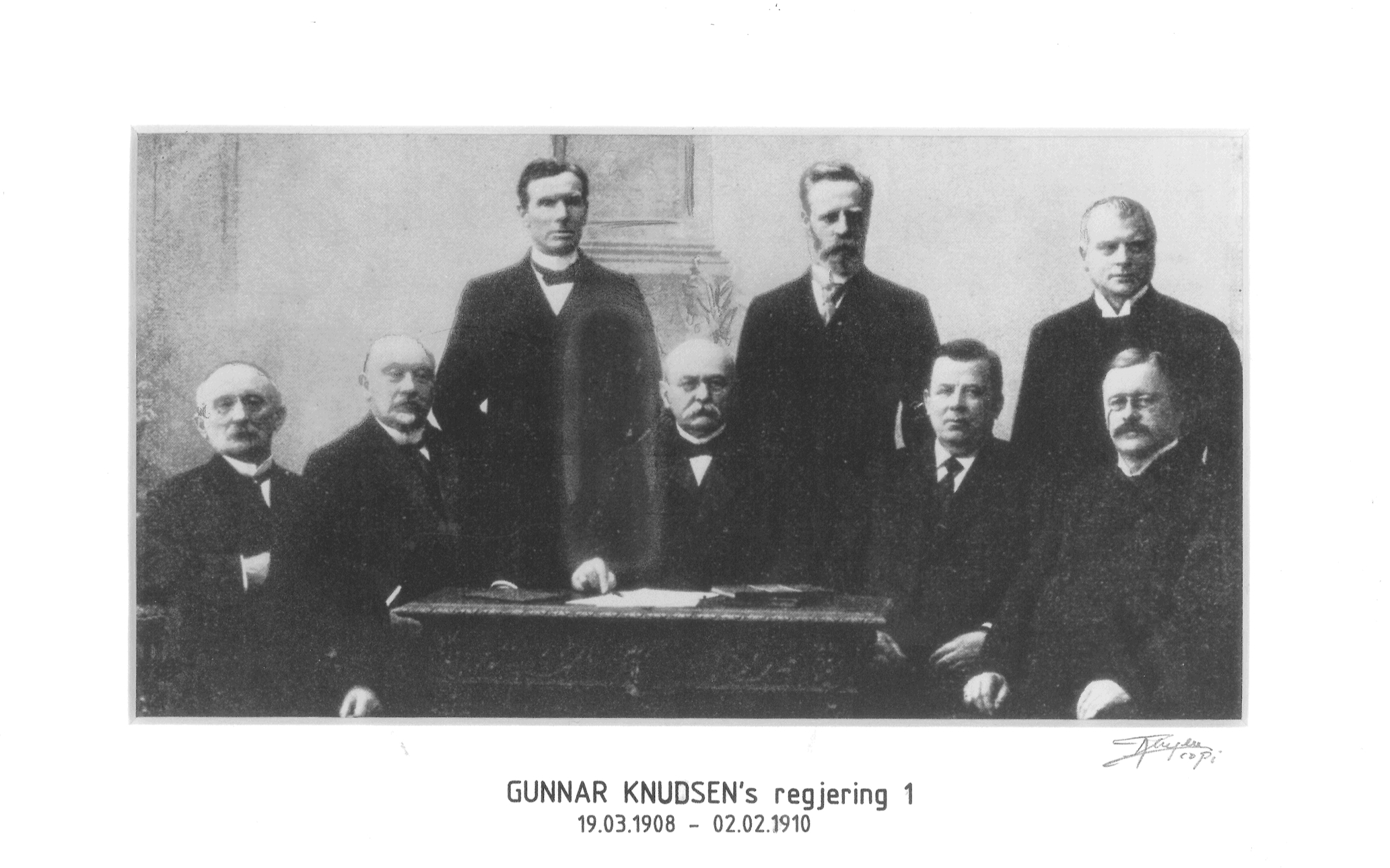
- Keilhau, first from the left.

Minister of Defence
- In office 31 January 1913 – 8 August 1914
- Prime Minister: Gunnar Knudsen
- Preceded by: Jens Bratlie
- Succeeded by: Christian T. Holtfodt

Personal details
- Born: Hans Vilhelm Dopp Mandall Keilhau; 18 August 1845 Bergen, Hordaland, Sweden-Norway
- Died: 31 January 1917 (aged 71) Christiania, Norway
- Party: Liberal

Military service
- Allegiance: Norway
- Branch/service: Norwegian Army
- Years of service: 1866–1917
- Rank: Major General

Hans Vilhelm Dopp Mandall Keilhau (18 August 1845 - 31 January 1917) was a Norwegian artillery officer and Government minister.

Keilhau was born in Bergen, Norway. He was the son of Lt. Col. William Christian Keilhau and was raised in a military family. He passed his college exam in 1870. He became an officer in 1866, Second lieutenant in 1872, First Lieutenant in 1876, Captain in 1888, Major in 1892 and Major General in 1900. He served as Minister of Defence during the administration of Prime Minister Gunnar Knudsen (1913-1914). Keilhau resigned at the outbreak of World War I.
