= Ole Jacob Broch =

Norwegian scientist and politician (1818–1889)

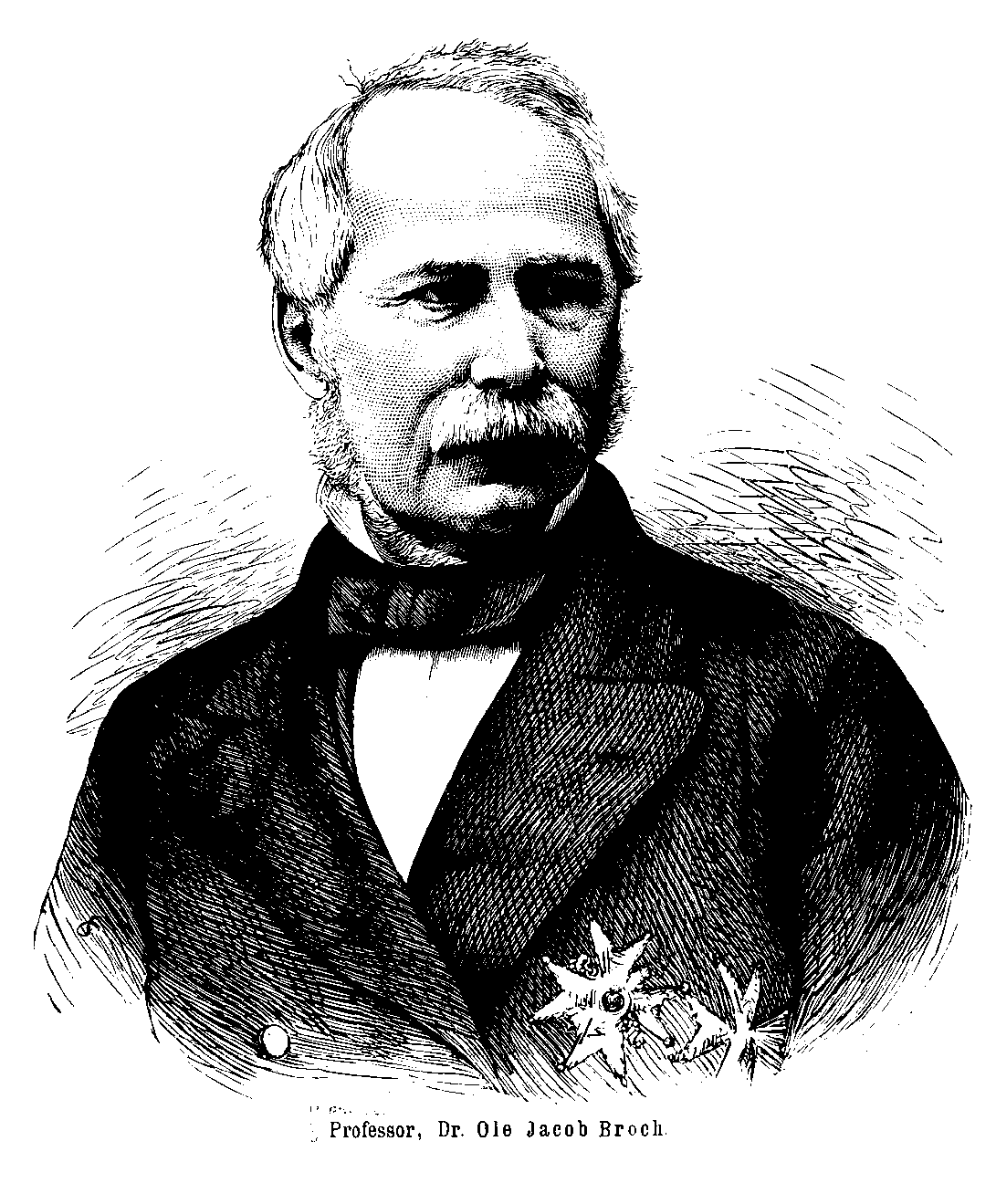
- Broch in 1877
- Born: 14 January 1818; Fredrikstad, Norway
- Died: 5 February 1889 (aged 71); Sevres, France
- Education: University of Oslo
- Scientific career
- Fields: Applications of elliptic functions
- Workplaces: Norwegian_Military_Academy; Norwegian_Military_College; International Bureau of Weights and Measures

Ole Jacob Broch (14 January 1818 – 5 February 1889) was a Norwegian mathematician, physicist, economist and government minister.

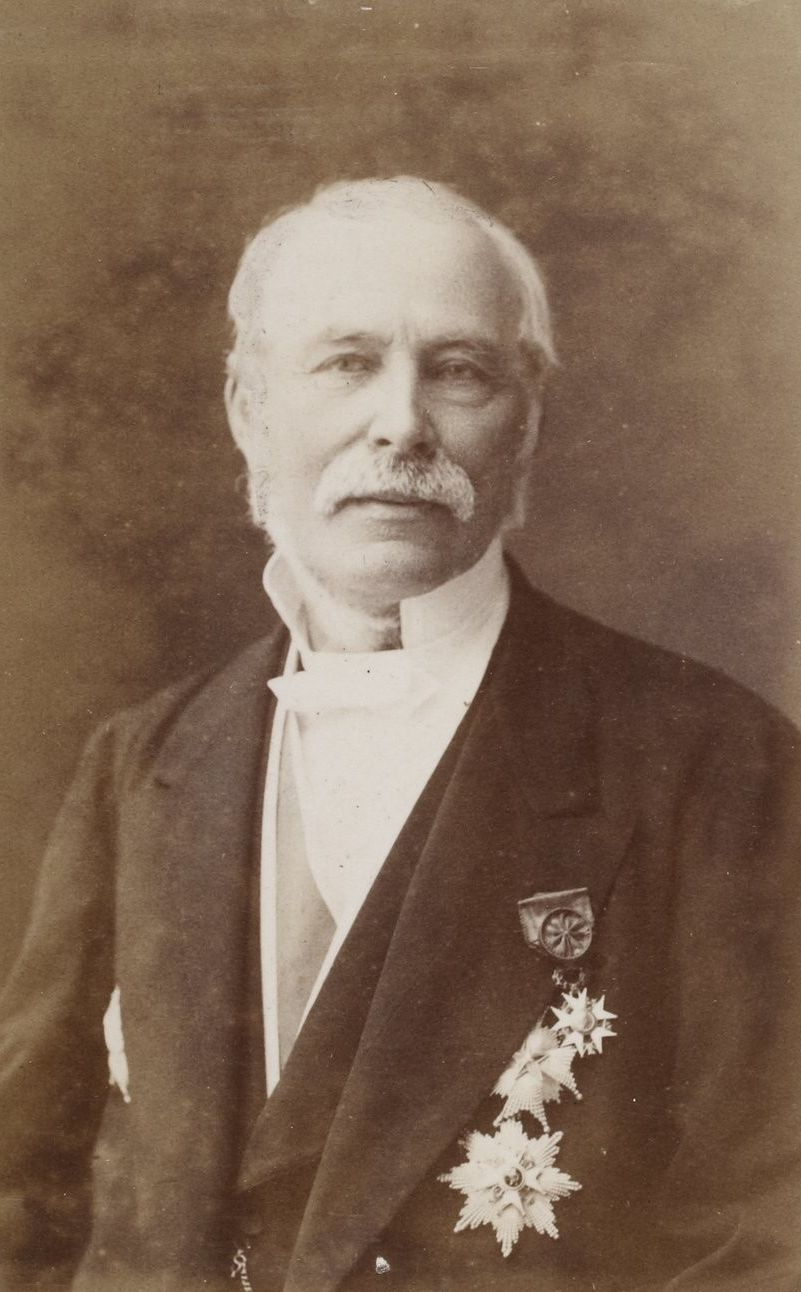
Ole Jacob Broch

== Biography ==
Broch was born at Fredrikstad in Østfold, Norway. He was the son of war commissary Johan Jørgen Broch (1791–1860) and Jensine Laurentze Bentzen (1790–1877) and the brother of the orientalist and linguist, Jens Peter Broch. He attended Kristiansand Cathedral School and showed a talent for mathematics at an early age. He attended the Overlærer Møller Institute in Christiania (now Oslo) and later studied at the University of Christiania (now University of Oslo). He also traveled abroad for studies in Paris, Berlin and Königsberg, during which he developed an interest in optics and statistics.

After returning to Norway, he worked with his friend and colleague Hartvig Nissen to found the school Hartvig Nissens skole in 1843, which were to have an emphasis on natural sciences and modern languages. After finishing his doctorate in 1847, he returned to a position at the university that he had resigned to work with Nissen. He also taught at the Military Academy, and in 1847 he founded the insurance company Gjensidige (under the name "Christiania almindelige, gjensidige Forsørgelsesanstalt"), which was Scandinavia's first life insurance company.

Broch entered politics as a local politician in Christiania, and in the period 1862–69 he represented the city in the Storting. In 1869, he was appointed Minister of the Navy in the first cabinet of Frederik Stang. After serving as a member of the Council of State Division in Stockholm in 1871–72, he returned as Minister of the Navy briefly in 1872. He resigned over differences with his colleagues about government ministers' access to the parliament.

After this his attention turned to international tasks. In 1879 he became a member, and in 1883 director of the International Bureau of Weights and Measures in Sèvres, France. This work took up much of the remainder of Broch's life, but in 1884 he was recalled to Norway to attempt to form a government. The constitutional crisis which caused the fall of the so-called April Ministerium of Christian Homann Schweigaard, led to the demand for a new prime minister. Broch failed in this attempt, and returned to France, where he died a few years later. He was buried at Var Frelsers gravlund in Oslo.

== Honors ==
Broch received several honours for his scientific and political work. He was a member of the Royal Norwegian Society of Sciences and Letters from 1849, and he received the Grand Cross of the Royal Norwegian Order of St. Olav in 1879.

Internationally, he was created grand officer of the French Légion d'honneur, and Commander Grand Cross of the Swedish Order of the Polar Star.

Brochøya, an island off the north coast of Nordaustlandet in Svalbard, was named after him.

== Selected works ==
- Lehrbuch der Mechanik, 1854
- Laerebog i Arithmetik og Algebraens Elementer, 1860
- Logarithme-Tabel med 5 Decimale, 1865
- Traité Élémentaire des Fonctions Elliptiques, 1867
