= Ole Wilhelm Erichsen =

Norwegian politician

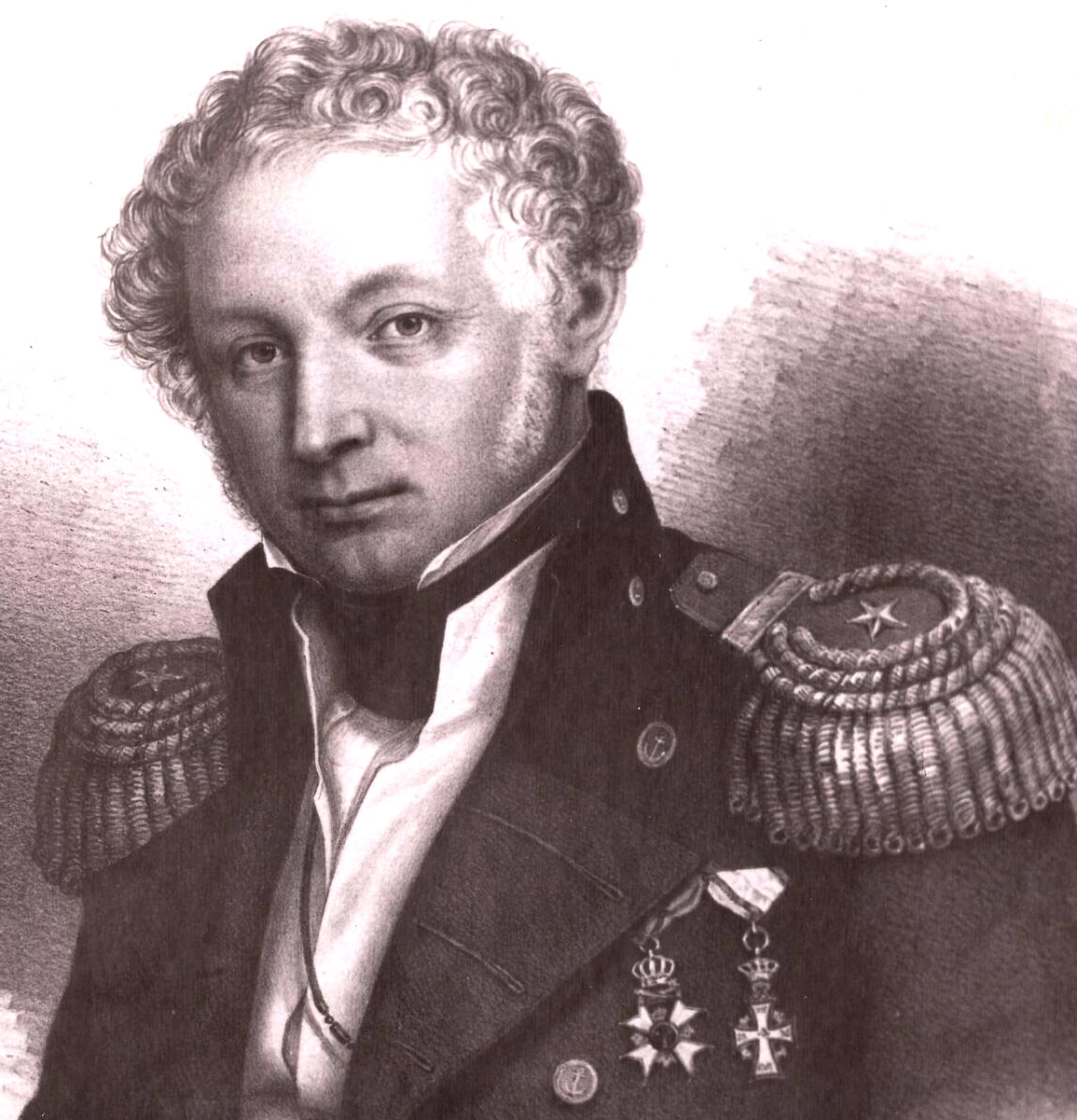

Ole Wilhelm Erichsen (19 February 1793 – 25 July 1860) was the Norwegian Minister of the Navy 1848-1852 and 1853–1856.

Erichsen was temporarily appointed councillor of state in interim government in Stockholm 1852–1853, and was member of the Council of State Division 1852–1853. Erichsen was a military captain before his public service career.
