= Nicolai Krog =

Norwegian government executive

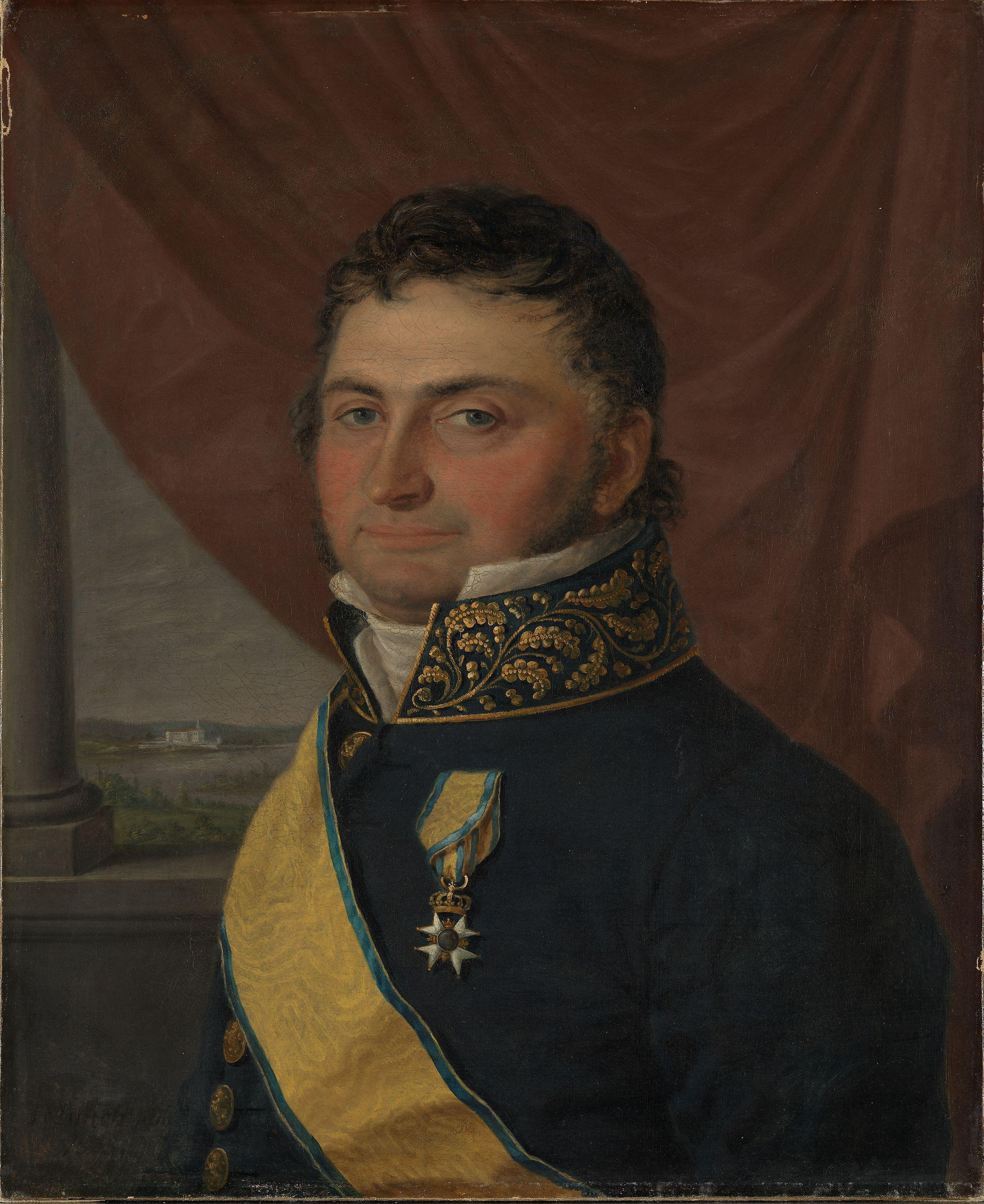
- Portrait by Jacob Munch, 1825

First Minister of Norway
- In office 1836–1855
- Monarchs: Charles III Johan; Oscar I
- Prime Minister: Severin Løvenskiold
- Governor: Count Wedel-Jarlsberg
- Preceded by: Jonas Collett
- Succeeded by: Jørgen Herman Vogt

Member of the Council of State Division in Stockholm
- In office 1825, 1828, 1832, 1835, 1838, 1841, 1848, – 1850

Member of the Interim Government in Stockholm
- In office 11 October 1852 – 12 April 1853

Personal details
- Born: Nicolai Johan Lohmann Krog; 6 July 1787 Drangedal, Norway
- Died: 15 October 1856 (aged 69) Christiania, Norway
- Resting place: Christ kirkegård in Oslo
- Spouse: Henriette Mathiesen
- Profession: Politician

Military service
- Branch/service: Army and Navy
- Years of service: 52
- Rank: Chief of the Ministry of the Army and Navy

Nicolai Johan Lohmann Krog (6 July 1787 – 15 October 1856) was First Minister of Norway (1836–1855). He also held several other ministerial posts in the period 1821–1855 including Chief of the Ministry of the Army and Navy.

== Early life and career ==
Krog was born in the Drangedal prestegjeld in Bratsberg county, Norway. He was the son of Andreas Christian von Krogh and Else Marie Poppe. He grow up at Gran Rectory in Hadeland (Gran prestegård på Hadeland) where his father was parish priest. Krog started his military education as a cadet at the Norwegian Land Cadet Corps in Christiania (now Oslo). He graduated as a second lieutenants in 1805.

In 1814, he was in the service of King Christian Frederik as adjutant in his general staff. Krog was promoted to major in 1815. From July 1816, he was commanding chief of the Royal Norwegian Military Academy. He was promoted to lieutenant colonel in 1817. In 1821, Krog was called to Stockholm as acting minister, and followed Crown Prince Oscar on his European tour to find a bride. He served as First Minister of Norway from 1836 to 1855. He resigned as a government minister in 1855 and died at Christiania in 1856 and was buried at Krist kirkegård.

Political offices
Preceded by Jonas Collett	First Minister of Norway; 1836–1855	Succeeded by Jørgen Herman Vogt
