= Palle Rømer Fleischer =

Norwegian Military Officer and Government Minister

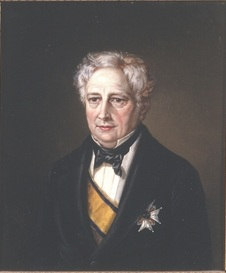
Palle Rømer Fleischer painted by Hedevig Lund.

Palle Rømer Fleischer (25 October 1781 – 4 April 1851) was a Norwegian Military Officer and Government Minister. He served as a representative at the Norwegian Constitutional Assembly.

Palle Rømer Fleischer was born at Moss in Østfold, Norway. During 1792, he was enrolled as a cadet and student at The Free Mathematics School in Christiania (now Oslo) (Den frie matematiske skole i Christiania) . In 1796, he became a Second Lieutenant in the Norwegian Ranger Corps (Norske Jægerkorps) where he served until 1802 when he was promoted to captain in the North Zealand Land Protection Regiment (Nordsjællandske landvernsregiment) in Denmark. He subsequently returned to Norway as a staff Captain in the Ranger Corps where he was named Company Commander in 1813. In 1814, he was appointed Major. From 1815 to 1817 he was Commander of Akershus Fortress. In 1817, he became Lieutenant Colonel. He was promoted to Adjutant General in 1823, Major General in 1825 and Lieutenant General in 1835. He was the Norwegian Minister of the Army in five periods between 1837 and 1848, and a member of the Council of State Division in Stockholm three times between 1839 and 1847.

He attended the Norwegian Constitutional Assembly at Eidsvoll during 1814 where he represented the Norske Jægerkorps along with Corporal Niels Fredriksen Dyhren where they both supported the independence party (Selvstendighetspartiet ).

== Related Reading ==
- Holme Jørn (2014) De kom fra alle kanter - Eidsvollsmennene og deres hus (Oslo: Cappelen Damm) ISBN 978-82-02-44564-5
