= Adolph Frederik Munthe =

Norwegian military officer and government official

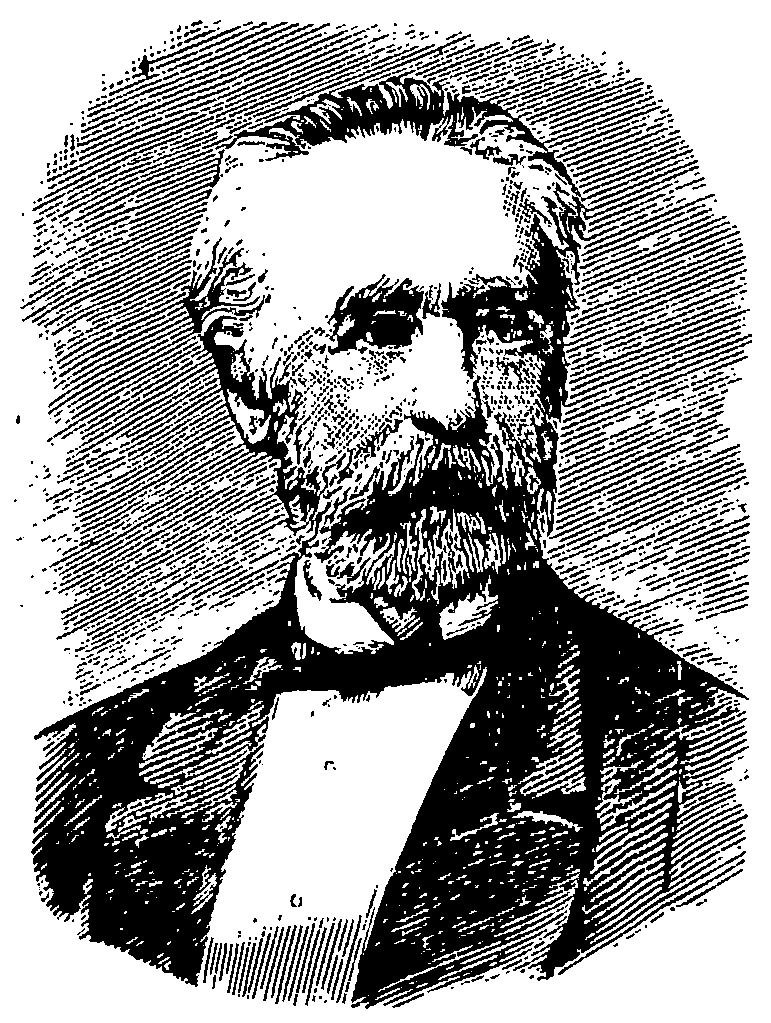
Adolph Frederik Munthe

Adolph Frederik Munthe (12 July 1817 – 7 September 1884) was a Norwegian military officer and government official. He was the Norwegian Minister of the Army 1877–1879, 1880–1881 and 1881–1884, as well as member of the Council of State Division in Stockholm 1879–1880 and 1881.
