= Jørgen Herman Vogt =

Norwegian politician (1784–1862)

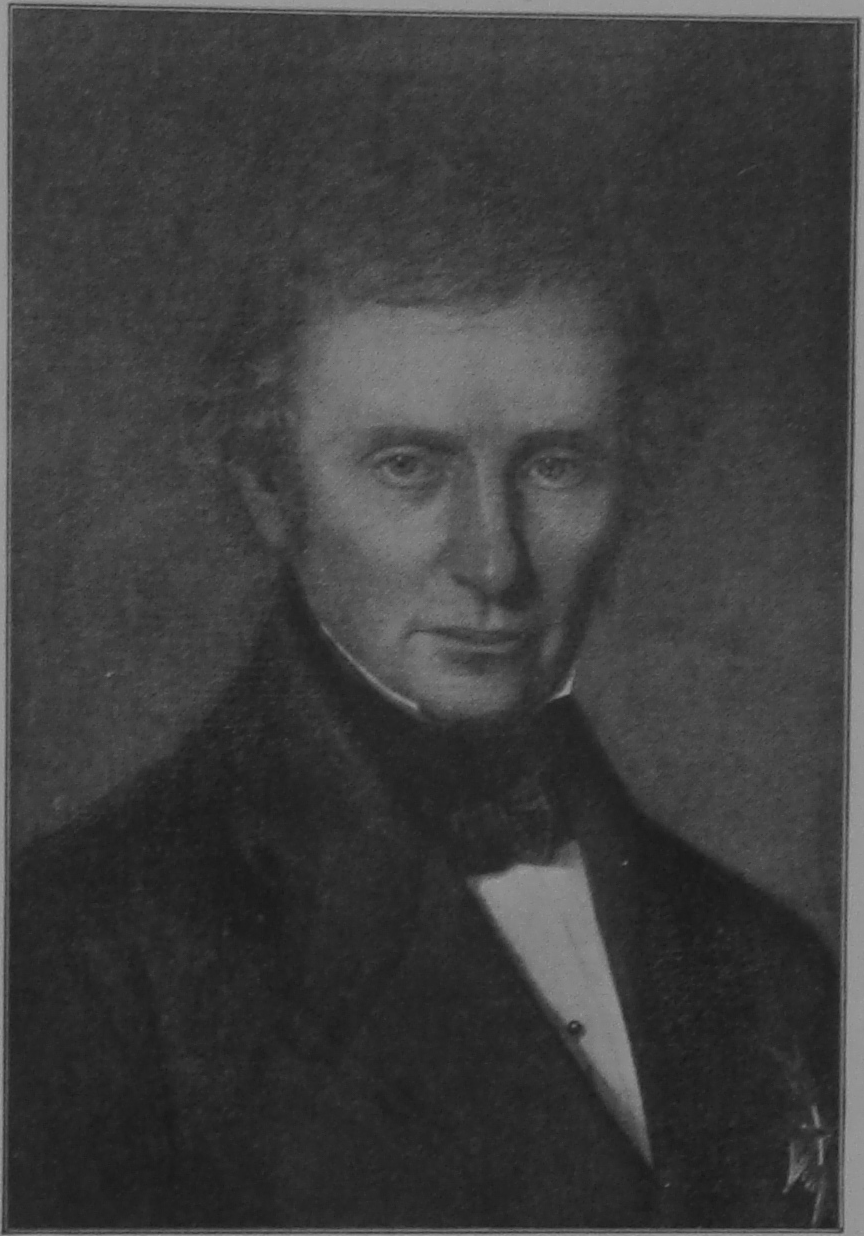
- Jørgen Herman Vogt in the year 1847.

First Minister of Norway
- In office 17 June 1856 – 16 December 1858
- Monarch: Oscar I
- Governor-General: Severin Løvenskiold
- Prime Minister: Severin Løvenskiold; Frederik Due
- Preceded by: Nicolai Krog
- Succeeded by: Hans Christian Petersen

Personal details
- Born: 21 July 1784 Bragernes, Drammen, Denmark-Norway
- Died: 12 January 1862 (aged 77) Christiania, Sweden-Norway
- Occupation: Politician

Jørgen Herman Vogt (21 July 1784 – 12 January 1862) was a Norwegian politician who served as First Minister of Norway from 1856 to 1858, during the personal union between Sweden and Norway. The first minister was subordinated to the governor and the viceroy in the political hierarchy, but for two periods when no governor or viceroy was present, he served as a de facto prime minister of Norway.

Vogt was born in the Bragernes neighborhood of Drammen in Buskerud, Norway. He was the son of timber merchant Niels Nielsen Vogt (1755-1809) and Abigael Monrad (1759-1812). Vogt was brought up as one of 13 siblings in Kongsberg. He entered the University of Copenhagen in 1800 and earned his law degree in 1806. Vogt succeeded his father was district stipendiary magistrate of Nordfjord in 1809.

He became a member of the finance committee of the Norwegian Constituent Assembly at Eidsvoll in 1814. In 1822, Vogt was appointed state secretary and chief of the central government office in Christiania (now Oslo). In 1825, he was appointed councillor of state and chief of the Ministry of the Army. When First Minister Nicolai Krog resigned in January 1855, Vogt succeeded him. Vogt resigned the position in December 1858.

Political offices
Preceded by Nicolai Johan Lohmann Krog	First Minister of Norway; 1855–1858	Succeeded by Hans Christian Petersen
