= Hans Christian Petersen =

Norwegian politician (1793–1862)

Hans C. Petersen MP
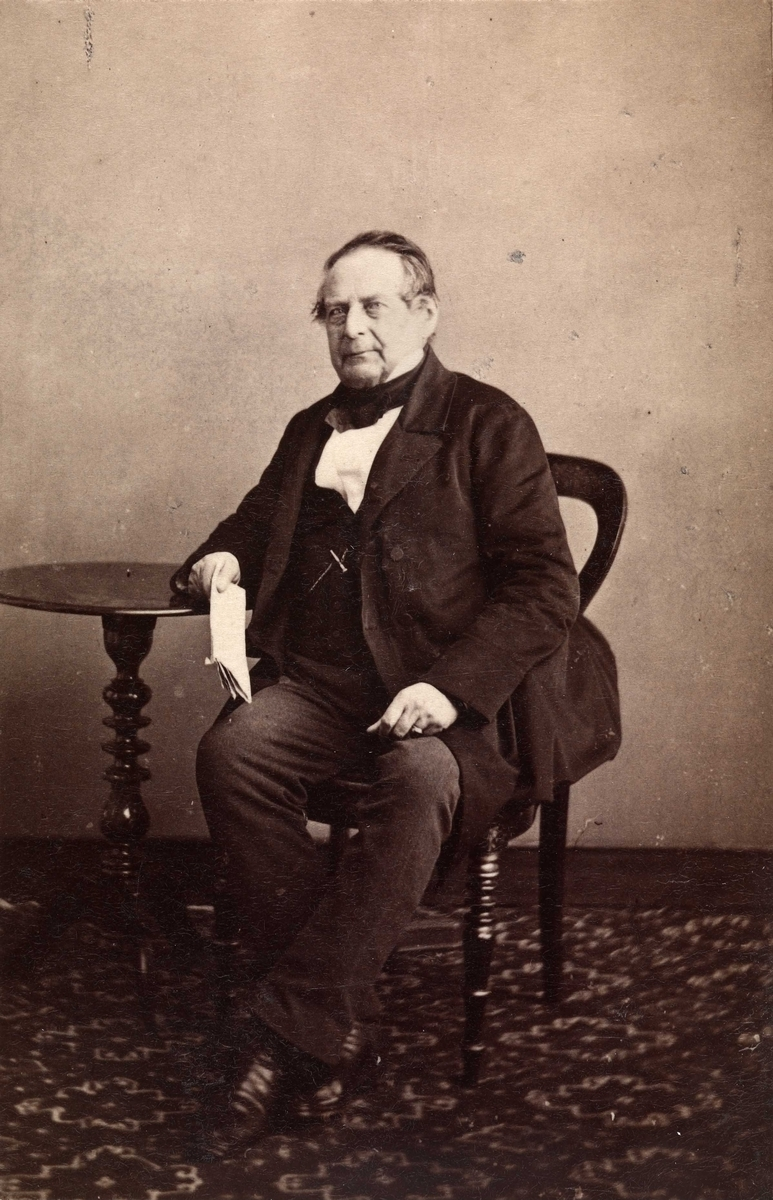
- Petersen in 1860

First Minister of Norway
- In office 1858–1861
- Monarchs: Oscar I Charles IV
- Preceded by: Jørgen Herman Vogt
- Succeeded by: Frederik Stang

Personal details
- Born: Hans Christian Petersen; 11 August 1793 Christianssand, Norway
- Died: 26 September 1862 (aged 69) Christiania, Norway
- Spouse: Kristine Marie Thrane
- Occupation: Politician
- Profession: Lawyer

Hans Christian Petersen (11 August 1793 – 26 September 1862) was a Norwegian politician and served as the de facto prime minister of Norway during the personal union of Sweden-Norway from 1858 to 1861.

== Early life ==
Petersen grew up in the southernmost city of Christianssand and graduated from the local cathedral school in 1810. He studied law at the University of Copenhagen and got his law degree there on 14 January 1814—the day the Peace Treaty of Kiel was signed, thus ending four hundred years of Danish-Norwegian union. Petersen now wanted to return home to participate in the fight for independence, but the sea route was blocked and on Swedish territory he would be demanded to swear allegiance to the Swedish King. Together with several others – one of them his later wife – he crossed by rowing boat to Sweden, before continuing over land to Christiania disguised as a coachman.

== Early career ==
In April 1814, Petersen became acting stipendiary magistrate in Kragerø. He was later in charge of the secretariat of the Naval Conscription Commissariat before becoming clerk of record at Norway’s new Supreme Court in June 1815. In 1817, Petersen received his licence as a barrister, and was able to run a lucrative legal practice for the next twenty years. From 1821, he was defence counsel at the Court of Impeachment, defending i.a. Councillors of State Thomas Fasting (1821) and Jonas Collett (1827) and Prime Minister Severin Løvenskiold (1836).

Petersen was an eloquent lawyer, something that also had to do with his experience as an actor in the Norwegian Dramatic Society until 1827. He spoke Latin fluently. In his 1844 textbook, author Henrik Wergeland used excerpts of Petersen’s defence speeches in the Court of Impeachment as examples of an eloquence “bordering on poetry”.

From 1828, Petersen was lawyer for the Bank of Norway department in Christiania, and from 1830 to 1834 acting Attorney General – an office he left due to disagreement on the salary. He then conducted individual court cases for ministries until 1837. After having defended Prime Minister Løvenskiold during impeachment prosecutions in 1836, he was offered to join the Government, but rejected. Instead he accepted the appointment as diocesan county governor in Christiania.

== Councillor ==
Two years later, Petersen accepted to become councillor of state in the Second Wedel Government (1836–1844), and was appointed chief of the Ministry of the Navy in October 1839. Apart from two periods at the Norwegian Council of State Division in Stockholm, he was chief of the Ministry of the Navy for the rest of this period.

During the Løvenskiold/Vogt Government (1844–1856), Petersen alternated between service at the Council of State Division in Stockholm and the responsibility as chief of the Ministries of the Navy, Justice, the Interior and the Army.

During the Vogt Government (1856–1858), Petersen alternated between the Council of State Division in Stockholm and the Ministries of the Army, the Navy and Justice. In early December 1858, he succeeded Jørgen Vogt as first minister in Christiania.

During the Sibbern/Birch/Motzfeldt Government (1858–1861), Petersen continued as the First Minister in Christiania. He now alternated between the responsibility as chief of the Ministries of Justice, the Navy and Auditing.

== Equality ==
Petersen was among those influencing King Oscar I to grant Norway a more equal status in the union with Sweden, but after the accession of King Carl XV in 1859, he found it difficult to cooperate with the monarch. Following the King’s expression of dissatisfaction at Petersen’s role in the debate on a new union commission, Petersen tendered his resignation and left the Government in December 1861.

Political offices
Preceded by Jørgen Herman Vogt	First Minister of Norway; 1858–1861	Succeeded by Frederik Stang
