= List of Norwegian cabinets =

This is a list of Norwegian cabinets with parties and Prime Ministers. Within coalition governments the parties are listed according to parliamentary representation with the most popular party first. The Prime Ministers' parties are italicized.

== Governments ==
=== Between 1814 and 1884 ===
With exception of the Cabinet of 1814, that was appointed by the then Crown-Prince of Denmark, Christian Fredrik, all the cabinets were appointed by the King of Sweden, who was also King of Norway.

Cabinet	Took office	Left office	Governor
Cabinet of 1814	2 March 1814	11 November 1814	
Wedel-Jarlsberg's First Cabinet	11 November 1814	19 September 1836	Johan Caspar Herman Wedel-Jarlsberg
Wedel-Jarlsberg's Second Cabinet	19 September 1836	8 March 1844	Johan Caspar Herman Wedel-Jarlsberg
Løvenskiold and Vogt's Cabinet	8 March 1844	17 June 1856	Severin Løvenskiold; Jørgen Herman Vogt
Stang's Cabinet	17 June 1856	11 October 1880	Frederik Stang
Selmer's Cabinet	11 October 1880	1 March 1884	Christian August Selmer
Schweigaard's Cabinet	3 April 1884	26 June 1884	Christian Homann Schweigaard

=== Between 1884 and 1945 ===
In 1884 the parliamentary system was introduced in Norway. Since then, all governments had to have support in the Parliament of Norway, and consisted of party member ministers.

Cabinet	Took office	Left office	Prime Minister	Party(s)
Sverdrup's Cabinet	26 June 1884	13 July 1889	Johan Sverdrup	Liberal
Stang's First Cabinet	13 July 1889	6 March 1891	Emil Stang	Conservative
Steen's First Cabinet	6 March 1891	2 May 1893	Johannes Steen	Liberal
Stang's Second Cabinet	2 May 1893	14 October 1895	Emil Stang	Conservative
Hagerup's First Cabinet	14 October 1895	17 February 1898	Francis Hagerup	Conservative, Moderate Liberal, Independent Liberals
Steen's Second Cabinet	17 February 1898	21 April 1902	Johannes Steen	Liberal
Blehr's First Cabinet	21 April 1902	22 October 1903	Otto Albert Blehr	Liberal
Hagerup's Second Cabinet	22 October 1903	11 March 1905	Francis Hagerup	Coalition Party, Liberal, Conservative
Michelsen's Cabinet	11 March 1905	23 October 1907	Christian Michelsen	Liberal, Conservative, Moderate Liberal
Løvland's Cabinet	23 October 1907	19 March 1908	Jørgen Løvland	Liberal, Liberal Left, Moderate Liberal
Knudsen's First Cabinet	19 March 1908	2 February 1910	Gunnar Knudsen	Liberal
Konow's Cabinet	2 February 1910	20 February 1912	Wollert Konow	Conservative, Liberal Left
Bratlie's Cabinet	20 February 1912	31 January 1913	Jens Bratlie	Conservative, Liberal Left
Knudsen's Second Cabinet	31 January 1913	21 June 1920	Gunnar Knudsen	Liberal
Bahr Halvorsen's First Cabinet	21 June 1920	22 June 1921	Otto Bahr Halvorsen	Conservative, Liberal Left
Blehr's Second Cabinet	22 June 1921	23 March 1923	Otto Albert Blehr	Liberal
Bahr Halvorsen's Second Cabinet	23 March 1923	30 May 1923	Otto Bahr Halvorsen	Conservative, Liberal Left
Berge's Cabinet	30 May 1923	25 July 1924	Abraham Berge	Conservative, Liberal Left
First cabinet Mowinckel	25 July 1924	5 March 1926	Johan Ludwig Mowinckel	Liberal
Lykke's Cabinet	5 March 1926	28 January 1928	Ivar Lykke	Conservative, Liberal Left
Hornsrud's Cabinet	28 January 1928	15 February 1928	Christopher Hornsrud	Labour
Mowinckel's Second Cabinet	15 February 1928	12 May 1931	Johan Ludwig Mowinckel	Liberal
Kolstad's Cabinet	12 May 1931	14 March 1932	Peder Kolstad	Agrarian
Hundseid's Cabinet	14 March 1932	3 March 1933	Jens Hundseid	Agrarian
Mowinckel's Third Cabinet	3 March 1933	20 March 1935	Johan Ludwig Mowinckel	Liberal
Nygaardsvold's Cabinet	20 March 1935	25 June 1945	Johan Nygaardsvold	Labour

=== De facto Governments during World War II ===
During the German occupation of Norway during World War II there were four cabinets, that ruled as part of Josef Terbovens administration of Norway. These Governments were the de facto ruling body of Norway during the war, though the Cabinet Nygaardsvold still held the de jure office, in exile in London, United Kingdom.

Cabinet	Took office	Left office	Prime Minister/Chairman	Party
Quisling's First Cabinet	9 April 1940	25 April 1940	Vidkun Quisling	National Unification
Administrative Council	25 April 1940	22 September 1940	Ingolf Elster Christensen	Independent
Terboven's Cabinet	22 September 1940	1 February 1942	Josef Terboven	National Unification
Quisling's Second Cabinet	1 February 1942	8 May 1945	Vidkun Quisling	National Unification

=== Governments since 1945 ===
Cabinet	In Office	Prime Minister	Party(s)	Election
Gerhardsen's First Cabinet	25 June 1945 – 5 November 1945	Einar Gerhardsen	Labour, Conservative, Liberal, Agrarian, Communist	–
Gerhardsen's Second Cabinet	5 November 1945 – 9 November 1951	Einar Gerhardsen	Labour	1945
Gerhardsen's Second Cabinet	5 November 1945 – 9 November 1951	Einar Gerhardsen	Labour	1949
Torp's Cabinet	9 November 1951 – 22 January 1955	Oscar Torp	Labour	–
Torp's Cabinet	9 November 1951 – 22 January 1955	Oscar Torp	Labour	1953
Gerhardsen's Third Cabinet	22 January 1955 – 28 August 1963	Einar Gerhardsen	Labour	–
Gerhardsen's Third Cabinet	22 January 1955 – 28 August 1963	Einar Gerhardsen	Labour	1957
Gerhardsen's Third Cabinet	22 January 1955 – 28 August 1963	Einar Gerhardsen	Labour	1961
Lyng's Cabinet	28 August 1963 – 25 September 1963	John Lyng	Conservative, Centre, Christian Democratic, Liberal	–
Gerhardsen's Fourth Cabinet	25 September 1963 – 12 October 1965	Einar Gerhardsen	Labour	–
Borten's Cabinet	12 October 1965 – 17 March 1971	Per Borten	Conservative, Liberal, Centre, Christian Democratic	1965
Borten's Cabinet	12 October 1965 – 17 March 1971	Per Borten	Conservative, Liberal, Centre, Christian Democratic	1969
Bratteli's First Cabinet	17 March 1971 – 17 October 1972	Trygve Bratteli	Labour	–
Korvald's Cabinet	17 October 1972 – 12 October 1973	Lars Korvald	Centre, Christian Democratic, Liberal	–
Bratteli's Second Cabinet	12 October 1973 – 15 January 1976	Trygve Bratteli	Labour	1973
Nordli's Cabinet	15 January 1976 – 4 February 1981	Odvar Nordli	Labour	–
Nordli's Cabinet	15 January 1976 – 4 February 1981	Odvar Nordli	Labour	1977
Brundtland's First Cabinet	4 February 1981 – 14 October 1981	Gro Harlem Brundtland	Labour	–
Willoch's First Cabinet	14 October 1981 – 8 June 1983	Kåre Willoch	Conservative	1981
Willoch's Second Cabinet	8 June 1983 – 9 May 1986	Kåre Willoch	Conservative, Christian Democratic, Centre	–
Willoch's Second Cabinet	8 June 1983 – 9 May 1986	Kåre Willoch	Conservative, Christian Democratic, Centre	1985
Brundtland's Second Cabinet	9 May 1986 – 16 October 1989	Gro Harlem Brundtland	Labour	–
Syse's Cabinet	16 October 1989 – 3 November 1990	Jan P. Syse	Conservative, Christian Democratic, Centre	1989
Brundtland's Third Cabinet	3 November 1990 – 25 October 1996	Gro Harlem Brundtland	Labour	–
Brundtland's Third Cabinet	3 November 1990 – 25 October 1996	Gro Harlem Brundtland	Labour	1993
Jagland's Cabinet	25 October 1996 – 17 October 1997	Thorbjørn Jagland	Labour	–
Bondevik's First Cabinet	17 October 1997 – 17 March 2000	Kjell Magne Bondevik	Christian Democratic, Centre, Liberal	1997
Stoltenberg's First Cabinet	17 March 2000 – 19 October 2001	Jens Stoltenberg	Labour	–
Bondevik's Second Cabinet	19 October 2001 – 17 October 2005	Kjell Magne Bondevik	Conservative, Christian Democratic, Liberal	2001
Stoltenberg's Second Cabinet	17 October 2005 – 16 October 2013	Jens Stoltenberg	Labour, Socialist Left, Centre	2005
Stoltenberg's Second Cabinet	17 October 2005 – 16 October 2013	Jens Stoltenberg	Labour, Socialist Left, Centre	2009
Solberg's Cabinet	16 October 2013 – 14 October 2021	Erna Solberg	Conservative, Progress (2013–2018); Conservative, Progress, Liberal (2018–2019); Conservative, Progress, Liberal, Christian Democratic (2019–2020); Conservative, Liberal, Christian Democratic (2020–2021)	2013
Solberg's Cabinet	16 October 2013 – 14 October 2021	Erna Solberg	Conservative, Progress (2013–2018); Conservative, Progress, Liberal (2018–2019); Conservative, Progress, Liberal, Christian Democratic (2019–2020); Conservative, Liberal, Christian Democratic (2020–2021)	2017
Støre's Cabinet	14 October 2021 – Incumbent	Jonas Gahr Støre	Labour, Centre (2021–2025); Labour (2025–)	2021
Støre's Cabinet	14 October 2021 – Incumbent	Jonas Gahr Støre	Labour, Centre (2021–2025); Labour (2025–)	2025

== Parties ==
The following parties have had cabinet seats.

- Communist Party (NKP) (Norges Kommunistiske Parti)
- Socialist Left Party (SV) (Sosialistisk Venstreparti)
- Labour Party (Ap) (Det norske Arbeiderparti)
- Centre Party (Sp) (Senterpartiet) – formerly known as the Agrarian Party, Bondepartiet
- Christian Democrats (KrF) (Kristelig Folkeparti)
- Liberal Party (V) (Venstre)
- Coalition Party (Samlingspartiet)
- Liberal Left Party (FV) (Frisinnede Venstre)
- Moderate Liberal Party (MV) (Moderate Venstre)
- Conservative Party (H) (Høyre)
- National Unification (NS) (Nasjonal Samling)

== See also ==
- Elections in Norway
- List of heads of government of Norway
