= Minister of Foreign Affairs (Norway) =

Norwegian government minister

Minister of Foreign Affairs of Norway
- Utenriksministeren

- Incumbent; Espen Barth Eide since 16 October 2023
- Ministry of Foreign Affairs
- Member of: Council of State
- Seat: Regjeringskvartalet, Oslo
- Nominator: Prime Minister
- Appointer: Monarch; With approval of Parliament
- Term length: No fixed length
- Constituting instrument: Constitution of Norway
- Formation: 7 June 1905
- First holder: Jørgen Løvland
- Succession: Second to Prime Minister
- Deputy: State secretaries at the Ministry of Foreign Affairs
- Website: Official website

The Minister of Foreign Affairs (Bokmål: Utenriksministeren, Nynorsk: Utanriksministeren) is a councilor of state and chief of the Norway's Ministry of Foreign Affairs. Since 16 October 2023, the position has been held by Espen Barth Eide of the Labour Party.

The Ministry of Foreign Affairs, based at Victoria Terrasse, Oslo, is responsible for Norway's relation with foreign countries, including diplomacy and diplomatic missions, trade, foreign aid and cooperation with international organisations. Except during the four in which a Deputy of the Prime Minister of Norway was appointed, the Minister of Foreign Affairs ranks second in the cabinet after the Prime Minister and is his deputy.

== History ==
The position was created on 7 June 1905, the day Norway declared independence from Sweden, with the Liberal Party's Jørgen Løvland as the inaugural. Forty people from five parties have held the position, all men excepting the current officeholder. From 1983 to 2013 the Minister of International Development, which was responsible for issues related to foreign aid, was attached to the Ministry of Foreign Affairs.

=== Notable officeholders ===
Halvard Lange (Labour) is the longest-serving, having held the position for more than eighteen years in four cabinets. The shortest-serving is the fellow party member, Edvard Bull, Sr., who held the position for the sixteen days that Hornsrud's Cabinet lasted. Johan Ludwig Mowinckel (Liberal) was appointed four times as minister. Three people have sat concurrently as Prime Minister and Minister of Foreign Affairs: Løvland, Mowinckel and Ivar Lykke (Conservative). Three officeholders would later become Prime Minister: Løvland, Mowinckel and Kjell Magne Bondevik (Christian Democratic). Two former Prime Ministers have held the office: John Lyng (Conservative) and Thorbjørn Jagland (Labour). Trygve Lie (Labour) resigned from the office to become the inaugural Secretary-General of the United Nations. Two people have died while in office: Knut Frydenlund and Johan Jørgen Holst (both Labour).

=== List of ministers ===
The following lists the Ministers of Foreign Affairs, their party, date of assuming and leaving office, their tenure in years and days, and the cabinet they served in.

Key

Agrarian/Centre Party
Christian Democratic Party
Conservative Party
Labour Party
Liberal Party

Portrait	Name	Party	Took office	Left office	Tenure	Cabinet	Ref
	Jørgen Løvland	Liberal	7 June 1905	19 March 1908	2 years, 286 days	Michelsen; Løvland	
	Wilhelm Christophersen	Liberal	19 March 1908	2 February 1910	1 year, 320 days	Knudsen I	
	Johannes Irgens	Conservative	2 February 1910	31 January 1913	2 years, 364 days	Konow; Bratlie	
	Nils Claus Ihlen	Liberal	31 January 1913	21 June 1920	7 years, 142 days	Knudsen II	
	Christian Fredrik Michelet	Conservative	21 June 1920	22 June 1921	1 year, 1 day	Bahr Halvorsen I	
	Arnold C. Ræstad	Liberal	22 June 1921	31 May 1922	343 days	Blehr II	
	Johan Ludwig Mowinckel	Liberal	31 May 1922	6 March 1923	279 days	Blehr II	
	Christian Fredrik Michelet	Conservative	6 March 1923	25 July 1924	1 year, 141 days	Bahr Halvorsen II; Berge	
	Johan Ludwig Mowinckel	Liberal	25 July 1924	5 March 1926	1 year, 223 days	Mowinckel I	
	Ivar Lykke	Conservative	5 March 1926	28 January 1928	1 year, 323 days	Lykke	
	Edvard Bull, Sr.	Labour	28 January 1928	15 February 1928	18 days	Hornsrud	
	Johan Ludwig Mowinckel	Liberal	15 February 1928	12 May 1931	3 years, 86 days	Mowinckel II	
	Birger Braadland	Agrarian	12 May 1931	3 March 1933	1 year, 295 days	Kolstad; Hundseid	
	Johan Ludwig Mowinckel	Liberal	3 March 1933	20 March 1935	2 years, 17 days	Mowinckel III	
	Halvdan Koht	Labour	20 March 1935	19 November 1940	5 years, 244 days	Nygaardsvold	
	Trygve Lie	Labour	19 November 1940	2 February 1946	5 years, 75 days	Nygaardsvold; Gerhardsen I-II	
	Halvard Lange	Labour	2 February 1946	28 August 1963	17 years, 207 days	Gerhardsen II; Torp; Gerhardsen III	
	Erling Wikborg	Christian Democratic	28 August 1963	25 September 1963	28 days	Lyng	
	Halvard Lange	Labour	25 September 1963	12 October 1965	2 years, 17 days	Gerhardsen IV	
	John Lyng	Conservative	12 October 1965	22 May 1970	4 years, 222 days	Borten	
	Svenn Stray	Conservative	22 May 1970	17 March 1971	299 days	Borten	
	Andreas Cappelen	Labour	17 March 1971	18 October 1972	1 year, 215 days	Bratteli I	
	Dagfinn Vårvik	Centre	18 October 1972	16 October 1973	363 days	Korvald	
	Knut Frydenlund	Labour	16 October 1973	14 October 1981	7 years, 363 days	Bratteli II; Nordli; Brundtland I	
	Svenn Stray	Conservative	14 October 1981	9 May 1986	4 years, 207 days	Willoch I-II	
	Knut Frydenlund	Labour	9 May 1986	26 February 1987	262 days	Brundtland II	
	Thorvald Stoltenberg	Labour	9 March 1987	16 October 1989	2 years, 221 days	Brundtland II	
	Kjell Magne Bondevik	Christian Democratic	16 October 1989	3 November 1990	1 year, 18 days	Syse	
	Thorvald Stoltenberg	Labour	3 November 1990	2 April 1993	2 years, 151 days	Brundtland III	
	Johan Jørgen Holst	Labour	2 April 1993	13 January 1994	286 days	Brundtland III	
	Bjørn Tore Godal	Labour	24 January 1994	17 October 1997	3 years, 266 days	Brundtland III; Jagland	
	Knut Vollebæk	Christian Democratic	17 October 1997	17 March 2000	2 years, 152 days	Bondevik I	
	Thorbjørn Jagland	Labour	17 March 2000	19 October 2001	1 year, 216 days	Stoltenberg I	
	Jan Petersen	Conservative	19 October 2001	17 October 2005	3 years, 363 days	Bondevik II	
	Jonas Gahr Støre	Labour	17 October 2005	21 September 2012	6 years, 340 days	Stoltenberg II	
	Espen Barth Eide	Labour	21 September 2012	16 October 2013	1 year, 25 days	Stoltenberg II	
	Børge Brende	Conservative	16 October 2013	20 October 2017	4 years, 4 days	Solberg	
	Ine Eriksen Søreide	Conservative	20 October 2017	14 October 2021	3 years, 359 days	Solberg	
	Anniken Huitfeldt	Labour	14 October 2021	16 October 2023	2 years, 2 days	Støre	
	Espen Barth Eide	Labour	16 October 2023	present	2 years, 356 days	Støre	

== Minister of European Affairs ==
The Minister of European Affairs was responsible for cases related to the EEA and Norway's relation with the EU. The post was established on 16 October 2013 by the Solberg Cabinet, which at the time consisted of the Conservatives and the Progress Party. It was abolished on 17 January 2018 when the Liberals joined the Cabinet.

=== Key ===
Conservative Party

=== Ministers ===
Portrait	Name	Party	Took office	Left office	Tenure	Cabinet
	Vidar Helgesen	Conservative	16 October 2013	16 December 2015	2 years, 61 days	Solberg
	Elisabeth Aspaker	Conservative	16 December 2015	20 December 2016	1 year, 4 days	Solberg
	Frank Bakke-Jensen	Conservative	20 December 2016	20 October 2017	304 days	Solberg
	Marit Berger Røsland	Conservative	20 October 2017	17 January 2018	89 days	Solberg
