= Bahr Halvorsen's Second Cabinet =

Government of Norway in 1923

- Cabinet of Norway

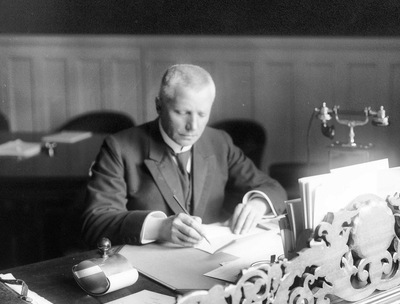
- Prime Minister Bahr Halvorsen.
- Date formed: 6 March 1923
- Date dissolved: 30 May 1923 (Note: Bahr Halvorsen died on 23 May, but Christian F. Michelet was acting prime minister until Abraham Berge was appointed Bahr Halvorsen's successor a week later.)

People and organisations
- Head of state: Haakon VII of Norway
- Head of government: Otto Bahr Halvorsen
- No. of ministers: 9
- Member party: Conservative Party; Free-minded Liberal Party
- Status in legislature: Minority

History
- Incoming formation: Change of government after crisis
- Outgoing formation: Death of Prime Minister
- Legislature term: 1922–1925
- Predecessor: Blehr's Second Cabinet
- Successor: Berge's Cabinet

Bahr Halvorsen's Second Cabinet governed Norway between 6 March 1923 and 30 May 1923. It ceased to exist after the death of Prime Minister Otto Bahr Halvorsen. It had the following composition:

== Cabinet members ==
Cabinet
Portfolio	Minister	Took office	Left office	Party
Prime Minister; Minister of Justice and the Police (Note: Odd Klingenberg was acting justice minister until the appointment of Christian L. Rolfsen.)	Otto Bahr Halvorsen (Note: Bahr Halvorsen was on leave from 24 March until his death, while Christian F. Michelet was acting prime minister from 24 March to 30 May.)	6 March 1923	23 May 1923	Conservative
Minister of Foreign Affairs	Christian Fredrik Michelet	6 March 1923	30 May 1923	Conservative
Minister of Finance and Customs	Abraham Berge	6 March 1923	30 May 1923	Free-minded Liberal
Minister of Defence	Karl Wilhelm Wefring	6 March 1923	30 May 1923	Free-minded Liberal
Minister of Agriculture	Anders Venger	6 March 1923	30 May 1923	Conservative
Minister of Education and Church Affairs	Ivar B. Sælen	6 March 1923	30 May 1923	Conservative
Minister of Trade	Johan Henrik Rye Holmboe	6 March 1923	30 May 1923	Free-minded Liberal
Minister of Labour	Cornelius Middelthon	6 March 1923	30 May 1923	Conservative
Minister of Social Affairs	Odd Klingenberg	6 March 1923	30 May 1923	Conservative

== State Secretary ==
Not to be confused with the modern title State Secretary. The old title State Secretary, used between 1814 and 1925, is now known as Secretary to the Government (Regjeringsråd).

State Secretary	Period
Hans Severin Fürst	
