= Blehr's Second Cabinet =

Government of Norway from 1921 to 1923

- Cabinet of Norway

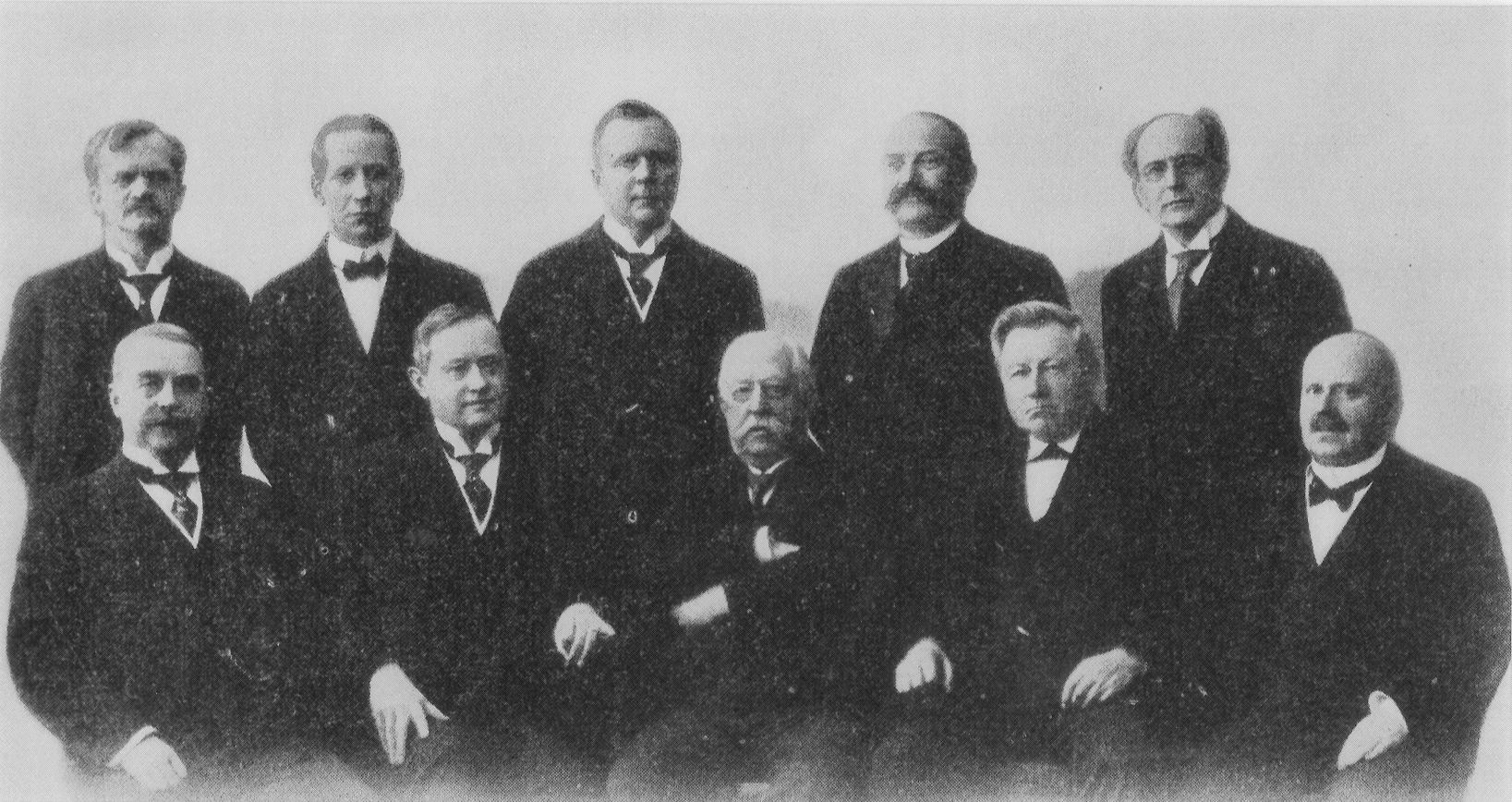
- Front (left to right): Ivar Aavatsmark, Arnold C. Ræstad, Prime Minister Otto Blehr, Martin Olsen Nalum and Olaf Amundsen. Rear (left to right): Rasmus Olai Mortensen, Håkon Five, Johan Ludwig Mowinckel, Ole Monsen Mjelde and Lars Oftedal.
- Date formed: 22 June 1921
- Date dissolved: 6 March 1923

People and organisations
- Head of state: Haakon VII of Norway
- Head of government: Otto Blehr
- No. of ministers: 11
- Member party: Liberal Party
- Status in legislature: Minority

History
- Election: 1921
- Legislature term: 1922–1925
- Predecessor: Bahr Halvorsen's First Cabinet
- Successor: Bahr Halvorsen's Second Cabinet

Blehr's Second Cabinet was the government of Norway between 22 June 1921 and 6 March 1923. It was a Liberal Party cabinet led by Prime Minister Otto Blehr, who also served as Minister of Finance. The cabinet handed in its resignation on 2 March 1923, which was accepted and taken into effect four days later. The reason was that there was a majority against its proposal to increase wine and spirit imports from Spain and Portugal.

== Cabinet members ==
Cabinet
Portfolio	Minister	Took office	Left office	Party
Prime Minister; Minister of Finance and Customs	Otto Blehr	22 June 1921	6 March 1923	Liberal
Minister of Foreign Affairs	Arnold C. Ræstad	22 June 1921	31 May 1922	Liberal
Minister of Foreign Affairs	Johan Ludwig Mowinckel	31 May 1922	6 March 1923	Liberal
Minister of Justice and the Police	Olaf Amundsen	22 June 1921	24 August 1922	Liberal
Minister of Justice and the Police	Arnold Holmboe	24 August 1922	6 March 1923	Liberal
Minister of Defence	Ivar Aavatsmark	22 June 1921	6 March 1923	Liberal
Minister of Agriculture	Martin Olsen Nalum (acting)	22 June 1921	26 July 1921	Liberal
Minister of Agriculture	Håkon Five	26 July 1921	6 March 1923	Liberal
Minister of Education and Church Affairs	Martin Olsen Nalum	22 June 1921	6 March 1923	Liberal
Minister of Trade	Johan Ludwig Mowinckel	22 June 1921	20 October 1922	Liberal
Minister of Trade	Lars Oftedal	20 October 1922	6 March 1923	Liberal
Minister of Labour	Ole Monsen Mjelde	22 June 1921	6 March 1923	Liberal
Minister of Social Affairs	Lars Oftedal	22 June 1921	20 October 1922	Liberal
Minister of Social Affairs	Rasmus Olai Mortensen	20 October 1922	6 March 1923	Liberal
Minister of Provisioning	Ole Monsen Mjelde (acting)	22 June 1921	23 July 1921	Liberal
Minister of Provisioning	Rasmus Olai Mortensen	23 July 1921	1 November 1922	Liberal
