= Bahr Halvorsen's First Cabinet =

Government of Norway from 1920 to 1921

- Cabinet of Norway

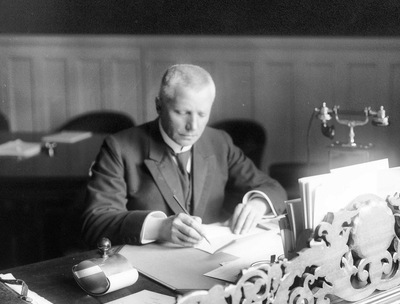
- Prime Minister Bahr Halvorsen.
- Date formed: 21 June 1920
- Date dissolved: 22 June 1921

People and organisations
- Head of state: Haakon VII of Norway
- Head of government: Otto Bahr Halvorsen
- No. of ministers: 10
- Member party: Conservative Party; Free-minded Liberal Party
- Status in legislature: Minority

History
- Incoming formation: Change of government after crisis
- Outgoing formation: Government crisis
- Legislature term: 1922–1925
- Predecessor: Knudsen's Second Cabinet
- Successor: Blehr's Second Cabinet

Bahr Halvorsen's First Cabinet governed Norway between 21 June 1920 and 22 June 1921. The Conservative and Free-minded Liberal Party cabinet was led by Otto Bahr Halvorsen. It had the following composition:

== Cabinet members ==
Cabinet
Portfolio	Minister	Took office	Left office	Party
Prime Minister; Minister of Justice and the Police	Otto Bahr Halvorsen	21 June 1920	22 June 1921	Conservative
Minister of Foreign Affairs	Christian Fredrik Michelet	21 June 1920	22 June 1921	Conservative
Minister of Finance and Customs	Edvard Hagerup Bull	21 June 1920	22 June 1921	Conservative
Minister of Defence	Karl Wilhelm Wefring	21 June 1920	22 June 1921	Free-minded Liberal
Minister of Agriculture	Gunder Anton Jahren	21 June 1920	22 June 1921	Conservative
Minister of Education and Church Affairs	Nils Riddervold Jensen	21 June 1920	22 June 1921	Conservative
Minister of Trade	Gerdt Henrik M. Bruun	21 June 1920	22 June 1921	Conservative
Minister of Labour	Cornelius Middelthon	21 June 1920	22 June 1921	Conservative
Minister of Social Affairs	Odd Klingenberg	21 June 1920	22 June 1921	Conservative
Minister of Provisioning	Johan Henrik Rye Holmboe	21 June 1920	22 June 1921	Free-minded Liberal

== State Secretary ==
Not to be confused with the modern title State Secretary. The old title State Secretary, used between 1814 and 1925, is now known as Secretary to the Government (Regjeringsråd).

State Secretary	Period
Nils Otto Hesselberg	21 June 1920 - 1 October 1920
Hans Severin Fürst	1 October 1920 - 22 June 1921
