= Nalum =

Nalum may refer to:

- Nalum (Norway), an area in Larvik, Norway
- Martin Olsen Nalum, Norwegian educator and politician

== See also ==
- Ngalum
