= Knudsen's Second Cabinet =

Government of Norway from 1913 to 1920

- Cabinet of Norway

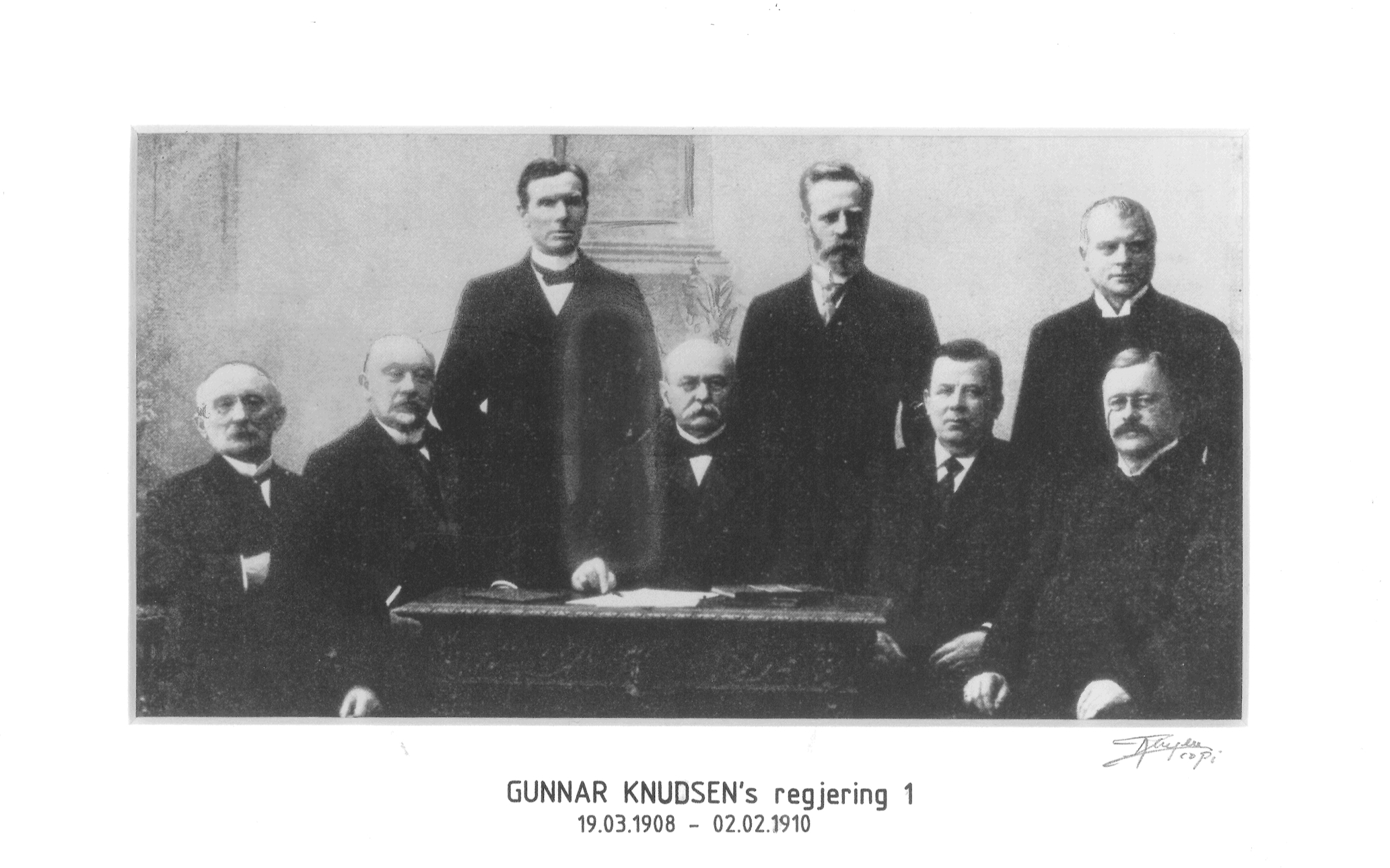
- Knudsen's second cabinet in 1913. Note: The caption is incorrect with it saying it's the first cabinet.
- Date formed: 31 January 1913
- Date dissolved: 21 June 1920

People and organisations
- Head of state: Haakon VII of Norway
- Head of government: Gunnar Knudsen
- Total no. of members: 11
- Member party: Liberal Party
- Status in legislature: Minority

History
- Incoming formation: 1912 election
- Outgoing formation: Government crisis
- Elections: 1912; 1915; 1918
- Legislature terms: 1913–1916; 1916–1919; 1919–1922
- Predecessor: Bratlie's Cabinet
- Successor: Bahr Halvorsen's First Cabinet

Knudsen's Second Cabinet was the government of Norway from 31 January 1913 to 21 June 1920, led by prime minister Gunnar Knudsen. It was a Liberal Party minority government. It was formed following Jens Bratlie's defeat in the 1912 election.

Knudsen had originally asked king Haakon VII to resign on 4 February 1919 following a majority vote against the cabinet's proposal of a tighter economic policy, but the king advised his cabinet to continue on 20 February. All except three ministers, withdrew their resignations. The same issue became the reason for the cabinet's second resignation on 16 June 1920, and this time the king accepted it. The resignation was accepted on 19 June, and came into force two days later, when the cabinet was succeeded by Bahr Halvorsen's First Cabinet.

== Cabinet composition ==
Cabinet
Portfolio	Minister	Took office	Left office	Party
Prime Minister; Minister of Auditing (until 1 July 1918)	Gunnar Knudsen	31 January 1913	21 June 1920	Liberal
Minister of Foreign Affairs	Nils Claus Ihlen	31 January 1913	21 June 1920	Liberal
Minister of Finance and Customs	Anton Omholt	31 January 1913	16 June 1920 (Note: Otto Blehr was acting minister from 23 April to 16 July 1915, and Gunnar Knudsen from 12 December 1919 to 16 June 1920.)	Liberal
Minister of Defence	Hans Vilhelm Keilhau	31 January 1913	8 August 1914	Liberal
Minister of Defence	Christian Theodor Holtfodt	8 August 1914	20 February 1919	Liberal
Minister of Defence	Rudolf Peersen	20 February 1919	17 June 1919	Liberal
Minister of Defence	Ivar Aavatsmark	17 June 1919	21 June 1920	Liberal
Minister of Justice and the Police	Lars Abrahamsen	31 January 1913	26 July 1916	Liberal
Minister of Justice and the Police	Andreas Urbye	26 July 1916	1 May 1917	Liberal
Minister of Justice and the Police	Otto Blehr	1 May 1917	21 June 1920	Liberal
Minister of Education and Church Affairs	Aasulv Bryggesaa	31 January 1913	26 October 1915	Liberal
Minister of Education and Church Affairs	Jørgen Løvland	26 October 1915	21 June 1920	Liberal
Minister of Labour	Andreas Urbye	31 January 1913	26 July 1916	Liberal
Minister of Labour	Martin Olsen Nalum	26 July 1916	10 May 1920	Liberal
Minister of Labour	Ole Monsen Mjelde	10 May 1920	21 June 1920	Liberal
Minister of Social Affairs	Johan Castberg	3 June 1913	22 April 1914	Liberal
Minister of Social Affairs	Kristian Friis Petersen	22 April 1914	1 October 1916	Liberal
Minister of Social Affairs	Lars Abrahamsen	1 October 1916	20 February 1919	Liberal
Minister of Social Affairs	Paal Berg	20 February 1919	21 June 1920	Liberal
Minister of Agriculture	Gunnar Knudsen	31 January 1913	12 December 1919	Liberal
Minister of Agriculture	Håkon Five	12 December 1919	21 June 1920	Liberal
Minister of Trade and Industry (Note: The Ministry of Trade was reorganized as the Ministry of Social Affairs from 3 June 1913. The Ministry of Trade's affairs were divided between the new Ministry of Social Affairs and the Ministry of Foreign Affairs. However, following strong pressure from the trade industry, a new Ministry of Trade was re-established under the name of the Ministry of Trade and Maritime Affairs, from 1 October 1916.)	Johan Castberg	31 January 1913	3 June 1913	Liberal
Minister of Trade and Industry	Kristian Friis Petersen	1 October 1916	20 February 1919	Liberal
Minister of Trade and Industry	Birger Stuevold-Hansen	20 February 1919	21 June 1920	Liberal
Minister of Provisioning	Oddmund Vik	26 July 1916	28 November 1917	Liberal
Minister of Provisioning	Birger Stuevold-Hansen	28 November 1917	20 February 1919	Liberal
Minister of Provisioning	Håkon Five	20 February 1919	21 June 1920	Liberal
Minister of Industrial Provisioning	Torolf Prytz	30 April 1917	5 July 1918 (Note: Nils Claus Ihlen was acting minister from 5 to 21 July 1918.)	Liberal
Minister of Industrial Provisioning	Haakon Hauan	21 July 1918	1 May 1920	Liberal
