= Ivar Lykke (politician) =

Norwegian politician (1872–1949)

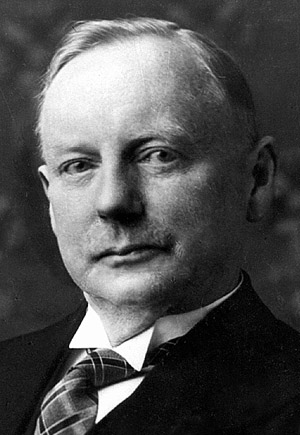

Prime Minister of Norway
- In office 5 March 1926 – 28 January 1928
- Monarch: Haakon VII
- Preceded by: J. L. Mowinckel
- Succeeded by: Christopher Hornsrud

Minister of Foreign Affairs
- In office 5 March 1926 – 28 January 1928
- Prime Minister: Himself
- Preceded by: J. L. Mowinckel
- Succeeded by: Edvard Bull, Sr.

Member of the Storting
- In office 1 January 1916 – 4 December 1945
- Constituency: Trondheim and Levanger

Leader of the Conservative Party
- In office 1923–1926
- Preceded by: Otto B. Halvorsen
- Succeeded by: C. J. Hambro

President of the Storting
- In office 1 January 1919 – 31 December 1927 Serving with Gunnar Knudsen, Anders Buen, Ivar P. Tveiten, Otto B. Halvorsen, Gunder A. Jahren and C. J. Hambro
- Prime Minister: Gunnar Knudsen; Otto B. Halvorsen; Otto Blehr; Abraham Berge; J. L. Mowinckel
- Preceded by: Martin Olsen Nalum; Ivar P. Tveiten; J. L. Mowinckel
- Succeeded by: C. J. Hambro

Personal details
- Born: 9 January 1872 Trondhjem, Sør-Trøndelag, Sweden–Norway (present day Norway)
- Died: 4 December 1949 (aged 77) Trondheim, Sør-Trøndelag, Norway
- Party: Conservative
- Spouse: Petra Anker Bachke
- Profession: Merchant

Ivar Lykke (9 January 1872 in Trondheim – 4 December 1949 in Trondheim) was a Norwegian politician from the Conservative Party, who served as the prime minister of Norway from 1926 to 1928. He was also president of the Storting from 1919 to 1927.

== World War Two ==
Lykke was a member of the parliament's presidium in 1940; he stepped in (according to mandate) for president in exile, C. J. Hambro.

On 27 June 1940 Lykke, and others of parliament's presidium, signed an appeal to King Haakon VII, about [the desire for] his abdication. (The presidium back then consisted of the presidents and vicepresidents of parliament, Odelstinget and Lagtinget.)

== 1945 ==
After World War Two, he and others were criticized (for actions in 1940) by a parliamentary fact-finding commission.

== Visit by King Haakon ==
By 1947 he was still being treated for cancer.

During King Haakon's visit that year to Trondheim, he diverged from his official program to visit Lykke. Lykke said "Thou can believe that we had it difficult here in Norway in the summer of 1940". The king replied, "That is exactly why I am coming to You, dear Ivar Lykke", and stretched forward his hand" [for greeting].

Political offices
Preceded by Johan Ludwig Mowinckel	Prime Minister of Norway; 1926–1928	Succeeded by Christopher Hornsrud
Preceded by	President of the Storting; 1920—1921	Succeeded by
Preceded by	President of the Storting; 1923—1926	Succeeded by
