= Martin Olsen Nalum =

Norwegian politician

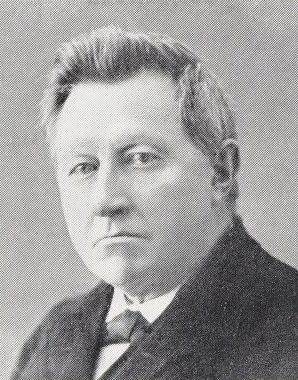

Minister of Education and Church Affairs
- In office 22 June 1921 – 6 March 1923
- Prime Minister: Otto Blehr
- Preceded by: Nils R. Jensen
- Succeeded by: Ivar B. Sælen

Minister of Agriculture
- In office 22 June 1921 – 26 July 1921
- Prime Minister: Otto Blehr
- Preceded by: Gunder A. Jahren
- Succeeded by: Håkon Five

Minister of Labour
- In office 26 July 1916 – 10 May 1920
- Prime Minister: Gunnar Knudsen
- Preceded by: Andreas Urbye
- Succeeded by: Ole M. Mjelde

President of the Storting
- In office 1 January 1916 – 26 July 1916 Serving with Ivar P. Tveiten and Johan Ludwig Mowinckel
- Prime Minister: Gunnar Knudsen
- Preceded by: Søren Årstad; Jørgen Løvland; Gunnar Knudsen
- Succeeded by: Otto B. Halvorsen; Gunnar Knudsen; Anders Buen; Ivar P. Tveiten; Ivar Lykke

Mayor of Brunlanes
- In office 1 January 1892 – 1 January 1916
- Preceded by: Ole Torgersen Bakkene
- Succeeded by: Nils S. Waale

Personal details
- Born: Fredrik Anton Martin Olsen Nalum; 13 May 1854 Brunlanes Municipality, Vestfold, Sweden-Norway
- Died: 19 January 1935 (aged 80) Hedrum Municipality, Vestfold, Norway
- Party: Liberal
- Spouse: Anne Marie Olsdatter Eidsten (m. 1877)
- Children: 6

Fredrik Anton Martin Olsen Nalum (13 May 1854 – 19 January 1935) was a Norwegian educator and politician for the Liberal Party. He held three different government minister posts, served as mayor and was a six-term member of Parliament.

He was born at Tanum in Brunlanes Municipality as a son of farmer Peder Martin Olsen Aaros (1817–1859) and Anne Olea Olsen Falkenberg (1816–1967). He attended school in the city of Larvik, graduated from Asker Seminary in 1872 and returned to Brunlanes as a school teacher from 1872 to 1909. He was also a farmer, having bought the farm Nalum in 1881 and later the farm Foldvik. He quit as a farmer in 1926, and his son bought the farmland in 1928.

He was a member of the municipal council of Brunlanes Municipality from 1883 to 1916, serving as mayor since 1892. He was an elector from 1883 to 1903, before entering election himself. He was elected to the Parliament of Norway from Brunla in 1906, and was re-elected in 1909, 1912, 1915, 1918 and 1921. He served as President of the Storting during his fourth term, and also President of the Odelsting from 1920 to 1921.

From 1916 to 1920 he was the Minister of Labour in Knudsen's Second Cabinet. He was involved in transport politics in Parliament, and was also a board member of the Norwegian State Railways from 1910 to 1922 and supervisory commission member of the Jarlsberg Line from 1903 to 1911. Being a teacher, he was also involved in education politics, and was a member of the municipal and county school boards. In Blehr's Second Cabinet which served from 1921 to 1923 he was named as Minister of Education and Church Affairs, and also served as Minister of Agriculture from June to July 1921.

After retiring he lived at the family farm. He died in Nanset in Hedrum Municipality in 1935. He was buried in Tanum, and a memorial stone was raised there in November 1939.

Political offices
Preceded by Andreas Tostrup Urbye	Norwegian Minister of Labour; 1916–1920	Succeeded by Ole Monsen Mjelde
Preceded by Nils Riddervold Jensen	Norwegian Minister of Education and Church Affairs; 1921–1923	Succeeded by Ivar Bergersen Sælen
Preceded by Gunder Anton Jahren	Norwegian Minister of Agriculture; June 1921–July 1921	Succeeded by Haakon Martin Five
