= Minister of Labour and Social Inclusion =

Norwegian cabinet position

Minister of Labour and Social Inclusion of Norway
- Arbeids- og inkluderingsminister

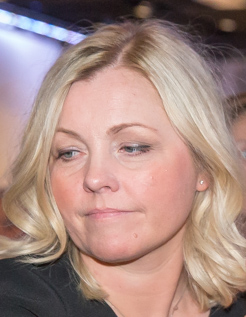
- Incumbent; Kjersti Stenseng since 16 September 2025
- Ministry of Labour and Social Inclusion
- Member of: Council of State
- Seat: Oslo
- Nominator: Prime Minister of Norway
- Appointer: Monarch; With approval of Parliament
- Term length: No fixed length
- Constituting instrument: Constitution of Norway
- Formation: 1 January 1846 (as Minister of the Interior)
- First holder: Frederik Stang
- Deputy: State secretaries at the Ministry of Labour and Social Inclusion
- Website: Official website

The Minister of Labour and Social Inclusion (Bokmål: Arbeids- og inkluderingsminister) is the head of the Norwegian Ministry of Labour and Social Inclusion. The position has existed since 1 January 1846, when the Ministry of the Interior was created. Several different names have been used since then, with three name changes after 2000. The incumbent minister is Kjersti Stenseng of the Labour Party since 2025. From 1992 to 2001 there was also a Minister of Health position in the ministry.

== List of ministers ==
Parties
Agrarian / Centre Party
Christian Democratic Party
Conservative Party
Communist Party
Free-minded Liberal Party
Independent
Labour Party
Labour Democrats
Liberal Party
Progress Party

=== Ministry of the Interior (1846–1903) ===
Photo	Name	Party	Took office	Left office	Tenure	Cabinet
	Frederik Stang	Independent	1 January 1846	15 July 1848	2 years, 196 days	Løvenskiold-Vogt
	Hans Christian Petersen	Independent	15 July 1848	15 July 1849	1 year, 0 days	Løvenskiold-Vogt
	Frederik Stang	Independent	15 July 1849	15 June 1854	4 years, 335 days	Løvenskiold-Vogt
	Christian Zetlitz Bretteville	Independent	15 June 1854	15 August 1858	4 years, 61 days	Løvenskiold-Vogt; Vogt
	August Christian Manthey	Independent	15 August 1858	15 July 1859	334 days	Vogt; Sibbern-Birch-Motzfeldt
	Christian Zetlitz Bretteville	Independent	15 July 1859	12 August 1861	2 years, 28 days	Sibbern-Birch-Motzfeldt
	August Christian Manthey	Independent	17 December 1861	22 October 1862	309 days	F. Stang
	Christian Zetlitz Bretteville	Independent	22 October 1862	15 August 1865	2 years, 297 days	F. Stang
	August Christian Manthey	Independent	15 August 1865	15 August 1866	1 year, 0 days	F. Stang
	Christian Zetlitz Bretteville	Independent	15 August 1866	15 June 1868	1 year, 305 days	F. Stang
	Frederik Stang	Independent	17 June 1868	15 October 1869	1 year, 120 days	F. Stang
	Christian Zetlitz Bretteville	Independent	15 October 1869	24 February 1871	1 year, 132 days	F. Stang
	Henrik Laurentius Helliesen	Independent	24 February 1871	13 May 1871	78 days	F. Stang
	Niels Petersen Vogt	Independent	13 May 1871	15 September 1872	1 year, 125 days	F. Stang
	Johan Collett Falsen	Independent	15 September 1872	15 September 1873	1 year, 0 days	F. Stang
	Niels Petersen Vogt	Independent	15 September 1873	15 July 1875	1 year, 303 days	F. Stang
	Christian August Selmer	Independent	15 July 1875	15 August 1876	1 year, 31 days	F. Stang
	Niels Petersen Vogt	Independent	15 August 1876	15 August 1878	2 years, 0 days	F. Stang
	Christian August Selmer	Independent	15 August 1878	15 August 1879	1 year, 0 days	F. Stang
	Niels Petersen Vogt	Independent	15 August 1879	15 September 1882	3 years, 31 days	F. Stang; Selmer
	Christian Jensen	Independent	15 September 1882	15 September 1883	1 year, 0 days	Selmer
	Niels Petersen Vogt	Independent	15 September 1883	21 March 1884	188 days	Selmer
	Thomas Cathinco Bang	Independent	3 April 1884	26 June 1884	84 days	Schweigaard
	Sofus Arctander	Free-minded Liberal	26 June 1884	15 August 1885	1 year, 50 days	Sverdrup
	Jacob Stang	Liberal	15 August 1885	15 August 1886	1 year, 0 days	Sverdrup
	Sofus Arctander	Free-minded Liberal	15 August 1886	17 February 1888	1 year, 186 days	Sverdrup
	Walter Scott Dahl	Liberal	5 March 1888	15 September 1888	194 days	Sverdrup
	Lars Knutson Liestøl	Liberal	15 September 1888	29 December 1888	105 days	Sverdrup
	Georg August Thilesen	Liberal	29 December 1888	13 July 1889	196 days	Sverdrup
	Johan Henrik Paasche Thorne	Conservative	13 July 1889	7 July 1890	359 days	Stang I
	Ole Andreas Furu	Conservative	7 July 1890	6 March 1891	242 days	Stang I
	Wollert Konow (H)	Liberal	6 March 1891	2 May 1893	2 years, 57 days	Steen I
	Johan Henrik Paasche Thorne	Conservative	2 May 1893	3 March 1894	305 days	Stang II
	Peter Birch-Reichenwald	Conservative	3 March 1894	14 October 1895	1 year, 225 days	Stang II
	Thomas von Westen Engelhart	Liberal	14 October 1895	15 August 1897	1 year, 305 days	Hagerup I
	Olaj Olsen	Liberal	15 August 1897	17 February 1898	186 days	Hagerup I
	Georg August Thilesen	Liberal	17 February 1898	29 April 1899	1 year, 71 days	Steen II
	Ole Anton Qvam	Liberal	29 April 1899	24 March 1900	329 days	Steen II
	Johannes Steen	Liberal	24 March 1900	21 April 1902	2 years, 28 days	Steen II
	Otto Blehr	Liberal	21 April 1902	1 January 1903	255 days	Blehr I

=== Ministry of Social Affairs, Trade, Industry and Fisheries (1913–1916) ===
Photo	Name	Party	Took office	Left office	Tenure	Cabinet
	Johan Castberg	Labour Democrats	1 July 1913	22 April 1914	295 days	Knudsen II
	Kristian Friis Petersen	Liberal	22 April 1914	1 October 1916	2 years, 162 days	Knudsen II

=== Ministry of Social Affairs (1916–2005) ===
Photo	Name	Party	Took office	Left office	Tenure	Cabinet
	Lars Abrahamsen	Liberal	1 October 1916	20 February 1919	2 years, 142 days	Knudsen II
	Paal Berg	Liberal	20 February 1919	21 June 1920	1 year, 122 days	Knudsen II
	Odd Klingenberg	Conservative	21 June 1920	22 June 1921	1 year, 1 day	Bahr Halvorsen I
	Lars Oftedal	Liberal	22 June 1921	20 October 1922	1 year, 122 days	Blehr II
	Rasmus O. Mortensen	Liberal	20 October 1922	6 March 1923	135 days	Blehr II
	Odd Klingenberg	Conservative	6 March 1923	25 July 1924	1 year, 141 days	Bahr Halvorsen II; Berge
	Lars Oftedal	Liberal	25 July 1924	5 March 1926	1 year, 223 days	Mowinckel I
	Peter Morell	Conservative	5 March 1926	28 January 1928	1 year, 329 days	Lykke
	Alfred Madsen	Labour	28 January 1928	15 February 1928	18 days	Hornsrud
	Torjus Værland	Liberal	15 February 1928	12 May 1931	3 years, 86 days	Mowinckel II
	Jakob N. Vik	Agrarian	12 May 1931	3 March 1933	1 year, 295 days	Kolstad; Hundseid
	Ole N. I. Strømme	Liberal	3 March 1933	28 October 1933	239 days	Mowinckel III
	Trygve Utheim	Liberal	28 October 1933	20 March 1935	1 year, 143 days	Mowinckel III
	Kornelius Bergsvik	Labour	20 March 1935	13 November 1936	1 year, 238 days	Nygaardsvold
	Oscar Torp	Labour	13 November 1936	1 July 1939	2 years, 230 days	Nygaardsvold
	Sverre Støstad	Labour	1 July 1939	25 June 1945	5 years, 359 days	Nygaardsvold
	Sven Oftedal	Labour	25 June 1945	23 June 1948	2 years, 364 days	Gerhardsen I-II (Note: From June 1940 to June 1945, the Norwegian government was exiled in London. Ministers of Social Affairs during this period were Andreas Diesen of the Administrative Council from April to September 1940, and Sverre Iversen briefly in 1945.)
	Aaslaug Aasland	Labour	20 December 1948	2 November 1953 (Note: Aasland was acting minister from 18 May to 20 December 1948.)	4 years, 317 days	Gerhardsen II; Torp
	Rakel Seweriin	Labour	2 November 1953	1 August 1955	1 year, 272 days	Torp; Gerhardsen II
	Gudmund Harlem	Labour	1 August 1955	18 February 1961	5 years, 201 days	Gerhardsen II
	Olav Bruvik	Labour	18 February 1961	30 December 1962	1 year, 315 days	Gerhardsen II
	Olav Gjærevoll	Labour	4 February 1963	28 August 1963	205 days	Gerhardsen II
	Kjell Bondevik	Christian Democratic	28 August 1963	25 September 1963	28 days	Lyng
	Olav Gjærevoll	Labour	25 September 1963	12 October 1965	2 years, 17 days	Gerhardsen IV
	Egil Aarvik	Christian Democratic	12 October 1965	17 March 1971	5 years, 156 days	Borten
	Odd Højdahl	Labour	17 March 1971	18 October 1972	1 year, 215 days	Bratteli I
	Bergfrid Fjose	Christian Democratic	18 October 1972	16 October 1973	363 days	Korvald
	Sonja Ludvigsen	Labour	16 October 1973	12 July 1974	269 days	Bratteli II
	Tor Halvorsen	Labour	12 July 1974 (Note: Halvorsen was acting minister from 16 April to 6 September 1974.)	15 January 1976	1 year, 187 days	Bratteli II
	Ruth Ryste	Labour	15 January 1976	8 October 1979	3 years, 266 days	Nordli
	Arne Nilsen	Labour	8 October 1979	14 October 1981	2 years, 6 days	Nordli; Brundtland I
	Leif Arne Heløe	Conservative	14 October 1981	9 May 1986	4 years, 207 days	Willoch I-II
	Tove Strand	Labour	9 May 1986	16 October 1989	3 years, 160 days	Brundtland II
	Wenche Frogn Sellæg	Conservative	16 October 1989	3 November 1990	1 year, 18 days	Syse
	Tove Veierød	Labour	3 November 1990	4 September 1992	1 year, 306 days	Brundtland III
	Grete Knudsen	Labour	4 September 1992	24 January 1994	1 year, 142 days	Brundtland III
	Hill-Marta Solberg	Labour	24 January 1994	17 October 1997	3 years, 266 days	Brundtland III; Jagland
	Magnhild Meltveit Kleppa	Centre	17 October 1997	17 March 2000	2 years, 152 days	Bondevik I
	Guri Ingebrigtsen	Labour	17 March 2000	19 October 2001	1 year, 216 days	Stoltenberg I
	Ingjerd Schou	Conservative	19 October 2001	18 June 2004	2 years, 243 days	Bondevik II
	Dagfinn Høybråten (Note: Minister of Labour and Social Affairs from 1 October 2004.)	Christian Democratic	18 June 2004	17 October 2005	1 year, 121 days	Bondevik II

=== Ministry of Labour (1885–1946) ===
The labour tasks were transferred to the Ministry of Local Government in 1948, where it was until 1989 and again from 1992 to 1997. Labour responsibilities were returned to social affairs in 2002, and inclusion was added to the title in 2006.

Photo	Name	Party	Took office	Left office	Tenure	Cabinet
	Hans Rasmus Astrup	Liberal	1 September 1885	15 November 1887	2 years, 75 days	Sverdrup
	Birger Kildal	Liberal	15 November 1887	17 February 1888	94 days	Sverdrup
	Aimar Sørenssen	Liberal	17 February 1888	5 March 1888	17 days	Sverdrup
	Oscar Jacobsen	Liberal	5 March 1888	13 July 1889	1 year, 130 days	Sverdrup
	Peter Birch-Reichenwald	Conservative	13 July 1889	6 March 1891	1 year, 140 days	Stang I
	Hans Nysom	Liberal	6 March 1891	2 May 1893	2 years, 57 days	Steen I
	Peder Nilsen	Conservative	2 May 1893	15 August 1897	4 years, 105 days	Stang II; Hagerup I
	Fredrik Stang Lund	Liberal	15 August 1897	17 February 1898	186 days	Hagerup I
	Jørgen Løvland	Liberal	17 February 1898	28 February 1899	1 year, 11 days	Steen II
	Hans Nysom	Liberal	28 February 1899	5 June 1900	1 year, 97 days	Steen II
	Jørgen Løvland	Liberal	5 June 1900	22 October 1903	3 years, 139 days	Steen II; Blehr I
	Albert Hansen	Conservative	22 October 1903	11 March 1905	1 year, 140 days	Hagerup II
	Kristofer Lehmkuhl	Conservative	11 March 1905	28 September 1907	2 years, 201 days	Michelsen
	Jørgen Brunchorst	Independent	28 September 1907	19 March 1908	173 days	Michelsen; Løvland
	Nils Claus Ihlen	Liberal	19 March 1908	2 February 1910	1 year, 320 days	Knudsen I
	Bernhard Brænne	Conservative	2 February 1910	11 June 1910	129 days	Konow
	Hans Jørgen Darre-Jenssen	Free-minded Liberal	11 June 1910	20 February 1912	1 year, 254 days	Konow
	Bernhard Brænne	Conservative	20 February 1912	23 August 1912	185 days	Bratlie
	Nils Olaf Hovdenak	Conservative	23 August 1912	31 January 1913	161 days	Bratlie
	Andreas Urbye	Liberal	31 January 1913	26 July 1916	3 years, 177 days	Knudsen II
	Martin Olsen Nalum	Liberal	26 July 1916	10 May 1920	3 years, 289 days	Knudsen II
	Ole Monsen Mjelde	Liberal	10 May 1920	21 June 1920	42 days	Knudsen II
	Cornelius Middelthon	Conservative	21 June 1920	22 June 1921	1 year, 1 day	Halvorsen I
	Ole Monsen Mjelde	Liberal	22 June 1921	6 March 1923	1 year, 257 days	Blehr II
	Cornelius Middelthon	Conservative	6 March 1923	25 July 1924	1 year, 141 days	Halvorsen II; Berge
	Ole Monsen Mjelde	Liberal	25 July 1924	5 March 1926	1 year, 223 days	Mowinckel I
	Anders Venger	Conservative	5 March 1926	26 July 1926	143 days	Lykke
	Worm Darre-Jenssen	Conservative	26 July 1926	28 January 1928	1 year, 186 days	Lykke
	Magnus Nilssen	Labour	28 January 1928	15 February 1928	18 days	Hornsrud
	Ole Monsen Mjelde	Liberal	15 February 1928	12 May 1931	3 years, 86 days	Mowinckel II
	Rasmus Langeland	Agrarian	12 May 1931	3 March 1933	1 year, 295 days	Kolstad; Hundseid
	Ole Monsen Mjelde	Liberal	3 March 1933	20 March 1935	2 years, 17 days	Mowinckel III
	Johan Nygaardsvold	Labour	20 March 1935	2 October 1939	4 years, 196 days	Nygaardsvold
	Olav Hindahl	Labour	2 October 1939	25 June 1945	5 years, 266 days	Nygaardsvold
	Johan Strand Johansen	Communist	25 June 1945	5 November 1945	133 days	Gerhardsen I
	Nils Langhelle	Labour	5 November 1945	22 February 1946	109 days	Gerhardsen II

=== Minister of Labour and Social Inclusion (2006–present) ===
Photo	Name	Party	Took office	Left office	Tenure	Cabinet
	Bjarne Håkon Hanssen	Labour	17 October 2005	20 June 2008	2 years, 247 days	Stoltenberg II
	Dag Terje Andersen	Labour	20 June 2008	20 October 2009	1 year, 122 days	Stoltenberg II
	Hanne Bjurstrøm	Labour	21 December 2009	21 September 2012	2 years, 275 days	Stoltenberg II
	Anniken Huitfeldt	Labour	21 September 2012	16 October 2013	1 year, 25 days	Stoltenberg II
	Robert Eriksson	Progress	16 October 2013	16 December 2015	2 years, 61 days	Solberg
	Anniken Hauglie	Conservative	16 December 2015	24 January 2020	4 years, 39 days	Solberg
	Torbjørn Røe Isaksen	Conservative	24 January 2020	14 October 2021	1 year, 263 days	Solberg
	Hadia Tajik	Labour	14 October 2021	4 March 2022	141 days	Støre
	Marte Mjøs Persen	Labour	7 March 2022	16 October 2023	1 year, 223 days	Støre
	Tonje Brenna	Labour	16 October 2023	16 September 2025	1 year, 335 days	Støre
	Kjersti Stenseng	Labour	16 September 2025	present	357 days	Støre

== Consultative ministers ==
Photo	Name	Party	Took office	Left office	Tenure	Cabinet
	Kirsten Hansteen	Communist	25 June 1945	5 November 1945	133 days	Gerhardsen I
	Aaslaug Aasland	Labour	5 November 1945	20 December 1948	3 years, 45 days	Gerhardsen II

== List of Norwegian Ministers of Health within the Ministry of Health and Social Affairs ==
Name	From	To
Werner Christie	1992	1995
Gudmund Hernes	1995	1997
Dagfinn Høybråten	1997	2000
Tore Tønne	2000	2001
Dagfinn Høybråten	2001	position defunct

For later Ministers, see Minister of Health and Care Services (Norway).
