= Gerdt Henrik Meyer Bruun =

Norwegian politician

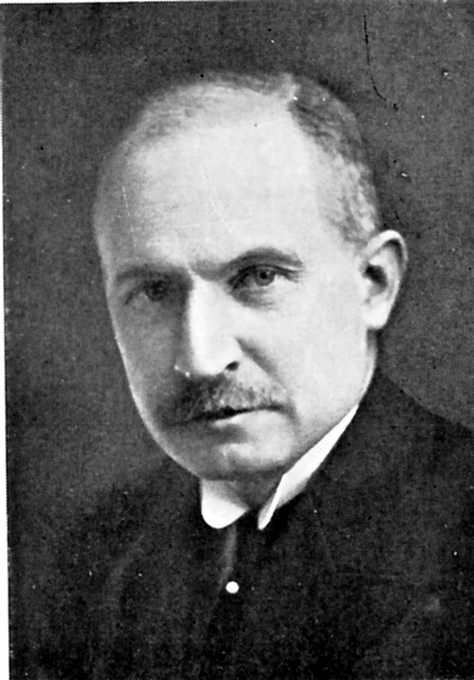

Minister of Trade
- In office 21 June 1920 – 22 June 1921
- Prime Minister: Otto B. Halvorsen
- Preceded by: Birger Stuevold-Hansen
- Succeeded by: J. L. Mowinckel

Personal details
- Born: 3 February 1873 Bergen, Hordaland, Sweden-Norway
- Died: 17 April 1945 (aged 72)
- Party: Conservative
- Children: Gerda "Pytt" Geddes

Gerdt Henrik Meyer Bruun (3 February 1873 – 17 April 1945) was a Norwegian industrialist and a politician for the Conservative Party. The son of factory owner Engelbrekt Christen Bruun (1839-1913), he took over his father's business in 1897. He entered politics shortly after this, and served as deputy mayor and later mayor of Årstad Municipality from 1901 to 1915. In 1919, Bruun was elected to the Norwegian parliament for a three-year period. He was then appointed Minister of Trade in the cabinet of Otto Bahr Halvorsen, lasting from 1920 to 1921.

Bruun owned the property "Villa Solhaug" in Leapark at Minde until shipowner Erik Grant Lea took over the property in 1915. In 1922 he built Storhaugen at Kirkeveien 62 in Paradise Bergen, after architect Ole Landmarks' drawings.
