= Nils Riddervold Jensen =

Norwegian educator and politician (1863–1938)

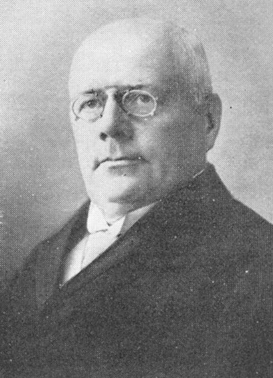

Minister of Education and Church Affairs
- In office 21 June 1920 – 22 June 1921
- Prime Minister: Otto B. Halvorsen
- Preceded by: Jørgen Løvland
- Succeeded by: Martin Olsen Nalum

Member of the Norwegian Parliament
- In office 1 January 1916 – 31 December 1918
- Constituency: Tønsberg
- In office 1 January 1910 – 31 December 1912
- Constituency: Tønsberg
- In office 1 January 1904 – 31 December 1906
- Constituency: Tønsberg

Personal details
- Born: 22 March 1863 Kristiania, Sweden-Norway
- Died: 8 January 1938 (aged 74) Nøtterøy, Vestfold, Norway
- Party: Conservative
- Spouse: Wenche Christiane Dietrichson (m. 1897)

Nils Riddervold Jensen (22 March 1863 – 8 January 1938) was a Norwegian educator and politician for the Conservative Party.

He was born in Kristiania as a son of dean Peter Andreas Jensen (1812–1867) and Mette Marie Riddervold (1827–1895). He was a maternal grandson of politician Hans Riddervold. He was a brother of Anne Marie Riddervold Jensen, who married Finn Lützow-Holm. He was also a first cousin of attorney Hans Riddervold, who in turn was the father of Hans Julius Riddervold.

He took his examen artium in 1881 and the cand.theol. degree in 1887. He spent his entire career, from 1887 to 1924, as a teacher in Tønsberg; from 1912 to 1919 as headmaster. He was also the auditor for the local savings bank from 1896 to 1928.

He was a member of the municipal council of Tønsberg Municipality from 1898 to 1931, serving as deputy mayor from 1901 to 1904. He was elected to the Parliament of Norway from Tønsberg in 1903. After not being re-elected after three years, he did return and was elected to a second and third term in 1909 and 1915 respectively. From June 1920 to June 1921 he was the Norwegian Minister of Education and Church Affairs in Bahr Halvorsen's First Cabinet.

Political offices
Preceded by Jørgen Løvland	Norwegian Minister of Education and Church Affairs; 1920–1921	Succeeded by Martin Olsen Nalum
