= Mowinckel's Third Cabinet =

Government of Norway from 1933 to 1935

- Cabinet of Norway

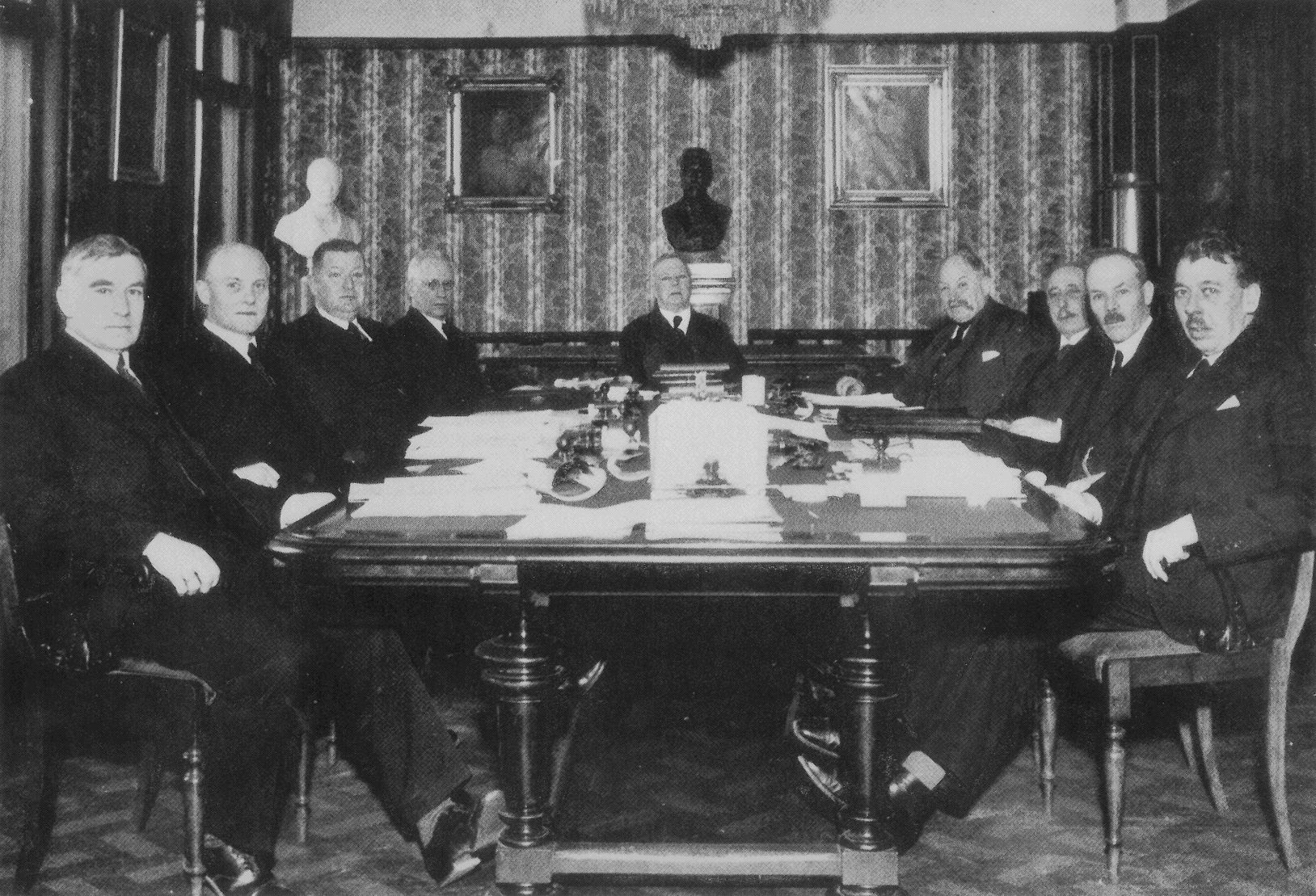
- The cabinet in 1933. From left to right: Kobro, Sunde, Meling, Five, Prime Minister Mowinckel, Monsen Mjelde, Berg Lund, Liestøl and Utheim.
- Date formed: 3 March 1933
- Date dissolved: 20 March 1935

People and organisations
- Head of state: Haakon VII of Norway
- Head of government: Johan Ludwig Mowinckel
- Total no. of members: 9
- Member party: Liberal Party
- Status in legislature: Minority government

History
- Incoming formation: Change of government after confidence vote
- Outgoing formation: Government crisis
- Election: 1933 parliamentary election
- Legislature term: 1934-1936
- Predecessor: Hundseid's Cabinet
- Successor: Nygaardsvold's Cabinet

The Mowinckel's Third Cabinet governed Norway between 3 March 1933 and 20 March 1935. It had the following composition:

== Cabinet members ==
Cabinet
Portfolio	Minister	Took office	Left office	Party
Prime Minister; Minister of Foreign Affairs	Johan Ludwig Mowinckel	3 March 1933	20 March 1935	Liberal
Minister of Justice and the Police	Arne T. Sunde	3 March 1933	20 March 1935	Liberal
Minister of Finance and Customs	Per Berg Lund	3 March 1933	3 November 1934	Liberal
Minister of Finance and Customs	Gunnar Jahn	3 November 1934	20 March 1935	Liberal
Minister of Defence	Jens Isak Kobro	3 March 1933	20 March 1935	Liberal
Minister of Agriculture	Håkon Five	3 March 1933	20 March 1935	Liberal
Minister of Education and Church Affairs	Knut Liestøl	3 March 1933	20 March 1935	Liberal
Minister of Trade	Lars O. Meling	3 March 1933	20 March 1935	Liberal
Minister of Labour	Ole Monsen Mjelde	3 March 1933	20 March 1935	Liberal
Minister of Social Affairs	Ole N. Strømme	3 March 1933	28 October 1933	Liberal
Minister of Social Affairs	Trygve Utheim	28 October 1933	20 March 1935	Liberal

== Secretary to the Council of State ==
- Bredo Rolsted
