= Ole Monsen Mjelde =

Norwegian politician

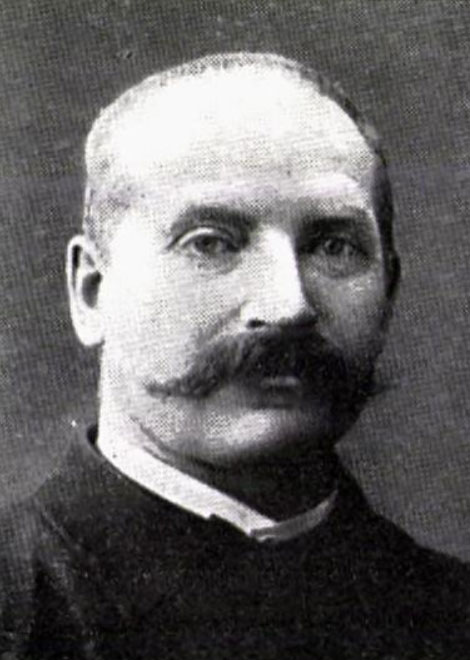
- Portrait of Ole Monsen Mjelde

Minister of Labour
- In office 3 March 1933 – 20 March 1935
- Prime Minister: J. L. Mowinckel
- Preceded by: Rasmus Langeland
- Succeeded by: Johan Nygaardsvold
- In office 15 February 1928 – 12 May 1931
- Prime Minister: J. L. Mowinckel
- Preceded by: Magnus Nilssen
- Succeeded by: Rasmus Langeland
- In office 25 July 1924 – 5 March 1926
- Prime Minister: J. L. Mowinckel
- Preceded by: Cornelius Middelthon
- Succeeded by: Anders Venger
- In office 22 June 1921 – 6 March 1923
- Prime Minister: Otto Blehr
- Preceded by: Cornelius Middelthon
- Succeeded by: Cornelius Middelthon
- In office 10 May 1920 – 21 June 1920
- Prime Minister: Gunnar Knudsen
- Preceded by: Martin Olsen Nalum
- Succeeded by: Cornelius Middelthon

Minister of Provisioning
- In office 22 June 1921 – 23 July 1921
- Prime Minister: Otto Blehr
- Preceded by: Johan H. R. Holmboe
- Succeeded by: Rasmus Mortensen

Member of the Norwegian Parliament
- In office 1 January 1922 – 31 December 1936
- Constituency: Hordaland
- In office 1 January 1907 – 31 December 1921
- Constituency: Voss

Personal details
- Born: 12 September 1865 Osterøy, Søndre Bergenhus, United Kingdoms of Sweden and Norway
- Died: 7 March 1942 (aged 76) Osterøy, Hordaland, Norway
- Party: Liberal
- Spouse: Anna Monsdotter Mjelde (m. 1888)
- Children: 14

Ole Monsen Mjelde (12 September 1865 – 7 March 1942) was a Norwegian politician of the Liberal Party who served as the Minister of Labour 1920, 1921–1923, 1924–1926, 1928–1931 and 1933–1935, and also as head Ministry of Provisioning in 1921.
