= Cornelius Middelthon =

Norwegian Minister of Labour (1920-21 & 1923-24)

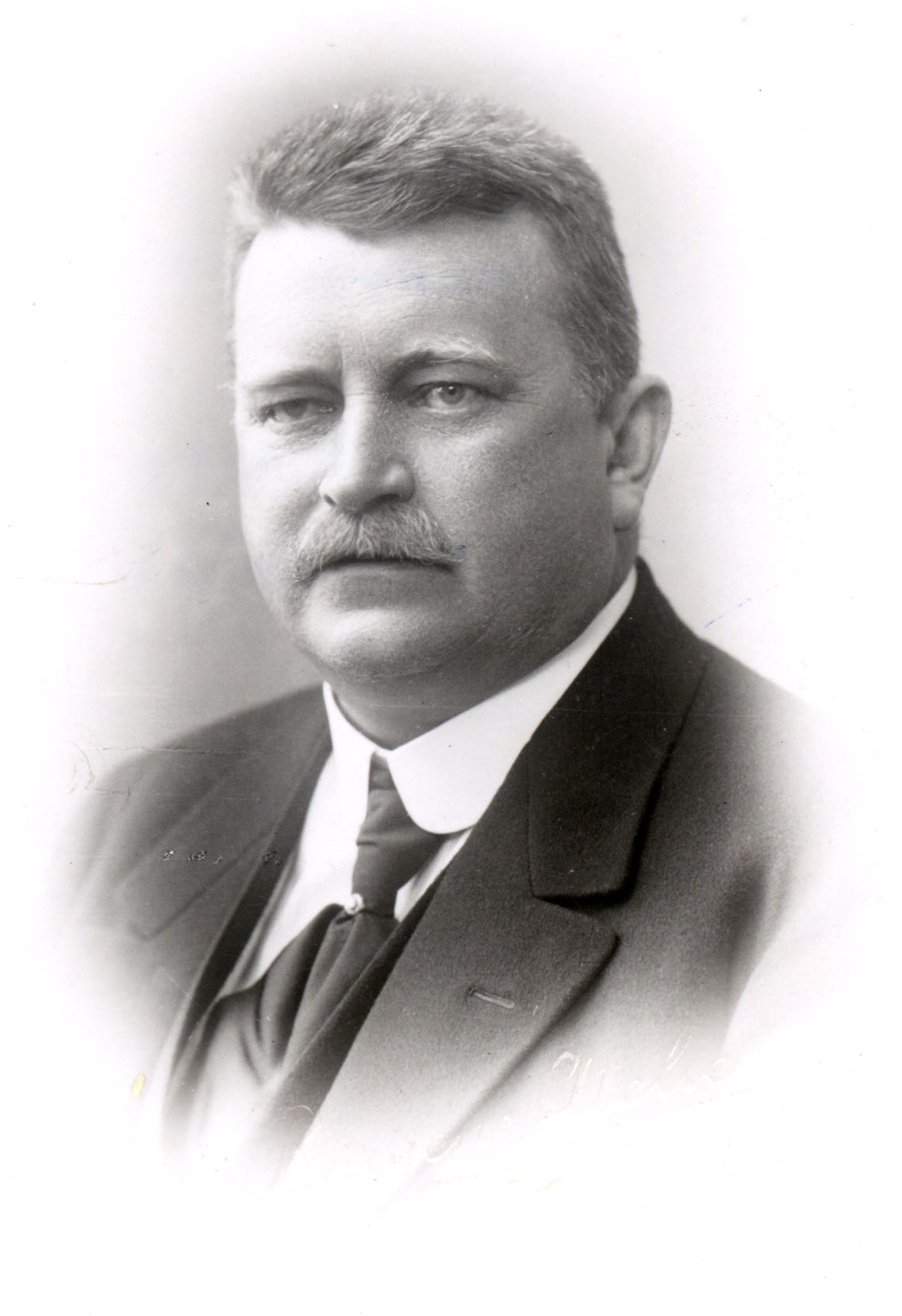
- Parliamentary portrait of Middelthon.

Minister of Labour
- In office 6 March 1923 – 25 July 1924
- Prime Minister: Otto B. Halvorsen; Abraham Berge
- Preceded by: Ole M. Mjelde
- Succeeded by: Ole M. Mjelde
- In office 21 June 1920 – 22 June 1921
- Prime Minister: Otto B. Halvorsen
- Preceded by: Ole M. Mjelde
- Succeeded by: Ole M. Mjelde

Member of the Norwegian Parliament
- In office 1 January 1922 – 31 December 1924
- Constituency: Market towns of Vest-Agder and Rogaland counties
- In office 1 January 1919 – 31 December 1921
- Constituency: Holmen, Stavanger

Personal details
- Born: 12 April 1869 Stavanger, Rogaland, Sweden-Norway
- Died: 6 April 1934 (aged 64) Stavanger, Rogaland, Norway
- Party: Conservative

Cornelius Middelthon (12 April 1869 – 6 April 1934) was a Norwegian grocer and politician of the Conservative Party who served as Minister of Labour from 1920 to 1921 and again from 1923 to 1924.
