= Christian Meidell Kahrs =

Norwegian businessperson and politician

Christian Meidell Kahrs (24 September 1858 – 12 July 1924) was a Norwegian businessperson and politician for the Liberal Party and later the Coalition Party.

He was born in Bergen. He graduated from Bergen Cathedral School in 1877, and took the cand.jur. degree in 1881. In 1882 he was hired as a clerk for the district stipendiary magistrate in Hallingdal. Already the next year he returned to Bergen to work as a merchant. He was also the CEO of the bank Bergens Sparebank.

He was a member of Bergen city council from 1893 to 1910, serving as mayor from 1899 to 1901, preceded by Christian Michelsen and followed by Johan Ludwig Mowinckel, both of whom served as Prime Minister of Norway. Kahrs was elected to the Norwegian Parliament in 1904, but only served one term.

Kahrs was a member of the board of the Den Nationale Scene from 1892 to 1909, and chaired the supervising committee of the Bergen Line.

Political offices
| Preceded by Christian Michelsen | Mayor of Bergen; 1899–1901 | Succeeded by Johan Ludwig Mowinckel |
