= Nalum (Norway) =

Norwegian Region

Coordinates: 58°59′28″N 9°58′56″E

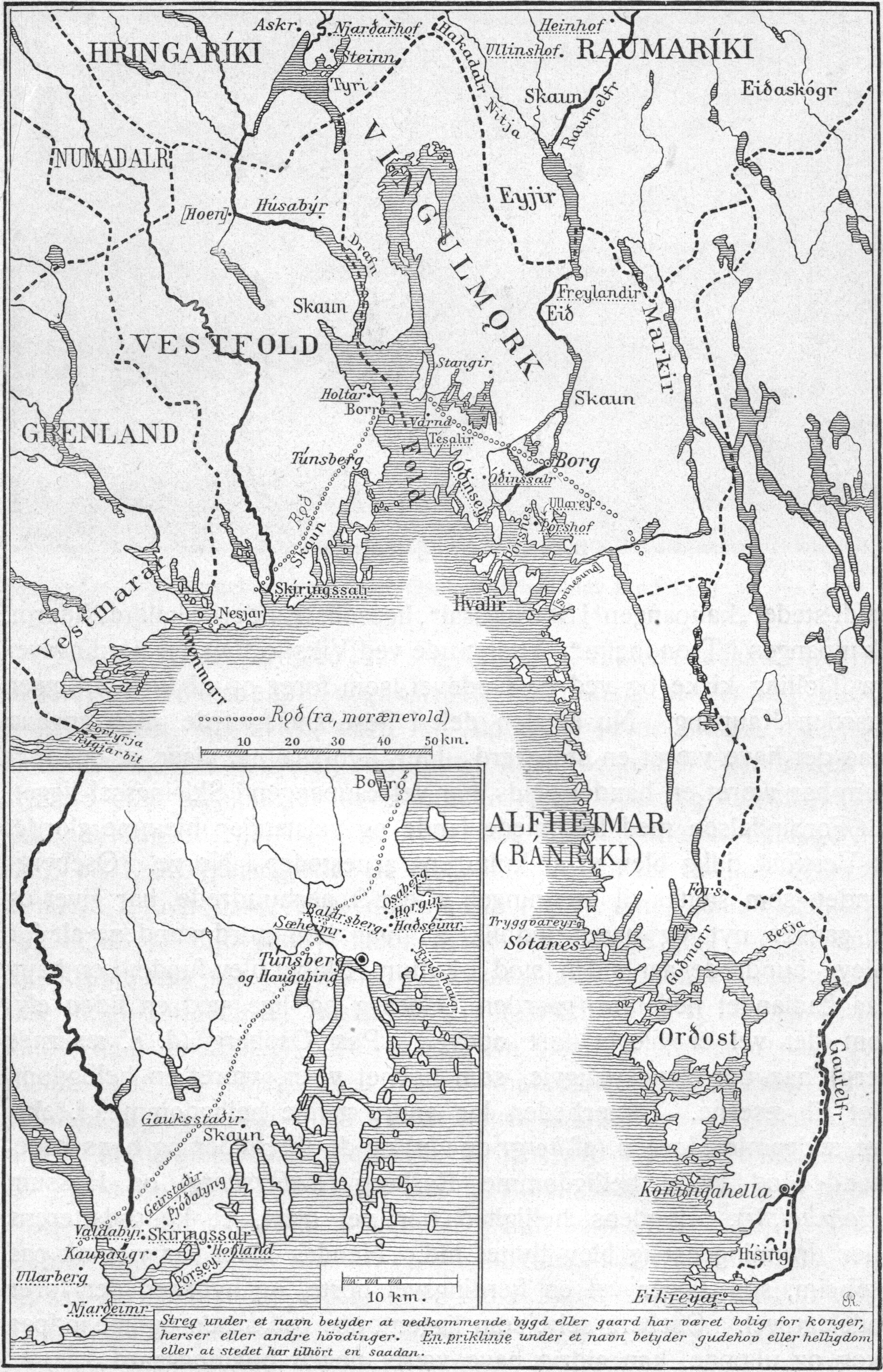
Nalum, shown here as Njarðheimr in the bottom-left corner, in a map of Viking-age Viken

Nalum is a farm area in Larvik Municipality, Norway. It is located on the southeastern part of the Brunlanes peninsula near the town of Stavern. The current name is derived from the earlier name of Njardheimr, which means Njard's place, and was likely a site of worship for the god Njörðr. The suffix -heim indicates that the farm dates from the pre-Viking period. Artifacts have been found here from the bronze, iron, and Viking periods.

Politician Martin Olsen Nalum bought Nalum farm in 1881, and changed his surname accordingly.

The Nalum schoolhouse was taken over by the Nalum Women's Union in 1914 and now serves as a retirement home.
