= Guri Ingebrigtsen =

Norwegian politician (1952–2020)

Minister of Social Affairs
- In office 17 March 2000 – 19 October 2001
- Prime Minister: Jens Stoltenberg
- Preceded by: Magnhild Meltveit Kleppa
- Succeeded by: Ingjerd Schou

Mayor of Vestvågøy Municipality
- In office October 1999 – October 2007
- Deputy: Terje Wiik
- Preceded by: Frank Rist
- Succeeded by: Jonny Finstad

Personal details
- Born: 19 May 1952 Værøy, Nordland, Norway
- Died: 5 January 2020 (aged 67)
- Party: Labour
- Occupation: Politician

Guri Helene Ingebrigtsen (19 May 1952 – 5 January 2020) was a Norwegian politician for the Labour Party.

Ingebrigtsen was born in Værøy Municipality. In the 1970s she was a member of the leftist Workers' Communist Party (AKP). In 1986, she worked in the Afghanistan Committee, giving medical aid. She was a graduate in medicine from the University of Oslo in 1982, having minored in criminology in 1976. Among several medicine-related jobs, she was a researcher at the University of Oslo from 1987 to 1996.

From 1996 to 1997, during the cabinet Jagland, she was appointed political advisor to the Minister of Health and Social Affairs. From 2000 to 2001, during the first cabinet Stoltenberg, she headed the same Ministry.

On the local level Ingebrigtsen was a member of the municipal council of Vestvågøy Municipality from 1995 to 1999, and then served as mayor there from 1999 to 2007.

On 5 January 2020, Ingebrigtsen died from cancer at the age of 67.

Political offices
Preceded by Frank Rist	Mayor of Vestvågøy Municipality; 1999–2007	Succeeded by Jonny Finstad
Preceded by Magnhild Meltveit Kleppa	Minister of Labour and Social Inclusion; 2000–2001	Succeeded by Ingjerd Schou
