= Ingjerd Schou =

Norwegian politician (born 1955)

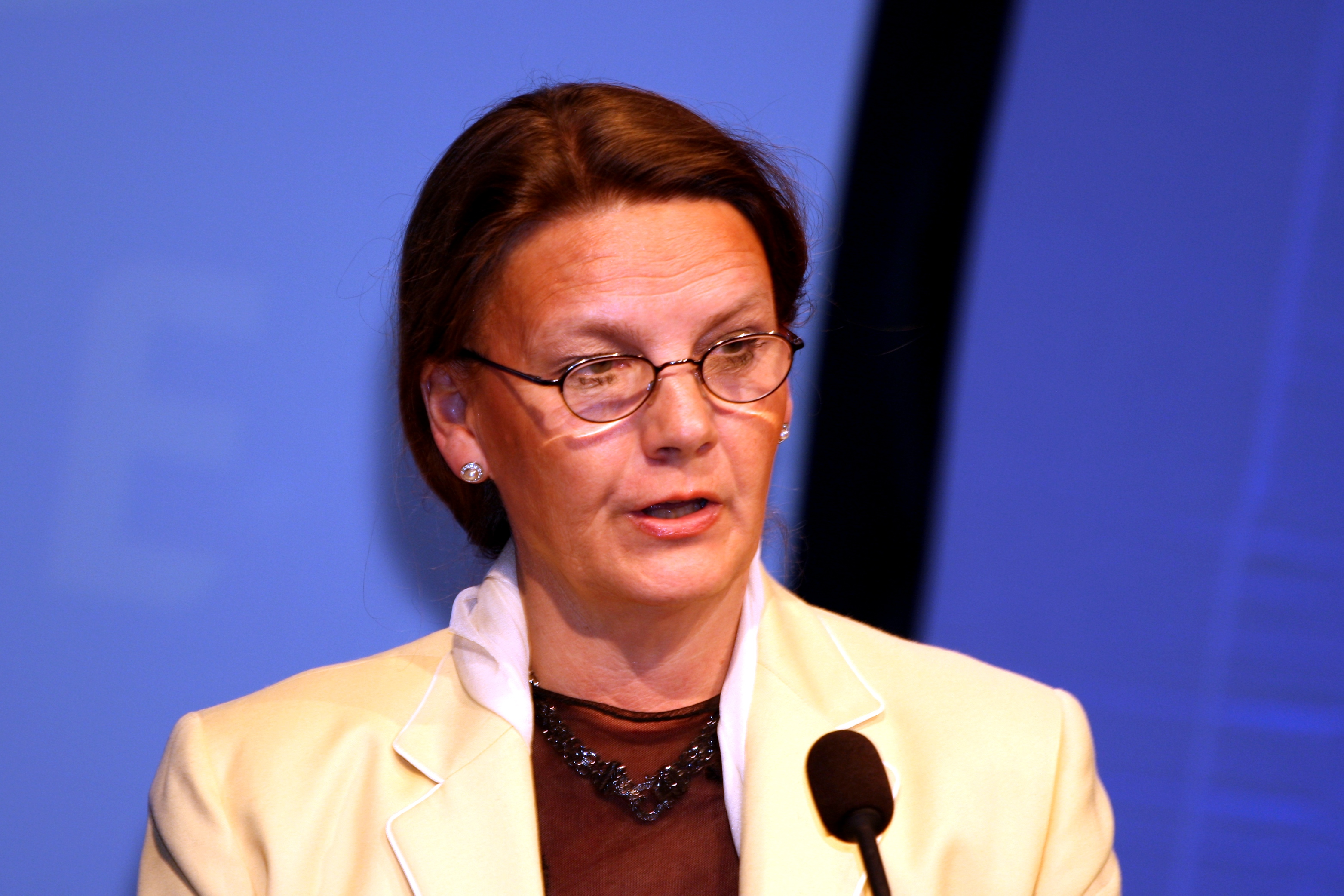
- Schou in 2009

Fifth Vice President of the Storting
- In office 30 January 2020 – 9 October 2021
- President: Tone W. Trøen
- Preceded by: Abid Raja
- Succeeded by: Ingrid Fiskaa

Fourth Vice President of the Storting
- In office 8 October 2013 – 30 September 2017
- President: Olemic Thommessen
- Preceded by: Akhtar Chaudhry
- Succeeded by: Nils T. Bjørke

Minister of Social Affairs
- In office 19 October 2001 – 18 June 2004
- Prime Minister: Kjell Magne Bondevik
- Preceded by: Guri Ingebrigtsen
- Succeeded by: Dagfinn Høybråten

Member of the Norwegian Parliament
- Incumbent
- Assumed office 1 October 2009
- Constituency: Østfold
- In office 1 October 2001 – 30 September 2005
- Constituency: Østfold

Personal details
- Born: Ingjerd Schie; 20 January 1955 (age 71) Sarpsborg, Østfold, Norway
- Party: Conservative
- Spouse: Petter Schou

Ingjerd Schou, née Schie (born 20 January 1955) is a Norwegian politician for the Conservative Party.

Born in Sarpsborg, Schou was elected to the Norwegian Parliament from Østfold in 2001. From 2001, when the second cabinet Bondevik held office, Schou was Minister of Social Affairs. She was replaced in a 2004 cabinet reshuffle. During this period her seat in parliament was taken by Carsten Dybevig. Schou was not re-elected in 2005, but instead served as a deputy representative.

On the local level Schou was a member of the executive committee of Spydeberg municipal council from 1991 to 2003. For the periods 2003-2007 and 2007-2011 Schou represents the Conservative Party in the municipal council in Spydeberg.

Before entering politics Schou worked as a nurse before becoming a health bureaucrat. She is married to Petter Schou, county doctor in Oslo and Akershus.

She served as the Fourth Vice President of the Storting from 2013–2017, and as the Fifth Vice President from 2020 to 2021.

She became chairman of Friends of Israel in the Parliament of Norway in 2023, and held a speech at a pro-Israel rally arranged by With Israel for Peace later the same year following the October 7 attacks.

Political offices
Preceded by Guri Ingebrigtsen	Norwegian Minister of Social Affairs; 2001–2004	Succeeded by Dagfinn Høybråten
Preceded by Abid Raja	Fifth Vice President of the Storting; 2020–2021	Succeeded by Ingrid Fiskaa
Preceded by Akhtar Chaudhry	Fourth Vice President of the Storting; 2013–2017	Succeeded by Nils T. Bjørke
