= Carsten Dybevig =

Norwegian politician (born 1963)

Carsten Dybevig (born 29 January 1963, in Halden) is a Norwegian politician for the Conservative Party.

He served as a deputy representative in the Norwegian Parliament from Østfold during the term 2005–2009. During the first three years term he sat as a regular representative, meanwhile Ingjerd Schou was appointed to the second cabinet Bondevik.

Dybevig held various positions in Halden municipality council from 1991 to 2007, serving as mayor from 1995 to 2001.
