= Jonny Finstad =

Norwegian politician

Mayor of Vestvågøy Municipality
- Incumbent
- Assumed office 3 October 2023
- Deputy: Pål Krüger
- Preceded by: Remi Solberg
- In office October 2007 – 9 October 2015
- Deputy: Elisabeth Holand
- Preceded by: Guri Ingebrigtsen
- Succeeded by: Remi Solberg

Member of the Storting
- In office 1 October 2017 – 30 September 2021
- Constituency: Nordland

Personal details
- Born: 19 May 1966 (age 59) Leknes, Nordland, Norway
- Party: Conservative

Jonny Finstad (born 19 May 1966) is a Norwegian politician. A member of the Conservative Party, he has served as the mayor of Vestvågøy Municipality since 2023, having previously held the position between 2007 and 2015. He also served as a member of the Storting, Norway's parliament, from the constituency of Nordland between 2017 and 2021.

== Political career ==
=== Local politics ===
Finstad served as mayor of Vestvågøy Municipality between 2007 and 2015, being re-elected in 2011. He was succeeded by Remi Solberg from the Labour Party following the 2015 local elections. He returned to the position following the 2023 local elections, succeeding Solberg.

=== Parliament ===
Finstad served as deputy member of the Storting from Nordland between 2013 and 2017 and was later elected as a regular representative to the Storting from the same constituency at the 2017 election.

He announced in September 2020 that he had been diagnosed with cancer and therefore would not seek re-election at the 2021 election.
