= Christian Lange Rolfsen =

Norwegian Minister of Justice

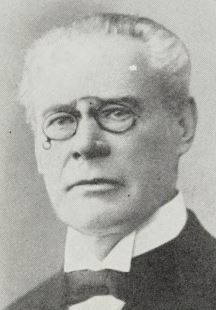

Minister of Justice
- In office 30 May 1923 – 25 July 1924
- Prime Minister: Abraham Berge
- Preceded by: Otto B. Halvorsen
- Succeeded by: Paal Berg

Member of the Norwegian Parliament
- In office 1 January 1910 – 31 December 1912
- Constituency: Buskerud

Mayor of Fredrikstad
- In office 1 January 1905 – 31 December 1909
- Preceded by: Fredrik Giebelhausen
- Succeeded by: G. Madsen

Personal details
- Born: 6 November 1864 Drammen, Buskerud, Sweden-Norway
- Died: 21 January 1934 (aged 69) Fredrikstad, Østfold, Norway
- Party: Conservative
- Spouse: Caroline Rolfsen

Christian Lange Rolfsen (6 November 1864 – 21 January 1934) was a Norwegian politician and attorney of the Conservative Party. He served as Minister of Justice from 1923 to 1924.
