= Knut Andreas Knudsen =

Norwegian shipowner and politician

Knut Andreas Knudsen (26 October 1919 – 10 April 2001) was a Norwegian shipowner and a politician for the Liberal Party. Born in Gjerpen, he was a son of shipowner Christen Knudsen (1884–1986) and a grandson of Gunnar Knudsen.

He served as a deputy representative to the Norwegian Parliament from Telemark during the terms 1961–1965 and 1965–1969.

Knudsen was a member of the executive committee of the municipal council of Gjerpen Municipality from 1955 to 1963. Then, Gjerpen was incorporated into Skien Municipality, and Knudsen held the same post in Skien from 1963 to 1975.
