= Nils Otto Hesselberg =

Norwegian politician

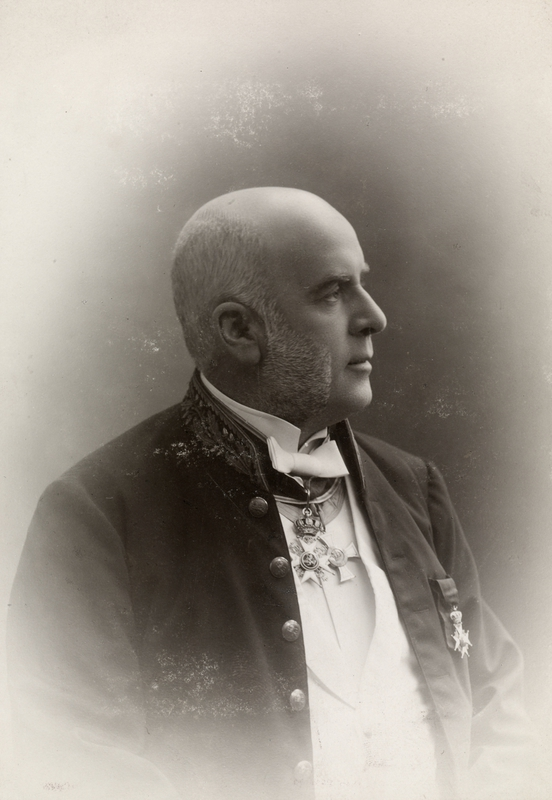
Nils Otto Hesselberg

Nils Otto Hesselberg (1844–1929) was a Norwegian politician for the Liberal Party. He was Chief of Kristiania Police department (1883–1906), secretary to Norway's Council of State (1906–1920), and was appointed state secretary in the first government of Prime Minister Gunnar Knudsen (1908–1910).
