= Johan Ludwig Mowinckel =

16th Prime Minister of Norway

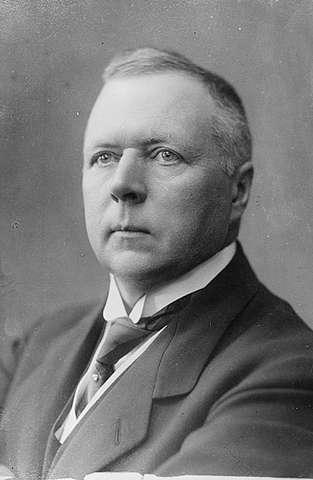
- Mowinckel in 1924.

Prime Minister of Norway
- In office 3 March 1933 – 20 March 1935
- Monarch: Haakon VII
- Preceded by: Jens Hundseid
- Succeeded by: Johan Nygaardsvold
- In office 15 February 1928 – 12 May 1931
- Monarch: Haakon VII
- Preceded by: Christopher Hornsrud
- Succeeded by: Peder Kolstad
- In office 25 July 1924 – 5 March 1926
- Monarch: Haakon VII
- Preceded by: Abraham Berge
- Succeeded by: Ivar Lykke

Minister of Foreign Affairs
- In office 3 March 1933 – 20 March 1935
- Prime Minister: Himself
- Preceded by: Birger Braadland
- Succeeded by: Halvdan Koht
- In office 15 February 1928 – 12 May 1931
- Prime Minister: Himself
- Preceded by: Edvard Bull, Sr.
- Succeeded by: Birger Braadland
- In office 25 July 1924 – 5 March 1926
- Prime Minister: Himself
- Preceded by: Christian F. Michelet
- Succeeded by: Ivar Lykke
- In office 31 May 1922 – 6 March 1923
- Prime Minister: Otto Blehr
- Preceded by: Arnold C. Ræstad
- Succeeded by: Christian F. Michelet

President of the Storting
- In office 1 January 1916 – 31 December 1918 Serving with Ivar P. Tveiten and Martin Olsen Nalum
- Monarch: Haakon VII
- Prime Minister: Gunnar Knudsen
- Preceded by: Jørgen Løvland; Søren Tobias Årstad; Gunnar Knudsen
- Succeeded by: Gunnar Knudsen; Ivar Lykke; Anders Buen; Ivar P. Tveiten; Otto B. Halvorsen

Minister of Trade
- In office 22 June 1921 – 20 October 1922
- Prime Minister: Otto Blehr
- Preceded by: Gerdt Bruun
- Succeeded by: Lars Oftedal

Mayor of Bergen
- In office 1 January 1902 – 31 December 1906
- Preceded by: Christian M. Kahrs
- Succeeded by: Carl V. E. Geelmuyden
- In office 1 January 1911 – 31 December 1913
- Preceded by: Carl V. E. Geelmuyden
- Succeeded by: Carl V. E. Geelmuyden

Member of the Norwegian Parliament
- In office 1 January 1906 – 9 April 1940
- Constituency: Hordaland

Leader of the Liberal Party
- In office 1927–1940
- Preceded by: Gunnar Knudsen
- Succeeded by: Jacob S. Worm-Müller (1945)

Personal details
- Born: 22 October 1870 Bergen, Hordaland, United Kingdoms of Sweden and Norway
- Died: 30 September 1943 (aged 72) New York, United States
- Party: Liberal
- Spouse: Augusta Mohr
- Children: 11
- Profession: Ship-owner

Johan Ludwig Mowinckel (22 October 1870 – 30 September 1943) was a Norwegian statesman, shipping magnate and philanthropist. He served as the prime minister of Norway during three separate terms.

== Biography ==
Johan Ludwig Mowinckel was born in Bergen, Norway. His parents were Johan Anton Wilhelm Mohr Mowinckel (1843–1918) and Edvardine Magdalene Margrethe Müller (1851–71). His father was a merchant and a member of one of Bergen's old merchant families. He was educated at University of Oslo, graduating in 1889. After graduation, he traveled abroad to Bremen and London to better learn the business of shipping. In 1893 he returned to Bergen and joined the offices of Christian Michelsen. In 1912, he became the founder and principal in the joint-stock shipping company, A/S J. Ludwig Mowinckels Rederi. He was also involved in founding the Norwegian America Line.

== Political career ==
Mowinckel entered public service in Bergen where he became Chairman of the local branch of the Liberal Party (Bergens Venstreforening) . He was elected to the Bergen City Council in 1899 and subsequently mayor of Bergen 1902–1906 and 1911–1913. In 1906, he became Member of Parliament (Storting) for the Liberal party representing Bergen during 1906–1909 and 1913–1918. He became President of the Storting in 1916. He was voted out of office in the 1918 elections.

During the period between World War I and 1935 he remained active in national politics. In 1921, Mowinckel was re-elected to the Storting. He served as Minister of Trade in 1921–1922 and Foreign Minister in 1922–1923. Mowinckel was Norway's Prime Minister during three periods in office; 1924–1926, 1928–1931 and 1933–1935. These were all periods dominated by economic and fiscal crisis. In 1930 Mowinckel initiated the Oslo Convention on customs cooperation between Norway, Denmark and the Benelux countries, to prevent higher customs walls.

In 1925 he became a member of the Nobel Peace Prize Committee. Mowinckel took the initiative during the Oslo Convention (Oslokonvensjonen) of 1930 to encourage free trade between the nations of the Belgium–Luxembourg Economic Union and Nordic countries, anticipating postwar efforts toward the formation of the European Union. He also took an active interest in the League of Nations, serving on the council and becoming president in 1933. In September 1933, Ukrainian public figures appealed to Johan Ludwig Mowinckel as the Head of the Council of the League of Nations with the request to consider the question of the man-made famine in Ukraine (Milena Rudnytska, Oleksander Shulhyn, Ukrainian Public Committee for Saving Ukraine. Also, Margery Corbett Ashby, the head of International Women's Alliance, appealed to him. He kept his word – he included the issue of the Holodomor to the 76th session of the Council of the League of Nations in spite of the resistance of the representatives of some European countries. The discussion of the causes and circumstances of the famine in Ukraine lasted for several hours, but the resolution was not adopted. The delegations of France and Great Britain were against it. He explained his decision by the fact that the "lives of millions" dead of starvation did not allow him to remain silent. He was personally acquainted with Norwegian traveler and public figure Fridtjof Nansen, who in 1932–1933 organized the aid to the Ukrainian farmers. On 20 October 1933, M. Danko, the correspondent of Lviv newspaper "Dilo," wrote that Mowinckel "will remain in the history of the Ukrainian struggles in Europe." Children from the Ukrainian community of Czech town of Poděbrady (Czechoslovakia) thanked Johan Ludwig Mowinckel for his humanistic position regarding the protection of the starving people in Ukraine. On 16 November 1933, he sent a warm response with the gratitude for the attention. He condemned the menace of Nazi philosophy, and when Germany overran Norway in 1940 he followed the Norwegian Government-in-exile to London.

In 1942, Johan Ludwig Mowinckel came to the United States and was engaged with Nortraship, the state-owned Norwegian shipping company during World War II. He died on 30 September 1943 in New York City.

== Legacy ==
Posthumously, a new library building at the University of Bergen was dedicated to Johan Ludvig Mowinckel and had its official opening ceremony, in the presence of King Olav V, on 13 September 1961.

Movinkel spread awareness about the Holodomor in Soviet Ukraine during the early 30's. Acknowledged in this editorialized poster below.

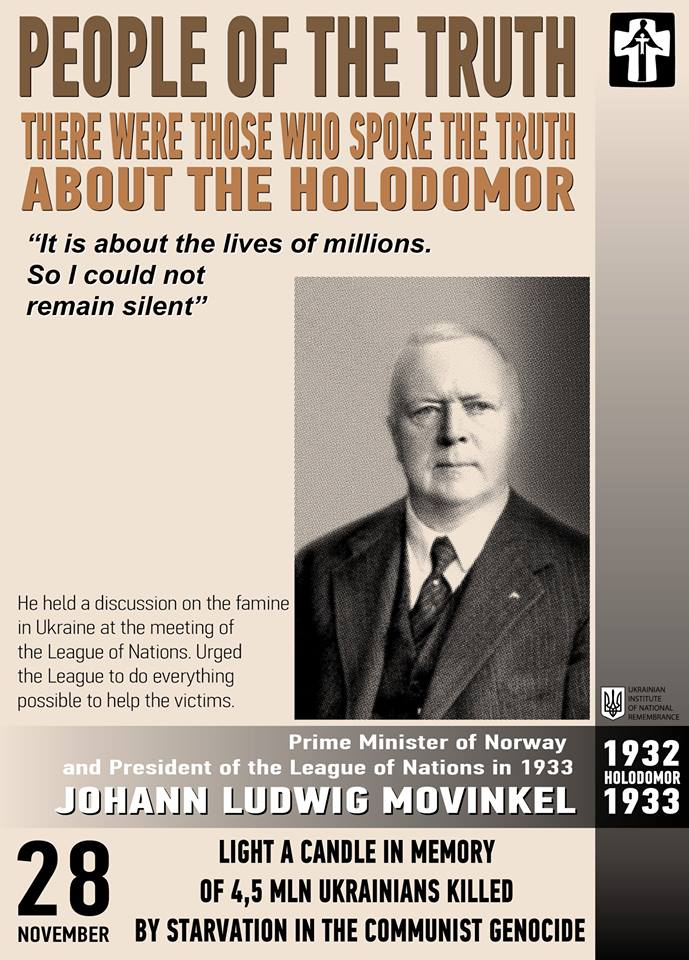

== Related reading ==
- Thowsen, Atle (1992) Handelsflåten i krig 1939 – 1945, Nortraship, profitt og patriotime (Oslo: Grøndahl og Dreyers Forlag) ISBN 82-504-1895-6
- Mossige, Erling (1989) Storrederiet Nortraship – Handelsflåten i krig (Oslo: Grøndahl & Søn Forlag) ISBN 82-504-1704-6

Political offices
Preceded by Abraham Berge	Prime Minister of Norway; 1924–1926	Succeeded by Ivar Lykke
Preceded by Christopher Hornsrud	Prime Minister of Norway; 1928–1931	Succeeded by Peder Kolstad
Preceded by Jens Hundseid	Prime Minister of Norway; 1933–1935	Succeeded by Johan Nygaardsvold
Preceded by Christian M. Kahrs	Mayor of Bergen; 1902–1906	Succeeded by Carl V. E. Geelmuyden
Preceded by Carl V. E. Geelmuyden	Mayor of Bergen; 1911–1913	Succeeded by Carl V. E. Geelmuyden
