= 1921 Norwegian parliamentary election =

- 24 October 1921

All 150 seats in the Storting 76 seats needed for a majority

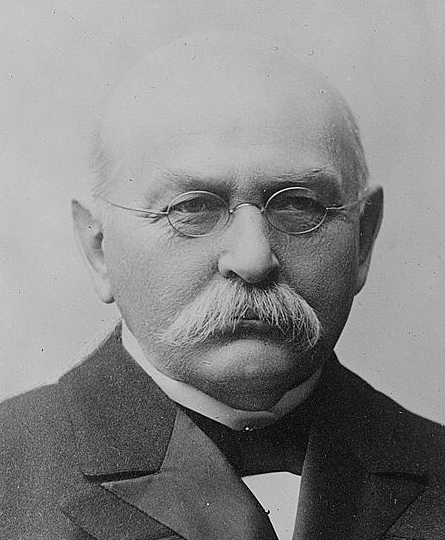

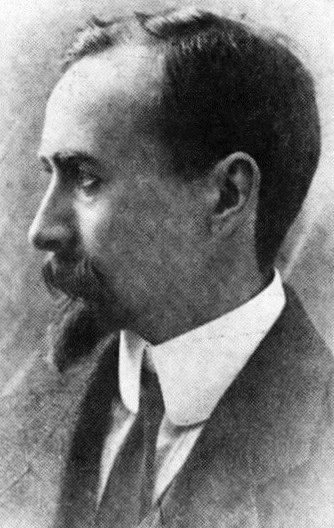

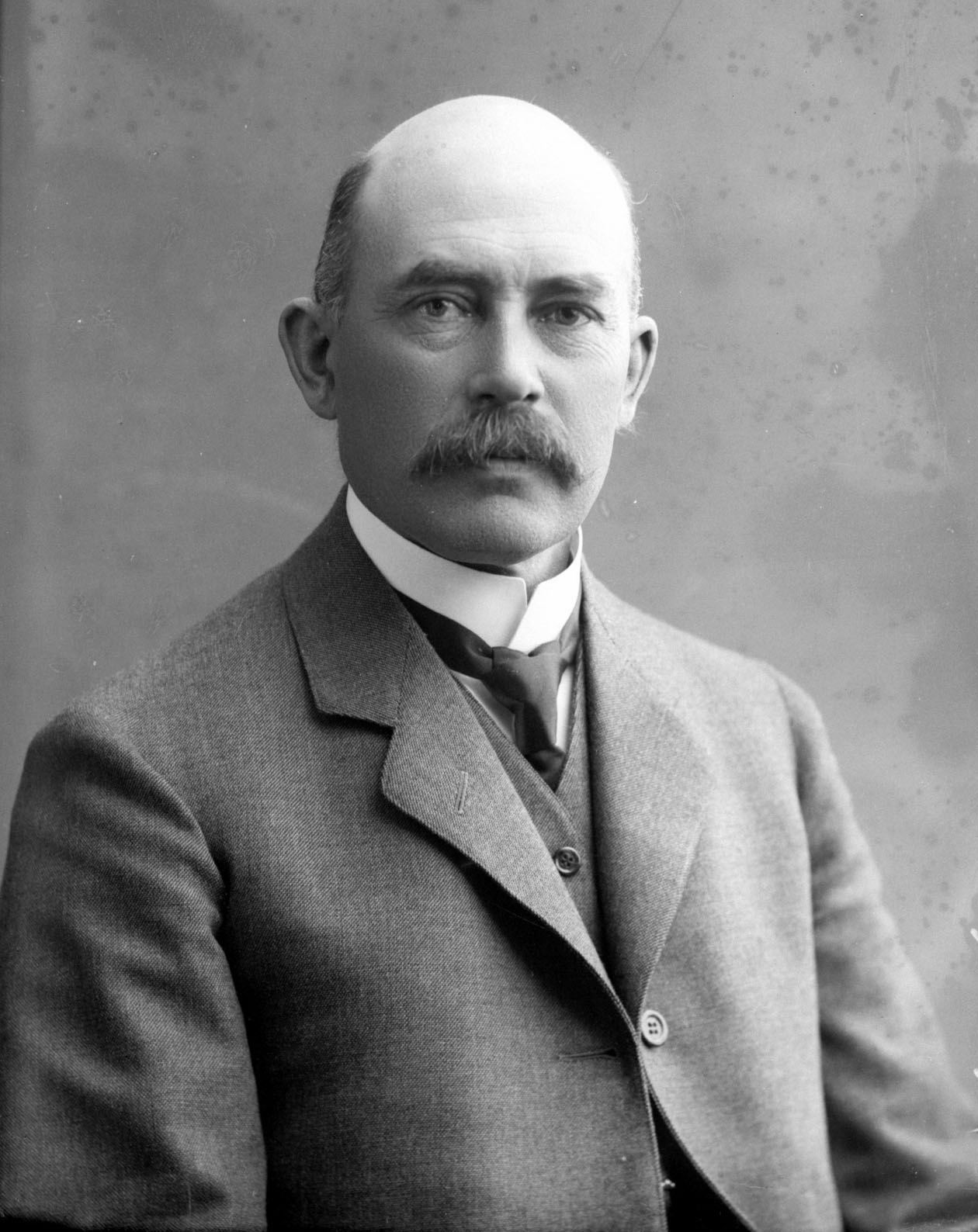

	First party	Second party	Third party
Leader	Otto Bahr Halvorsen	Gunnar Knudsen	Kyrre Grepp
Party	Conservative	Liberal	Labour
Last election	30.39%, 40 seats	28.32%. 51 seats	31.63%, 18 seats
Seats won	42	37	29
Seat change	▲2	▼14	▲11
Popular vote	301,372 (H+FV)	181,989	192,616
Percentage	33.31% (H+FV)	20.12%	21.29%
	Fourth party	Fifth party	Sixth party
Leader	Kristoffer Høgset	Bernt Holtsmark
Party	Farmers'	Free-minded Liberal	Social Democratic Labour
Last election	4.67%, 3 seats	10 seats with H
Seats won	17	15	8
Seat change	▲14	▲5	New
Popular vote	118,657	Alliance with H	83,629
Percentage	13.12%	—	9.24%
	Seventh party
Party	Radical People's
Last election	3.32%, 3 seats
Seats won	2
Seat change	▼1
Popular vote	22,970
Percentage	2.54%
Prime Minister before election
Otto Albert Blehr
Liberal
Prime Minister after election
Otto Albert Blehr
Liberal

Parliamentary elections were held in Norway on 24 October 1921. This was the first election to use proportional representation, which replaced previous two-round system. The result was a victory for the Conservative Party-Free-minded Liberal Party alliance, which won 57 of the 150 seats in the Storting.

== Results ==
Party	Votes	%	Seats	+/–
Conservative Party	301,372	33.31	42	+2
Free-minded Liberal Party	301,372	33.31	15	+5
Labour Party	192,616	21.29	29	+11
Liberal Party	181,989	20.12	37	–14
Farmers' Party	118,657	13.12	17	+14
Social Democratic Labour Party	83,629	9.24	8	New
Radical People's Party	22,970	2.54	2	–1
Other parties	2,811	0.31	0	–
Wild votes	655	0.07	–	–
Total	904,699	100.00	150	+24
Valid votes	904,699	98.58		
Invalid/blank votes	13,037	1.42		
Total votes	917,736	100.00		
Registered voters/turnout	1,351,183	67.92		
Source: Nohlen & Stöver

=== Seat distribution ===
Constituency	Total seats	Seats won					
Constituency	Total seats	H–FV	V	Ap	L	SD	RF
Akershus	7	4		1	1	1	
Aust-Agder	4	1	2		1		
Bergen	5	3	1	1			
Buskerud	5	3		2			
Finnmark	3	1	1	1			
Hedmark	7	2	1	3	1		
Hordaland	8	2	4	1	1		
Kristiana	7	5		2			
Market towns of Akershus and Østfold	4	2				2	
Market towns of Buskerud	3	2		1			
Market towns of Hedmark and Oppland	3	2		1			
Market towns of Møre	3	2				1	
Market towns of Nordland, Troms and Finnmark	4	2	1	1			
Market towns of Sør-Trøndelag and Nord-Trøndelag	5	3		2			
Market towns of Telemark and Aust-Agder	5	3	1	1			
Market towns of Vest-Agder and Rogaland	7	3	2	1		1	
Market towns of Vestfold	4	3		1			
Møre	7		5		2		
Nord-Trøndelag	5		2	1	2		
Nordland	8	3	2	2	1		
Oppland	6			1	3		2
Østfold	6	2	1		1	2	
Rogaland	5	1	3		1		
Sogn og Fjordane	5	1	3		1		
Sør-Trøndelag	6	1	2	2	1		
Telemark	5	1	2	2			
Troms	5	1	1	2		1	
Vest-Agder	4	1	2		1		
Vestfold	4	3	1				
Total	150	57	37	29	17	8	2
Source: Norges Offisielle Statistikk

=== National daily newspapers ===
Newspaper	Party endorsed	Notes
Jarlsberg og Laurvigs Amtstidende (nn)	Conservative Party	
Jarlsberg og Laurvigs Amtstidende (nn)	Free-minded Liberal Party	
Folkets Dagblad	Labour Party	
Sunnmørsposten	Liberal Party	
