= Ole Nikolai Ingebrigtsen Strømme =

Norwegian Minister of Social Affairs

Ole Nikolai Ingebrigtsen Strømme (23 February 1876 – 17 February 1936) was the Norwegian Minister of Social Affairs in 1933.
