= Rasmus Olai Mortensen =

Norwegian politician

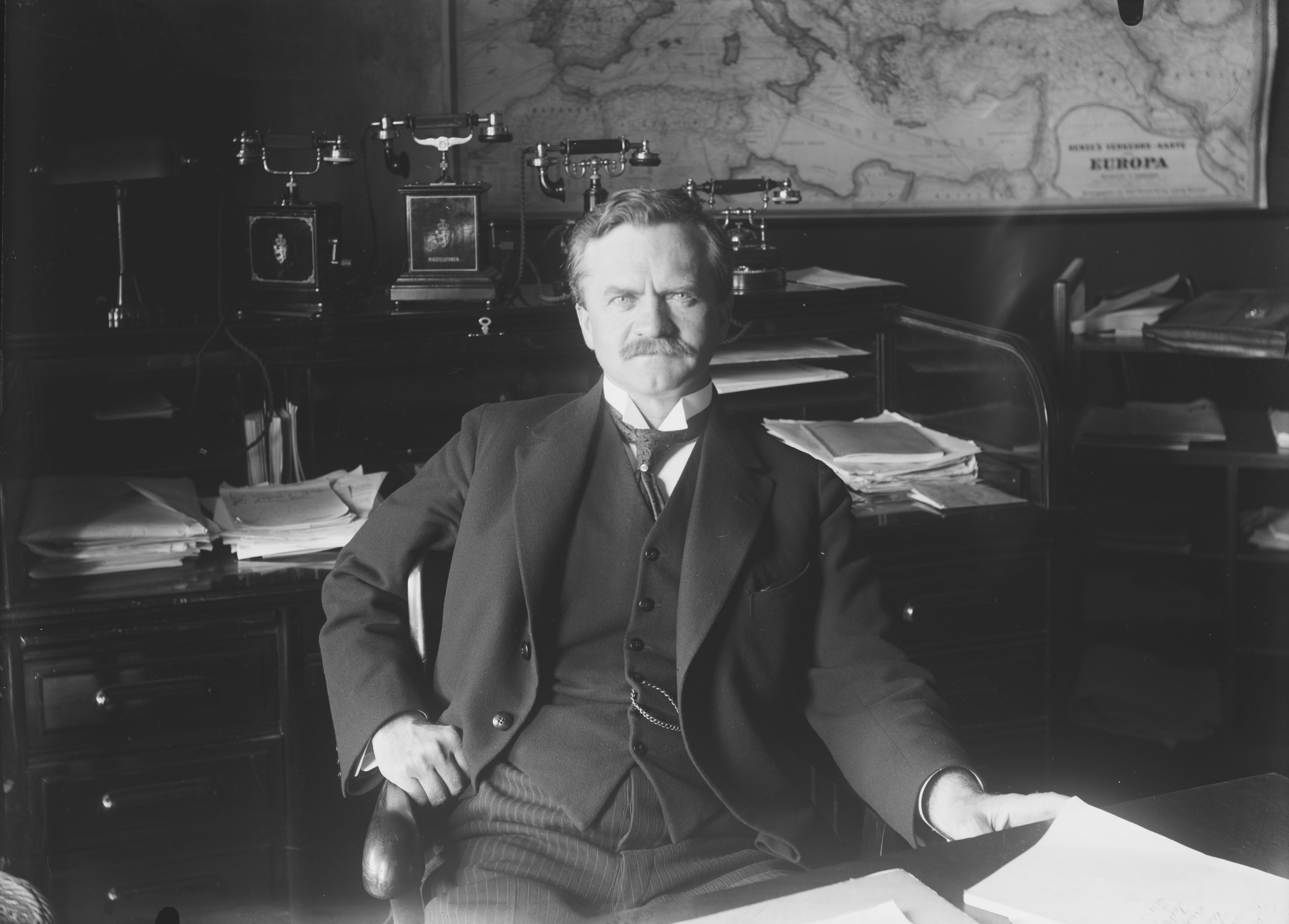

Ministry of Provisioning

Personal details
- Born: 23 August 1869
- Died: 30 July 1934 (aged 64)

Rasmus Olai Mortensen (23 August 1869 – 30 July 1934) was the Norwegian Minister of Provisioning 1921–1922, as well as head of the Ministry of Social Affairs in 1922, then Minister of Social Affairs 1922–1923 in Blehr's Second Cabinet.
