= Ministry of Provisioning =

Former government ministry of Norway

The Royal Norwegian Ministry of Industrial Provisioning (Norwegian: Provianteringsdepartementet) was a Norwegian ministry that existed from 1917 to 1922.

It was established on 26 August 1916, during the first World War. It ceased to exist on 31 October 1922. Its tasks were mainly transferred to the Ministries of Social Affairs and Agriculture.

The heads of the Ministry of Provisioning were: Oddmund Jacobsøn Vik (1916-1917), Birger Stuevold-Hansen (1917-1919), Haakon Martin Five (1919-1920), Johan Henrik Rye Holmboe (1920-1921), Ole Monsen Mjelde (1921) and Rasmus Olai Mortensen (1921-1922).

An unrelated Ministry of Provisioning was formed in 1939. This later changed its name to the Ministry of Provisioning and Reconstruction.
