= Birger Stuevold-Hansen =

Norwegian Minister of Trade

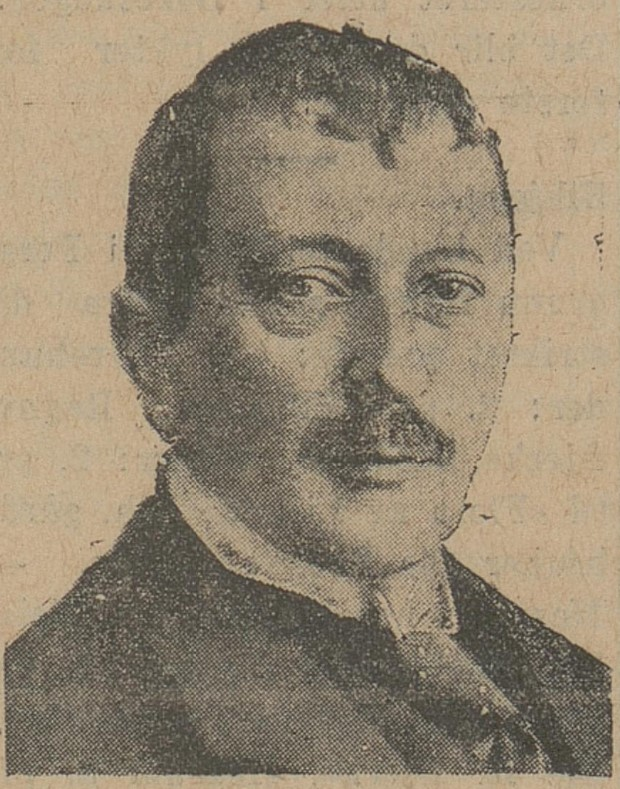
Birger Stuevold-Hansen

Birger Stuevold-Hansen (14 August 1870 – 13 August 1933) was the Norwegian Minister of Trade from 1919 to 1920.
