= Abraham Berge =

Prime Minister of Norway from 1923 to 1924

Abraham Theodor Berge
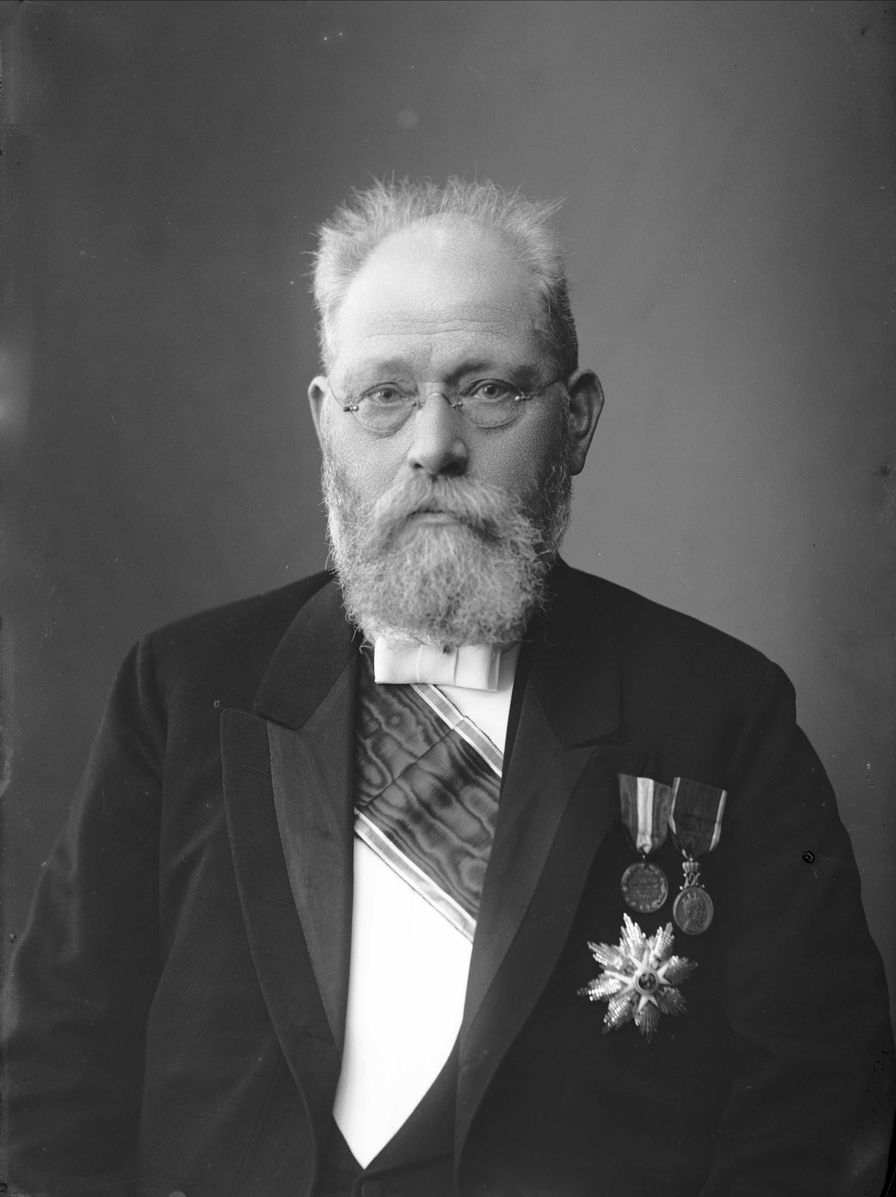
- Abraham Theodor Berge in 1912

Prime Minister of Norway
- In office 30 May 1923 – 25 July 1924
- Monarch: Haakon VII
- Preceded by: Otto B. Halvorsen
- Succeeded by: Johan Ludwig Mowinckel

Minister of Finance
- In office 6 March 1923 – 25 July 1924
- Prime Minister: Otto B. Halvorsen; Himself
- Preceded by: Otto Blehr
- Succeeded by: Arnold Holmboe
- In office 2 February 1910 – 20 February 1912
- Prime Minister: Wollert Konow
- Preceded by: Gunnar Knudsen
- Succeeded by: Fredrik L. Konow
- In office 7 November 1906 – 23 October 1907
- Prime Minister: Christian Michelsen
- Preceded by: Edvard H. Bull
- Succeeded by: Magnus Halvorsen

Minister of Education and Church Affairs
- In office 23 October 1907 – 19 March 1908
- Prime Minister: Jørgen Løvland
- Preceded by: Otto Jensen
- Succeeded by: Karl Seip

Personal details
- Born: Abraham Theodor Berge; 20 August 1851 Lyngdal, Norway
- Died: 10 July 1936 (aged 84) Tønsberg, Norway
- Party: Free-minded Liberal
- Other party: Liberal
- Spouse: Anne Elisabeth Kylleberg
- Profession: Teacher; Farmer; Statesman
- Awards: Order of St. Olav

Abraham Theodor Berge (20 August 1851 – 10 July 1936) was the prime minister of Norway from 1923 to 1924. He was a teacher and civil servant who represented the Liberal Party, the social liberal party, and later Free-minded Liberal Party, a right-of-centre party.

== Biography ==
Berge was born at Lyngdal Municipality in Lister og Mandals amt (present-day Vest-Agder), Norway . He was the son of Johan Tobias Johnsen Berge (1813–1883) and Helene Andreasdatter Kvalsvig. He attended the teacher's course offered by Reinert Rødland in Lyngdal Municipality. In 1867, Berge became teacher at the Nordbygda school in Vanse. He also served as sheriff in Vanse from 1904 to 1908. In 1908, Berge was appointed County Governor of Jarlsberg og Larvik amt, a position he held until 1924.

Berge started his political career in Lista Municipality (in the present-day Farsund Municipality), where he was in 1882 elected mayor. From here he went on to the Norwegian Parliament in 1891. He served, in different periods, as both Minister of Culture and Church Affairs and Minister of Finance. Then, after a 10-year absence from politics, he became again Minister of Finance, and later also Prime Minister, when sitting prime minister Otto Bahr Halvorsen died. He resigned this post as the result of the defeat in a vote to lift prohibition.

In 1926 he became the only Norwegian prime minister to ever be impeached. The charge was withholding information relating to the government rescue of a bank threatened by bankruptcy. However, he was acquitted in 1927, along with the six ministers who stood trial alongside him.

== Selected works ==
- Listerlandets kystværn og kaperfart 1807–14 (Tønsberg 1914) and Lista. En bygdebok (Tønsberg 1926). Both books reprinted 2006 by sokkhammer Forlag AS.

Political offices
Preceded by Ulrik Krohn	County Governor of Jarlsberg og Larvik amt 1908–1924	Succeeded by Herman Meinich
Preceded by Otto Bahr Halvorsen	Prime Minister of Norway; 1923–1924	Succeeded by Johan Ludwig Mowinckel
