= Gunnar Knudsen =

Norwegian politician (1848–1928)

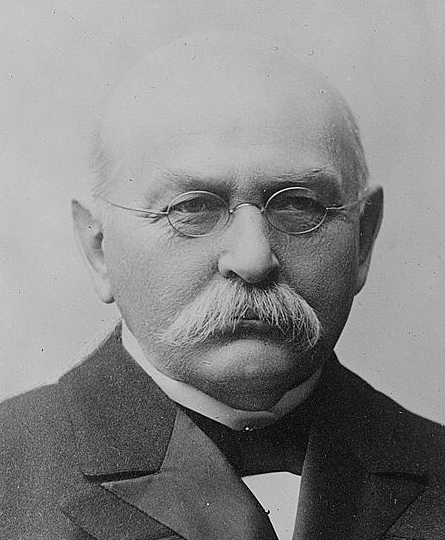
- Knudsen

Prime Minister of Norway
- In office 31 January 1913 – 21 June 1920
- Monarch: Haakon VII
- Preceded by: Jens Bratlie
- Succeeded by: Otto Bahr Halvorsen
- In office 19 March 1908 – 2 February 1910
- Monarch: Haakon VII
- Preceded by: Jørgen Løvland
- Succeeded by: Wollert Konow

Minister of Agriculture
- In office 31 January 1913 – 12 December 1919
- Prime Minister: Himself
- Preceded by: Erik Enge
- Succeeded by: Håkon Five
- In office 9 June 1903 – 22 October 1903
- Prime Minister: Otto Blehr
- Preceded by: Wollert Konow (H)
- Succeeded by: Christian Mathiesen

Minister of Finance
- Acting; 12 December 1919 – 21 June 1920
- Prime Minister: Himself
- Preceded by: Anton Omholt
- Succeeded by: Edvard H. Bull
- In office 19 March 1908 – 2 February 1910
- Prime Minister: Himself
- Preceded by: Magnus Halvorsen
- Succeeded by: Abraham Berge
- In office 11 March 1905 – 31 October 1905
- Prime Minister: Christian Michelsen
- Preceded by: Christian Michelsen
- Succeeded by: Christian Michelsen
- In office 9 June 1903 – 22 October 1903
- Prime Minister: Otto Blehr
- Preceded by: Elias Sunde
- Succeeded by: Birger Kildal

Minister of Auditing
- In office 31 January 1913 – 30 June 1918
- Prime Minister: Himself
- Preceded by: Jens Bratlie
- Succeeded by: Position abolished
- In office 19 March 1908 – 2 February 1910
- Prime Minister: Himself
- Preceded by: Sven Aarrestad
- Succeeded by: Wollert Konow
- In office 11 March 1905 – 7 June 1905
- Prime Minister: Christian Michelsen
- Preceded by: Paul B. Vogt
- Succeeded by: Harald Bothner
- Acting; 30 March 1903 – 9 June 1903
- Prime Minister: Otto Blehr
- Preceded by: Wollert Konow (H)
- Succeeded by: Otto Blehr

Personal details
- Born: Aanon Gunerius Knudsen; 19 September 1848 Saltrød, Nedenes, United Kingdoms of Sweden and Norway
- Died: 1 December 1928 (aged 80) Skien, Telemark, Norway
- Party: Liberal
- Spouse: Anna Sofie Cappelen (m. 1880; died 1915)
- Children: 5

Gunnar Knudsen (19 September 1848 – 1 December 1928), born Aanon Gunerius Knudsen, was a Norwegian politician from the Liberal Party who served as the prime minister of Norway twice from 1908 to 1910 and from 1913 to 1920. He also inherited a shipping company, and founded the shipping company Borgestad ASA.

== Early life and education ==
Knudsen was born in 1848 at the medium-sized farm Saltrød in Østre Moland Municipality (later it was in Stokken Municipality, and now it's part of Arendal Municipality) in Nedenes county, Norway. His father Christen Knudsen (1813–1888) was a sea captain and ship-owner, whose ancestors had lived at the farm for several generations. His mother Guro Aadnesdatter (1808–1900) had grown up at one of the smaller farms in Saltrød which her father had bought. Her farther hailed from Vegusdal Municipality. A brother of Gunnar died in 1855, his two living siblings were Jørgen Christian Knudsen (born 1843) and Ellen Serine (born 1846) who married Johan Jeremiassen (he also had four sisters ).

Christen Knudsen established a shipyard in Arendal in 1851, but in 1855 he and the family moved to Frednes in Porsgrunn. Gunnar Knudsen started studying at Chalmers University of Technology in Gothenburg, Sweden in 1865 where he got a degree as engineer in 1867.

== Business career ==
Returning to Norway, he started working at Aker's Mechanical Workshop and then went to England where he studied ship building technics at Piles Shipyard in Sunderland. The first ship he designed for the family's shipyard was Gambetta, named after the French politician Léon Gambetta. It was launched in 1871. The stay in England convinced Knudsen that the days of sail ships would soon be over and that the family business needed to start building steam ships in the future.

Gunnar and his brother Jørgen Christian took over the shipyard from their father in 1872. In the following years they would also take over ships their father owned and the brothers formed a shipyard and shipping company together: J.C. og G. Knudsen. In the period until 1879, Knudsen designed five ships for the company. He named the fifth Crossroad; it was the last sail ship he designed. In 1904, he merged his interests in three steam ship companies into Borgestad Shipping AS.

== Political career ==
In 1886, he became the mayor of Gjerpen Municipality and in 1891 he was county governor of Telemark. In 1891 Knudsen was elected to the Storting, becoming parliamentary leader in 1908 and party leader from 1909 to 1927. He was elected Prime Minister in 1908 and 1913. In social policy, Knudsen's time as prime minister saw the passage of the Sickness insurance Law of September 1909, which provided compulsory coverage for employees and workers below a certain income limit, representing approximately 45% of all wage earners. That same year, the state approved free midwife services for unmarried mothers. In 1915, free midwife services were extended to the wives of men included under the national health insurance scheme.

== Personal life ==
Gunnar Knudsen married Anna Sofie Cappelen (1854–1915) in 1880, and together they had five children, born between 1882 and 1893; Erik, Christen, Gudrun, Margit and Rolf. Margit, married Schiøtt, was elected to the national parliament in 1945. Christen Knudsen had a son Knut Andreas Knudsen who became a politician as well.

== See also ==
- Knudsen's First Cabinet
- Knudsen's Second Cabinet

== Sources ==
- Nissen, Bernt August (1957). Gunnar Knudsen. (Oslo: Aschehoug).

Political offices
| Preceded by Jørgen Løvland | Prime Minister of Norway; 1908–1910 | Succeeded by Wollert Konow |
| Preceded by Jens Bratlie | Prime Minister of Norway; 1913–1920 | Succeeded by Otto Bahr Halvorsen |
