= Otto Blehr =

Norwegian politician (1847–1927)

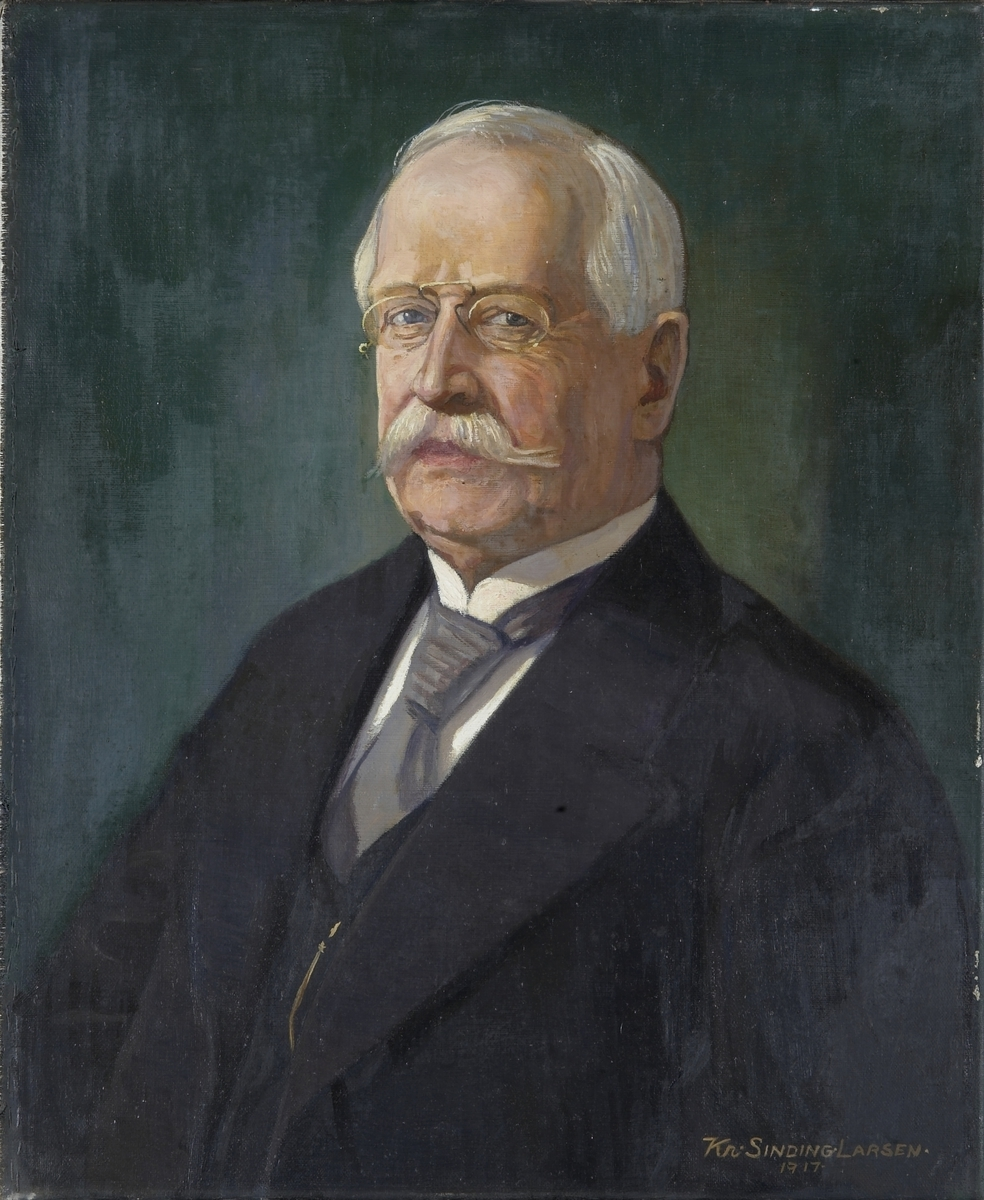
- 1917 painting of Blehr by Kristoffer Sindig-Larsen

Prime Minister of Norway
- In office 22 June 1921 – 6 March 1923
- Monarch: Haakon VII
- Preceded by: Otto B. Halvorsen
- Succeeded by: Otto B. Halvorsen
- In office 21 April 1902 – 22 October 1903
- Monarch: Oscar II
- Preceded by: Johannes Steen
- Succeeded by: Francis Hagerup

Minister of Finance
- In office 22 June 1921 – 6 March 1923
- Prime Minister: Himself
- Preceded by: Edvard H. Bull
- Succeeded by: Abraham Berge
- In office 23 April 1915 – 16 July 1915; Acting
- Prime Minister: Gunnar Knudsen
- Preceded by: Anton Omholt
- Succeeded by: Anton Omholt

Minister of Justice
- In office 1 May 1917 – 21 June 1920
- Prime Minister: Gunnar Knudsen
- Preceded by: Andreas Urbye
- Succeeded by: Otto B. Halvorsen

Minister of Trade
- In office 1 January 1903 – 22 October 1903
- Prime Minister: Himself
- Preceded by: Position established
- Succeeded by: Jakob Schøning

Minister of the Interior
- In office 21 April 1902 – 1 January 1903
- Prime Minister: Himself
- Preceded by: Johannes Steen
- Succeeded by: Position abolished

Minister of Auditing
- In office 9 June 1903 – 22 October 1903
- Prime Minister: Himself
- Preceded by: Wollert Konow (H)
- Succeeded by: Birger Kildal

Norwegian Prime Minister in Stockholm
- In office 17 February 1898 – 21 April 1902
- Prime Minister: Johannes Steen
- Preceded by: Gregers Gram
- Succeeded by: Ole Anton Qvam
- In office 6 March 1891 – 2 May 1893
- Prime Minister: Johannes Steen
- Preceded by: Gregers Gram
- Succeeded by: Gregers Gram

Personal details
- Born: 17 February 1847 Stange, Hedmark, United Kingdoms of Sweden and Norway
- Died: 13 July 1927 (aged 80) Oslo, Norway
- Party: Liberal
- Spouse: Randi Blehr
- Children: Eivind Blehr
- Profession: Jurist

Otto Albert Blehr (17 February 1847 – 13 July 1927) was a Norwegian statesman, attorney and newspaper editor who was the prime minister of Norway from 1902 to 1903 during the Union between Sweden and Norway and from 1921 to 1923 following the dissolution of the union between Norway and Sweden. He represented the Liberal Party.

== Biography ==
Blehr grew up on a farm in Stange Municipality in Hedmark county, Norway. His parents were Albert Blehr (1805–1872) and Maren Wilhelmine Ludovica Kathinka Stenersen (1818–1877). His father was a doctor and physicist at Sanderud Hospital.

He graduated in 1865 and then began studying the University of Christiania. Blehr graduated cand.jur. in 1871. He served as parliamentary reporter for the newspapers Dagbladet and Bergens Tidende. In 1874, he was one of the founders of the Fjordabladet where he served as the first editor-in-chief until 1882. In 1878, he also started and served as the first editor of the Sogns Tidende. Blehr was the county governor of Nordre Bergenhus (1883–1888) and for Nordland (1895–1900).

In 1877, he established himself as a prosecutor at Lærdal Municipality in Sogn. In 1879, Blehr was elected as first deputy representative to the Storting for Nordre Bergenhus amt (now part of Vestland county) and from 1883 to 1888 he was a permanent representative. In the fall of 1888 he was not re-elected to the Storting.

He later became a prosecutor (fogd) in Sunnfjord and Nordfjord. In 1889, he became a lawyer in Hålogaland. He held this assignment until he became a judge (lagmann) in Kristiania in 1893. In 1894, Blehr was again elected to the Storting, now for Nordland. Blehr was re-elected as parliamentary deputy for Nordland in 1898. On 21 April 1902, he took over as Prime Minister of the Norwegian government in Kristiania.

In October 1903, Blehr resigned as a result of an election defeat. In 1905 he was appointed as County Governor (stiftsamtmann) at Christiania (now Oslo), an office he held until 1921. On 21 June 1921, Otto Blehr became prime minister (again) and at the same time also chief of the Ministry of Finance. He was also a member of the Norwegian delegation to the League of Nations in 1920 and from 1922–1925. On 3 March 1923 his government resigned and he left office.

== Personal life ==
He married women's rights activist Randi Blehr (1851–1928) in 1876. Both were co-founders of the Norwegian Association for Women's Rights, where his wife later became president. Otto Blehr was awarded the Grand Cross of the Order of St. Olav in 1898. He was also the auditor of the Norwegian Nobel Committee from 1903 to his death in Oslo during 1927. He was the father of Eivind Blehr, a minister in the Quisling regime in World War II.

Political offices
| Preceded by Johannes Steen | Prime Minister of Norway; 1902–1903 | Succeeded by George Francis Hagerup |
| Preceded by Otto Bahr Halvorsen | Prime Minister of Norway; 1921–1923 | Succeeded by Otto Bahr Halvorsen |
