= Otto Bahr Halvorsen =

14th Prime Minister of Norway (1872–1923)

- Bahr Halvorsen in 1921.

Prime Minister of Norway
- In office 21 June 1920 – 22 June 1921
- Monarch: Haakon VII
- Preceded by: Gunnar Knudsen
- Succeeded by: Otto Blehr
- In office 6 March 1923 – 23 May 1923
- Monarch: Haakon VII
- Preceded by: Otto Blehr
- Succeeded by: Abraham Berge

Minister of Justice
- In office 21 June 1920 – 22 June 1921
- Prime Minister: Himself
- Preceded by: Otto Blehr
- Succeeded by: Olaf Amundsen
- In office 6 March 1923 – 23 May 1923
- Prime Minister: Himself
- Preceded by: Arnold Holmboe
- Succeeded by: Christian L. Rolfsen

Leader of the Conservative Party
- In office 1919 – 23 May 1923
- Preceded by: Jens Bratlie
- Succeeded by: Ivar Lykke

Personal details
- Born: 28 May 1872 Christiania, United Kingdoms of Sweden and Norway
- Died: 23 May 1923 (aged 50) Christiania, Norway
- Party: Conservative
- Spouse: Kathrine Hofgaard (m. 1899)

Otto Bahr Halvorsen (28 May 1872 – 23 May 1923) was a Norwegian lawyer and politician from the Conservative Party, who served as the prime minister of Norway from 1920 to 1921 and again in 1923 up until his death in office.

== Background ==
Halvorsen was born in Kristiania (now Oslo, Norway) to Otto Hellen Halvorsen (1840–1921) and Karine Christine Christiansen (1847–1927). He attended Kristiania Cathedral School. He studied law at the University of Kristiania where he completed his examen artium in 1890. As a licensed attorney, in 1904 he opened a law firm in Kristiania.

== Political career ==
In 1912 Halvorsen was first elected to the Storting from the neighborhood of Gamle Aker in the district of St. Hanshaugen in Kristiania. Halvorsen served Kristiania in the Parliament from the Conservative Party from 1913 to 1923. He became Prime Minister during 1920 while also serving as Minister of Justice. He again became Prime Minister in May 1923 while simultaneously serving as Minister of Justice. Between these terms, Halvorsen was leader of the Conservative Party in Parliament and President of the Storting (stortingspresident). However, he became gravely ill in March 1923, just a few days after forming his government, and died of cancer on the 23rd of May that same year.

== Personal life ==
In 1899, he was married to Kathrine Hofgaard (1875–1960), daughter of Simon Wright Hofgaard and Ida Mathilde Aars.

Political offices
Preceded by Gunnar Knudsen	Prime Minister of Norway; 1920–1921	Succeeded by Otto Blehr
Preceded by Otto Blehr	Prime Minister of Norway; 1923	Succeeded by Abraham Berge
