= Michelet =

People with the last name Michelet include the following. When used alone in an encyclopedic context, Michelet will generally refer to Jules.

- Albert Michelet (1869–1928), French sailor and Olympian
- Athénaïs Michelet (1826–1899), French natural history writer and memoirist
- Åse Aulie Michelet (born 1952), Norwegian businessperson
- Carl Johan Michelet (1826–1902), Norwegian lawyer and politician
- Christian Frederik Michelet (1792–1874), Norwegian military officer
- Christian Fredrik Michelet (businessman) (1891–1962), Norwegian military officer and businessperson
- Christian Fredrik Michelet (major) (1860–1935), Norwegian military officer and equestrian
- Christian Fredrik Michelet (politician) (1863–1927), Norwegian lawyer and politician
- Edmond Michelet (1899–1970), French politician
- Else Michelet (1942–2021), Norwegian journalist
- Émile Michelet (1867–unknown), French sailor and Olympian
- Jean Jacques Michelet, birth name of John Jacob Mickley (1697–1769), American settler
- Jon Michelet (1944–2018), Norwegian novelist
- Jørgen Michelet (1742–1818), Norwegian military officer
- Jules Michelet (1798–1874), French historian
- Karl Ludwig Michelet (1801–1893), German philosopher
- Marie Michelet (1866–1951), Norwegian writer
- Maren Michelet (1869–1932), American teacher and promoter of Scandinavian culture
- Paul Michelet (1880–1958), Norwegian equestrian
- Simon Michelet (1863–1942), Norwegian theologian
