= Christian Fredrik Michelet =

Christian Fredrik Michelet may refer to:

- Christian Fredrik Michelet (politician) (1863–1927), Norwegian lawyer and politician for the Conservative Party
- Christian Fredrik Michelet (major) (1860–1935), Norwegian military officer and equestrian
- Christian Fredrik Michelet (businessman) (1891–1962), Norwegian military officer and businessperson
- Christian Frederik Michelet (1792–1874), Norwegian military officer
