= Wergeland =

Wergeland is a Norwegian surname. Notable people with the surname include:

- Agnes Mathilde Wergeland, Norwegian-American historian
- Camilla (Wergeland) Collett, Norwegian feminist writer, sister of Henrik
- Harald Wergeland, Norwegian physicist
- Harald Nicolai Storm Wergeland, Norwegian military officer, and politician
- Henrik Wergeland, Norwegian writer, playwright, historian and linguist
- Joseph Frantz Oscar Wergeland, Norwegian military officer, brother of Henrik
- Nicolai Wergeland, Norwegian priest, writer and politician
- Oscar Wergeland, Norwegian painter

== See also ==
- Wergeland Township, Minnesota in Yellow Medicine County, US
