= Carl Søyland =

Norwegian-American journalist

Carl Søyland (May 19, 1894 – December 1978) was a Norwegian born, American author, reporter, editor and community leader.

== Background ==
Carl Søyland was born in Bergen, Norway. He was the son of Tønnes James Søyland (1859–1917) and Kristiane Nilsen (1868–1953). Søyland grew up in Flekkefjord in Vest-Agder, Norway. He immigrated to the United States in 1919 at 25 years of age. In 1926, Søyland settled in the Bay Ridge area of Brooklyn. Søyland was the editor-in-chief of Nordisk Tidende from 1940 until his retirement in 1963. Founded in 1891, Nordisk Tidende (now Norwegian American Weekly) was a Norwegian language weekly newspaper published by the Norwegian News Company in Brooklyn, New York.

== Career ==
Søyland was decorated in 1946 for his weekly news broadcasts from New York City to Norway during World War II. In 1950 he received the Royal Norwegian Order of St. Olav from Haakon VII, the King of Norway for advancing the cause and culture of Norway through his writings, and in 1959 King Olav V awarded him Norway's highest honor, the Commander of St. Olaf medal. Søyland wrote two books in Norwegian: Along the Highway and Byway in 1929 and Written in the Sand in 1954. Carl Søyland died in Brooklyn, New York.

== Other sources ==
- Rygg, Andreas Nilsen (1941) Norwegians in New York, 1825—1925 (Brooklyn, New York: Norwegian News Co.)
- Rygg, Andreas Nilsen (1947) American Relief for Norway: A survey of American relief work for Norway during and after the Second World War (Chicago, Illinois: Arnesen Press)
- Lovoll, Odd (2010) Norwegian Newspapers in America: Connecting Norway and the New Land (Minnesota Historical Society Press) ISBN 978-0-87351-772-0
