= Storjohann =

Storjohann is a surname. Notable people with the surname include:

- Gero Storjohann (1958–2023), German politician
- Johan Storjohann (1832–1914), Norwegian priest, educator, and non-fiction writer
- Nanna Storjohann (1838–1898), Norwegian proponent for public morals, wife of Johan
- Sage Storjohann (1998-Present), American Author, poet
