= Marie Joys =

Norwegian nurse and educator (1872–1944)

- Born: 2 June 1872; Bergen, Norway
- Died: 21 November 1944 (aged 72); Bergen, Norway
- Occupations: Nurse and nursing teacher
- Years active: 48
- Parents: Wessel Joachim Reehorst Joys (father); Lina Storjohann (mother)
- Relatives: Niece of Nanna and Johan C. H. Storjohann, cousin of Marie Michelet
- Awards: King's Medal of Merit, Florence Nightingale Medal

Marie Elisabeth Joys (2 June 1872 – 21 November 1944) was a Norwegian nurse and nursing teacher.

== Life ==
She was born in Bergen as a daughter of teacher and military officer Wessel Joachim Reehorst Joys (1841–1922) and Lina Storjohann (1841–1925). On the maternal side she was a niece of Nanna and Johan C. H. Storjohann, and a first cousin of Marie Michelet.

After primary school, Joys travelled to Berlin in 1892 to undergo nursing education at the institution Victoriahaus. While studying she was a subordinate nurse at Friedrichshain Hospital, and after graduating in 1895 she was hired as a chief nurse there, only 23 years of age. In 1897 she was persuaded to return to Bergen, where she was offered the job as chief nurse at the Bergen Municipal Hospital surgical department. She stayed here until her retirement in 1933.

She was credited (together with Camilla Struve and Betty Bull) with planning and establishing the first three-year nursing education in Norway. This started at Bergen Municipal Hospital in 1908. At this course they also pioneered the pre-training school, a theoretical course that aspiring nurses had to attend before entering the practical training. This idea was soon adapted by other nursing educators as well as the Norwegian Nurses' Union. Joys was a co-founder of the Norwegian Nurses' Union in 1912.

During the First Balkan War, during the winter of 1912–1913, Joys volunteered at an Ottoman military hospital in Constantinople. She thus became known as one of the first nurses to volunteer in a catastrophic setting abroad—already from her study days she had been an admirer of Florence Nightingale. In 1948 she issued her memoirs, Erindringer, where she described the war among other things.

Arntzen was awarded the King's Medal of Merit in gold in 1923 and the international Florence Nightingale Medal from the Red Cross in 1937. She did not marry. She died in November 1944 in Bergen.
