= Johannes B. Wist =

Norwegian-American journalist (1864–1923)

Johannes B. Wist (6 April 1864 –1 December 1923) was a Norwegian American newspaper editor, journalist and author.

== Biography ==
Born Johannes Racinus Benjaminsen, he was the son of Benjamin Olaus Johansen Wist (1829–97) and Magdalena Arnoldusdatter Sliper (1836–66). He was born on the Sund farm in Inderøy Municipality in Nord-Trøndelag county, Norway. He immigrated to the United States in 1884 during his early 20s. He lived in Minnesota and Wisconsin prior to settling in Decorah, Iowa.

Wist served as editor of a number of Norwegian-language newspaper serving the immigrant Norwegian American community. He was the editor of Fakkelen (Glenwood, Minnesota 1885–1886), Arbeitets Ridder (Minneapolis, Minnesota 1886–1887), Skandinavisk Tribune (Madison, Wisconsin 1887–1888), Nordvesten (St. Paul, Minnesota 1889–1897), and Norge (Granite Falls, Minnesota 1899–1900).

Most notable Wist was the editor of the Decorah-Posten from 1901 until his death in 1923. During the period 1905 to 1914, he additionally was the founder and co-editor of Symra, a literary magazine which was also published in Decorah, Iowa. In 1914, he edited a survey of the Norwegian-American press entitled Norsk-amerikanernes festskrift (Decorah, Iowa: Symra Co., 1914). Wist was also the Norwegian vice-consul of the State of Iowa from 1906 to 1917.

Wist wrote a column in Decorah-Posten about a fictional Norwegian pioneer named Jonas Olsen. Originally published serially during the 1920s, the stories were subsequently published in book form. With translation by Orm Øverland, professor at the University of Bergen, the book has been published in English as The Rise of Jonas Olsen: A Norwegian Immigrant's Saga (University of Minnesota Press; 2005)

== Personal life ==
Wist was a Progressive Republican who held membership in the Norwegian Lutheran Synod. In 1885, Wist married Josephine Aasve (1859-1938) who was the daughter of Norwegian immigrants. They were the parents of four children: Clara, Benjamin, Annie and Joseph.

== Other sources ==
- Hoerder, Dirk and Christiane Harzig (1987) Migrants from Northern Europe. The immigrant labor press in North America, 1840s–1970s (New York: Greenwood Press)
- Øverland, Orm (1996) The Western Home: A Literary History of Norwegian America (Norwegian-American Historical Association)
- Øverland, Orm (2000) Minds, American Identities: Making the United States Home, 1870–1930 (University of Illinois Press)
