= Bolette Gjør =

Norwegian writer and missionary

Should not be confused with Bolette Margrethe Nissen, born 1849, the mother-in-law of Hartvig Johannson.

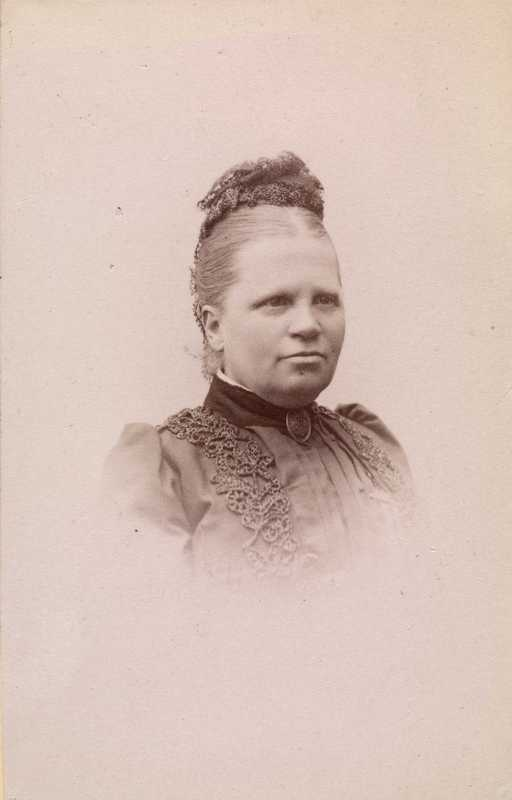
Bolette Gjør, c. 1880s

Bolette Margrethe Gjør, née Nissen (11 May 1835 – 4 November 1909) was a Norwegian writer and inner missionary.

== Early life ==
She was born in Trondheim as a daughter of merchant Martinus Nissen (1800–1836) and Ida Susanne Amalie Hagerup (1808–85). After her father died when she was only one year old, her mother remarried and they moved to Romedal. She was a sister of Rikke Nissen, niece of Hartvig Nissen, grandniece of Henrich Steffens and a first cousin of Prime Minister Francis Hagerup. In October, 1872, she married vicar Julius Gjør (1839–1916), a son of Magnus A. Gjør.

== Education ==
She attended her uncle's Nissen Girls School from 1849, and later learnt English. In her early twenties she underwent a Christian awakening in the milieu surrounding Gisle Johnson. She dedicated the rest of her life to missionary organizational work for women, inspired by the practical work of Gustava Kielland and the pious ideas of Henriette Gislesen.

== Career ==
Her missionary work really started in 1862, having moved back to Romedal Municipality where she ran her own school and Sunday school, missionary women's association and care for the poor. In 1873, she followed her husband who became vicar for the parish of Stor-Elvdal Municipality, in 1878 further to the recently built St. Jacob's Church, Oslo. In Kristiania, she became a teacher at the Christiania Deaconess House (Diakonissehuset Christiania), now Lovisenberg Diaconal University College which was founded by Cathinka Guldberg. She founded later women's missionary societies. The number of such societies rose from about 1,700 to 3,500 during Gjør's time. They were not formally connected to the Norwegian Missionary Society (Det Norske Misjonsselskap), where women did not have voting rights, but nonetheless contributed with two thirds of the organization's income. Gjør gathered support to grant women elective rights in the Norwegian Missionary Society, an endeavor which became successful in 1904. She was also a member of the discussion Club of 1903, founded by Marie Michelet and Fredrikke Aars, and founded the Missionary Workers' Ring in 1907 together with Henny Dons among others. She also led the Mission School for Women from 1900 to 1909.

Between 1884 and 1894 she issued fifteen books under the pen name Margrethe. She edited the Norwegian Missionary Society's magazine for women, Missionslæsning for Kvindeforeninger from its inauguration in 1884 as well as Børnebibliotheket, the magazine issued by the Norwegian Sunday School Association (Norsk Søndagsskoleforbund) from 1893 to 1901.

She died in November 1909 in Kristiania.
