= Marie Michelet =

Norwegian writer and activist (1866–1951)

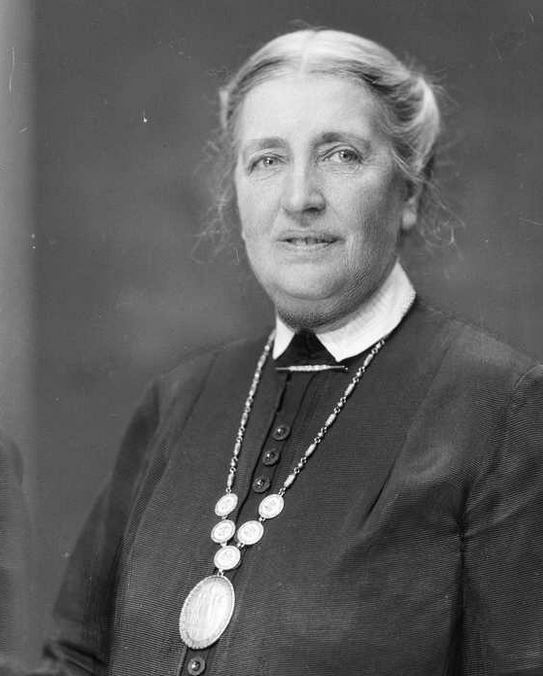
- Michelet in 1932
- Born: 10 March 1866; Bergen, Norway
- Disappeared: 3 April 1951 (aged 85)
- Died: Oslo, Norway
- Occupations: Writer, activist

Marie Elisabeth Michelet (née Storjohann; 10 March 1866 – 3 April 1951) was a Norwegian writer and activis.

== Personal life ==
She was born in Bergen as a daughter of priest Johan Cordt Harmens Storjohann (1832–1914) and Nanna Storjohann, née Holmboe (1838–1898). She spent several childhood years in London, where her father was stationed, and later attended school in Germany and the UK. She was a maternal granddaughter of Hans Holmboe and first cousin of Marie Joys.

In September 1888, he married theologian Simon Themstrup Michelet. The couple had three daughters, and one son who died young. Simon Michelet also had a sister named Marie (1872–1960); she married mathematician Elling Holst.

== Career ==
Michelet started her career in the public sphere as a children's writer. Her books were originally meant for her own children, but reached a wider audience. Titles include Puk (1901), Hos mormor (1902), I Svalehuset (1902) and Usynlige magter (1906). She was also a teacher at Sandvika Middle School from 1905 to 1910. They resided at Vallerlien in Bærum, where Simon Michelet's second cousin Christian Fredrik Michelet served as mayor.

In the 1910s, she mostly wrote books that supported Christianity, motherhood and family, such as Det kristne hjem (1913) and Den selverhvervende kvindelige ungdom (1915). She also began contributing extensively to periodicals and weekly magazines for women. Her organizational platform was Hjemmenes Vel ("Welfare of Homes"), which sought to improve domestic conditions for women and families. The first Hjemmenes Vel had been established in 1898, and in 1915 Michelet was a main initiator behind the foundation of Hjemmenes Vels Landsforbund, a national association. She chaired this organization from 1915 to 1934, overseeing the name change in 1933 to the Norwegian Housewives' Association (from 1997: the Norwegian Women and Family Association). Michelet also chaired the Nordic Housewives' Association from 1933 to 1937, whereupon she became honorary president, and was a leading figure in the International Council of Women.

Michelet also served as deputy chair of De norske sedelighetsforeninger, for the combat of vice, from 1902 to 1920. Locally she founded and chaired Asker and Bærum Women's Council from 1906 to 1921. Together with Henny Dons and Bolette Gjør among others, she founded the Missionary Workers' Ring in 1907. This became a member body of the Norwegian National Women's Council, where Michelet served on the board from 1907 to 1910.

Michelet was decorated with the King's Medal of Merit in gold in 1919 and as a Knight, First Class of the Order of St. Olav in 1946. She died on 3 April 1951, aged 85, in Oslo.

Preceded by position created	Chair of the Norwegian Housewives' Association; 1915–1934	Succeeded by Amalie Øvergaard
