= Arbeidets Ridder =

American newspaper

Arbeidets Ridder (Knights of Labor)
- Type: Weekly newspaper
- Founded: 1880s
- Language: Norwegian/Danish language
- City: Minneapolis, Minnesota
- Country: United States

Arbeidets Ridder was a Norwegian/Danish language weekly labor newspaper published from Minneapolis during the 1880s.

Arbeidets Ridder (which means Knight of Labour) was started on the initiative of the Scandinavian Labor and Sick Benefit Society. Politically, the paper was close to the Knights of Labor. The paper carried the subtitle Organ for the Scandinavian workers in the North-West.

Johannes B. Wist was the founding editor of the Arbeidets Ridder. He served as editor of the newspaper from 1886 until 1887. Johannes Wist later became editor of the newspaper Decorah-Posten from 1901 to 1923.
