= Christian Fredrik Michelet (major) =

Norwegian military officer and equestrian (1860–1935)

Christian Fredrik Michelet (25 April 1860 – 14 August 1935) was a Norwegian military officer and equestrian.

== Personal life ==
He was born in Christiania as a son of politician Carl Johan Michelet (1826–1902). He was a paternal grandson of Christian Fredrik Michelet (1792–1874), a first cousin of politician Christian Fredrik Michelet and second cousin of theologist Simon Michelet.

In 1899 at Ås in Hakadal he married Charlotte Elizabeth "Lizzie" Fearnley. She was a daughter of Thomas Fearnley (1841–1927) and a sister of Thomas Fearnley and N. O. Young Fearnley. She died in 1955.

== Career ==
He took secondary education, and underwent his officer's training in 1882. He studied riding in Saint-Cyr from 1882 to 1883, Hanover from 1890 to 1891 and horsebreeding and "racial hygiene" in England from 1897 to 1898. He held the rank of Premier Lieutenant from 1889, became Rittmester in 1896. He headed the Cavalry Riding School from 1903 to 1909, and retreated from the military to Landvernet in 1920. With the rank of Major, he led Oplandenes Dragonregiments Landvernkorps until November 1927.

His interest in riding and the cavalry also made him a pioneer within equestrianism in Norway. He was both an equestrian, and an official in relevant organizations. He chaired the Norwegian Equestrian Federation from 1915 to 1922, was a board member of the Norwegian Confederation of Sports (Norwegian: Norges Landsforbund for Idrett), and chaired other, more specialized horse organizations, as well as Øvrevoll Veddeløpsbane. He was credited for establishing the gallop racecourse at Øvrevoll, and also the racecourse at Gardermoen in 1921. He was nicknamed Ridemajoren ("the riding major"), and his portrait was painted by Per Krohg and displayed in Grand Café.

He was decorated with the King's Medal of Merit in Gold in 1918, and was a Knight, First Class of the Order of the Sword. He received commemorative medals from the 1912 Summer Olympics and the 1920 Summer Olympics. Michelet died at Snarøya in August 1935. Marshals at his funeral were Christian Fredrik Michelet, Jr. and Paul Michelet.
