= Arnold Christopher Ræstad =

Norwegian politician

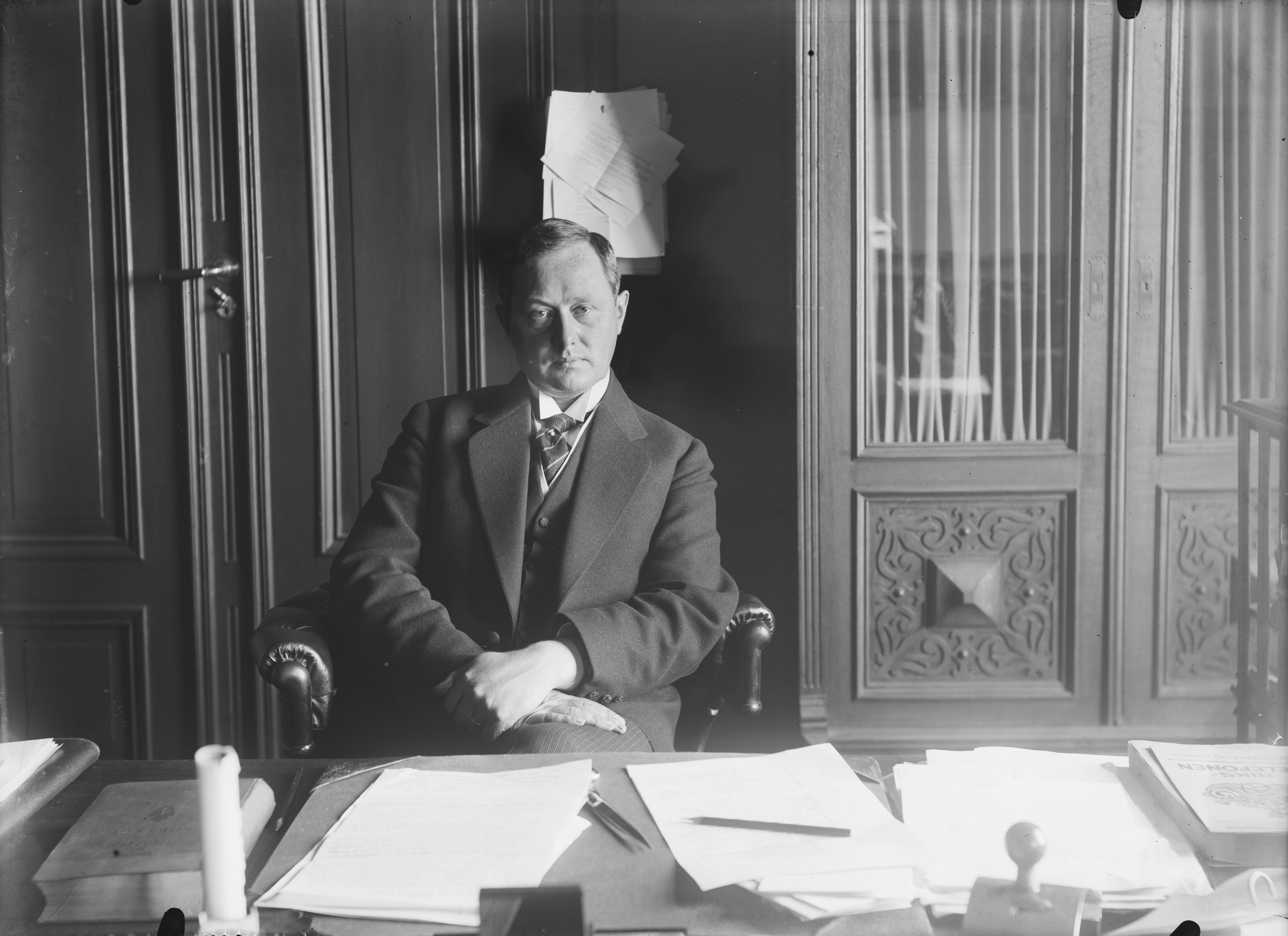
- Arnold Christopher Ræstad

Minister of Foreign Affairs
- In office 22 June 1921 – 31 May 1922
- Prime Minister: Otto Blehr
- Preceded by: Christian F. Michelet
- Succeeded by: Johan Ludwig Mowinckel

Personal details
- Born: 15 February 1878 Kristiania, Norway
- Died: 18 September 1945 (aged 67) Oslo, Norway
- Spouse: Märta Alexandra Maria Pauline Bratt
- Parent(s): Christopher Andreas Ræstad (1847–1904) and Maren Gjertine Monge (b. 1847)
- Education: University of Oslo
- Occupation: Lawyer
- Known for: Lawyer, politician, foreign minister of Norway

Arnold Christopher Ræstad (15 February 1878 – 18 September 1945) was a Norwegian lawyer, legal scholar, and politician. He was one of the "most influential" Norwegians in the early 20th century, but also among the "most controversial."

== Biography ==
Ræstad grew up in Kristiania, where he earned his examen artium in 1896. He entered the University of Oslo and earned his cand juris degree with the highest honors in 1900. In 1912, he was awarded a doctorate in law for his dissertation on maritime law, titled Kongens strømme (The King's Streams).

From 1906 to 1910 he worked as a secretary at the Norwegian Ministry of Foreign Affairs. His dissertation formed the backbone for Norwegian maritime policy until the concept of a continental shelf was established after World War II. More specifically, his academic work also formed the conceptual basis for Norway's claims to Spitsbergen. For most of his life, Ræstad made his living through his personal means, royalties from books, and speeching engagements.

He worked for short periods as an editor of Tidens Tegn, and as a university fellow in law. In 1921, he was appointed foreign minister in Otto Blehr's second cabinet, but was forced to resign after 11 months when he failed to secure a trade agreement with Spain and Portugal, countries that harbored animosity toward Norway during the Prohibition period (1919–1926).

In 1940, Ræstad took the initiative to form a broadcasting organization on behalf of the legal Norwegian government as it fled the country and took exile in London. He was part of the group that initiated Nortraship, acted as the president of Norges Bank in exile, and as the Norwegian delegate to the United Nations Conference on International Organization in San Francisco.

== Legacy ==
Although Ræstad had few official postings, his legacy has important points for Norwegian policy on several fronts:

- Ræstad was the subject of a personal attack by the editor of Morgenbladet, Nils Vogt about his appointment as foreign minister. Ræstad sued Vogt for libel but lost, as the court concluded that public individuals had to endure harsher treatment than others. This ruling continues to be a precedent in Norwegian law to this day, though the Tore Tønne case may have changed this.
- He was also active in the formation of the Norwegian Broadcasting Corporation, both as a private corporation and in the transition to a public utility. He was the chairman of the board and the de facto chief executive from 1933 to 1939, when he was bypassed as managing director due to alleged financial impropriety.
- He was an active proponent of transatlantic cooperation during and after World War II, and acted as an advisor to the exiled Cabinet Nygaardsvold.
- Ræstad was a prolific and influential writer. He wrote books and articles on maritime and international law; topics within economics, such as inflation, monopolies, currency, and trade; political ideology; and international crises. Altogether, he published 40 books in his own name and hundreds of articles.

== Selected works ==
- Europe and the Atlantic World (1958, posthumously), Norwegian Academy of Science and Letters
- La philosophie du droit international public (1949, posthumously, National Academy of Science and Letters
- Stat og nasjon i støpeskjeen : undersøkninger for bedre å forstå Europas krise, 1940
- Mémoire sur les procédures de changements pacifiques : contribution personnelle, 1937, League of Nations
- Penger, valuta, og gull, 1934

Political offices
Preceded by Christian Fredrik Michelet	Norwegian Minister of Foreign Affairs; 1921–1922	Succeeded by Johan Ludwig Mowinckel
