= Symra =

Norwegian language periodical

Symra was a Norwegian language periodical published between 1905 and 1914.

Symra; En Aarbog for Norske Paa Begge Sider Af Havet (Symra; an Annual for Norwegians on Both Sides of the Sea) was established to publish the literary works of Norwegian American authors, writers and poets. Johannes B. Wist and Kristian Prestgard, both editors of the Decorah-Posten, served as editors and publishers of Symra's first volumes. Symra was printed by Decorah-posten's trykkeri in the Lutheran Publishing House, now a primary building of the Vesterheim Norwegian-American Museum in Decorah, Iowa.

In 1912, the Symra Company was re-organized with Knut Gjerset of Luther College, and P. J. Eikeland of St. Olaf College serving as editors. As well the magazine, the Symra Company published Norwegian language books including: Ameriká og Andre Digte in 1912, and Efterladte Digte in 1914. Both were books of poems written by Agnes Mathilde Wergeland.

The pages of Symra featured a listing of notable Norwegian-American authors including: Peer Stromme, Knut Gjerset, Hjalmar Holand, Waldemar Ager, George T. Flom, Peter Laurentius Larsen, Ole Edvart Rølvaag, and Kristofer Janson.
