= Rikke Nissen =

Norwegian nursing teacher (1834–1892)

Ulrikke Eleonore "Rikke" Nissen (16 March 1834 – 10 January 1892) was a Norwegian nursing teacher; the first female nursing teacher in Norway.

She was born in Trondhjem as a daughter of merchant Martinus Nissen (1800–1836) and Ida Susanne Amalie Hagerup (1808–1885). Her father died when she was only one year old, and she grew up in Romedal Municipality after her mother married Severin Henrik Ræder (1800–1878). She was a sister of Bolette Gjør, niece of Hartvig Nissen, grandniece of Henrich Steffens, great-granddaughter of Martinus Lind Nissen and a first cousin of Prime Minister Francis Hagerup. She was an aunt of Claus Riiber.

She was homeschooled until 1847, when she enrolled in Lotz Girls School in Christiania. Her sister Bolette also moved to attend school in the capital, and underwent a religious awakening in the milieu of Gisle Johnson. Nissen became familiar with this awakening, and the network of women's missionary associations which her sister worked to establish. At the same time, in 1851 a Deaconess House was established in Stockholm, Sweden, to educate nurses in a Christian setting. Through numerous magazine articles Nissen began agitating for such an institution in Christiania.

In 1868 the Deaconess House (now: Lovisenberg Diaconal University College) was founded with Cathinka Guldberg as manager. Nissen travelled in Germany to study similar institutions there, and was subsequently hired as a teacher at the Deaconess House in 1870. In 1877 she wrote Norway's first textbook in nursing, Lærebog i Sygepleie, under the pseudonym R.N. The following year she visited a similar institution in Bergen; in 1878 her sister moved to Christiania and was hired at the Deaconess House as well. From 1884 to 1891 Nissen edited the magazine Fra Diakonissehuset.

Between 1885 and 1888 she stayed in Germany to overcome rheumatism. She wrote two books in German following this stay: Norwegische Bilder aus der Geschichte der weiblichen Diakonie, nebst anderen Liebeswerken (1886) and Henriette Gislesen und ihre Freunde. Ein Bild aus der norwegischen Kirche (1890). She died in January 1892 in Kristiania and was buried at Vår Frelsers gravlund.
