= Cathinka Guldberg =

Norwegian nurse

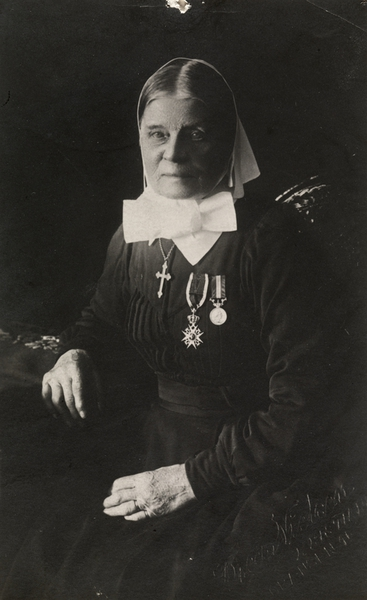
- Cathinka Guldberg circa 1915

Cathinka Augusta Guldberg (3 January 1840 – 22 October 1919) was a Norwegian nurse, educator and deaconess. She was associated with the development of nursing education in Norway.

== Biography ==
Guldberg was born in the city of Christiania (now Oslo), Norway. She was the eldest daughter of Cato August Guldberg (1812–1892), who was a parish priest. Her mother, Hanna Sophie Theresia Bull (1810–1854), was a cousin of Marcus Thrane (1817–1890), leader of the first Norwegian labour union. Her elder brothers included Cato Maximilian Guldberg (1836–1902).

When her mother died in 1854, Guldberg took on responsibility for her younger brothers and sister. She became interested in helping people, especially the sick and poor ones in her surroundings. In 1866 Guldberg went to Kaiserswerth, (Germany) to educate herself as a nurse and deaconess. She visited the Lutheran religious community at Kaiserswerth-am-Rhein, where she observed Pastor Theodor Fliedner and the deaconesses working with the sick and the deprived. Kaiserswerther Diakonie had been founded by Theodor Fliedner and his wife Friederike in 1836. Florence Nightingale had been a former student at this school.

Two years later she returned to Norway and at the age of 28 she established the Christiania Deaconess House (Diakonissehuset Christiania) and started Norway's first professional nursing program. The school was first situated at Grønland and from 1887 on its own grounds at Lovisenberg in Oslo, where the facility now known as Lovisenberg Deaconess college (Lovisenberg diakonale høgskole) still resides. Between 1886 and 1904, Henrik Thrap-Meyer was engaged as the architect in the development of the deaconess college in the district of St. Hanshaugen in Oslo.

Cathinka Guldberg was honoured with the Order of St. Olav in 1915 at the age of 75. She died in 1919 and was buried at Nordre gravlund in Oslo.

== See also ==
- Rikke Nissen
- Elizabeth Fedde
- Bolette Gjør
