= Jørgen Michelet =

Norwegian military officer (1742–1818)

Jørgen Michelet (1 June 1742 – 26 February 1818) was a Norwegian military officer.

He was born at Vølneberg in Sørum as a son of lieutenant colonel Christian Fredrik Michelet (1697–1769) and his second wife Johanne Christiane Augusta Holst. He was a grandson of Hans Michelet, uncle of Christian Frederik Michelet and granduncle of Carl Johan Michelet. He did not marry.

He attended the Mathematical School from 1758 to 1762. He reached the ranks of fenrik in 1760, second lieutenant in 1766, premier lieutenant in 1772, captain in 1785, rittmester in 1788, second major in 1790, premier major in 1794, lieutenant colonel in 1802, colonel in 1807 and major general in 1809.

He marked himself in the Battle of Kvistrum in the Theater War in 1788. He also participated in the Dano-Swedish War of 1808-1809. From 1809 to his retirement in May 1811 he led Trondhjem Dragoon Regiment. He retreated to become a farmer at Solberg in Trøgstad, where he died in February 1818.
