= Simon Michelet =

Norwegian theologian (1863–1942)

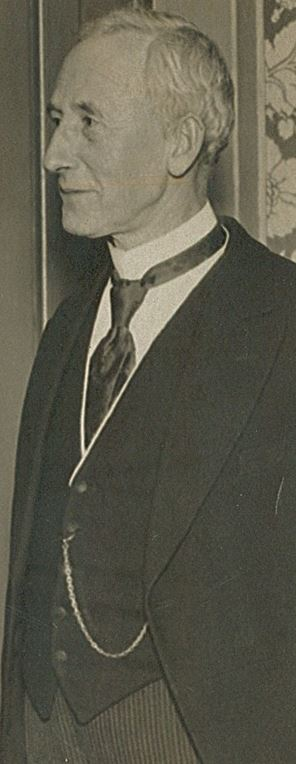
Simon pictured in the 1930s.

Simon Themstrup Michelet (8 February 1863 – 15 October 1942) was a Norwegian theologian. He was Professor of Theology at the University of Oslo.

== Background ==
He was born in Trondhjem (now spelled Trondheim), Norway. He was a son of customs officer Joseph Frantz Oscar Michelet (1832–1913) and Caroline Julie Laache (1833–1915). His grandfather was a brother of Christian Frederik Michelet and father of Carl Johan Michelet. On the paternal side he was a second cousin of major Christian Fredrik Michelet and politician Christian Fredrik Michelet. On the maternal side he was a first cousin of doctor and professor of medicine, Søren Bloch Laache (1854-1941).

He grew up in Hitra and Trondhjem. He finished his secondary education in 1881, and decided to study theology. He was taken into the home of priest Johan Storjohann, where he met his future wife Marie Storjohann (1866–1951). They married in September 1888. Simon's sister was named Marie as well, and she married Elling Holst.

== Career ==
He graduated with the cand.theol. degree in 1887 at the University of Kristiania and took the practical priest education in 1888. He also taught at Aars og Voss skole and Trondhjem Cathedral School from 1887 to 1888. In 1890, he continued his studies at German universities. He studied in Leipzig; first history of religion and Indian languages, then the theology of the New Testament. In 1894, he took the D.Theol. degree with the thesis Amos, oversat og fortolket on the Book of Amos.

He worked as a teacher and priest until being appointed as a professor of theology at the University of Kristiania in 1896. He was also a dean of the Faculty of Theology, and finally retired in 1933. He was also an editorial board member of Norsk Teologisk Tidsskrift from 1900 to 1926. He was a fellow of the Norwegian Academy of Science and Letters. Publications include Fra Moses til profetene (1915), Fra profetene til Jesus Kristus (1919) and Kristendom og rationalisme (1927). He also participated in a translation of the Old Testament.

He also chaired the Student Christian Movement in Norway from 1899 to 1903 and 1914 to 1924. He edited their magazine Excelsior from 1904 to 1917. He was also involved in social work. He was decorated as a Knight, First Class of the Order of St. Olav in 1911, and died in October 1942 in Bærum Municipality.

Academic offices
Preceded by	Dean of the Faculty of Theology, University of Oslo –	Succeeded by
