= Oscar Wergeland =

Norwegian painter (1844–1910)

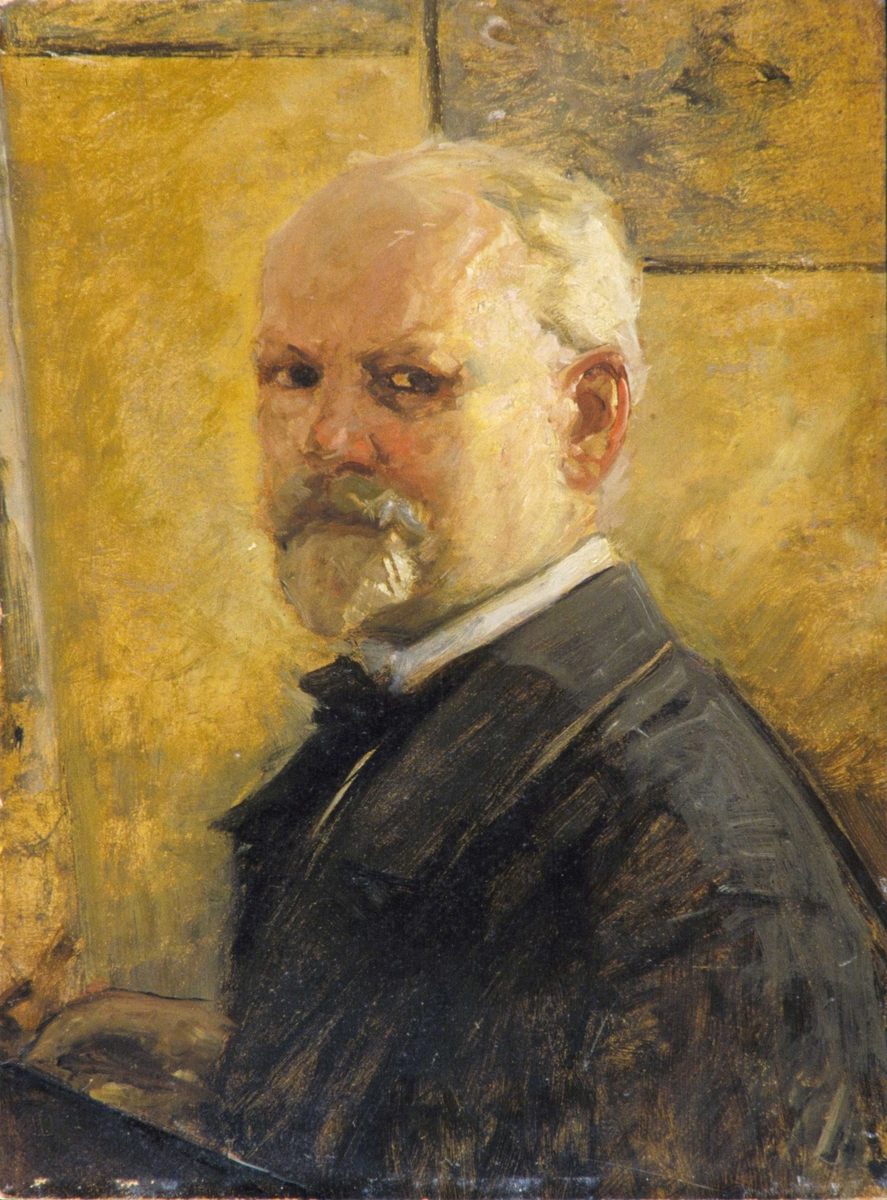
- Portrait of Oscar Wergeland
- Born: 12 October 1844; Christiania, Norway
- Died: 20 May 1910 (aged 65)
- Occupation: Painter
- Relatives: Agnes Wergeland (sister)

Oscar Arnold Wergeland (12 October 1844 – 20 May 1910) was a Norwegian painter. He is best known for his historical painting of the Constituent Assembly at Eidsvoll (Riksforsamlingen på Eidsvoll 1814). Two of his paintings are held in the National Gallery of Norway.

== Family ==
His parents were Sverre Nicolai Wergeland (1817–1896) and Anne Margrethe Larsen (1817–1889). His sister was Agnes Mathilde Wergeland (1857–1914), who emigrated to the United States and became known as an author. He was the great-nephew of Nicolai Wergeland, a priest, writer, and politician, and a member of the Norwegian Constituent Assembly at Eidsvoll. Hence Henrik Wergeland, Camilla Collett, and Joseph Frantz Oscar Wergeland were cousins of his father.

== Biography ==
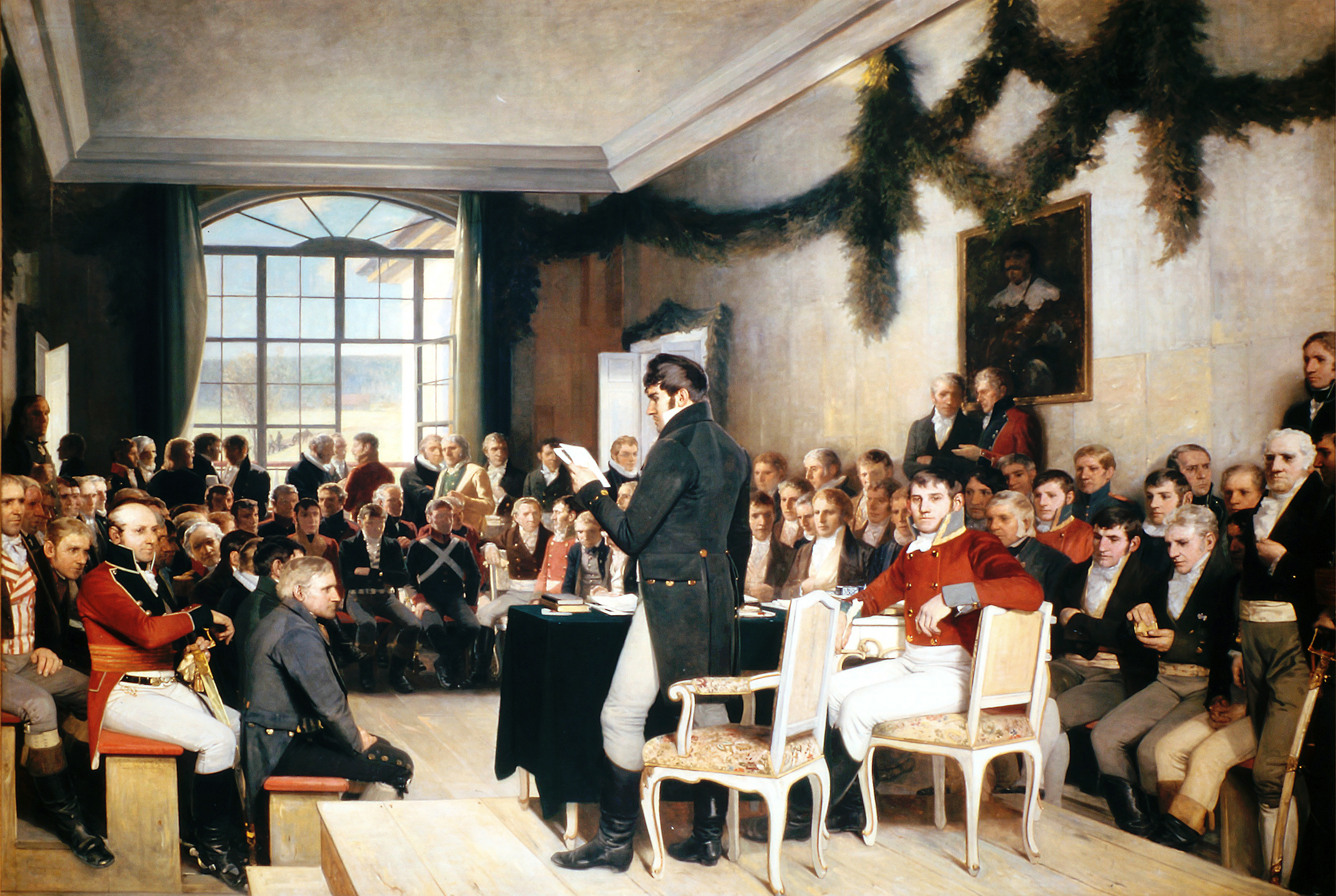
Riksforsamlingen på Eidsvoll 1814 (1885)

Wergeland was born in Oslo, Norway. Several of his siblings died early, and his father went to America around 1860. He was a student of David Arnesen (1818–1895) during 1859 and of the Norwegian National Academy of Craft and Art Industry from 1865 to 1867. He also attended the art school operated by Johan Fredrik Eckersberg (1822–1870) from 1865 to 1869. He was a student at the Copenhagen Royal Danish Academy of Fine Arts in 1869. He studied history painting in Munich 1874 – 1876, and lived in Munich until 1889. From 1889 he was teaching at the Norwegian National Academy of Craft and Art Industry in Kristiania.

The painting Riksforsamlingen på Eidsvoll 1814 was probably begun in 1882. Wergeland copied well over 60 portrait to get the result as credible as possible. The picture includes 55 portraits of the constitutional fathers. (Not all of the 112 persons are viewable.) Today it is located in the Norwegian Parliament, behind the speaker's platform and the presidential podium. The painting was used as the main reverse motif of Norwegian 100 kroner notes from 1962 to 1977. Additionally the painting appeared on several Norwegian postage stamps issued during 1918 for the 100th anniversary of the Constituent Assembly at Eidsvoll.

== Notable works ==
- Inga kongsmor betror Håkon Håkonsson til birkebeinerne (1869)
- Nordmennene lander på Island (1877)
- Frühschoppen, antakelig (1883)
- Gudstjeneste i en tysk landsbykirke, antakelig, (1883)
- Murere i arbeid, utvendig frise, antakelig (1892)
