= Agnes Wergeland =

American historian

- Born: May 8, 1857; Oslo, Norway
- Died: March 6, 1914 (aged 56); Laramie, Wyoming, United States
- Resting place: Greenhill Cemetery, Laramie, Albany County, Wyoming, US
- Education: University of Zurich, Hartvig Nissen School, University of Oslo, Ludwig-Maximilians-Universität München
- Partner: Grace Raymond Hebard

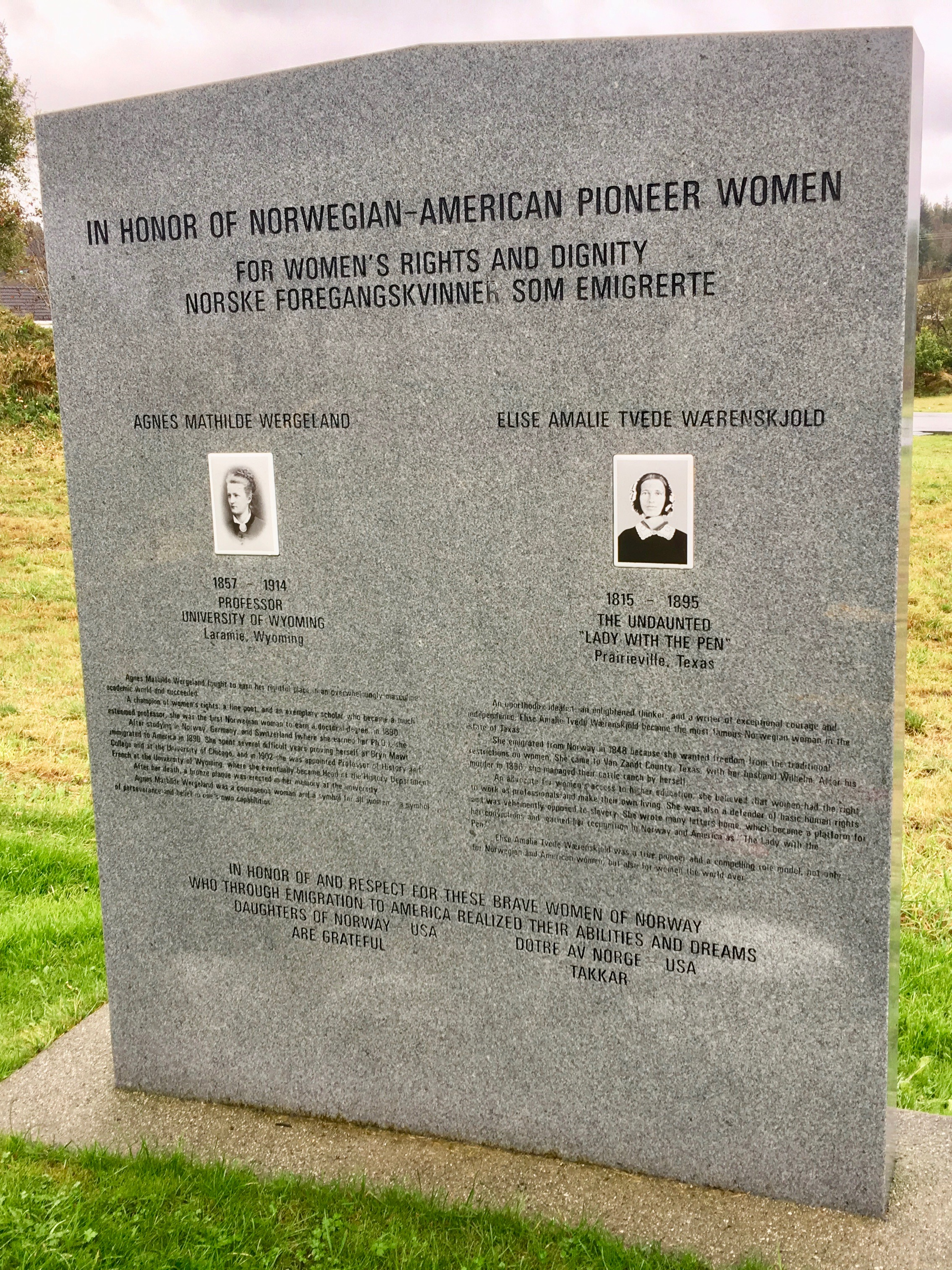
Memorial recognizing Agnes Wergeland & Elise Wærenskjold at Western Norway Emigration Center at Radøy

Agnes Mathilde Wergeland (May 8, 1857 – March 6, 1914) was a Norwegian-American historian, poet, and educator. Wergeland was the first woman ever to earn a doctoral degree in Norway.

== Early life and education ==
She attended Nissen Girls School in Christiania in 1879, studied independently Norwegian history, Greek and Roman architecture and sculpture, and medieval history at the University Library of Christiania from 1879 until 1883.

== Career ==
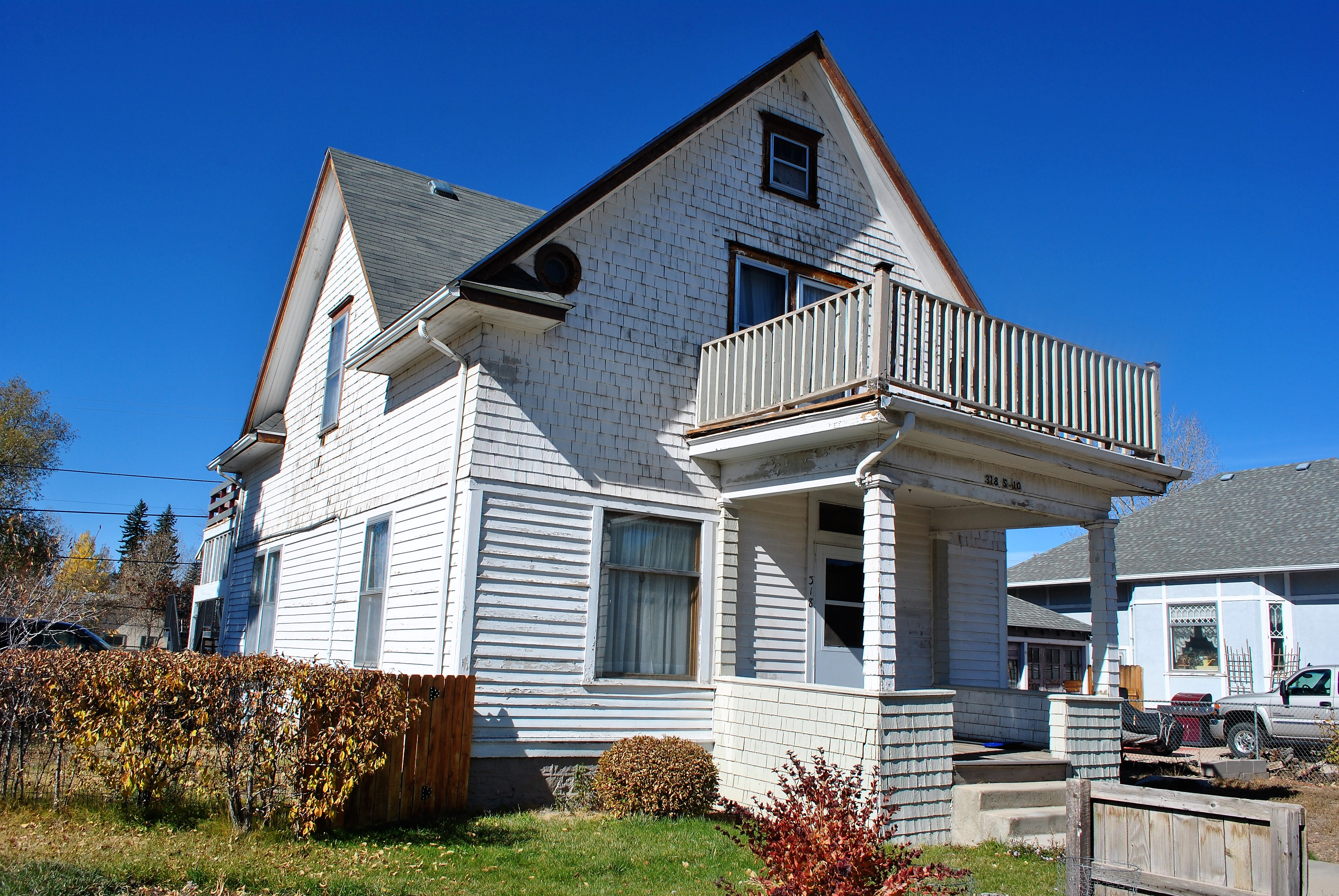
The Doctors' Inn in Laramie

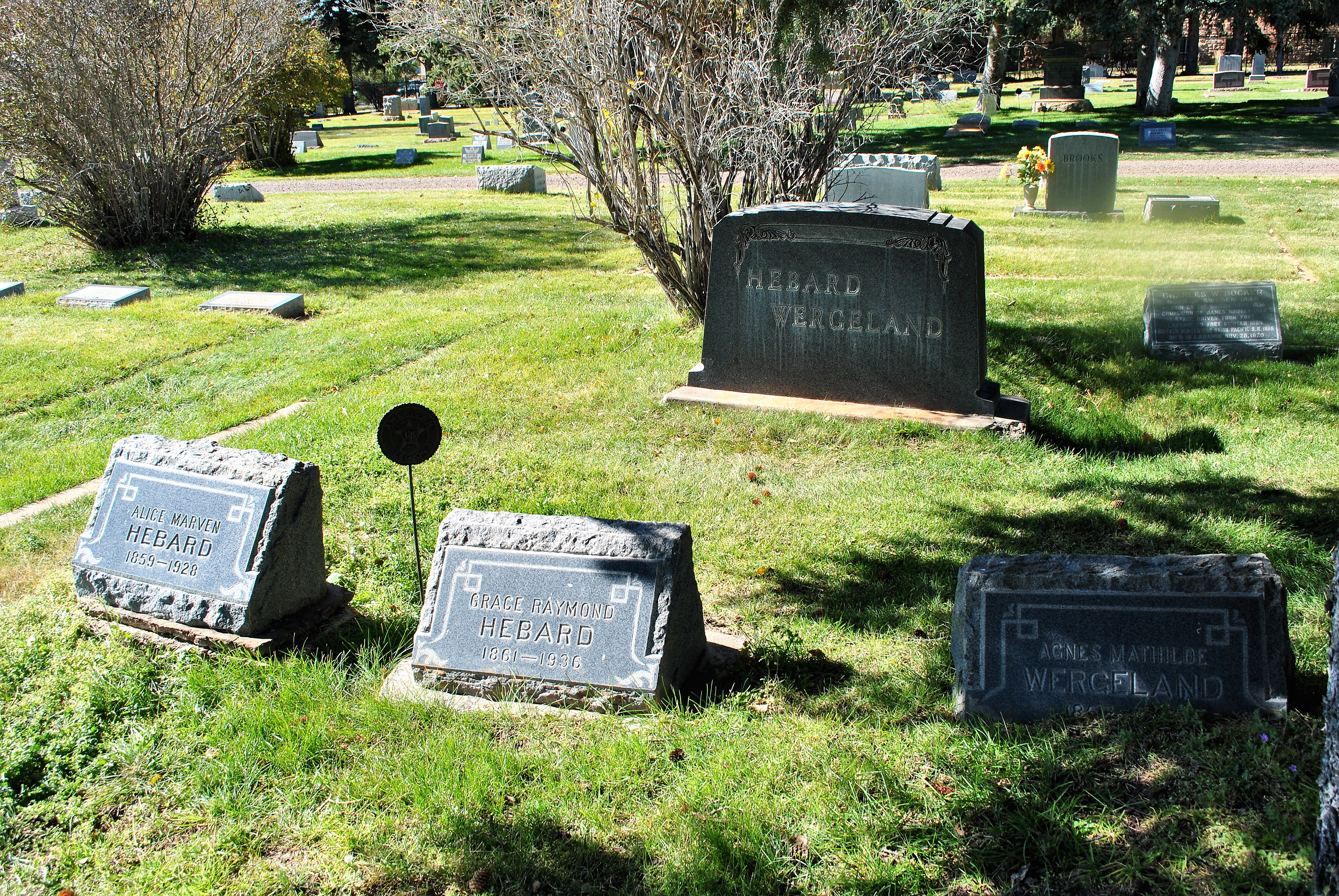
Hebard and Wergeland plot in Greenhill Cemetery

Wergeland wrote several scholarly works, three of which were published after her death. She also wrote two volumes of poetry which were published by Symra in Norwegian: Amerika, og andre digte (1912) and Efterladte digte (1914).

Wergeland lived with Grace Raymond Hebard, and Grace's sister, Alice, in the home she built with Hebard in Laramie, known to students and colleagues as "The Doctors Inn". Wergeland died in 1914. Grace's sister, Alice Marvin Hebard, died in 1928, and Hebard in 1938.

Wergeland remained at the University of Wyoming history professor until her death. Before she died at age 57, she testified her book collection to the library of the University of Wyoming. She is buried alongside Grace Raymond Hebard at Greenhill Cemetery, Laramie, Albany County, Wyoming.

== Legacy ==
In 1916, Maren Michelet wrote a biography Glimt fra Agnes Mathilde Wergelands liv. She also wrote an English language translation, Glimpses from Agnes Mathilde Wergeland's life. Both editions were published by Folkebladet Publishing Company which Sven Oftedal had organized in 1877 in order to promote Norwegian language publications in the United States.

Agnes Mathilde Wergeland Lodge of the Daughters of Norway was organized in Junction City, OR on October 2, 2011.

Wergeland is honored, together with Elise Wærenskjold, at the Western Norway Emigration Center on the island of Radøy in Vestland county, Norway as one of two Norwegian-American women writers who helped bring the news of life in America to Norwegians.

== Selected works ==
- Modern Danish Literature and its Foremost Representative (1895)
- Ameriká og Andre Digte (1912) Norwegian
- Efterladte Digte (1914) Norwegian
- History of the Working Classes in France (1916)
- Leaders in Norway and Other Essays (1916)
- Slavery in Germanic Society During the Middle Ages (1916)

== Primary Source ==
- Michelet, Maren (1916) Glimpses from Agnes Mathilde Wergeland's life (Kessinger Publishing Company. 2004. translation of Glimt fra Agnes Mathilde Wergelands liv)
- Løken, Lise B. (1995) Dr. Agnes Mathilde Wergeland : historian, poet, and American university professor (University of Oslo)
- Fekjær, Kari-Anne (2007) Three Norwegian immigrant women in their pioneer settlements in the early trans-Mississippi West (University of Oslo)

== Related Reading ==
- Riley, Glenda (1989) The Female Frontier: A Comparative View of Women on the Prairie and the Plains (University Press of Kansas)
- Øverland, Orm (1996) The Western Home: A Literary History of Norwegian America (Norwegian-American Historical Association. Northfield, MN)
- Scanlon, Jennifer and Shaaron Cosner (1996) American Women Historians, 1700s-1990s: A Biographical Dictionary (Greenwood Press. Westport, Conn)
