= Nanna Storjohann =

Norwegian politician (1838–1898)

- Born: 28 August 1838; Bergen, Norway
- Died: 28 May 1898 (aged 59); Kristiania
- Occupation: Priest's wife
- Known for: Proponent for public morals
- Spouse: Johan Storjohann
- Children: Marie Michelet
- Parent: Hans Holmboe
- Relatives: Simon Michelet (son-in-law)

Nanna Storjohann (née Nanna Holmboe; 28 August 1838 – 28 May 1898) was a Norwegian proponent for public morals.

She was born in Bergen to rector Hans Holmboe and Valgjerd Endriette Løberg. She married prison and seamen's priest and headmaster Johan Storjohann in 1862, and was the mother of Marie Michelet. The couple spent four years at the Norwegian seamen's mission station in London from 1868, and thereafter settled in Christiania, Norway. Nanna Storjohann was engaged in social work, such as visiting and follow-up of female prisoners. She is regarded among the pioneer proponents for public morality in Kristiania. She died in Kristiania in 1898. In 1912 the women's dosshouse "Nanna Storjohanns Minde" was established in Kristiania by her successor Ólafia Jóhannsdóttir.
