= Decorah Posten =

Norwegian-language American newspaper

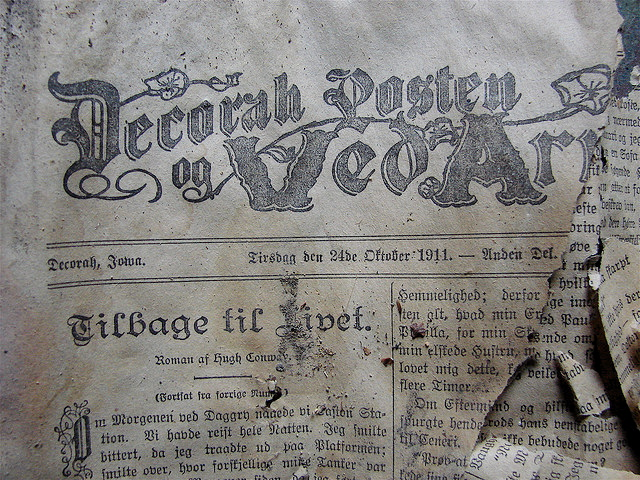
- Front page of Decorah-Posten, 1911
- Founder: Brynild Anundsen
- Founded: 1874
- Ceased publication: 1972 (purchased by The Norwegian American)
- Language: Norwegian
- City: Decorah, Iowa
- Country: United States

Decorah-Posten was a notable Norwegian-language newspaper published in Decorah, Iowa. It was founded in 1874 by Brynild Anundsen, a native of Skien, Norway, and widely read by Scandinavian immigrants in several states.

== History ==
Its origin may be traced to the appearance at La Crosse, Wisconsin, in 1866, of the first Norwegian-American literary magazine, Ved Arnen ("By the Fireside"), which would later become a feuilleton supplement to Decorah-Posten. Anundsen relocated his printing operation to Decorah, Iowa the following year. On September 18, 1874, Anundsen launched Decorah-Posten. It was a well-edited newspaper, its size and familiar format developed gradually. The publisher avoided areas of political and religious controversy, which had destroyed so many earlier papers. Considerable credit has been given to Anundsen for his sound judgment and business sense. He kept abreast of the times in printing and distribution, and expanded the physical plant to meet growing needs.

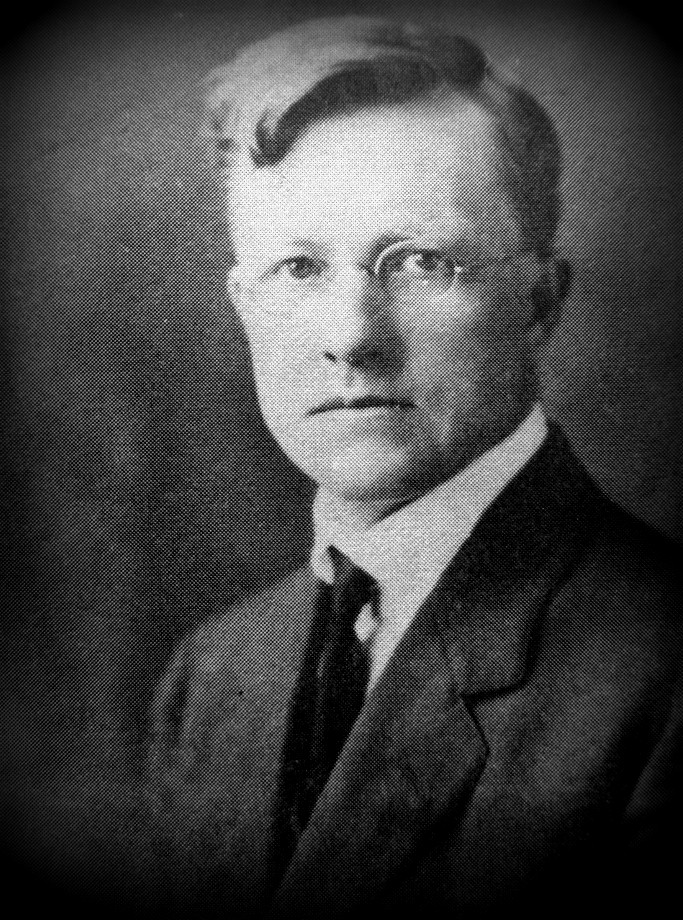
Peter Julius Rosendahl drew the comic strip Han Ola og han Per

A popular feature of the Decorah-Posten was news contributed by Norwegian immigrants and their descendants from many localities in the upper Midwest. The newspaper frequently featured, usually in the Ved Arnen section, Norwegian-language stories and books in serial form, most notably the work of Hans Andersen Foss. The popularity of The Cotter's Son serial in 1899, has been credited with saving the Decorah-Posten from bankruptcy.

The comic strip Han Ola og han Per was introduced in the Decorah-Posten during 1918. Han Ola og han Per was an exclusive feature of the Decorah-Posten. The comic strip was drawn by Peter Julius Rosendahl (1878-1942) from 1918 until 1935. The comic strip was reprinted almost continually until the newspaper ceased publication.

Author and journalist Johannes B. Wist was the editor of Decorah-Posten from 1901 until his death in 1923. During much of this period, he also served as editor of Symra, a Norwegian-language literary magazine which was also published in Decorah, Iowa. Kristian Prestgard served as editor-in-chief of Decorah-Posten from 1923 until his death in 1946. Simon Johnson served as co-editor from 1929 until his retirement in 1945.

To the Posten were incorporated the Minneapolis Tidende in 1935, and the Skandinaven in 1941. By 1948 the Posten claimed to have a larger circulation than all other Norwegian-American newspapers combined. The Decorah-Posten ceased publication in 1972 when it was purchased by Western Viking. Now known as The Norwegian American, this bilingual publication is the continuation of several former Norwegian-language newspapers, including Decorah-Posten, Ved Arnen, Minneapolis-Tidende, Minnesota Posten, Washington Posten, Norrøna and Skandiaben.

It is not known if there is an index to the articles of this newspaper, and, if so, for what time period and where such an index can be found.

== Other source ==
- Lovoll, Odd S. Decorah-Posten: The Story of an Immigrant Newspaper (Norwegian-American Historical Association. Volume 27: Page 77)
- Bailey, Edwin C. Past and Present of Winneshiek County, Iowa. Volume II (S.J. Clarke Publishing Co. Chicago. 1913)
