= The Norwegian American =

American newspaper

The Norwegian American (NA) is a newspaper that publishes material contributed by writers from Norway and the Norwegian-American community. The Norwegian American is distributed on a monthly basis by mail to thousands of subscribers in the US, Canada and other parts of the world. Prior to May 2016, the paper was distributed on a weekly basis and was known as the Norwegian American Weekly.

NA continues what was once a very strong tradition of Norwegian American newspapers, as detailed by Odd Lovoll in his book Norwegian Newspapers in America: Connecting Norway and the New Land. At their height, Norwegian American newspapers had large local circulations and most of their content was in the Norwegian language. As such, Norwegian-language newspapers formed part of what was once an important body of non-English language periodicals.

== Origins ==
The paper was formed in 2006 under the auspices of the Norwegian American Foundation through the merger of regional papers The Western Viking and The Norway Times (Nordisk Tidende). The subscriber base and many of the editorial contributors can be traced to the Viking and Times. The paper's roots also touch back to Decorah Posten; the paper continues to publish the cartoon strip "Han Ola og han Per", the creation of Peter J. Rosendahl originally carried by Decorah Posten.

=== Western Viking ===
The Western Viking was originally founded in 1889 as the Washington Posten by two Norwegian immigrants: Frank Oleson and his brother. Oleson sold the company to the Scandinavian Publishing Company in 1890. During this period, the Posten's editors included Gunnar Lund (1905–1938) and Ole L. Ejde (1938–1959).

In 1959, the Posten was purchased by Henning Boe from the Scandinavian Publishing Company. Boe had immigrated from Norway in 1951. He was trained as a master printer in Norway and planned to return after learning about printing technology in the USA. Instead, he worked for Decorah Posten and later joined Washington Posten in 1954. Under his ownership, the Washington Posten was renamed to Western Viking and the paper introduced more English-language content. Boe also acquired the Decorah Posten, which at the time was the largest Norwegian newspaper in the United States, as well as Ved Arnen, Minneapolis Tidende, Minnesota Posten, Norrøna, and Skandinavian in this period. At 74 years of age, Boe celebrated the centennial of the paper in 1989.

Alf Knudsen, a retired music teacher, bought the paper in 1990, turning the paper over to his daughter, Kathleen Hjørdis Knudsen, in 1997. The Knudsens shifted the paper to include even more English-language content while expressing a desire to keep immigrants connected to "the old country" through articles on current events in Norway.

=== Nordisk Tidende ===
Nordisk Tidende was originally established in 1891 by Emil Nielsen. It focused on gossip, scandal, and murder in the Norwegian-American regions of Brooklyn. The tone of the paper changed to become more serious when its audience grew to include churches, Sons of Norway lodges, etc.

Carl Søyland served as editor-in-chief from 1940 to 1962. In his career he had served as a foreign correspondent writing articles for several papers. He joined Nordisk Tidene in 1926. During the war and the German occupation of Norway, Nordisk Tidene served as an uncensored voice on Norway. The company had more than 40 employees, book-publishing, and its own printing press during this period. The paper spread to a larger audience throughout the U.S. and Canada. The name of the paper in English was Norway Times, and, in 1989, it occasionally ran the English title in larger print above the Norwegian version, always flanking an image of the Statue of Liberty. In 1996, the Norwegian investment company that owned the Norway Times wanted to sell it, but the employees purchased the paper to keep it alive. The paper continued to serve its readers for another decade before it merged with Western Viking.

== Recent period ==
Kathleen Hjørdis Knudsen of the Western Viking continued as editor while the newspaper transitioned to a new look and emphasis. Prominent members of the Norwegian-American community, under the auspices of the Norwegian American Foundation, became its owners and began introducing new elements and emphasis to the paper. Kim Nesselquist, who serves as Consul of Norway in Seattle, was first listed as the publisher of the Norwegian American Weekly in the April 20, 2007, issue. In the August 17 issue, Jake Moe is listed as publisher and editor in chief for the first time, and Kim Nesselquist is titled president. Kathleen Hjørdis Knudsen is listed as editor in this same issue, but does not appear in any of the mastheads of subsequent issues.

Recent editors

- Jake Moe, 2007–2010
- Christy Olsen Field, 2010–2012
- Kelsey Larson, 2012–2014
- Emily Skaftun, 2014–2019
- Lori Ann Reinhall, 2019–2025
- Line Klevmo Beumer, 2025–present

== See also ==
- American Association of Foreign Language Newspapers
- Decorah Posten
- Norwegian Americans
