= Norwegian Sunday School Association =

Norwegian interest organization

Logo.

The Norwegian Sunday School Association (Norwegian: Søndagsskolen Norge) is an interest organization for sunday schools in Norway.

It welcomes Sunday schools affiliated with the Church of Norway, and is thus Evangelical-Lutheran in scope but with an ecumenical orientation. The association was founded in 1889, and currently has about 1,200 member schools. Chair of the board is Siri Lindtveit, secretary general is Gøran Byberg, and the organizational headquarters are in Oslo. Its slogan and vision is "Jesus to the children".
