= Nordisk Tidende =

Norwegian language newspaper in the United States

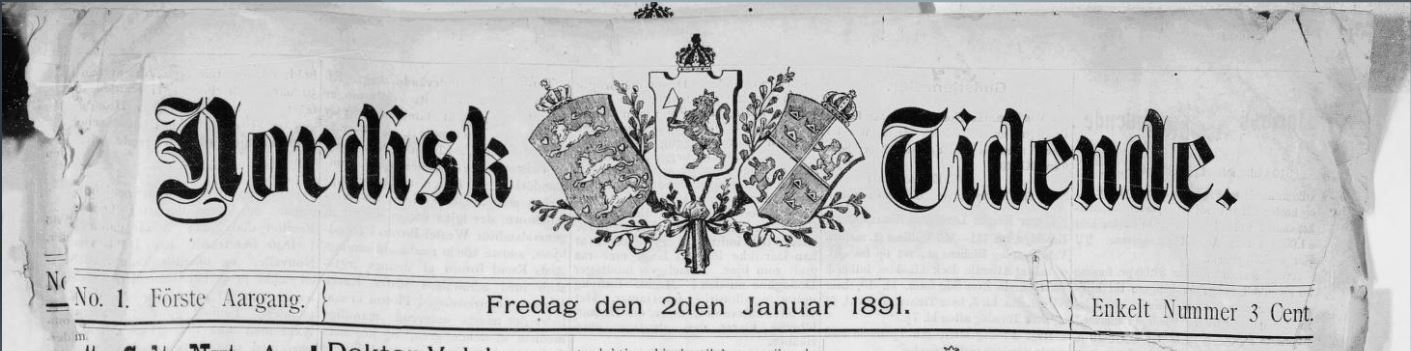
Nameplate of Nordisk Tidende

Nordisk Tidende was a Norwegian language newspaper in the United States founded in 1891 and closed in 1983. In 1996, the Norwegian investment company that owned the Norway Times wanted to sell it, but the employees purchased the paper to keep it alive. The paper continued to serve its readers for another decade before it merged with Western Viking and the resulting publication became The Norwegian American in 2006. Some also report a daughter publication that opened in 1993 known as the Nordic Journal.

The newspaper was founded by Emil Nilsen, an immigrant who came to the United States in 1887 to seek his fortune. As a previous book printer and sense of newspaper operations, it was natural that he started a newspaper for Norwegians in their new homeland. He saw that there was a need for Norwegians in the New York area to receive news from "the Old Country" written in Norwegian and decided to start Nordisk Tidende. Its first edition released 3 January 1891.

In order to capture readers' interest, Nilsen filled his newspaper with drug rumors, scandals and popular gossip. His successors imposed a higher standard and more professional journalism, and the newspaper evolved into a respected publication that could offer their readers cultural fabric and news from two continents.

In 1930, Brooklyn had 63,000 residents of Norwegian descent. The newspaper was their main source of news from Norway, but World War II heightened the importance of the newspaper to its readership.

Nordisk Tidende was the only free Norwegian newspaper published during World War II and the only uncensored newspaper with the latest news from occupied Norway. Among the newspaper's writers at the time were Nobel Prize winner Sigrid Undset.

As time passed and the first and second generation Norwegians died out, there was less need for a Norwegian language newspaper. The newspaper changed its name in 1991 to Norway Times and became an English-language weekly newspaper.

Nordisk Tidende had several editors over the years. Carl Søyland, among others, joined the newspaper in 1930 and was its editor from 1940 to 1963.

Norway Times' current editor is from Stavanger, Lene Heimlund Larsen.

== Literature ==
- Roedder, Karsten: Av en utvandreravis' saga : Nordisk Tidende i New York gjennom 75 år. 2 bind. New York, 1966, 1968
- Søyland, Carl: Skrift i sand : bruddstykker av utvandrer-sagaen Gyldendal, 1954
- Thor Gotaas & Roger Kvarsvik: "Ørkenen Sur : den norske uteliggerkolonien i Brooklyn". Oslo 2010
