= Henny Dons =

Norwegian educator and missionary (1874–1966)

Henrike Margrethe "Henny" Dons (25 May 1874 – 14 June 1966) was a Norwegian educator and inner missionary.

She was born at Aker in Øvre Eiker as a daughter of hospital manager Johannes Albrecht Dons (1839–1921) and Johanne Marie Fleischer (1850–1943). She was a sister of aviator Hans Fleischer Dons. The family moved to Kristiania in 1883.

She finished middle school at Nissen Girls School in 1891, worked some years as a private teacher for the Bugge family in Rosendal and graduated from Asker Teachers' Seminary in 1897. She worked as a primary school teacher in Bærum until 1900, then in Kristiania from 1900 to 1917. She was also a leading figure in YWCA already from her early twenties. She had undergone a Christian awakening while living in Rosendal, and was in 1897 selected as a teacher for a Norwegian Missionary Society program in colonial South Africa, but she was prevented by illness.

From 1917 to 1939 she served as the national secretary of children's work in the Norwegian Missionary Society. During her tenure, the number of local missionary associations for children rose from about 300 to 1,100. In the Norwegian YMCA-YWCA Association she served as deputy chair from 1905 to 1917 and 1932 to 1941.

She was also a co-founder of the Women Teachers' Missionary Association in 1902 (chair 1905 to 1946), the Missionary Workers' Ring in 1907, the Norwegian Christian Teachers' Association in 1909 (now a part of KPF) and the Norwegian Missionary Studies Council in 1911. In 1910 both the Women Teachers' Missionary Association and the Missionary Workers' Ring became member bodies of the Norwegian National Women's Council, and Dons was a board member here from 1910 to 1916. Together with people like Bolette Gjør, in 1904 she proposed successfully that women be granted voting rights within the Norwegian Missionary Society. She also headed a campaign in 1911, together with five other women, to grant women the right of speech in churches of Norway. She contributed to the magazine Norges Kvinder and edited the magazines Missionshilsen, Vort blad and Misjonsselskapets barneblad. She also penned several books.

Dons was awarded the King's Medal of Merit in gold in 1962, and was proclaimed an honorary member of the Norwegian National Women's Council in 1965. She did not marry. She died in June 1966 in Oslo.
