= Orm Øverland =

Norwegian literary historian (1935–2021)

Orm Harald Øverland (17 May 1935 – 1 December 2021) was a Norwegian literary historian.

He was born in Oslo and grew up in that city as well as in Bryne, Montreal, and Aukra. He graduated with the cand.philol. degree from the University of Oslo in 1962, and was employed as a research assistant for one year. He then became a research fellow and took his PhD at Yale University in 1969. He was subsequently hired at the University of Bergen as a docent in 1970 and was promoted to professor in 1975, serving until his retirement in 2005. His fields of research were American literature and the Norwegian-Americans.

At the University of Bergen, Øverland headed the Institute of English Studies from 1974 to 1975 before serving as dean of the Faculty of Humanities from 1979 to 1982. During his period as dean he also sat on the university board (then called the Academic college), which he did again from 1987 to 1989, before heading the Institute of English Studies again in 1991 and 1993–1995. He was engaged in administering the international exchange of postgraduate students to and from the United States, Canada and Lithuania in particular.

He has been a board member of the Western Norway Emigration Center, the European Association for American Studies, the Coimbra Group, president of the Nordic Association for American Studies and editor of the journal American Studies in Scandinavia. Øverland became a member of the Norwegian Academy of Science and Letters in 1994, received the King's Medal of Merit in gold in 2003 and was given an honorary degree at the Vytautas Magnus University in 2007.

He resided for many years at Nygård, Bergen, but died in December 2021 in Aukra.
