= Western Norway Emigration Center =

Open-air museum in Norway

Coordinates: 60°41′04″N 5°03′05″E

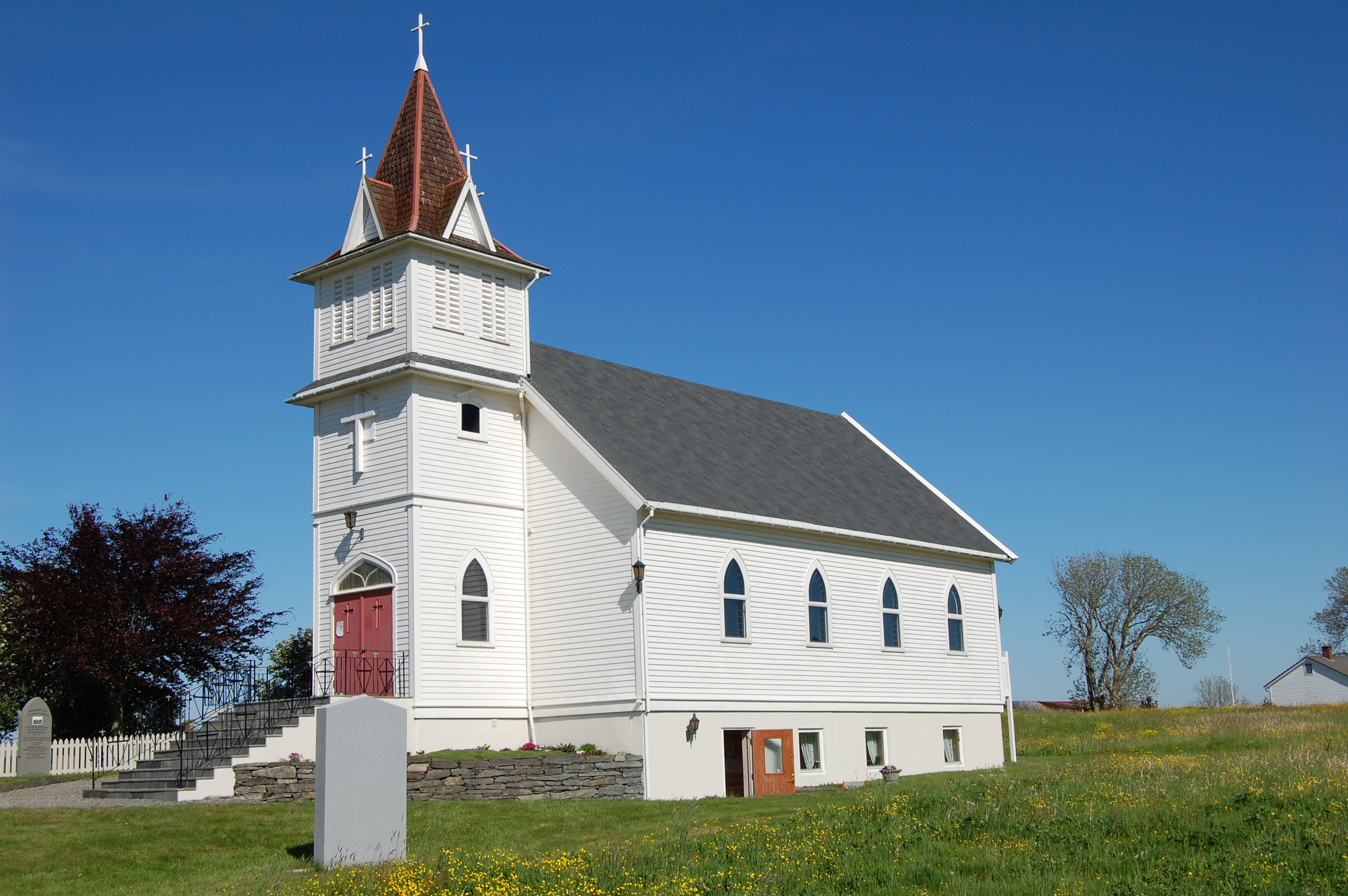
Brampton Lutheran Church

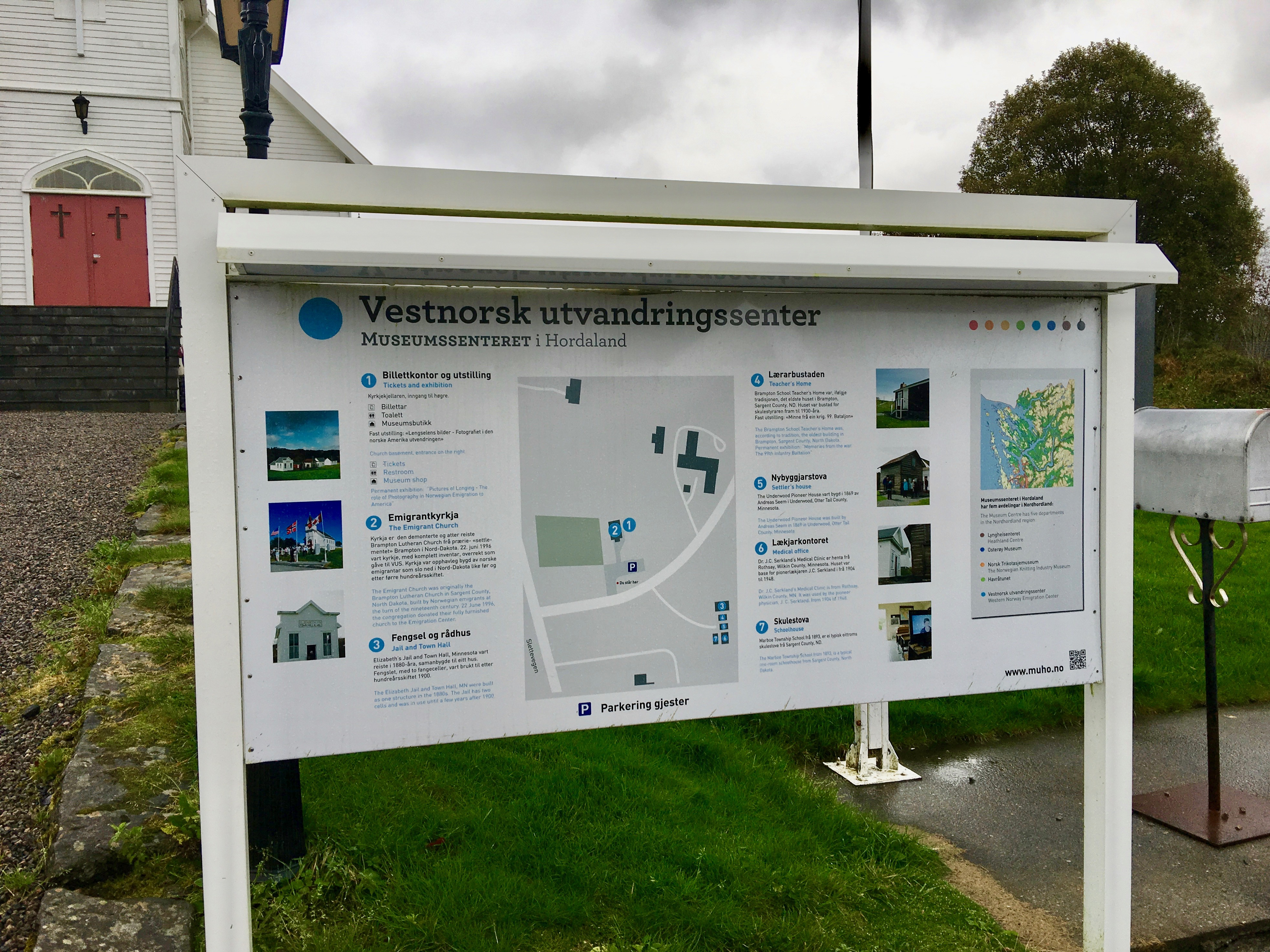
Information board

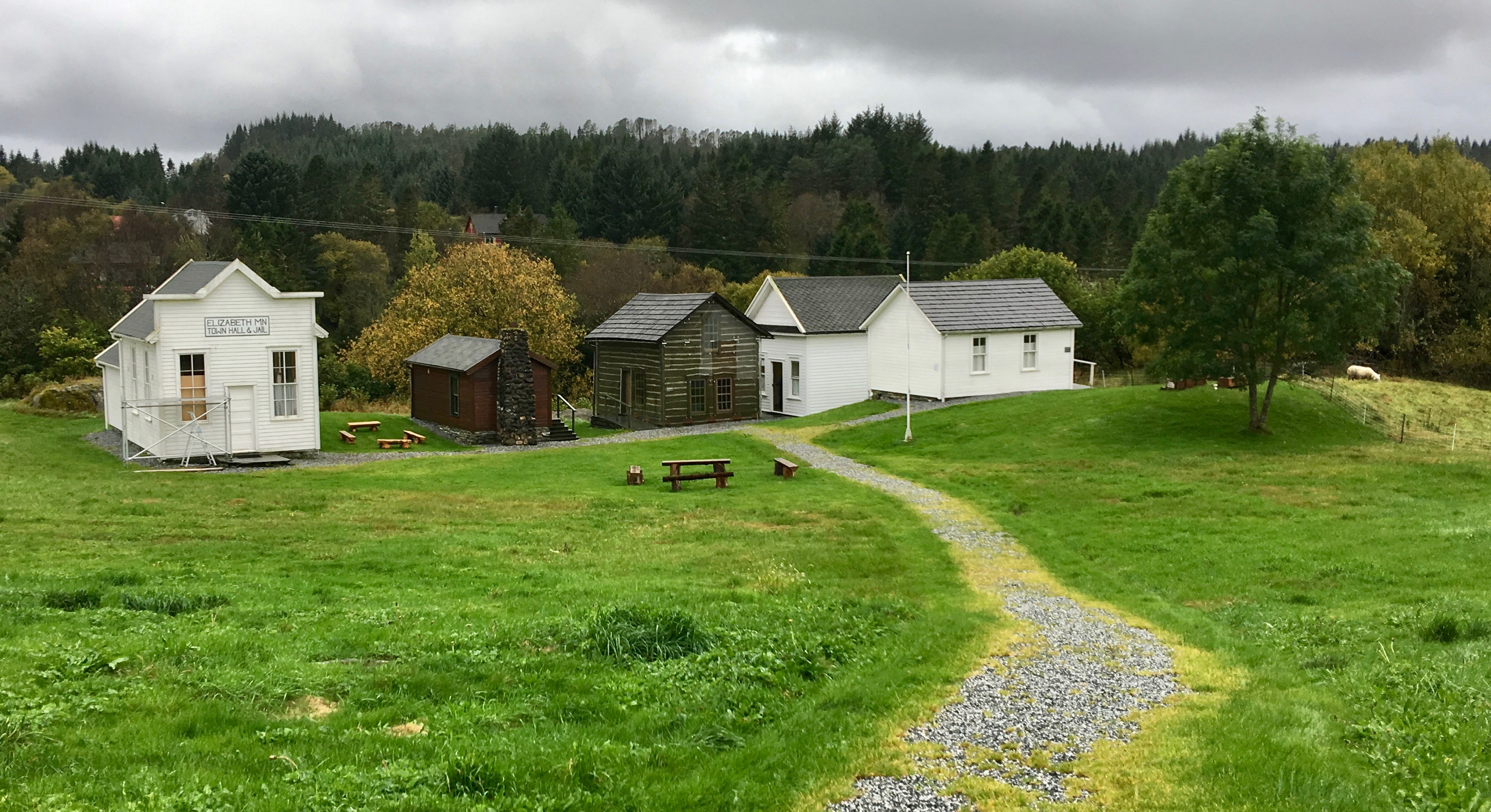
Other historical buildings

Western Norway Emigration Center (Norwegian: Vestnorsk utvandrarsenter or Vestnorsk utvandringssenter) is an open-air museum at the village of Sletta on the island of Radøy in Alver Municipality, Vestland county, Norway. The museum opened in 1997 and comprises five houses and a church built by Norwegian emigrants in the United States, later dismantled and moved to Radøy.

== Museum Centre in Hordaland ==
Western Norway Emigration Center is operated in cooperation with the Museum Centre in Hordaland (Museumssenteret i Hordaland) which focusing on the preservation of the social and cultural history of the Hordaland area of Vestland county. King Harald and Queen Sonja have honored the museum with a visit. Western Norway Emigration Center is the site of several activities throughout the year including weddings, meetings, concerts, and festivals. There are guided tours around the center. There is also a library with books about Norwegian emigration to North America.

=== Brampton Lutheran Church ===
In 1996, Brampton Lutheran Church was dismantled and moved from Brampton Township, Sargent County, North Dakota. The entire church, with all inventory, was given as a gift to the Western Norwegian Emigration Center. Volunteers, both Norwegian and American, dismantled the church for transport to Sletta, where it was re-assembled. Brampton Lutheran Church was subsequently consecrated by Ole Hagesæther, Bishop of the Diocese of Bjørgvin (1994–2008) and officially reopened as the Emigrant Church (Emigrantkirka på Sletta).

=== Marboe Township School ===
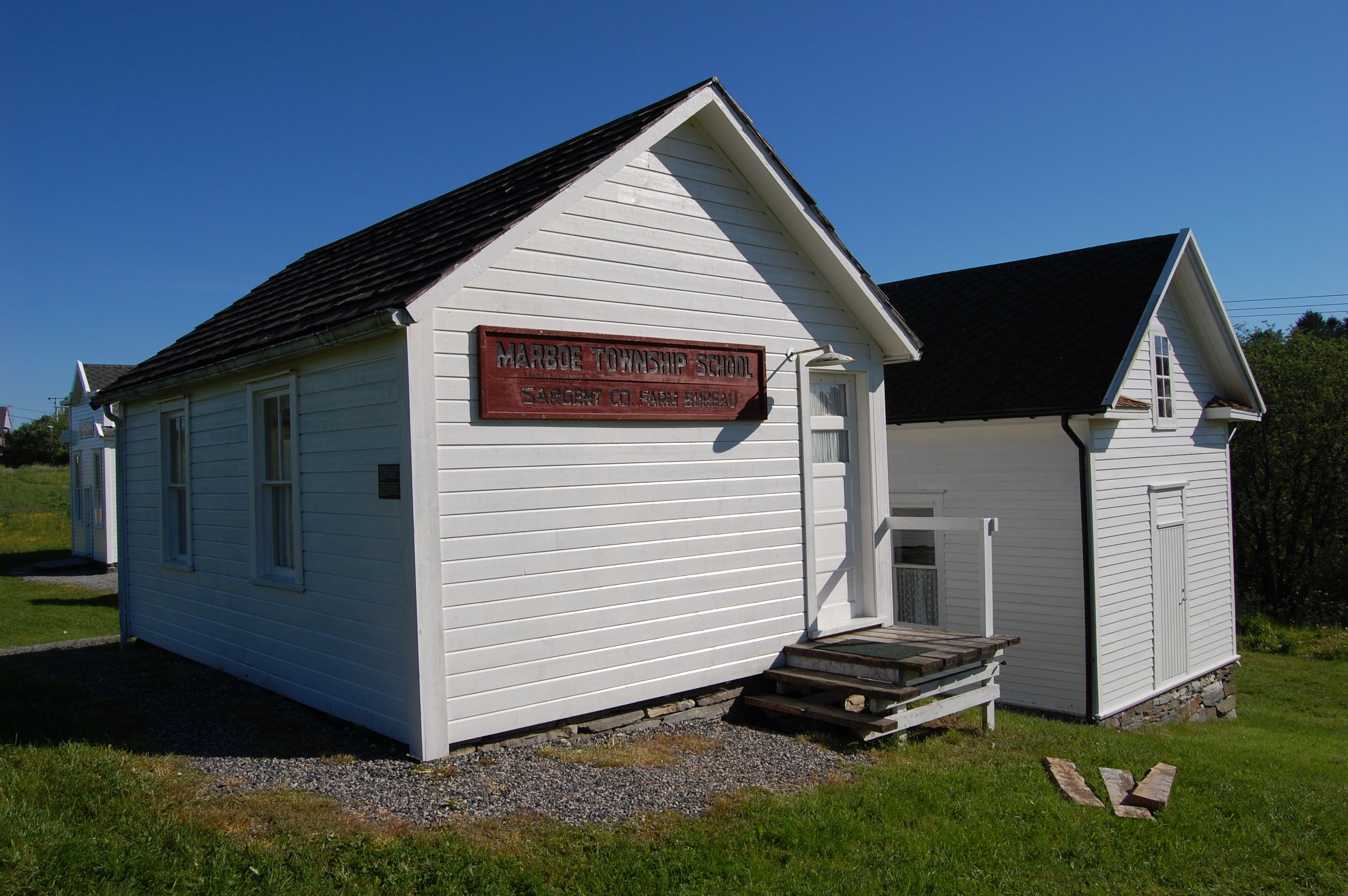
Marboe Township School

Dating from 1893, this is a typical one room school from Sargent County, North Dakota. It was moved to Forman, North Dakota, near Brampton, in the 1960s where it was used as a museum. In 1997, Sargent County Farm Bureau donated the school to the Western Norwegian Emigration Center. It opened on July 8, 2000.

=== Dr. J.C. Serkland Medical Office ===
This building was taken from Rothsay in Wilkin County, Minnesota. It was the office of Doctor John Christian Serkland (1872- 1948) during more than 50 years of medical practice. His grandchildren purchased the house and donated it to the Western Norwegian Emigration Center. It was officially opened on July 8, 2000.

=== Underwood Pioneer House ===
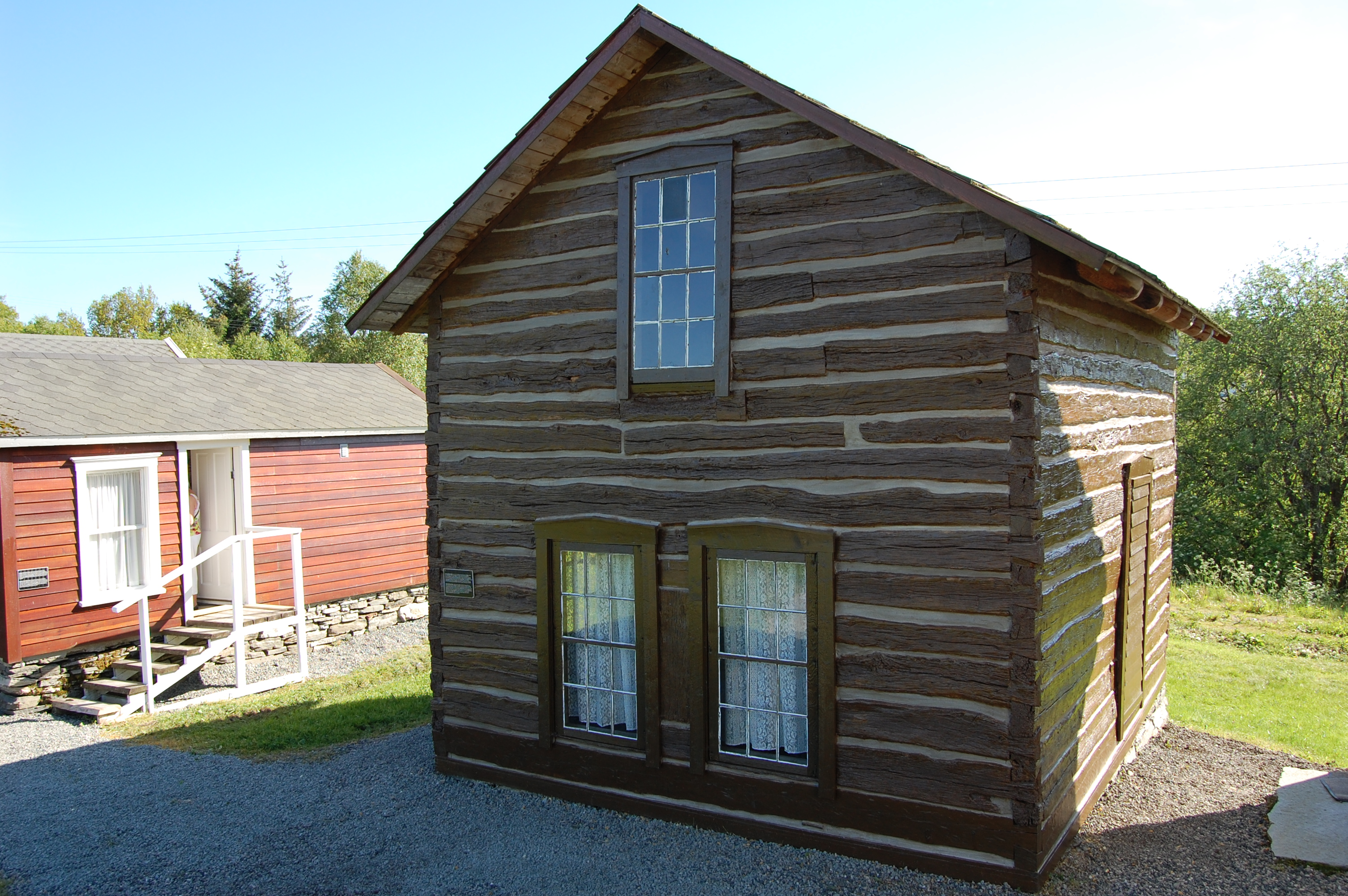
Underwood Pioneer House

The Underwood Pioneer House was the home of Andreas Seem (1820-1890), an immigrant from Nord-Trøndelag, Norway. The house was originally built following his arrival during 1869 in Underwood in Otter Tail County, Minnesota. Luverne Kiene, the great grandchild of Karen and Andreas Seem, donated the house to the Western Norwegian Emigration Center in 1997. It was officially opened on July 8, 2000.

=== Brampton School Teacher's Home ===
This was apparently the oldest house in Brampton township. The year of construction is unknown, but the fireplace construction indicates that it is probably as old as the European settling of North Dakota. It housed the principal of the school until the 1930s. Sanford and Genevieve Cooper donated the house to the Western Norway Emigration Center in 1997. The house was officially opened on July 8, 2000.

=== Elizabeth Township Jail and Town Hall ===
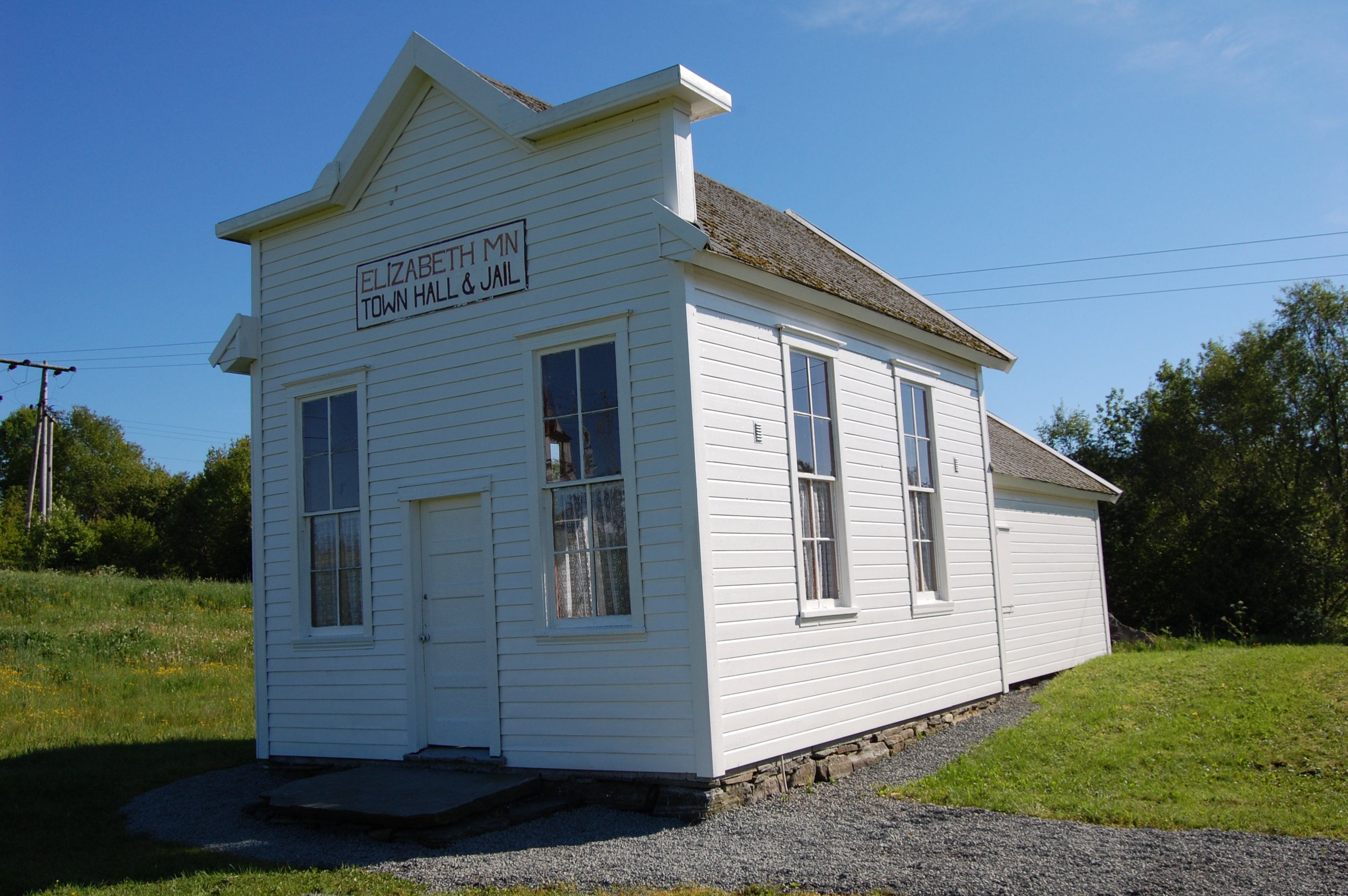
Elizabeth Town Hall and Jail

Elizabeth Township Jail and Town Hall were built in the 1880s and incorporated to one building. The jail with two cells was used until slightly after 1900. The Town Council of Elizabeth, Minnesota, donated the building to the Western Norwegian Emigration Center during the spring 2000. It was officially opened on July 6, 2002.

== Asbjørn Ystebø ==
Asbjørn Odd Ystebø was a teacher at Danielsen Videregående Skole, an independent Christian high school in Bergen, Norway who had an important role in the exchange agreement between his high school and Hillcrest Lutheran Academy in Fergus Falls, Minnesota. During a visit in the United States in 1992-93, Ystebø got the idea of establishing a Norwegian American center in his home village of Sletta. Rural townships in Minnesota and North Dakota had in many cases experienced dramatic population decreases. As a result, there were historic building available for relocation. Asbjørn Odd Ystebø would later receive the St. Olav's Medal based upon his engagement in Norwegian and American relations.

== Gallery of Memorial Stones ==
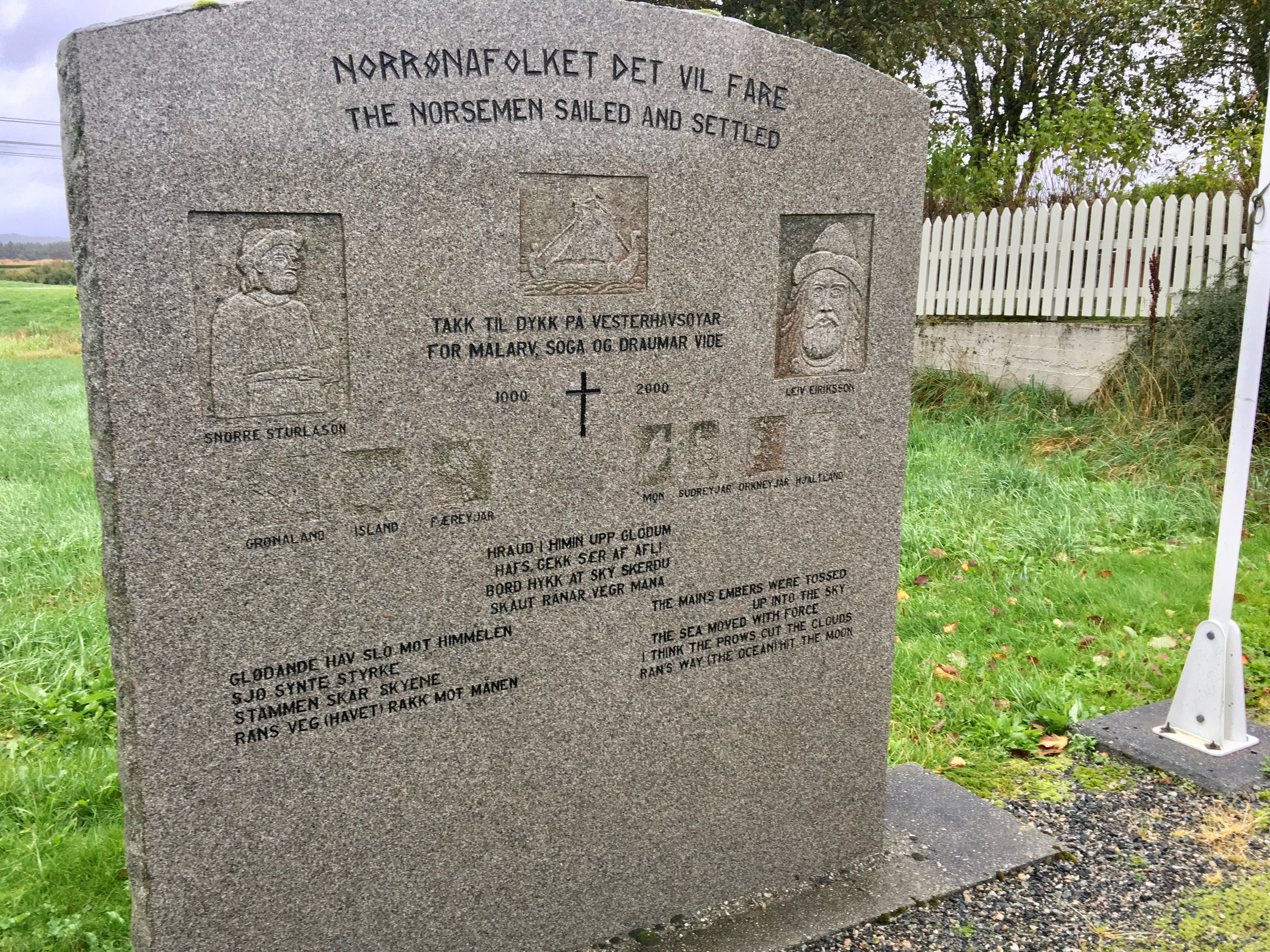
Memorial stone honoring Norsemen who sailed and settled

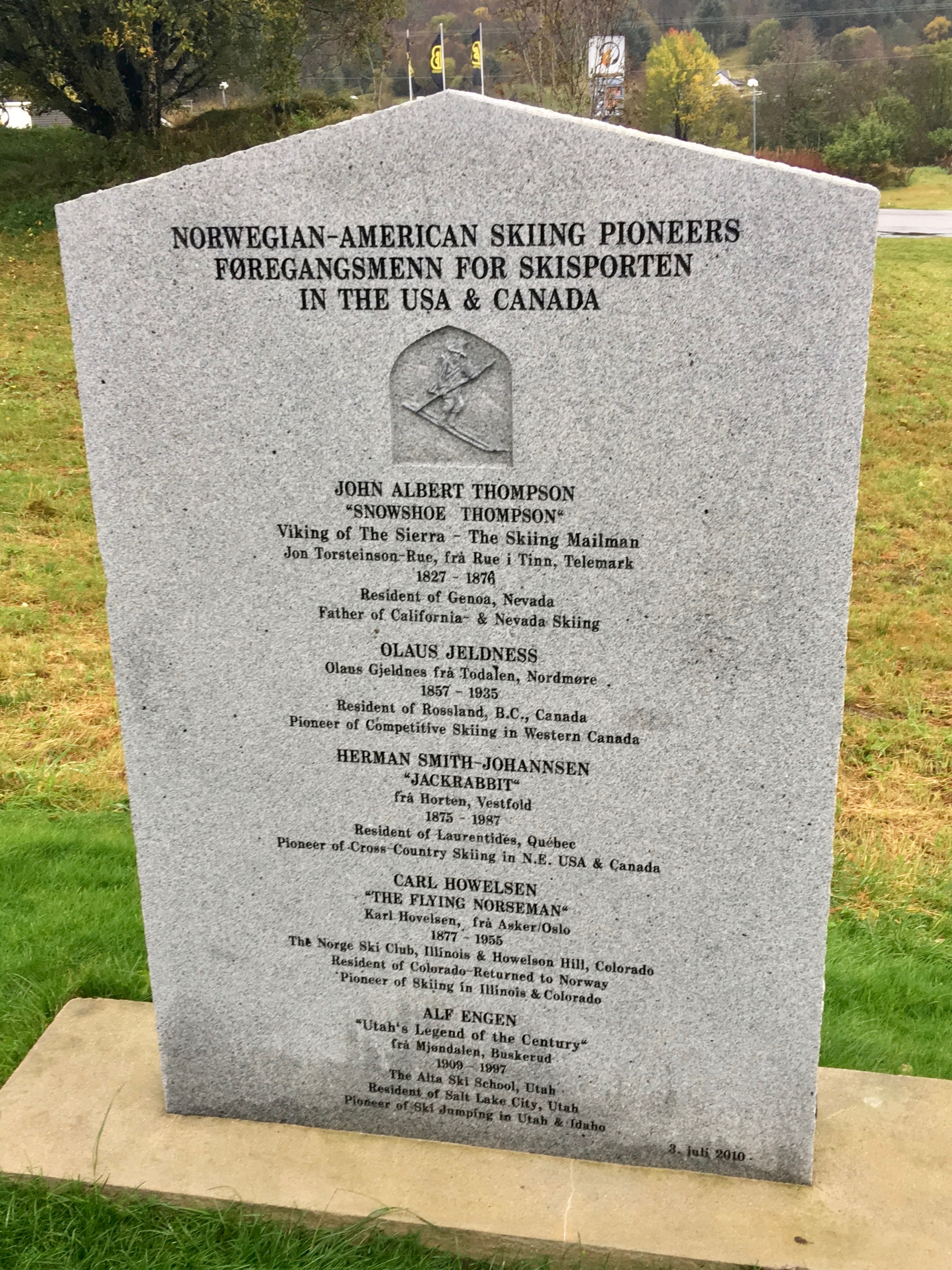
Memorial stone honoring Norwegian-American skiing pioneers

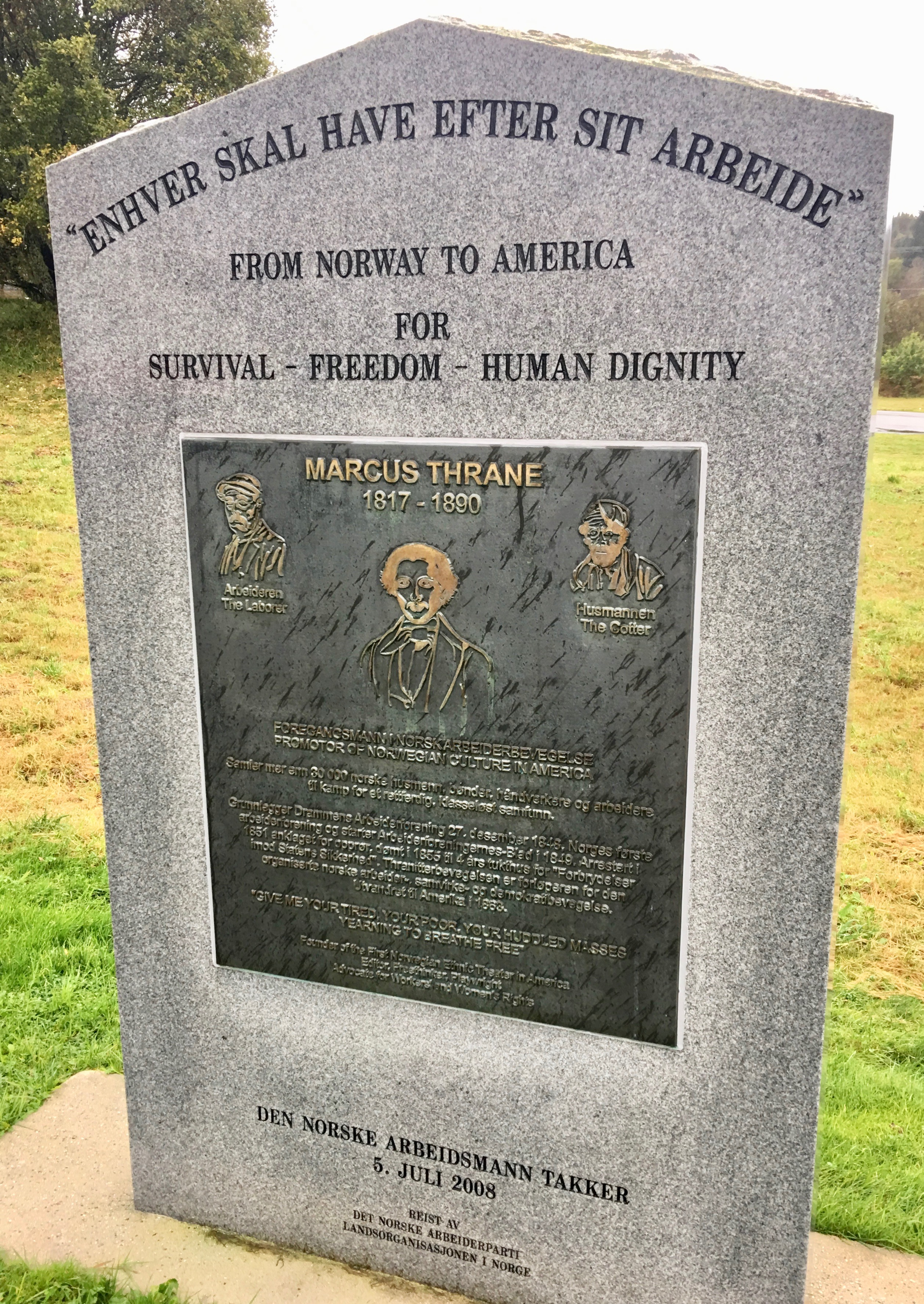
Memorial stone honoring Marcus Thrane

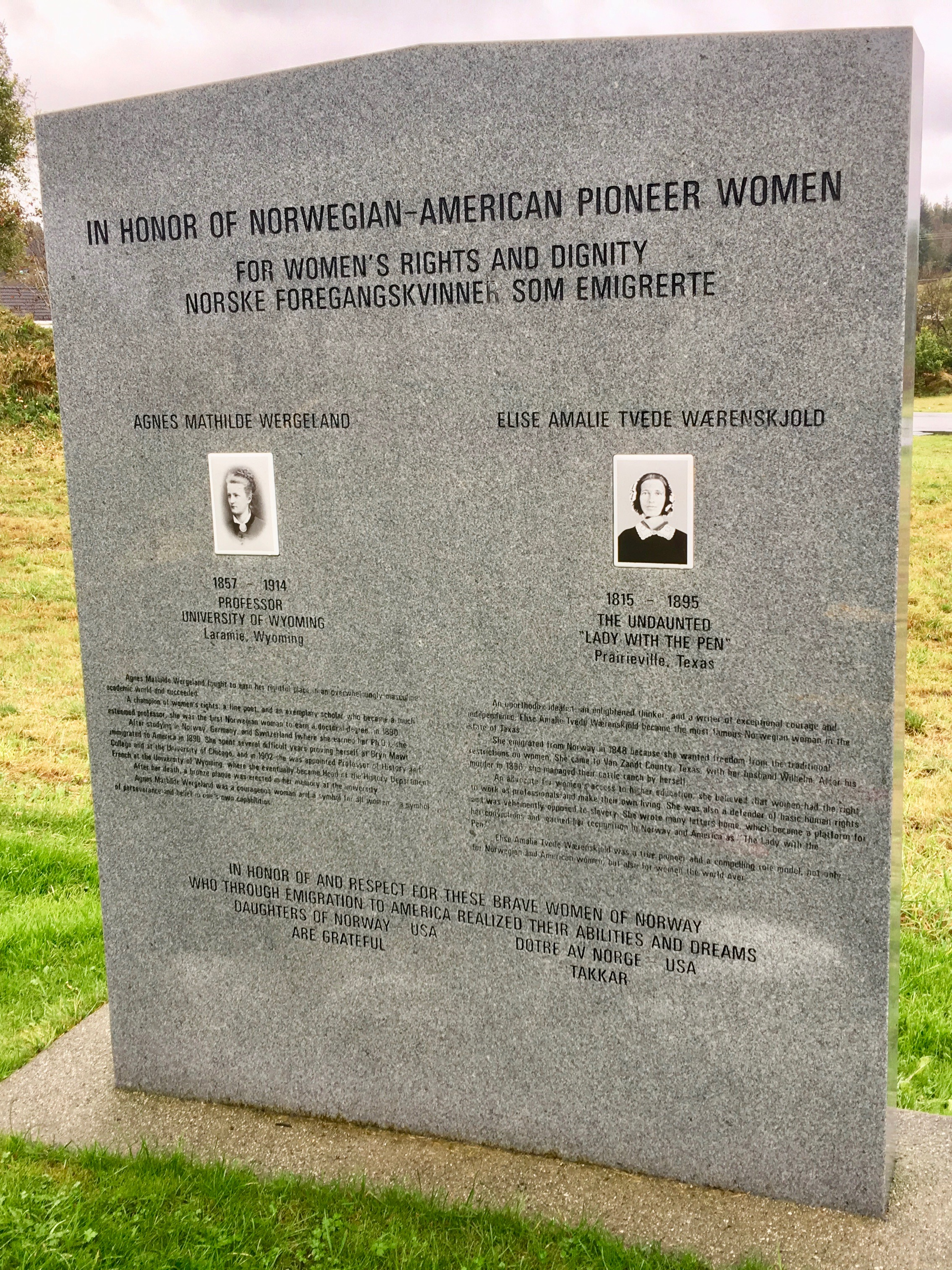
Memorial stone honoring Agnes Mathilde Wergeland & Elise Wærenskjold

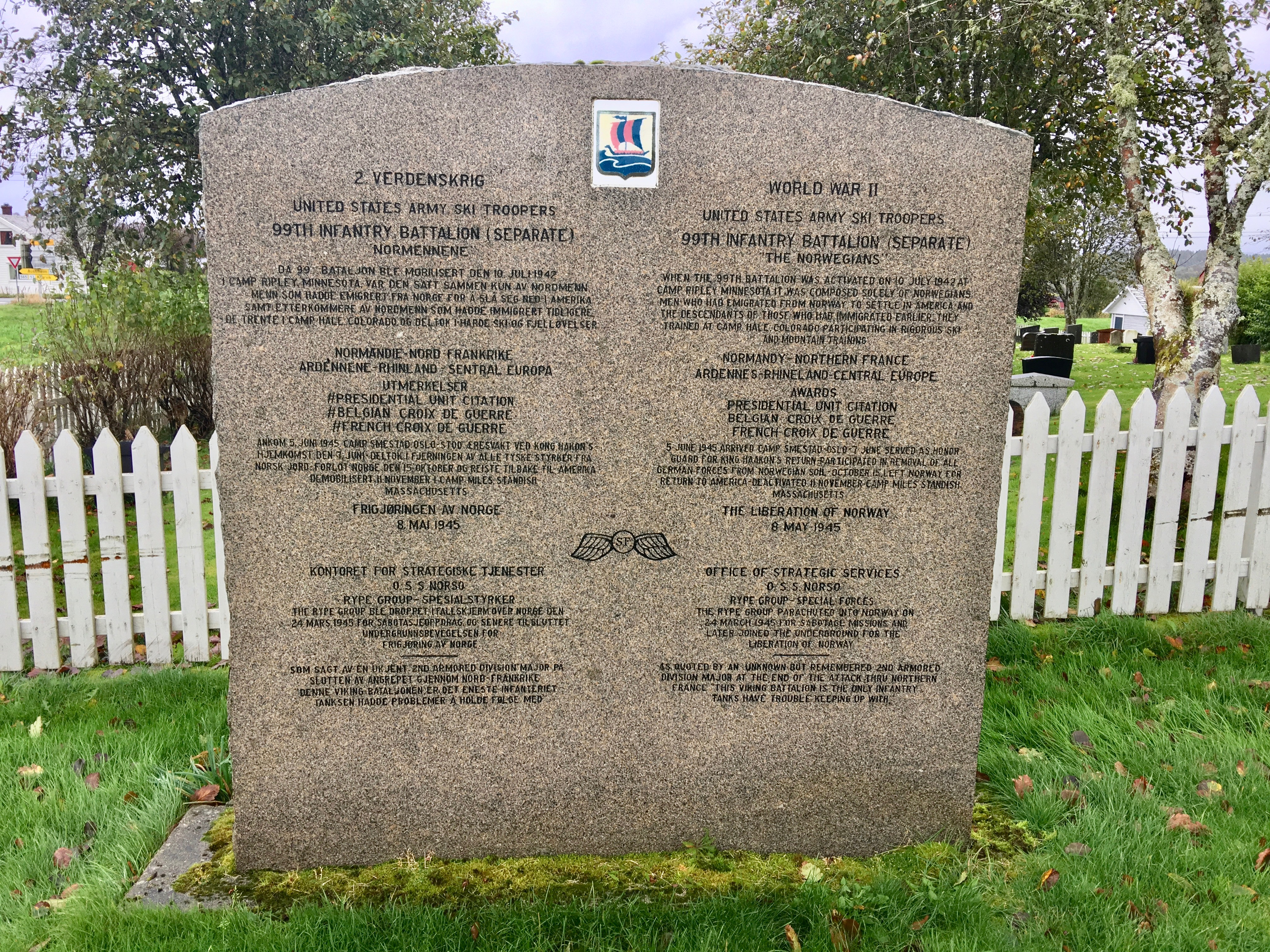
Memorial stone honoring U.S. Army Ski Troopers of the 99th Infantry Battalion
