= Maren Michelet =

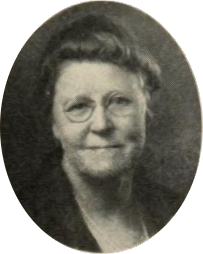
- from History of the Norwegian people in America
- Born: Maren Bastine Hals Michelet; May 26, 1869; Minneapolis, Minnesota
- Died: February 5, 1932 (aged 62)
- Known for: first Norwegian teacher in any US public high school
- Title: Education Secretary of the Society for the Advancement of Scandinavian Study

Academic work
- Notable works: First Year Norse, Glimpses from Agnes Mathilde Wergeland's life

Maren Bastine Hals Michelet (May 26, 1869 – February 5, 1932) was the first Norwegian teacher in any public high school in the United States and promoter of Scandinavian culture. She was also a referent teacher for Scandinavian languages when the three-language education system (of the land, of the immigrant homes, for professional purposes) was introduced in public school in the United States.

== Life ==
Maren Bastine Hals Michelet was born on May 26, 1869 to Nils Christian Michelet (1838–1920), a former deputy collector of customs and attorney in Minneapolis, and Johanne Hals (1836–1920). The Michelet family moved to Minneapolis from Menomonie, Wisconsin. Maren had three brothers, Simon Themstrup (b. 1871), secretary to Senator Knute Nelson, Wilhelm Ludvig Christian (1873–1946), and Ove Hals Jean (b. 1865). She lived with her parents at 1807 S 4th St, Minneapolis, and attended the University of Minnesota.

== Career ==
Maren Michelet was a teacher of Scandinavian languages in Minneapolis, Minnesota, and indeed she was the first Norwegian teacher in any public high school in the United States. During the years 1906–1910 Dr. J. N. Lenker began to campaign for a three-language education—of the land, of the immigrant homes, for professional purposes. Michelet's Scandinavian heritage was essential to her role as a teacher when the Minneapolis School Board decided to include Northern languages in the ordinary curriculum.

In 1917 Michelet produced her survey: of 168 high schools contacted in Scandinavian, 73 replied. 43 schools, in 7 states, were teaching in Norwegian to 1,380 students, and 20 schools in 3 states were teaching in Swedish to 918 students.

She was also a strong promoter of Scandinavian culture. In 1917 she was nominated officer of the Society for the Advancement of Scandinavian Study. In 1923 she was elected Education Secretary.

The main center for Norwegian studies in High School in 1925 was Minneapolis. Michelet was one of the four referent teachers. In 1925 Michelet was decorated by Haakon VII of Norway.

== Works ==
In 1914, Maren Michelet published First Year Norse, a high school textbook for grammar of Norwegian language.

In 1916, Michelet published Glimpses from Agnes Mathilde Wergeland's life, a translation of Glimt fra Agnes Mathilde Wergelands liv, the biography of Agnes Wergeland, Norwegian-American historian, poet and educator and the first woman to earn a doctorate in Norway.

She also did surveys on schools, prepared course studies, and edited a version of Henrik Ibsen's Terje viken.

== Death ==
Maren Michelet died on February 5, 1932. She is buried at Lakewood Cemetery, Minneapolis, Plot: Section 5 Lot 405 Grave 8.
