= Johan Storjohann =

Norwegian priest, educator and writer

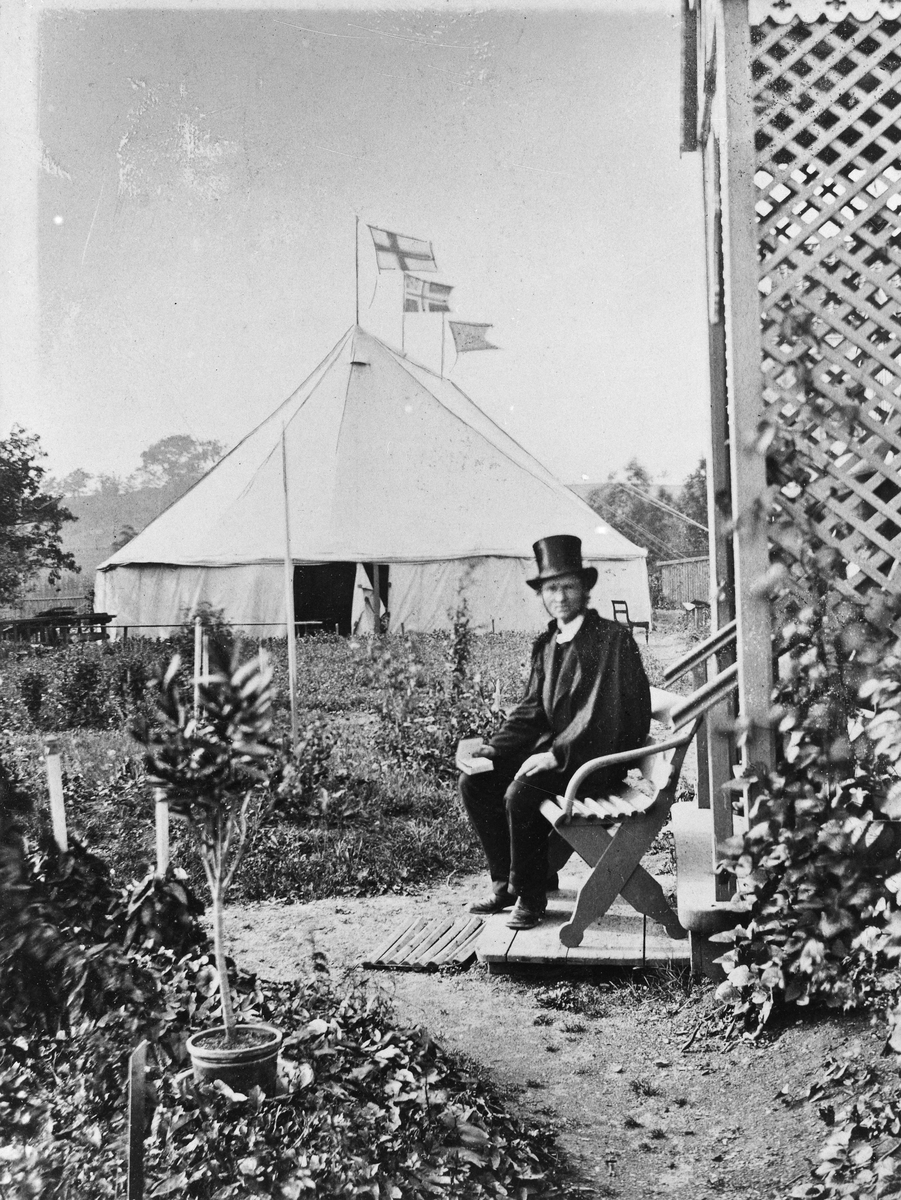
- Johan Storjohann (c.1875/1880) outside his missionary tent at Sagene, Christiania
- Born: 15 August 1832; Bergen, Norway
- Died: 23 April 1914 (aged 81)
- Education: cand.theol.
- Alma mater: Royal Frederick University
- Occupation(s): Priest; Educator; Non-fiction writer
- Children: Marie Michelet
- Relatives: Hans Holmboe (father-in-law); Simon Michelet (son-in-law)
- Awards: Order of St. Olav

Johan Storjohann (15 August 1832 – 23 April 1914) was a Norwegian priest, educator and non-fiction writer. He is most associated with the establishment of the Norwegian Seamen’s Mission (Sjømannskirken).

== Biography ==
Storjohann was born in Bergen, Norway. He was married to Nanna Holmboe (1838–1898), daughter of Hans Holmboe. He was the father of Marie Michelet, and father-in-law of Simon Michelet.

He graduated as cand.theol. from the University of Christiania in 1860. In 1864, he laid the foundation for the establishment in Bergen of what became known as the Norwegian Seamen’s Mission. Between 1868 and 1872, he served as priest for Norwegian sailors in London. Between 1873 and 1880, he served secretary of the Inner mission (indremisjon) in Christiania (now Oslo). In 1880, he established Hauges Minde in Christiania, a school to educate Lutheran mission priests.

Among his books are Tre Fortællinger from 1876, and Kong David. Hans Liv og hans Psalmer (two volumes, 1889–1895). He was decorated as Knight, First Class of the Order of St. Olav in 1871.

His influence led the Swedish Evangelical Mission to start its own seamen's mission in 1869.
