= Christian Fredrik Michelet (politician) =

Norwegian politician (1863–1927)

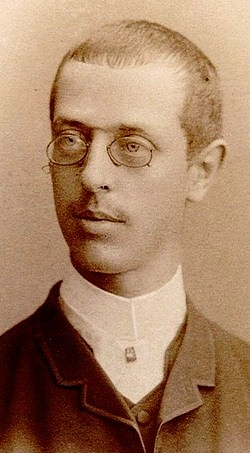
- Michelet, c. 1885

Minister of Foreign Affairs
- In office 6 March 1923 – 25 July 1924
- Prime Minister: Otto B. Halvorsen; Abraham Berge
- Preceded by: Johan Mowinckel
- Succeeded by: Johan Mowinckel
- In office 21 June 1920 – 22 June 1921
- Prime Minister: Otto B. Halvorsen
- Preceded by: Nils Claus Ihlen
- Succeeded by: Arnold Ræstad

Prime Minister of Norway Acting
- In office 24 March 1923 – 30 May 1923
- Preceded by: Otto B. Halvorsen
- Succeeded by: Abraham Berge

Personal details
- Born: 23 June 1863 Christiania, United Kingdoms of Sweden and Norway
- Died: 25 July 1927 (aged 64) Bærum, Norway
- Party: Conservative
- Occupation: Politician, lawyer

Christian Fredrik Michelet (23 June 1863 – 25 July 1927) was a Norwegian lawyer and politician for the Conservative Party.

He was born on 23 June 1863, in Oslo, a son of Colonel Georg Ove von Ramel Michelet (1830–1908) and Anna Beate Stang (1838–1866). He was a paternal grandson of Christian Fredrik Michelet (1792–1874) and a maternal grandson of Thomas Andersen Stang. He was a nephew of Carl Johan Michelet, first cousin of Major Christian Fredrik Michelet and second cousin of theologian Simon Michelet. In May 1888, he married Betzy Holmsen (1867–1951).

He finished his secondary education at Aars og Voss in 1881, and graduated with the cand.jur. degree in 1886. After graduation, he was a deputy judge and junior solicitor for Nils Nicolaysen, before opening his own lawyer's firm Michelet og Harbitz together with Edmund Harbitz in 1890. From 1892, he was a barrister with access to Supreme Court cases. In 1916, the firm changed its name to Michelet, Skavlan og Blom.

Michelet moved to the property Birkeli at Fornebu in 1894. He was elected to Bærum municipal council in 1897, and served as mayor from 1899 to 1910. He was an elector in the 1900 election. He was elected to the Parliament of Norway from the constituency Bærum og Follo in 1909, and was re-elected in 1912, 1915 and 1918. From 1920 to 1921, when the Bahr Halvorsen's First Cabinet held office, Michelet was Minister of Foreign Affairs. He later became Minister of Foreign Affairs again in Bahr Halvorsen's Second Cabinet (1923) and Berge's Cabinet (1923–1924). After Prime Minister Otto Bahr Halvorsen died, Michelet also served as acting Prime Minister of Norway from 24 March to 29 May 1923. In 1926–1927 he was tried in the impeachment case against seven members of Berge's Cabinet, but was acquitted.

He was a board member of Forsikringsselskapet Norden (1913–1927), Den norske Creditbank (1907–1918, chairman since 1912), Elektrisk Bureau and Tofte Cellulosefabrik.

Michelet was decorated as a Commander, First Class of the Order of St. Olav (1921), Commander of the Order of the Dannebrog, Knight of the Order of Vasa and the Order of the Polar Star. He died in 1927 from an accidental shot from his own gun. His wife married B. Johan R. Koren.

Political offices
Preceded by Carl Herman Halvorsen	Mayor of Bærum; 1899–1910	Succeeded by Olaf Bryn
Preceded by Nils Claus Ihlen	Norwegian Minister of Foreign Affairs; 1920–1921	Succeeded by Arnold Ræstad
Preceded by Johan Ludwig Mowinckel	Norwegian Minister of Foreign Affairs; 1923–1924	Succeeded by Johan Ludwig Mowinckel
