= Christian Fredrik Michelet (businessman) =

Christian Fredrik Michelet (1 August 1891 – 1962) was a Norwegian military officer and businessperson.

He was born in Kristiania. He finished his secondary education in 1909 and graduated from the Norwegian Military College in 1915. He became a Premier Lieutenant in 1912, a Captain in 1918, and a Major in 1934. He also had engineer education from the French École nationale supérieure de l'aéronautique et de Construction mecanique from 1917 to 1919. After graduating there, he worked for Hærens Flyvemaskinfabrik for one year and Elektrisk Bureau for three years.

He was hired as a secretary in Norsk Celluloseforening and Den norske Træmasseforening in 1926. He served as managing director of the former organization (later renamed Cellulosefabrikkenes Felleskontor) from 1939 to 1961. He was a supervisory council member of Forsikringsaktieselskabet Norden and Saugbrugsforeningen and a deputy board member of Tofte Cellulosefabrik. He was named in official Norwegian trade and negotiation delegations.

He was decorated as a Chevalier of the Legion d'honneur. He died in 1962.
