= Christian Frederik Michelet =

Norwegian military officer (1792–1874)

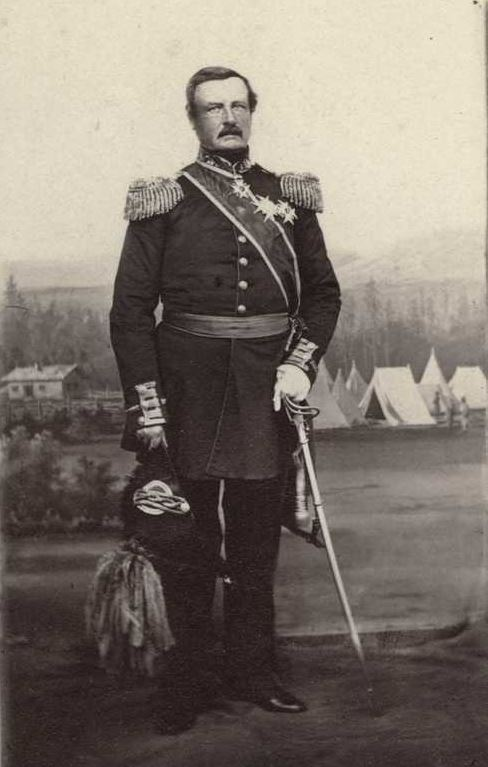
Frederik, c. 1860

Christian Frederik Michelet (7 December 1792 – 13 May 1874) was a Norwegian military officer.

He was born in the village of Moland in the Moland prestegjeld as a son of vicar Johan Wilhelm Michelet (1753–1805) and Sophie Amalie Tuchsen. He was named after his paternal grandfather. He was a great-grandson of Hans Michelet and nephew of Jørgen Michelet. In December 1821, in Eidsberg he married Edle Michaeline Rasch (1804–1892). He was the father of Carl Johan Michelet and grandfather of politician Christian Fredrik Michelet and major Christian Fredrik Michelet.

He attended Cadet Academy in Copenhagen until 1810. He was stationed in Denmark with the rank of second lieutenant, but was transferred to the province Norway in 1811. He was promoted to second lieutenant in 1812. His first war was the Swedish campaign against Norway in 1814. His battalion was not particularly successful, but Michelet survived. Norway achieved independence from Denmark in the same year.

He was promoted to captain in October 1825. From April 1834, he led the Ullensaker Company of the Romerike Light Infantry Corps. He lived in Blaker and served as mayor of the municipality in 1838 and 1839. Via the position as leader of the Nes Company; in 1840 he became leader of the Frøland Company and in 1846 leader of Fredriksten Musketeer Corps. He led the 2nd Akershus Infantry Brigade from 1851 and the 1st Akershus Infantry Brigade from February 1854. From March 1854 to April 1868, he was the Commander of Fredriksten Fortress. He was successively promoted to lieutenant colonel in 1846, colonel in 1851 and major general in 1854.

Michelet nearly participated in the First Schleswig War in 1848. Norway sent a field corps of 700 men in the direction of Denmark to aid. Michelet led this corps, but it was halted after reaching Scania. The corps returned home without seeing action.

Michelet died on 13 May 1874, aged 81, at Asak near Halden.

Military offices
Preceded by Hans Glad Bloch	Commander of Fredriksten Fortress; 1854–1868	Succeeded by Johan Georg Boll Gram
