= Carl Johan Michelet =

Norwegian politician (1826–1902)

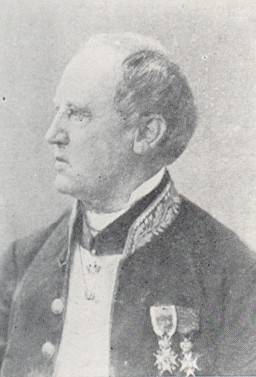
Michelet wearing the Grand Cross of St.Olav

Carl Johan Michelet (25 July 1826 - 30 January 1902) was a Norwegian lawyer and civil servant. He served as Mayor of Oslo and was elected as a member of the Norwegian Parliament (Storting).

== Biography ==
He was born at Blaker in Aurskog in Akershus county, Norway. His parents were Christian Frederik Michelet (1792-1874) and Edle Michaeline (1804-1892). His father was a Major General in the Norwegian military. He attended the University of Christiania and took the Norwegian bar exam in 1849. He was an associate for seven years until he became permitted to practice law (overrettssakførar) in Christiania (now Oslo).

He was a police chief of Christiania from 1863 to 1870 and was a member of the Royal Commission of the Police in 1864. Michelet was elected to the Christiania city council in 1862 and was appointed mayor during the period 1866–1868. He was a member of the city council until 1882.

He was also elected to the Norwegian Parliament as a representative of Jarlsberg og Larvik County (Jarlsberg og Larviks amt) from 1886 to 1891, then again from 1895 to 1901.

== Personal life ==
Michelet was married in 1853 to Olava Emilie Mathea Buhring (1826-1879) with whom he had three children. They were the parents of Christian Fredrik Michelet (1860–1935) who was an equestrian and military officer. After her death, he was married in 1882 with Johanne Bruun (1840-1887). Michelet was awarded a number of honours, including the Grand Cross of the Order of St. Olav in 1901. He died in Christiania.

== Other Sources ==
- Finne-Grønn, S.H. (1919). Slegten Michelet: genealogisk-personalhistoriske meddelelser, med vaabentegninger, facsimiler og portrætter (in Norwegian). Kristiania, Norge.
- Lindstøl, Tallak (1914). Stortinget og Statsraadet 1814-1914 (in Norwegian). Kristiania, Norge.
- Johnsen, Oscar Albert (1945–48). Sem og Slagen. En bygdebok (in Norwegian). Tønsberg, Norge. Archived from the original on 15 February 2012.

Government offices
Preceded by Johan Christian Georg Hvoslef	County Governor of Jarlsberg og Larvik amt 1882–1902	Succeeded by Thomas von Westen Engelhart
