= Klingenberg =

Klingenberg may refer to:

== Places ==
- Klingenberg am Main, a town in Bavaria, Germany
- Klingenberg, Saxony, a municipality in Saxony, Germany
- Klingenberg, a village in Elverum Municipality, Norway
- The German name for Zvíkov Castle, Czech Republic

== People ==
- Alf Klingenberg (1867–1944), Norwegian pianist
- Fritz Klingenberg (1912–1945), German Waffen-SS officer
- Johannes Benedictus Klingenberg (1817–1882), Norwegian military officer and engineer
- Meghan Klingenberg (born 1988), American soccer/association-football player
- Odd Sverressøn Klingenberg (1871–1944), Mayor of Trondheim, Norway 1911–1916
- Olaf Sverressøn Klingenberg (1886–1968), Norwegian politician
- Sverre Sverressøn Klingenberg (1882–1958), Norwegian engineer and politician
- Wilhelm Klingenberg (1924–2010), German mathematician
- Sigríður Klingenberg (1967), Icelandic astrologer
