= Rita Ottervik =

Norwegian politician (born 1966)

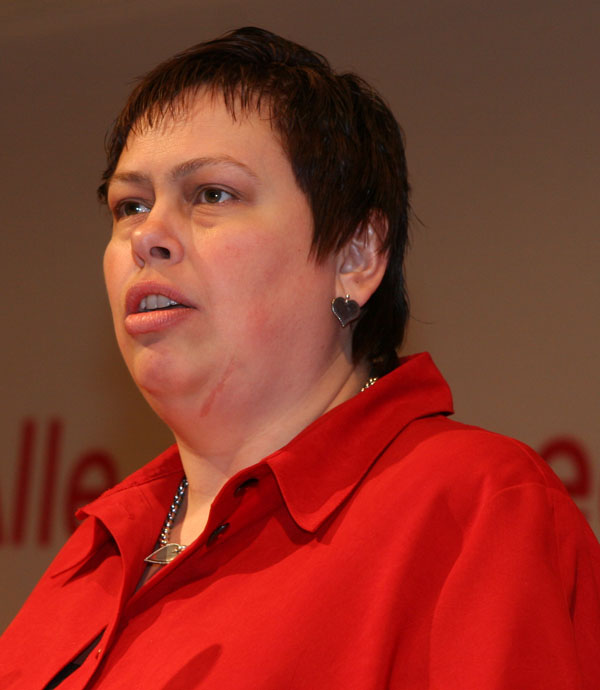
- Ottervik in 2007.

Mayor of Trondheim
- In office 9 October 2003 – 26 October 2023
- Deputy: Knut Fagerbakke; Hilde Opoku; Ola Lund Renolen; Mona Berger
- Preceded by: Anne Kathrine Slungård
- Succeeded by: Kent Ranum

Personal details
- Born: Rita Irene Ottervik; 11 September 1966 (age 58); Hitra Municipality, Sør-Trøndelag, Norway
- Political party: Labour
- Spouse: Tore Nordseth (m. 2002)

Rita Irene Ottervik (born 11 September 1966 in Hitra Municipality) is a Norwegian politician from the Labour Party who served as the mayor of Trondheim from 2003 to 2023.

== Political career ==
=== Early career ===
She has served as a secretary in the Workers' Youth League and political advisor at the Office of the Prime Minister under Thorbjørn Jagland (1996–1997). She was elected as a member the municipal council of Trondheim Municipality in 1999, and sat for four years before becoming mayor.

=== Government consideration ===
Ottervik was considered a candidate for a cabinet post following the elections of 2005 and 2009, but she declined the offers on both occasions in favor of continuing her tenure as mayor.

=== Mayor of Trondheim ===
Ottervik became mayor of Trondheim following the 2003 local elections, with the Socialist Left's Knut Fagerbakke as deputy mayor. The duo led Trondheim for the first twelve years of Ottervik's tenure, during which they were re-elected in 2007 and 2011. Fagerbakke retired at the 2015 local election and was replaced by the Green Party's Hilde Opoku. Opoku went on leave in 2017 to assist a humanitarian mission in Ghana and was replaced by Ola Lund Renolen, who held the position until 2019 when Opoku decided to permanently continue her mission in Ghana. Ottervik was re-elected in 2019 with the Socialist Left's Mona Berger as deputy mayor.

In 2022, Ottervik announced that she wouldn't be seeking re-election in the 2023 local elections.

Following the 2023 local elections, she was succeeded by the Conservatives' Kent Ranum.

== Personal life ==
Ottervik is married to fellow Labour Party politician Tore Nordseth.

Party political offices
Preceded by Sigve Brekke	Secretary-general of the Workers' Youth League; 1992–1996	Succeeded by Trond Jensrud
Political offices
Preceded by Anne Kathrine Slungård	Mayor of Trondheim; 2003–2023	Succeeded by Kent Ranum
