= Odd Stub =

Norwegian physician (1896-1964)

Odd Kjeldsberg Stub (10 August 1896 – 14 December 1964) was a Norwegian physician. He was best known as chief physician at Trondheim Hospital and chair of the Norwegian Hospital Association, and specialized in fighting tuberculosis.

== Personal life ==
He was born in Kristiania as a son of district physician John Georg Schlytter Stub (1870–1942) and Arnolda von Westen Sylow Kjeldsberg (1873–1955). On the paternal side he was a great-grandson of Gerhard Heiberg Stub (1781–1831) of Bergen, and thus a grandnephew of Catholic clergyman Johan Daniel Stub. His mother, was half English on the maternal side, and a sister of Francis Kjeldsberg. She was named after Founding Father Arnoldus von Westen Sylow Koren.

In 1923 Odd Stub married his first cousin Harriet Kjeldsberg from Trondhjem, a daughter of Francis Kjeldsberg and granddaughter of Claus Nissen Riiber Berg.

== Career ==
He finished his secondary education in 1914, and graduated from the Royal Frederick University with the cand.med. degree in 1921. He was hired as municipal physician in Stjørdal in 1922 and Bodø in 1923, before working as a reserve physician at Vensmoen Sanatorium from 1924 to 1926 and Rikshospitalet from 1926 to 1934. In 1929 he chaired the Norwegian Students' Society and from 1930 to 1931 he chaired the Norwegian Junior Doctors Association.

From 1934 he was an associate professor at the Institute of Pharmacology, University of Oslo and chief physician at Trondheim Hospital. From 1935 he was also the corporate physician of the insurance company Norske Forenede. In 1942 he was promoted to the position of director of Trondheim Hospital.

He became board member of Nasjonalforeningen mot Tuberkulosen in 1935 and chaired the Trondheim branch. He was deputy chair of Trondheim Kunstforening, chaired the Norwegian Hospital Association and deputy chair of the supervisory council of Trøndelag Teater. He was a fellow of the Royal Norwegian Society of Sciences and Letters and the Royal Society of Medicine.

Odd Stub retired as chief physician in 1961. He died in December 1964 and was buried at Our Lady's Church cemetery in Trondheim.
