= Christian Thaulow =

Norwegian politician

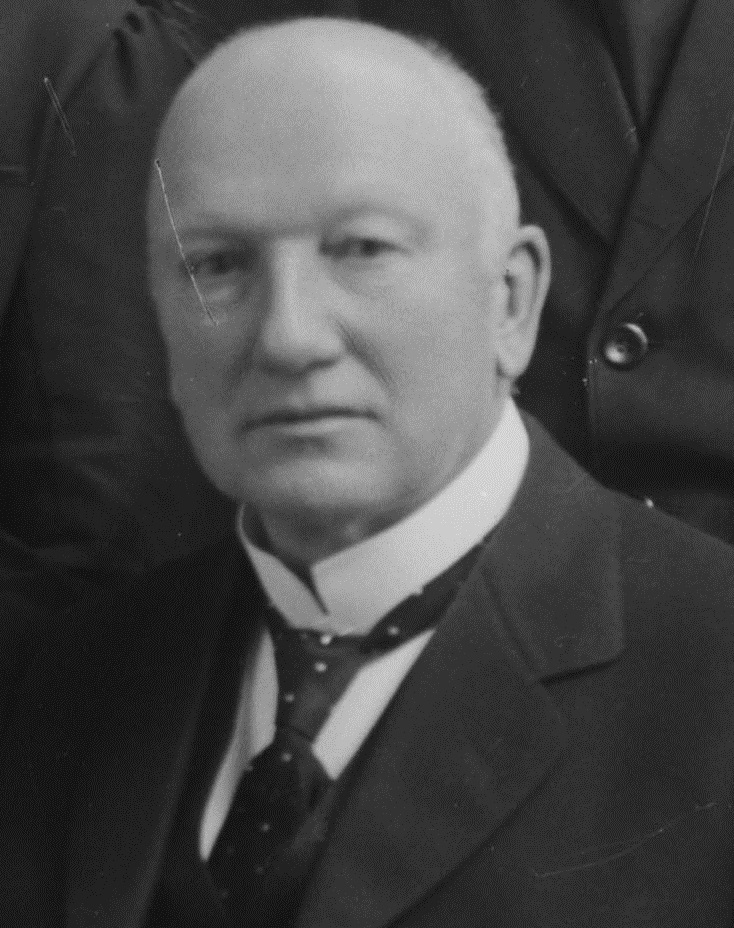

Christian Thaulow (25 March 1864 – 12 September 1930) was a Norwegian merchant and politician for the Conservative Party.

He was born in Trondhjem as a son of merchant and consul Hans Henrik Thaulow and Ulrikke Eleonore Steffens née Jenssen. On his mother's side he was a nephew of Francis Hagerup. He had two aunts who married men that served as MPs; Theodor Gottlieb August Angell and Christian Petersen respectively. Thaulow married Julie Augusta Wefring in 1890, a sister of politician Karl Wilhelm Wefring.

After finishing his secondary education in 1883, he enrolled at the Royal Frederick University and graduated with the cand.jur. degree in 1887. He did not seek a career in law, but settled as a merchant in Trondhjem in 1888 in the family company Chr. Thaulow & Søn. He became the sole proprietor in 1897.

Thaulow was elected to Trondhjem city council in 1897, and subsequently re-elected several times.Thaulow served as mayor of Trondhjem from 1905 to 1907. During his spell as mayor, the coronation of Haakon and Maud of Norway was held in Trondhjem in 1906. Thaulow was a social and fiscal conservative. In national politics, Thaulow was elected as a deputy representative to the Parliament of Norway from Trondhjem og Levanger in 1903, filling in for Otto Kristian Hiorth from late spring 1906. Thaulow assumed a seat in the Standing Committee on Constitutional Affairs and the Lagting. His service in Trondhjem city council ended in 1922.

Thaulow chaired the merchants' association in Trondhjem for several years, becoming an honorary member in 1917. He sat on the supervisory council of the Bank of Norway and Trondhjems Sparebank. He was among those behind the foundation of the commerce school Trondhjems Handelsgymnasium and sat on a supervisory council of the Meråker Line. In 1897 he was a co-founder and board member of Trondhjem historical association, and in 1919 he published an 800-page volume of personal history written by his grandfather, also named Christian Thaulow.

He was decorated as a Knight, First Class of the Order of St. Olav. and a Knight, Second Class of the Order of the Crown of Prussia.

Political offices
Preceded by Hans Jørgen Bauck	Mayor of Trondheim; 1905–1907	Succeeded by Andreas Berg
