= Christian Petersen (politician) =

Norwegian politician

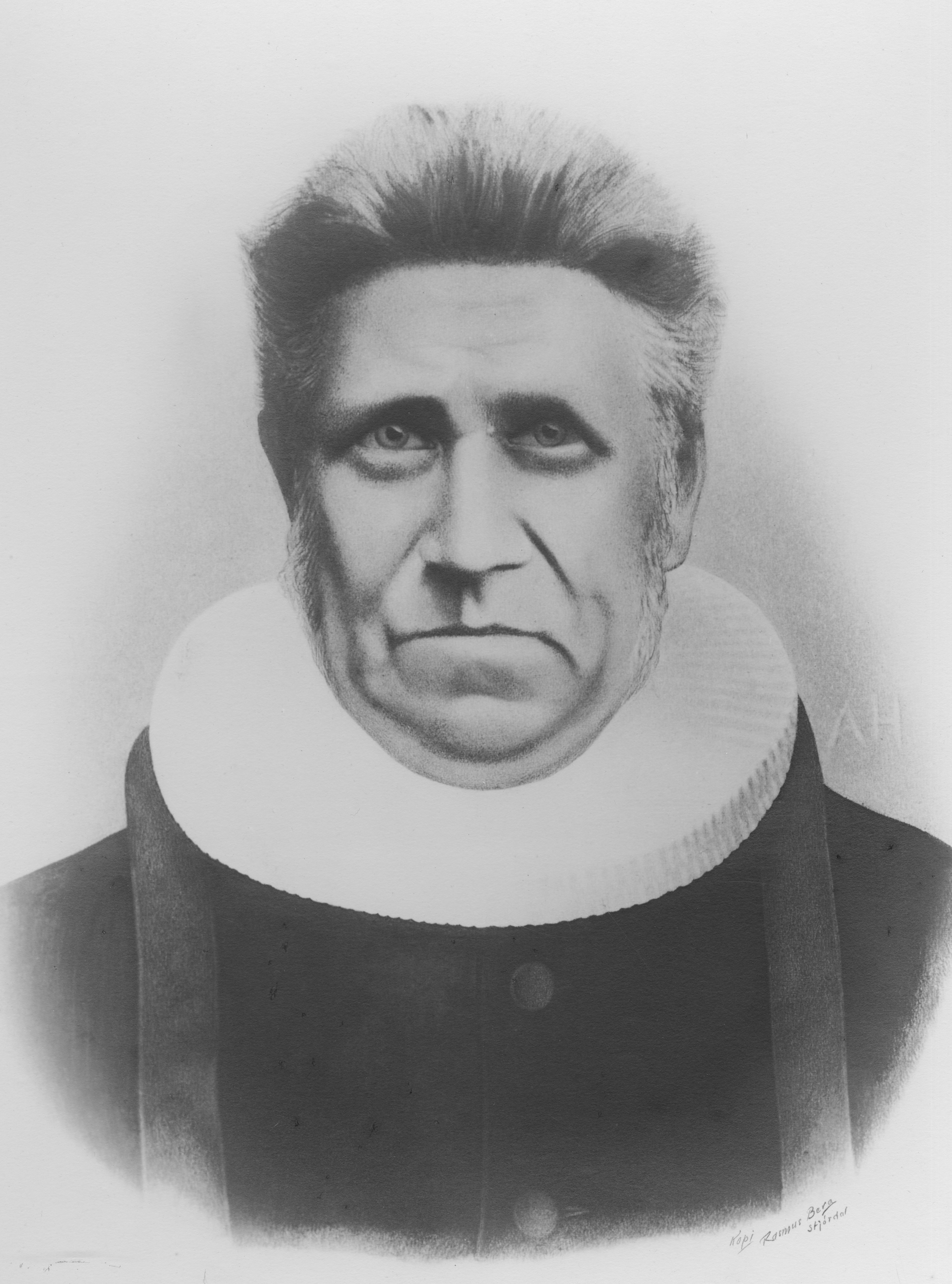
Christian Petersen (1801–1875), parish priest and mayor of Byneset Municipality, later Trondhjem.

Christian Petersen (9 March 1801 – 12 March 1875) was a Norwegian priest and politician.

He was born in Christiania as a son of Andreas Petersen and Marthe Olea née Larsdatter. After finishing his secondary education at Christiania Cathedral School in 1818, he enrolled at the Royal Frederick University and graduated with the cand.theol. degree in 1823.

He worked as a teacher at Christiania Cathedral School until 1826, when he was appointed vicar at Tolgen Church. In 1832 he moved to Bynæsset. After an intermittent stay in Dalerne from 1841, Petersen came to Trondhjem city as a residing chaplain in the Church of Our Lady in 1843, moving to the Nidaros Cathedral in 1849 where he became dean of the Diocese of Nidaros in 1860.

Petersen was elected to the city council for Trondheim Municipality in 1847, serving for several years including a stint as mayor from 1860 to 1862. In national politics, Petersen was elected as a representative to the Parliament of Norway from Sødre Trondhjems Amt in 1838, from Trondhjem og Levanger in 1844 and 1853. In addition, he was elected as a deputy representative in 1847.

He chaired several local organizations, was active in the Norwegian Bible Society and became involved in the Royal Norwegian Society of Sciences and Letters—serving as vice praeces in 1849–54 and praeces in 1855–65. Petersen was decorated as a Knight of the Order of St. Olav. He served in Trondhjem city council until he fell ill in early 1875 and died a couple of months later.

Petersen married Marie Magdalene Thaulow. His wife was an aunt of Christian Thaulow, a later mayor of Trondhjem.

Political offices
Preceded by Hans Georg Colbjørnsen Meldahl	Mayor of Trondheim; 1860	Succeeded by Einar Schavland Gram
Academic offices
Preceded by Hans Jørgen Darre	Praeces of the Royal Norwegian Society of Sciences and Letters; 1855–1865	Succeeded by Andreas Grimelund
