= Johan Cappelen =

Norwegian lawyer and politician

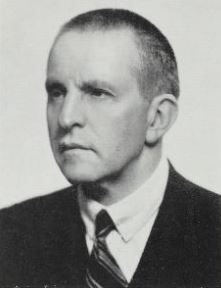

County Governor of Sør-Trøndelag
- In office 16 January 1940 – 18 October 1947; Deposed from 1940–1945.
- Monarch: Haakon VII
- Prime Minister: Johan Nygaardsvold; Einar Gerhardsen
- Preceded by: Odd Klingenberg
- Succeeded by: Ivar Skjånes

Minister of Justice
- In office 25 June 1945 – 5 November 1945
- Prime Minister: Einar Gerhardsen
- Preceded by: Terje Wold
- Succeeded by: O. C. Gundersen

Mayor of Trondheim
- In office 1 January 1931 – 31 December 1934
- Preceded by: Andreas Moe
- Succeeded by: Harald Pedersen

Personal details
- Born: 25 February 1889 Skogn Municipality, Nordre Trondheim, Sweden-Norway
- Died: 18 October 1947 (aged 58) Trondheim Municipality, Sør-Trøndelag, Norway
- Party: Conservative; Free-minded Liberal
- Spouse: Hjørdis Mack Floer
- Children: 5

Johan Cappelen (25 February 1889 – 18 October 1947) was a Norwegian lawyer and politician for the Conservative Party.

He was born in Skogn Municipality as a son of physician Johan Christian Severin Cappelen (1855–1936) and Katharina M. Steen (1859–1915). He had one sister and one brother. He was a nephew of physician Axel Hermansen Cappelen.

He graduated from the Royal Frederick University with cand.jur. degree in 1911. He worked as a deputy judge, and from 1915, attorney in Trondhjem. He was barrister with access to work with Supreme Court from 1922.

As a politician Cappelen was elected to Trondhjem city council, serving as mayor from 1931 to 1934. In 1940 he was appointed County Governor of Sør-Trøndelag. However, due to the German occupation of Norway Cappelen was removed in the autumn of 1940.

In 1942 he joined the "Five Man Committee" in Trøndelag which was going to build the resistance group Sivorg. He was a close contact of Ferdinand Schjelderup in Kretsen. In 1943 he was denounced by Henry Rinnan when the Thingstad Group was discovered. He was arrested in March 1943 and imprisoned in Vollan and Falstad. After falling ill he was transferred to Innherred Hospital, where he managed to continue his resistance work with contacts to Trondheim. However, in March 1945 he was transferred to Grini concentration camp and remained there until the war's end.

When the occupation ended in 1945, Cappelen was appointed Minister of Justice and the Police in the non-partisan coalition government Gerhardsen's First Cabinet. This cabinet lasted from June to November 1945, when a general election was held and the Gerhardsen's Second Cabinet assumed office. Cappelen was then reinstated as County Governor of Sør-Trøndelag, a post he held until his death in 1947.

Political offices
Preceded by Andreas Moe	Mayor of Trondheim; 1931–1934	Succeeded by Harald Pedersen
Preceded by Odd Sverressøn Klingenberg	County Governor of Sør-Trøndelag; 1940–1947 (deposed by Nazis 1940–1945)	Succeeded by Ivar Skjånes
Preceded by Terje Wold	Minister of Justice and the Police; June 1945–November 1945	Succeeded by Oscar Chr. Gundersen
