= Ivar Skjånes =

Norwegian politician (1888–1975)

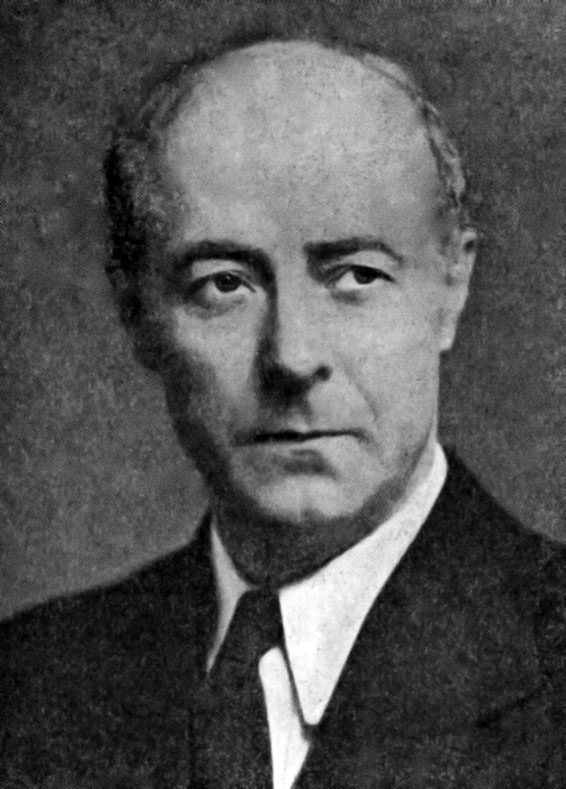
Ivar Skjånes in 1951

Ivar Skjånes (5 March 1888, Kolvereid – 5 June 1975, Trondheim) was a Norwegian politician for the Labour Party.

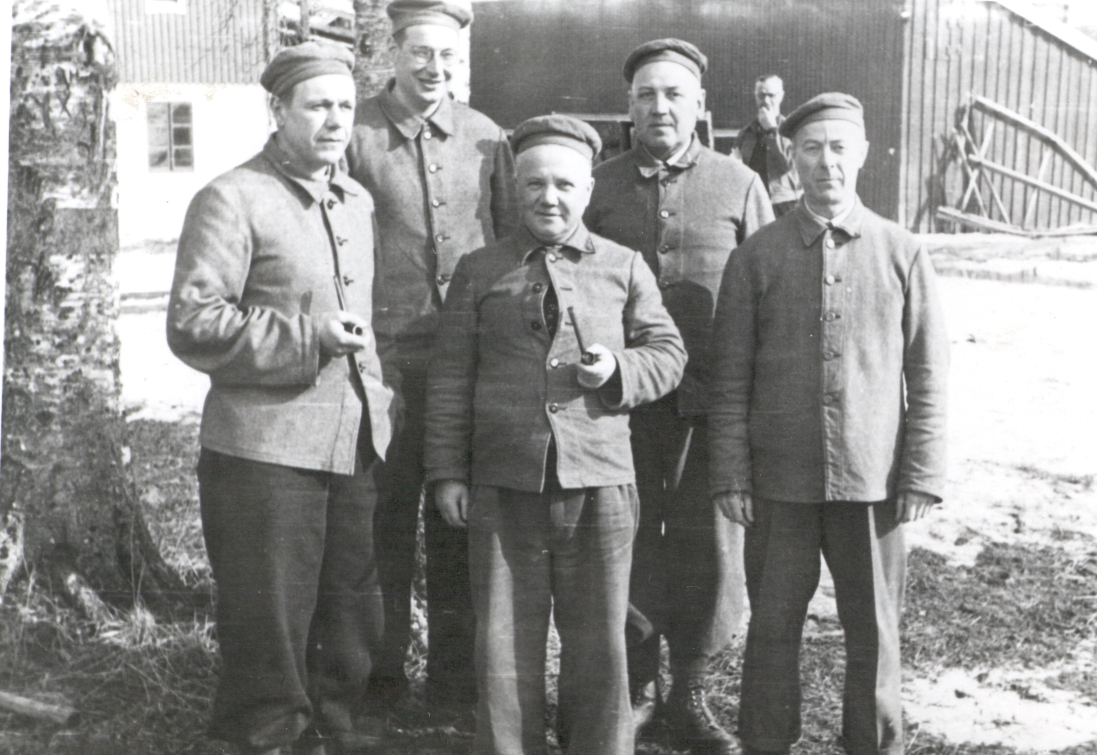
Skjånes (furthest to the right) with a group of fellow prisoners at Falstad in 1942

Skjånes became mayor of Trondheim, the third largest city in Norway, in 1935. On 31 October 1940, during the German occupation of Norway, he was removed on the orders of the occupants. He was also imprisoned, first from March to May 1942 in Falstad concentration camp. In September 1944 he was arrested again and incarcerated in Vollan concentration camp until October, then in Berg concentration camp until 29 March 1945. When the occupation ended in 1945, he assumed office again. He left in 1952. In 1948 he was appointed as County Governor of Sør-Trøndelag, which he held to 1958.

Ivar Skjånes was biographed in 2002 (Røde dager og blå timer : Ivar Skjånes 1888-1975 : et liv og en epoke).

He had a daughter Bodil Skjånes Dugstad and a son.

Political offices
Preceded by Harald Pedersen	Mayor of Trondheim; 1935–1940	Succeeded by Olav Bergan
Preceded by Sverre Stokstad	Mayor of Trondheim; 1945–1952	Succeeded by John Aae
Preceded by Johan Cappelen	County Governor of Sør-Trøndelag; 1948–1958	Succeeded by Thor Skrindo
