= Jon Åker =

Norwegian hospital director

Jon Erik Åker
- Born: February 26, 1927; Norway
- Died: April 18, 2013 (aged 86)
- Education: Norwegian School of Economics; University of Michigan (MHA)
- Occupation: Hospital director
- Known for: Director of Akershus University Hospital (1969–1997)
- Awards: King's Medal of Merit (gold, 1994); Honorary member of the Norwegian Hospital Association (1996)

Jon Erik Åker (February 26, 1927 – April 18, 2013) was a Norwegian hospital director.

He grew up with his grandparents in rural Sunnfjord, and attended Firda Upper Secondary School before going on to the Norwegian School of Economics. He was hired as manager at Lillehammer Hospital in 1955 and financial director at the Red Cross Clinic in 1958. He graduated as a Master of Hospital Administration from the University of Michigan in 1963. In 1964 he was hired as secretary at Akershus University Hospital. Following a leave to serve as manager of the refugee hospital Augusta Victoria Hospital in Jerusalem, he was promoted to financial director at Akershus University Hospital. He was then the long-serving director of Akershus University Hospital from 1969 to 1997.

In 1994, he received the King's Medal of Merit in gold, and in 1996 he became an honorary member of the Norwegian Hospital Association. He died in April 2013.
