= Lilleby smelteverk =

Smeltmill in Lilleby, Norway

Coordinates: 63.4415°N 10.4451°E

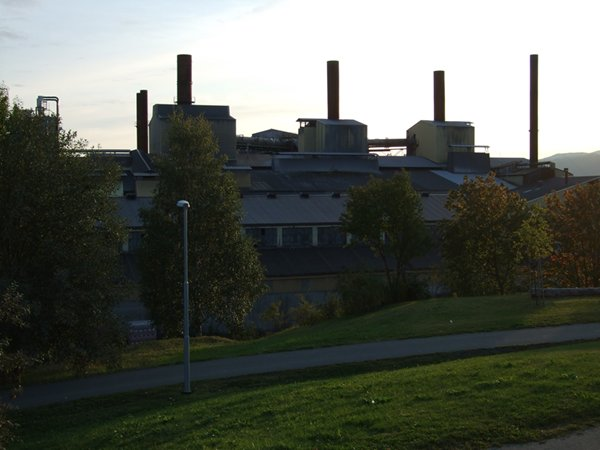
- Interactive map of the Lilleby smelteverk area

General information
- Inaugurated: October 1, 1927

Lilleby smelteverk was a smeltmill located in Lilleby, Trondheim, Sør-Trøndelag county, Norway, next to City Lade. It is well known for having produced the world's cleanest ferrosilicon (an alloy that contains iron and silicon) for NASA. Shut down in December 20th, 2002, the production moved to Mo I Rana. The building is demolished.

== Early years (1927–1949) ==
Harald Pedersen founded the Lilleby smelteverk in 1927. He worked with a chemical process which later has been called the Pederson-2 process. It consists of melting ironmalm which gives ferrosilicon as a by-product.

== Occupation years (1940–1945) ==
Lilleby closed on the same day Norway was attacked by Nazi Germany, but it did not remain closed for long. The Norwegian aluminium industry was of great strategic importance for the German government, which requested that Lilleby resume operation right away. Birger Solberg was placed in charge, because professor Pedersen had left with his family to Sweden. Solberg was dismissed the day that Pederson returned, undoubtedly related to his views on the occupation, which differed from Professor Pedersen's views: Pedersen was a supporter of Nazi Germany and wanted to collaborate with the occupation.

During the war, the plant was geared mostly towards aluminium, which was more important for the German war effort; however, many employees sabotaged the work in order to keep productivity low.

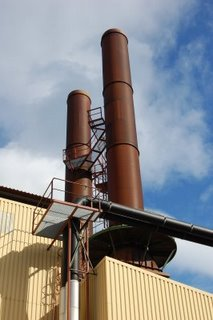

== Post-World War II ==
After the war, Birger Solberg resumed control, but the economics and equipment of the facility had become unfavorable. Feeling empathy for the former workers, he devised a new business plan based on collecting German plane wrecks and other debris in middle-Norway and re-melting them.

The facility was closed on December 20, 2002 and production moved to Mo i Rana.
