= Einar Dahl =

Einar Dahl may refer to:

- Einar Dahl (Esperantist) (1904–1979), Swedish Esperantist
- Einar Dahl (politician) (1880–?), Norwegian barrister and politician
