= Andreas Berg =

Norwegian lawyer, banker and politician

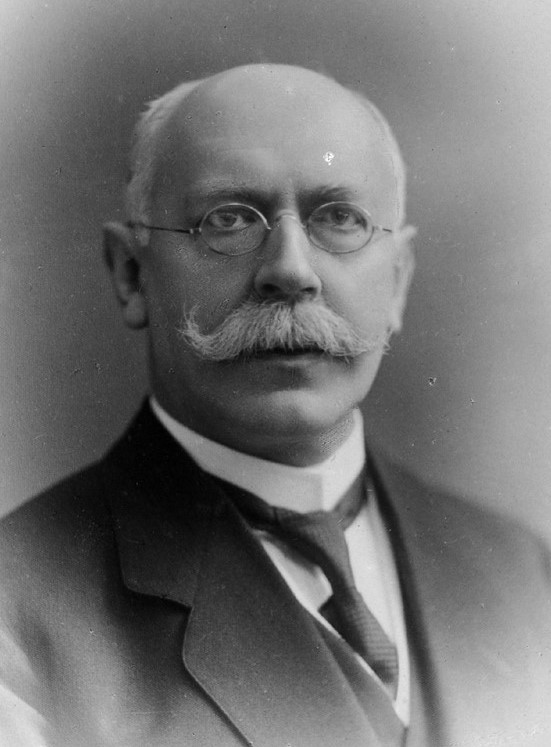
Andreas Berg in 1926

Andreas Berg (4 October 1861 – 29 June 1944) was a Norwegian lawyer, banker and politician for the Conservative Party.

He was born in Trondhjem as a son of bank treasurer Lauritz Berg and Regine Fredrikke Wanvig. In 1881 he married cityfellow Petra Larsen. He took the examen artium at Trondhjem Cathedral School in 1879 and graduated from the Royal Frederick University with the cand.jur. degree in 1883. After a period as a deputy judge in Trondhjem City Court, he worked as an attorney in the city from 1885. In 1901 he became chief executive officer of the bank Den nordenfjeldske Kreditbank. He retired after 28 years in the bank. He was also a board member of Centralbanken for Norge and several other ventures.

Berg served as Mayor of Trondheim from 1899 to 1901 and 1908 to 1910. He was elected to the Parliament of Norway from the constituency Trondhjem og Levanger in 1903, and served through one term as a member of the Standing Committee on Constitutional Affairs. In 1905 he was a member of the Special Committee that oversaw the development in the consular case, which caused the dissolution of the union between Norway and Sweden.

He received the 7th June Medal and the Coronation Medal, and was decorated as a Commander, Second Class of the Order of St. Olav. He died in June 1944.

Political offices
Preceded by Bernhard Konrad Bergersen	Mayor of Trondheim; 1899–1901	Succeeded by Hans Jørgen Bauck
Preceded by Christian Thaulow	Mayor of Trondheim; 1908–1910	Succeeded by Odd Sverressøn Klingenberg
