= Olav Gjærevoll =

Norwegian botanist and politician (1916–1994)

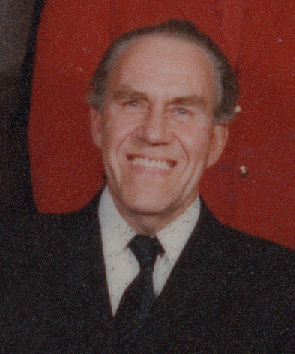
- Gjærevoll in 1980

Mayor of Trondheim Municipality
- In office 1 January 1980 – 31 December 1981
- Deputy: Anne-Kathrine Parow
- Preceded by: Axel Buch
- Succeeded by: Anne-Kathrine Parow
- In office 1 January 1958 – 31 January 1963
- Deputy: Odd Sagør
- Preceded by: John Aae
- Succeeded by: Odd Sagør

Minister of the Environment
- In office 8 May 1972 – 18 October 1972
- Prime Minister: Trygve Bratteli
- Preceded by: Position established
- Succeeded by: Trygve Haugeland

Minister of Pay and Prices
- In office 17 March 1971 – 8 May 1972
- Prime Minister: Trygve Bratteli
- Preceded by: Dagfinn Vårvik
- Succeeded by: Position abolished

Minister of Social Affairs
- In office 25 September 1963 – 12 October 1965
- Prime Minister: Einar Gerhardsen
- Preceded by: Kjell Bondevik
- Succeeded by: Egil Aarvik
- In office 4 February 1963 – 28 August 1963
- Prime Minister: Einar Gerhardsen
- Preceded by: Olav Bruvik
- Succeeded by: Kjell Bondevik

Personal details
- Born: 24 September 1916 Alvdal, Hedmark, Norway
- Died: 30 August 1994 (aged 77) Trondheim, Sør-Trøndelag, Norway
- Party: Labour
- Occupation: Botanist; Politician

Olav Gjærevoll (24 September 1916 – 30 August 1994) was a Norwegian botanist and politician for the Labour Party. Gjærevoll was a professor of botany at the University of Trondheim from 1958 to 1986, and was a specialist in alpine plants. In politics, he served as Minister of Social Affairs from February to August 1963 and again from September 1963 to October 1965; as the last Minister of Pay and Prices from 1971 to 1972 and as the first Minister of the Environment from May to October 1972. He also served as Mayor of Trondheim from 1958 to 1963 and again from 1980 to 1981.

== Biography ==
=== Early life and education ===
Olav Gjærevoll was born in 1916 and grew up on a small farm at the foot of Tronfjell mountain in Norway. From his childhood, he developed a fascination with the alpine flora of the mountain regions. His path to higher education was initially hindered by economic difficulties. When he finally began university studies, the outbreak of World War II interrupted his academic progress. In 1941, Gjærevoll fled to Sweden as he was involved in the resistance movement against the Nazi occupation of Norway.

During his exile in Sweden, Gjærevoll's academic career took a major turn when he connected with Professor Gustaf Einar Du Rietz, the influential head of plant biology at Uppsala University. Du Rietz assigned him to study the vegetation on the border mountains between Sweden and Norway, focusing on Torne lappmark and the field station established there. After the war ended, Gjærevoll completed his undergraduate degree in 1946 with a thesis on the vegetation in the snowbeds of Oviksfjellen. He later expanded this research to encompass the vegetation throughout the Scandinavian Mountains, which became the basis for his doctoral dissertation defended in 1956.

== Academic career ==
Gjærevoll was appointed professor of botany at the Royal Norwegian Society of Sciences and Letters' Museum (Det Kongelige Norske Videnskabers Selskab) in 1958. He later became the museum's director in 1974, a position he held until 1980. During his tenure, he played a pivotal role in the process that led to the establishment of the University of Trondheim.

As an alpine botanist, Gjærevoll became deeply interested in the overwintering theory (also known as the glacial survival hypothesis), which addresses how certain plant species may have survived the ice ages in Scandinavia. He emerged as one of the theory's most forceful defenders, contributing to the academic discourse on plant migration and survival strategies during glacial periods.

Gjærevoll was not only a researcher but also an enthusiastic photographer and lecturer. He travelled extensively throughout Norway, presenting slide shows and delivering lectures, often at folk academies. This approach made him a popular academic figure among the general public, effectively bridging the gap between scientific research and public understanding.

== Political career ==
Alongside his scientific pursuits, Gjærevoll developed a substantial political career. He served as the mayor of Trondheim for several years and was elected to the Storting (Norwegian Parliament). His political service extended to ministerial positions in three different governments, most notably as Minister of Environmental Protection. In this capacity, he successfully championed several major conservation initiatives, including the establishment of national parks and protected areas, advancing the preservation of Norwegian natural environments. His political work was deeply informed by his scientific understanding of ecosystems and biodiversity.

== Scientific contributions ==
=== The glacial survival theory ===
Gjærevoll's most significant scientific contribution was his comprehensive work on the glacial survival theory. This theory, which emerged as a byproduct of Axel Blytt's groundbreaking ideas from 1876, concerns how plant species migrated and populated Scandinavia after the ice ages. The theory posits that not all of Scandinavia was completely covered by ice during glacial periods, and that some plant species might have survived in ice-free refugia or nunataks (mountain peaks protruding above the ice sheets).

In February 1959, Gjærevoll delivered a lecture titled Overvintringsteoriens stilling i dag ("The position of the theory of glacial survival today") at the Royal Norwegian Society of Sciences and Letters. In this presentation, he systematically summarised the arguments for the glacial survival theory, examining botanical evidence and distribution patterns that suggested certain plant species had survived the ice ages locally rather than completely recolonising Scandinavia afterwards.

Gjærevoll acknowledged that while most of the available evidence consisted of indications rather than definitive proof, the cumulative weight of these indications was compelling enough to support the theory. He called for interdisciplinary cooperation, particularly with geologists, to establish more concrete evidence for the theory.

=== Field research and publications ===
Gjærevoll conducted extensive field research throughout the Scandinavian mountain range, with a particular focus on snowbed vegetation. His doctoral dissertation on this subject became a foundation for understanding alpine plant communities in Scandinavia. He extended his research beyond Norway, travelling to southern Greenland to study Jensen's Nunataks, where he examined plant life on these ice-free mountain peaks to better understand how similar areas in Norway might have supported plant life during glacial periods.

His field guide Fjellflora ("Mountain Flora"), first published in 1952 and continuously updated until 2010, became a standard reference work for botanists and nature enthusiasts interested in Scandinavian alpine flora. In 1950 he issued the exsiccata (sets of dried herbarium specimens) M. Foslie: Lithothamnia selecta exsiccata distributing specimens collected by Mikael Heggelund Foslie.

== Legacy ==
Olav Gjærevoll's dual legacy spans both scientific advancement and practical conservation. As a botanist, his research contributed to the understanding of Scandinavian alpine flora and plant survival mechanisms during glacial periods. While more recent molecular and genetic research has provided a more nuanced view of the glacial survival theory than was available during his lifetime, his systematic compilation of evidence and advocacy for the theory stimulated further research and debate in the field.

In environmental policy, Gjærevoll's work as Norway's Minister of Environmental Protection established foundations for conservation practices that continue to protect Norwegian natural landscapes. The national parks and nature reserves he helped establish preserve biodiversity and provide research sites for contemporary botanists.

The contemporary scientific consensus on glacial plant survival, as formulated at a 1993 meeting in Bergen shortly before Gjærevoll's death, reflects a more differentiated view than he advocated: "The problem is not whether plants have survived the glaciation locally in northern Europe, but where this took place for each individual species". This refinement of the theory, supported by advances in molecular systematics, builds upon the groundwork laid by researchers like Gjærevoll while acknowledging the complexity of individual species' histories.

Gjærevoll died in 1994, leaving behind a substantial body of scientific work and significant conservation achievements that continue to influence both botanical research and environmental policy in Norway.

Political offices
Preceded by Aase Bjerkholt	Norwegian Minister of Social Affairs; 1963	Succeeded by Kjell Bondevik
Preceded by Kjell Bondevik	Norwegian Minister of Social Affairs; 1963–1965	Succeeded by Egil Aarvik
Preceded by Dagfinn Vårvik	Norwegian Minister of Wages and Prices; 1971–1972	Post abolished
New ministerial post	Norwegian Minister of the Environment; 1972	Succeeded by Trygve Haugeland
Preceded by John Aae	Mayor of Trondheim; 1958–1963	Succeeded by Odd Sagør
Preceded by Axel Buch	Mayor of Trondheim; 1979–1981	Succeeded by Anne Kathrine Parow
