= Peder Morset =

Norwegian teacher and resistance member

Peder Morset (4 April 1887 – 19 May 1943) was a Norwegian teacher and resistance member.

Born in Selbu Municipality in Søndre Trondhjem county, Norway, he was the son of Ole Henriksen Morset (1864–1935) and Ingborg Berntine Petersdatter (1864–1947). He was educated as a teacher and began his teaching career in his village. In 1913, Morset married Marit Stugudal (1893–1948). The couple had seven sons.

During the German occupation of Norway, Morset came into contact with a group organized by Henry Thingstad in Trondheim. Chairing the local chapter of the Norwegian Teachers' Union (Norges Lærerlag), he was also the local representative of the teachers' civil resistance. Several of his sons were also deeply involved in the resistance. Morset and his family helped refugees to flee to Sweden. However his resistance group was infiltrated by agents of Henry Rinnan and Morset was arrested, sentenced to death and executed at Kristiansten Fortress in Trondheim in 1943. After the liberation, Morset was buried on 29 May 1945 along with the ashes of his son Niklas. The six surviving sons carried the coffin. The fate of Morset and his family was treated by journalist Per Hansson in his 1963 book – og tok de enn vårt liv .
