= Fagerbakke (surname) =

Fagerbakke is a surname. Notable people with the surname include:

- Bill Fagerbakke (born 1957), American actor
- Knut Fagerbakke (born 1952), Norwegian politician
