= Sverre Pedersen =

Norwegian architect and urban planner

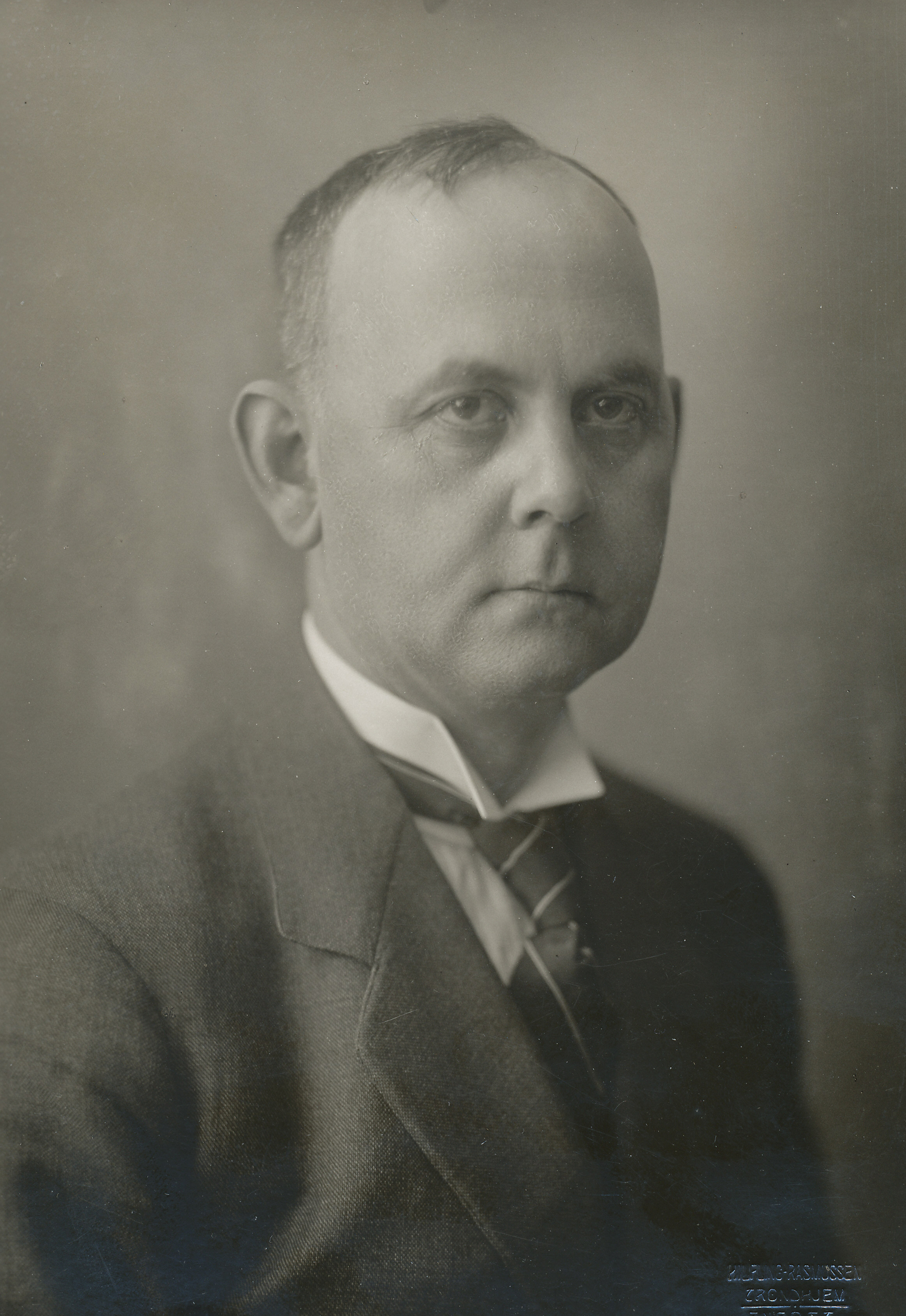
- Born: 4 August 1882; Strinda, Norway
- Died: 12 November 1971 (aged 89); Trondheim
- Occupations: Architect; Urban planner
- Children: Einar Sverre Pedersen
- Relatives: Harald Pedersen (brother); Marie Pedersen (sister)

Sverre Pedersen (4 August 1882 – 12 November 1971) was a Norwegian architect and urban planner.

== Biography ==
He was born in Strinda Municipality (part of present-day Trondheim Municipality in Trøndelag county), Norway. He was the son of Hans Martinius Pedersen and Christine Elisabeth Andersen. He was a brother of industrialist Harald Pedersen (1888–1945) and pedagogue Marie Pedersen (1893–1990). He was married to Edith Gretchen Børseth from 1913, and they were parents to aviator Einar Sverre Pedersen (1919–2008) .

He was educated at the Norwegian Institute of Technology (1901), and the Technische Hochschulen in Hanover (1902-1903) and Charlottenburg.

In 1905, he was employed by the city of Trondheim. From 1908, he was a department architect and in 1914 he received the position of city architect. Pedersen was appointed professor in the Architectural Department at the Norwegian Institute of Technology from 1920 to 1954. He was the advisor of architect Maja Melandsø during her studies there; she also worked as his assistant for a short time. He was a pioneer in urban planning, and was in charge of the reconstruction of 24 cities, towns and villages in Norway that had been damaged during the Norwegian Campaign in 1940. Pedersen designed urban plans for, among others, Narvik, Alta, Vadsø, Hammerfest, Kirkenes, Molde, Kristiansund, Bodø and Steinkjer.

He was a member of the Norwegian Academy of Science and Letters and was awarded the King's Medal of Merit (Kongens fortjenstmedalje) in 1961.
