= Einar Sverre Pedersen =

Norwegian aviator

- Born: 29 January 1919; Trondheim, Norway
- Died: 26 January 2008 (aged 88)
- Occupation: Aviator (navigator)
- Known for: Navigation pioneer in the Arctic
- Spouse: Ingrid Pedersen
- Parent: Sverre Pedersen
- Relatives: Harald Pedersen (uncle); Marie Pedersen (aunt)

Einar Sverre Pedersen (29 January 1919 – 26 January 2008) was a Norwegian aviator.

He was born in Trondheim to architect Sverre Pedersen and Edith Gretchen Børseth, and was a nephew of industrialist Harald Pedersen and pedagogue Marie Pedersen. He was married to Ewy Maria Westerberg from 1941, and to pilot Ingrid Elisabeth Liljegren from 1958.

During World War II, Pedersen was trained as navigator at the camp Little Norway in Toronto, Canada, and further served with the RAF Ferry Command and the No. 330 Squadron RNoAF. From 1946 he was assigned with the Scandinavian Airlines (SAS), as navigator on transatlantic flights. He was instrumental in the development of navigational aids for commercial traffic over polar regions, and was navigator on the first passenger flight crossing the Arctic in November 1952. His wife Ingrid Elisabeth Liljegren was the first woman to fly over the North Pole, in 1963, with Pedersen as navigator.
