= Axel Buch =

Norwegian politician (1930–1998)

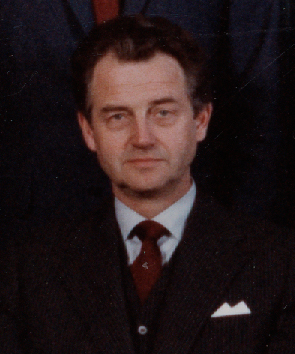
- Buch in 1982.

Mayor of Trondheim
- In office 1 January 1976 – 31 December 1979
- Preceded by: Kaare Tønne
- Succeeded by: Olav Gjærevoll

Deputy Representative in the Norwegian Parliament
- In office 1 October 1981 – 30 September 1985
- Constituency: Sør-Trøndelag
- In office 1 October 1977 – 30 September 1981
- Constituency: Sør-Trøndelag

Personal details
- Born: 10 August 1930; Trondheim, Norway
- Died: 30 July 1998 (aged 67); Inderøy, Norway
- Political party: Conservative
- Spouse: Anne-Kathrine Parow

Axel Buch (10 August 1930 – 30 July 1998) was a Norwegian politician from the Conservative Party.

He is known as mayor of Trondheim, the third largest city in Norway, from 1976 to 1979.

Buch served as a deputy representative in the Norwegian Parliament from Sør-Trøndelag during the terms 1977–1981 and 1981–1985.

Preceded by Kåre Tønne	Mayor of Trondheim; 1976–1979	Succeeded by Olav Gjærevoll
