= Liv Sandven =

Norwegian politician

Liv Sandven (born 18 May 1946) is a Norwegian politician from the Christian Democratic Party.

During her time as deputy mayor of Trondheim, the third largest city in Norway, she served as mayor from August 2001 to June 2002 in temporary replacement of Anne Kathrine Slungård.

Sandven served as a deputy representative in the Norwegian Parliament from Sør-Trøndelag during the term 1997–2001.
