= Pedersen process =

Process for refining aluminum

The Pederson process is a process of refining aluminum that first separates iron by reducing it to metal, and reacting alumina with lime to produce calcium aluminate, which is then leached with sodium hydroxide. It is more environmentally friendly than the more well-known Bayer process. This is because instead of producing alumina slag, also known as red mud, it produces pig iron as a byproduct. Red mud is considered both an economic and environmental challenge in the aluminum industry because it is considered a waste, with little benefit. It destroys the environment with its high pH, and is costly to maintain, even when in a landfill. Iron, however, is used in the manufacture of steel, and has structural uses in civil engineering and chemical uses as a catalyst.

== History ==
The Pedersen process was invented by Harald Pedersen in the 1920s and used in Norway for over 40 years before shutting down due to the Pedersen process being less economically competitive than the Bayer process. However, it is believed a modern Pedersen process could be economically viable with "low-quality" bauxite, as even though "low-quality" bauxite has less alumina in the form of trihydrate gibbsite, it has more iron oxide which would be converted to pig iron in the smelting process instead of red mud.

== Use in aluminum production ==
In most of today's primary aluminium production, aluminum ore, also known as bauxite, is first processed into alumina through the Bayer process. This step could be replaced by the Pedersen process—either result in alumina. Unlike the smelting processes of iron and coal into steel or copper and tin into bronze, which require thermal energy, alumina must be smelted with electrical energy. This is done through the Hall–Héroult process that produces 99.5–99.8% pure aluminum from alumina.
