= Einar Dahl (politician) =

Norwegian barrister and politician

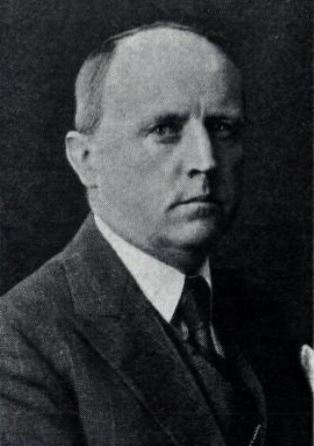
Photo of Einar Dahlin 1930

Einar Dahl (15 November 1880 – 3 August 1956) was a Norwegian barrister and politician for the Conservative Party.

He was born in Trondhjem as a son of judge Hartvig Bernhard Dadhl (1841–1903) and Therese Mathilde Ellingsen (1850–1919). He was married to merchant's daughter Inger Goltermann from 1908 until her death in 1945, then from 1946 to Kristine Lorck, a sister of banker Hans Skirstad.

He took the examen artium in 1899 and graduated from the Royal Frederick University with the cand.jur. degree in 1904. He settled as an attorney in Trondhjem, and from 1926 he was a barrister with access to work with Supreme Court cases. He was known as a prosecutor in Trondheim City Court.

He chaired the boards of Forretningsbanken, Trondhjems Mekaniske Verksted and Norske Alliance (locally), was the vice chairman of the Norwegian Bar Association and was a board member of Trondhjems Sparebank. From 1920 to 1921 he served as the Mayor of Trondheim.

Political offices
Preceded by Ole Konrad Ribsskog	Mayor of Trondheim; 1920–1921	Succeeded by Francis Kjeldsberg
