= Ingrid Pedersen =

Swedish-American aviator

- Born: Ingrid Elisabeth Liljegren; 17 April 1933; Stockholm, Sweden
- Died: 11 September 2012 (aged 79); Anchorage, Alaska
- Occupation: Aviator
- Known for: first female pilot to fly over the North Pole
- Spouse: Einar Sverre Pedersen

Ingrid Pedersen (17 April 1933 – 11 September 2012) was a Swedish-American aviator. She was the first female pilot to fly over the North Pole.

Ingrid Elisabeth Liljegren was born in Stockholm, Sweden. She was the daughter of Sivert Roland Liljegren (1908–75) and Maud Berg (1915–82). In 1957, Ingrid received her private pilot license in Sweden. In 1958 she was married to Einar Sverre Pedersen (1919–2008). In 1962, the family moved to Anchorage, Alaska where Einar Pedersen was stationed as a Scandinavian Airlines navigator on intercontinental flights.

In 1963 with her husband as navigator, Ingrid Pedersen set out flying a single-engine Cessna 205 aircraft from Fairbanks, Alaska, over the geographic North Pole and continuing to Bodø, Norway. Ingrid and Einar emigrated to the United States in 1979. Einar Pedersen died in 2008. Ingrid Pedersen died during 2012 in Anchorage, Alaska.
