= Anne Kathrine Slungård =

Norwegian politician (born 1964)

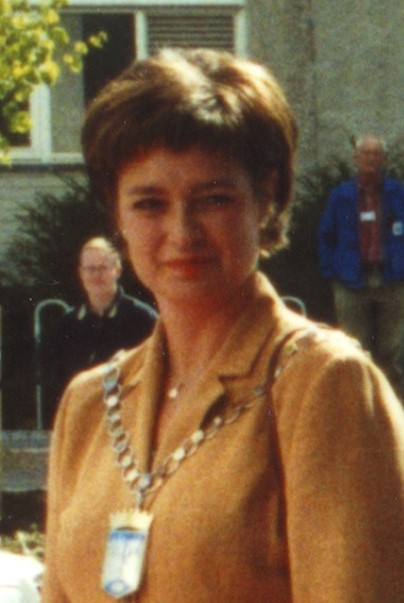
Anne Kathrine Slungård in 2000

Anne Kathrine Slungård (born 14 January 1964) is a Norwegian politician for the Conservative Party.

She is known as mayor of Trondheim, the third largest city in Norway, from 1998 to 2003. From August 2001 to June 2002 the deputy mayor Liv Sandven replaced Slungård temporarily as mayor. Slungård served as a deputy representative in the Parliament of Norway from Sør-Trøndelag during the terms 1997–2001, 2001–2005 and 2009–2013. From 2002 she was a member of the Conservative Party central board.

In 2004 she became director of communications in SINTEF. She was also a member of the Broadcasting Council from 1998 and the Norwegian Criminal Cases Review Commission from 2003, board member of Statskog from 2003 to 2005, and vice president in the Norwegian Skiing Association from 2003. In 2007 she became chair of Siemens Norway. She has also headed the election committee in Statoil.

Political offices
Preceded by Marvin Wiseth	Mayor of Trondheim; 1998–2003	Succeeded by Rita Ottervik
