= Odd Sagør =

Norwegian politician

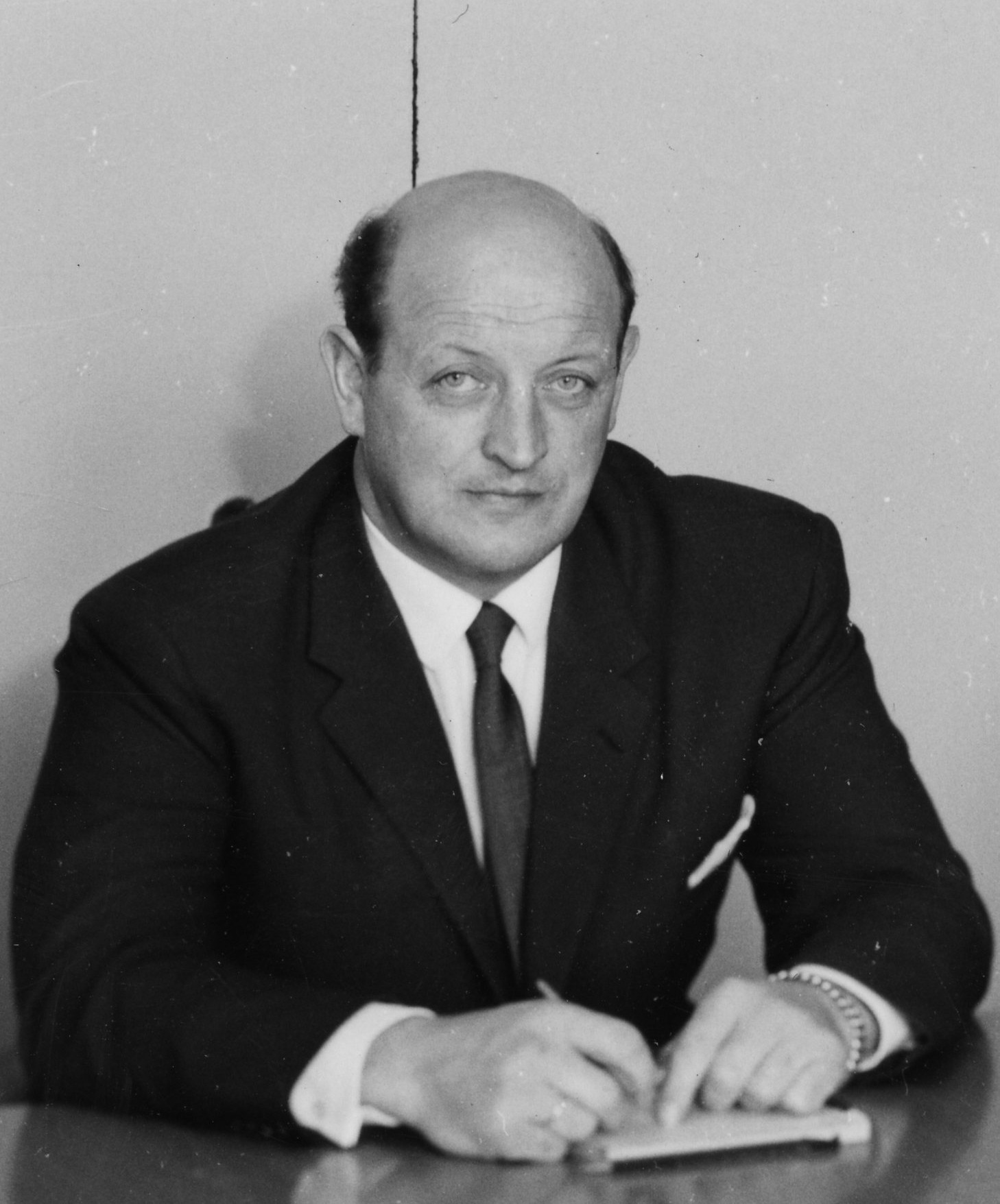
Odd Georg Sagør in 1963

Odd Georg Sagør (born 2 July 1918 in Meldal Municipality, died 24 June 1993) was a Norwegian politician for the Labour Party.

He was Minister of Consumer Affairs and Administration from 1973 to 1976, during the second cabinet Bratteli.

On the local level he was a member of the municipal council of Trondheim Municipality from 1945 to 1970, serving as deputy mayor from 1959 to 1963 and mayor from 1963 to 1970.

Outside politics he spent most of his career (1936–1970) in Norges Brannkasse. From 1976 to 1986 he was chief administrative officer (rådmann) in Trondheim. He was a member of the board of Arbeideravisa from 1946 to 1959, and of the Norwegian Association of Local and Regional Authorities from 1972 to 1976.

Political offices
| Preceded by Olav Gjærevoll | Mayor of Trondheim; 1963–1970 | Succeeded by Kåre Tønne |
| Preceded by Eva Kolstad | Norwegian Minister of Consumer Affairs and Administration; 1973–1976 | Succeeded by Annemarie Lorentzen |
