= Marie Pedersen =

Norwegian aided education pedagogue (1893-1990)

Marie Lovise Pedersen
- Born: 16 January 1893; Trondheim, Norway
- Died: 27 July 1990 (aged 97); Trondheim
- Occupation: Special education pedagogue
- Relatives: Sverre Pedersen (brother); Harald Pedersen (brother); Einar Sverre Pedersen (nephew)

Marie Lovise Pedersen (16 January 1893 – 27 July 1990) was a Norwegian aided education pedagogue. She was born in Trondheim to Hans Martinius Pedersen and Christine Elisabeth Andersen, and was a sister of architect Sverre Pedersen and metallurgist Harald Pedersen. She died in Trondheim in 1990.

Pedersen graduated as teacher in 1913, and received further education from the University of Geneva and the University of Zurich. She was teacher and headmaster of the Trondheim school of special education. From 1939 to 1962 she served as director of the Directorate for special schools (Norwegian: Direktoratet for spesialskolene). She wrote the book Intelligensprøving av barn in 1933, and was co-author of De evnesvake i skole og samfunn from 1946.
