= Ole Konrad Ribsskog =

Norwegian educator and politician

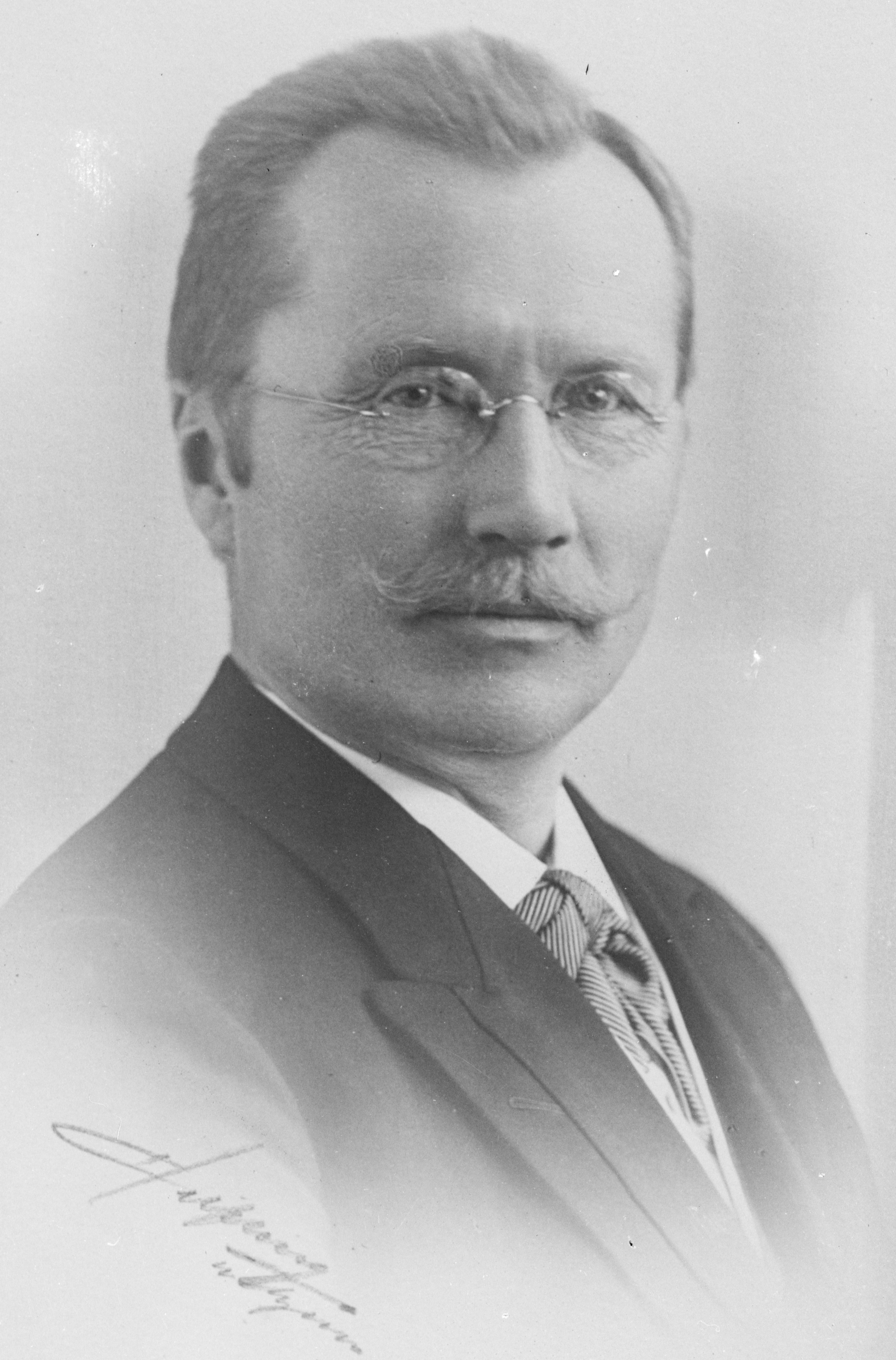
- Born: 8 December 1865; Flatanger Municipality, Norway
- Died: 26 January 1941 (aged 75)
- Occupations: Educator and politician

Ole Konrad Ribsskog (8 December 1865 – 26 January 1941) was a Norwegian educator and politician for the Labour and the Social Democratic Labour parties.

== Biography ==
He was born in Flatanger Municipality as a son of farmers Johannes Olsen Ribsskog (1838–1910) and Marta Marie Ribsskog, née Høstland (1847–1901). He was an older brother of Adolf Ribsskog, headmaster and mayor of Steinkjer Municipality, and Bernhof Ribsskog, educator and social democratic politician.

He was elected to the Parliament of Norway from the constituency Baklandet in 1913, and served one term.

On the local level he was elected to Trondhjem city council in 1907. From 1917 to 1919 he was mayor. He also chaired the local party chapter. From 1921 to 1927 he was a member of the Social Democratic Labour Party.

Outside politics he worked as a schoolteacher. He had studied in Sweden, Denmark and Germany, worked as a teacher in Flatanger, Spydeberg, and Drøbak before moving to Trondhjem in 1893. From 1911 he was headmaster at Trondhjem Public School.

He died in January 1941 when hit by a tram.

Political offices
Preceded by Odd Sverressøn Klingenberg	Mayor of Trondheim; 1917–1919	Succeeded by Einar Dahl
