= Marvin Wiseth =

Norwegian politician (born 1951)

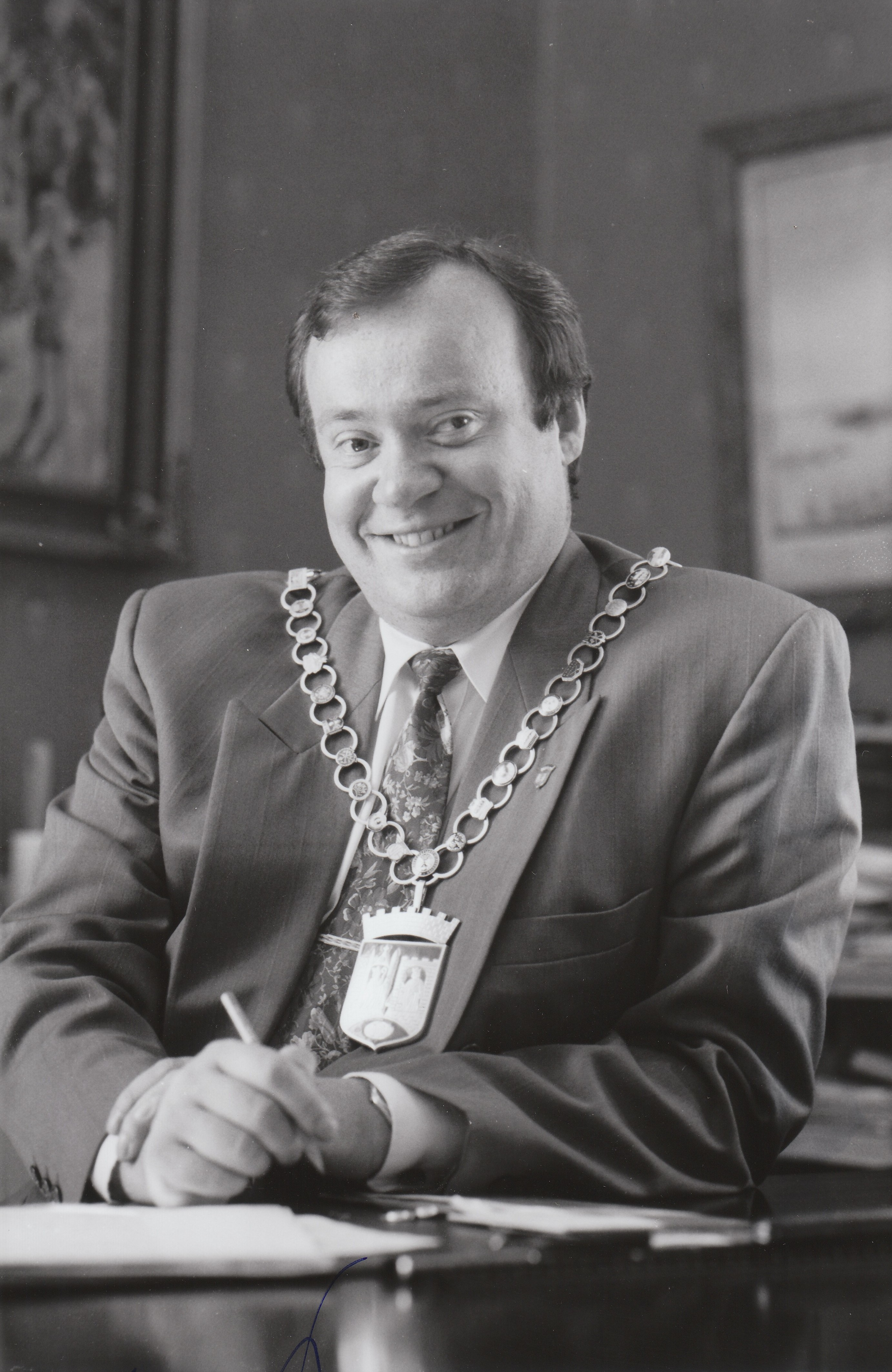
Marvin Wiseth

Marvin Wiseth (born 20 January 1951) is a Norwegian politician from the Conservative Party.

He is known as the former mayor of Trondheim, the third largest city in Norway, from 1990 to 1998. He had been a member of the city council since 1976. During his period as mayor the city hosted the FIS Nordic World Ski Championships 1997. Wiseth was also central in the failed Trondheim's 2018 Winter Olympics bid.

Wiseth served as a deputy representative in the Norwegian Parliament from Sør-Trøndelag during the term 1977–1981.

Preceded by Per Berge	Mayor of Trondheim; 1990–1998	Succeeded by Anne Kathrine Slungård
