= Glacial refugium =

Geographic region during ice ages

A glacial refugium (plural glacial refugia) is a geographic region which made possible the survival of flora and fauna during ice ages and allowed for post-glacial re-colonization. Different types of glacial refugia can be distinguished, namely nunatak, peripheral, and lowland. Glacial refugia have been suggested as a major cause of floral and faunal distribution patterns in both temperate and tropical latitudes. With respect to disjunct populations of modern-day species, especially in birds, doubt has been cast on the validity of such inferences, as much of the differentiation between populations observed today may have occurred before or after their restriction to refugia. In contrast, isolated geographic locales that host one or more critically endangered species (regarded as paleoendemics or glacial relicts) are generally uncontested as bona fide glacial refugia.

== Identification ==
Traditionally, the identification of glacial refugia has occurred through paleoecological analysis, which examines fossil organisms and their remains to determine the origins of modern taxa. For example, paleoecological approaches have been used to reconstruct the distributions of pollen in Europe for the 13,000 years since the last glaciation. Researchers in this case ultimately established the spread of forest trees from the mountainous southern fringe of Europe, which suggests that this area served as a glacial refugium during this time.

== Types ==
Four distinct types of glacial refugium have been identified:

=== Hot spring oases ===
This type of refugium is created by an influx of hydrothermal waters which maintains a humid and warm microclimate that allowed thermophilous trees like oak (Quercus), linden (Tilia), and common ash (Fraxinus excelsior) to survive the last ice age in Central Europe.

=== Nunatak ===
A nunatak is a type of glacial refugium located on the snow-free, exposed peaks of mountains, which lie above the ice sheet during glaciations. The identification of ‘diversity hotspots’ in areas that should have been migration regions during major glacial episodes is evidence for nunatak glacial refugia. For example, the Monte Rosa mountain ranges, the Avers, and the Engadine and the Bernina are all floristically rich proposed nunatak regions, which are indicative of nunatak glacial survival.

=== Peripheral ===
Like nunataks, peripheral glacial refugia exist within mountain systems; they differ in that they are located at the borders of mountain systems. Evidence for peripheral refugia can be found along the borders of the Carpathian Mountains, Pyrenees, and European Alps, all of which were once glaciated mountain systems. For example, using the amplified fragment length polymorphism (AFLP) technique, researchers have inferred survival of Phyteuma globulariifolium in peripheral refugia in the European Alps.

=== Lowland ===
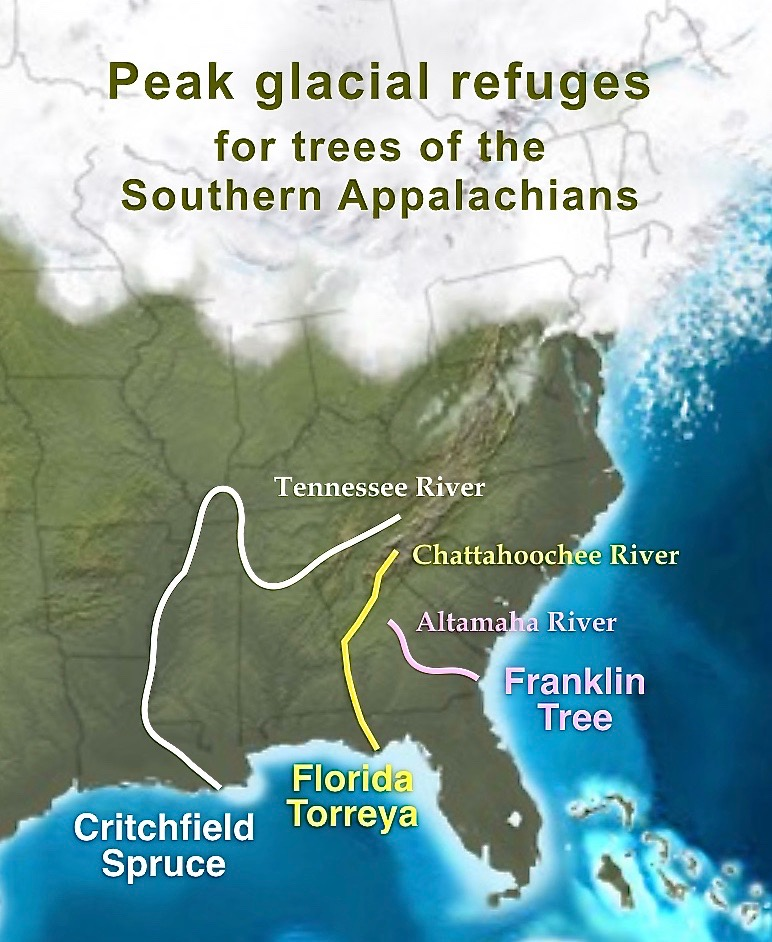

Lowland glacial refugia, unlike nunatak and peripheral glacial refugia, are found at low elevations rather than in mountains. Situated beyond the limits of ice shields, lowland refugia have been identified for several plant and animal species. In Europe, for example, researchers using allozyme analysis have been able to confirm the continuous distribution of Zygaena exulans in between the foothills of the Pyrenees and the Alps during the last ice age.

In eastern North America, lowland glacial refugia along the Atlantic and Gulf Coasts host endemic plants — some of which are rare, even endangered, and others entail the most southerly disjunct populations of plants that commonly appear only hundreds of miles to the north. Major rivers draining southward from the Appalachian Mountains are associated with a gradation of paleoendemic tree species. These range from the extinct Critchfield spruce near the outlet of the Mississippi River, to extinct-in-the-wild Franklinia along the Altamaha River, to the critically endangered Florida torreya and Florida yew at the downstream end of the Chattahoochee River system. (See accompanying illustration.)

== See also ==
- Drought refuge
- Last Glacial Maximum refugia
- Refugium (population biology)
- Glacial survival hypothesis
