= Francis Kjeldsberg =

Norwegian politician

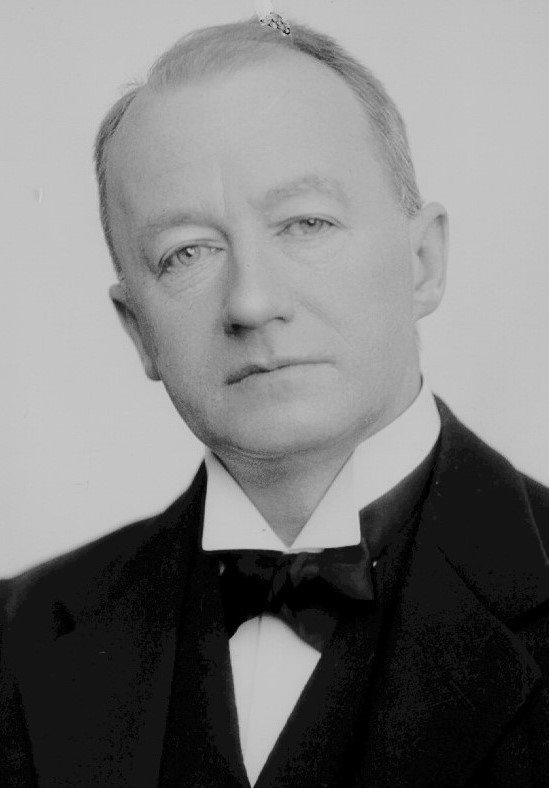
Francis Kjeldsberg

Francis Kjeldsberg, OBE, MVO (10 February 1869 – 24 May 1948) was a Norwegian businessperson and politician for the Conservative Party.

He was born in Trondhjem as a son of consul Rasmus Flor Kjeldsberg (1828–1897) and Harriet Southern (1834–1924). In 1899 he married Margrethe Berg, daughter of merchant Claus Nissen Riiber Berg (1832–1915). Their daughter Harriet married chief physician Odd Kjeldsberg Stub.

He graduated from Kristiania Commerce School in 1887, and studied abroad for one year. He was hired in the family company R. Kjeldsberg in 1890, and was the company owner from 1897 to 1927. From 1897 he was also a vice consul for the United Kingdom, upgrading to consul from 1931 to 1945. He was decorated as a Member of the Royal Victorian Order (1906) and Officer of the Order of the British Empire. From 1927 to 1937 he was the manager of Vinmonopolet's branch in Trondheim.

He chaired the board of R. Kjeldsberg from 1923 and the supervisory council of Trondhjems Realkreditbank from 1915 to 1942. He was a board member of Privatbanken i Trondhjem (1918–1934) and Nordenfjeldske Dampskibsselskab (1927–1942 and in 1945) and supervisory council member of Trondhjems Sparebank (1905–1942).

Kjeldsberg was on the electoral college in the 1903 Norwegian parliamentary election. He served as a member of Trondhjem city council from 1911 to 1928; from 1917 to 1922 as a member of the executive committee. He served as deputy mayor from 1920 to 1921 and mayor in 1922. He was elected as a deputy representative to the Parliament of Norway from the Market towns of Sør-Trøndelag and Nord-Trøndelag counties in 1924, and served through one term. He met in parliamentary session in 1926 and 1927.

During the occupation of Norway by Nazi Germany he was arrested in October 1940 and imprisoned in isolation in Vollan concentration camp. He was released after one week. He died in May 1948.

Political offices
Preceded by Einar Dahl	Mayor of Trondheim; 1922	Succeeded by Kristian Bryn
