= Anne-Kathrine Parow =

Norwegian politician (1938 – 2001)

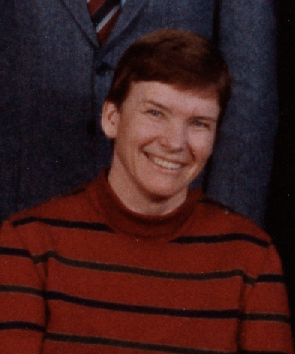
- Anne-Kathrine Parow

Mayor of Trondheim Municipality
- In office January 1, 1982 – December 31, 1984

Deputy Mayor of Trondheim Municipality
- In office 1980–1981

Cultural Director, Trondheim Municipality
- In office 1982–1992

Cultural Director, Steinkjer Municipality
- In office 1993–1997

Personal details
- Born: November 10, 1939
- Died: January 14, 2001 (aged 62)
- Resting place: Havstein Cemetery
- Spouse(s): Peter Parow (first marriage), Axel Buch (second marriage)
- Occupation: Politician

Anne-Kathrine Parow (November 10, 1938 – January 14, 2001) was a Norwegian teacher, cultural director, and politician for the Labour Party (Ap). She served as the mayor of Trondheim Municipality from 1982 to 1984.

== Life and work ==
=== Background ===
Anne-Kathrine Larsen was born in Orkanger as the daughter of the municipal secretary Kolbjørn Jacob Larsen and his wife Esther Togstad. She was the sister of the later mayor of Orkdal Municipality, Rudolf Larsen, and the cousin of the county education director and politician Johan Solheim. She passed the teaching exam at Sagene Teachers' College in 1961 and completed the second part of special education at Trondheim Teachers' College in 1976.

=== Career ===
Anne-Kathrine Larsen was a teacher for five years and worked as a consultant for the school superintendent in Trondheim Municipality for one year. She married the later dentist Peter Parow (brother of Anneliese Dørum).

Parow was first elected to the municipal council of Trondheim Municipality during the so-called "women's coup" in 1971.

Parow served as the deputy mayor of Trondheim from 1980 to 1981. From January 1, 1982, to December 31, 1984, she was the mayor, becoming the first woman in that position. Afterward, she was employed as the cultural director in Trondheim municipality from 1982 to 1992 and as the cultural director in Steinkjer Municipality from 1993 to 1997.

Parow remarried in 1987 to the then-municipal chief executive Axel Buch, a conservative who had previously been her deputy mayor. They lived at Hammer farm in Inderøy Municipality for a few years until his death in 1998.

== Death and legacy ==
Anne-Kathrine Parow died in 2001 after a brief illness. She was buried at Havstein Cemetery. Parow was the first female mayor to have a road named after her, in 2019 in Tiller, Norway.
