= Trond Jensrud =

Norwegian politician (born 1968)

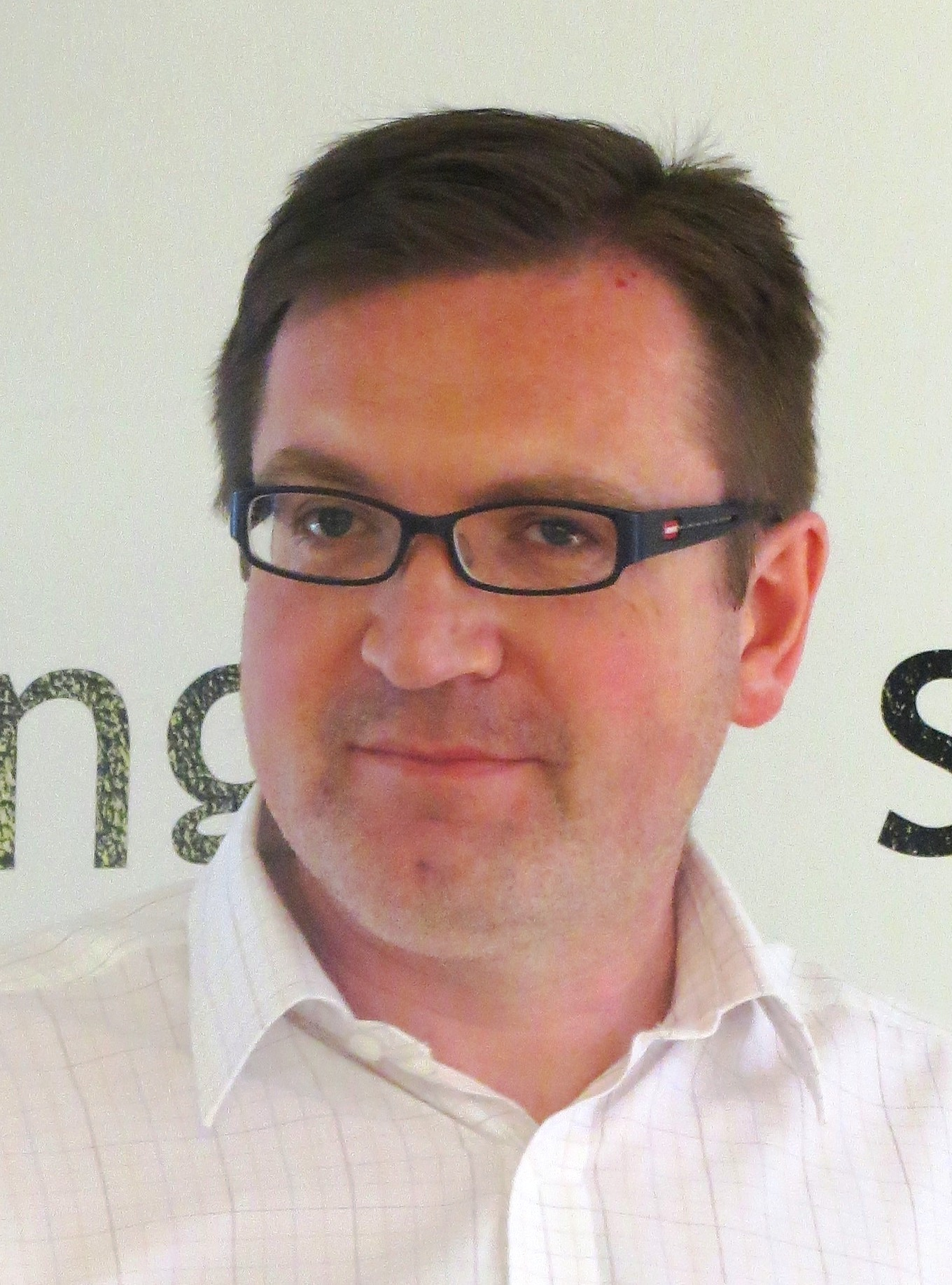
Trond Jensrud

Trond Jensrud (born 2 September 1968 in Ringerike) is a Norwegian politician for the Labour Party.

He was elected to the Norwegian Parliament from Buskerud in 1989, but was not re-elected in 1993.

He was also a member of Buskerud county council in 1995–1996.

Party political offices
| Preceded by Rita Ottervik | Secretary-general of the Workers' Youth League; 1996–1998 | Succeeded by Halvard Ingebrigtsen |
