= John Aae =

Norwegian politician (1890–1968)

John Amandus Aae
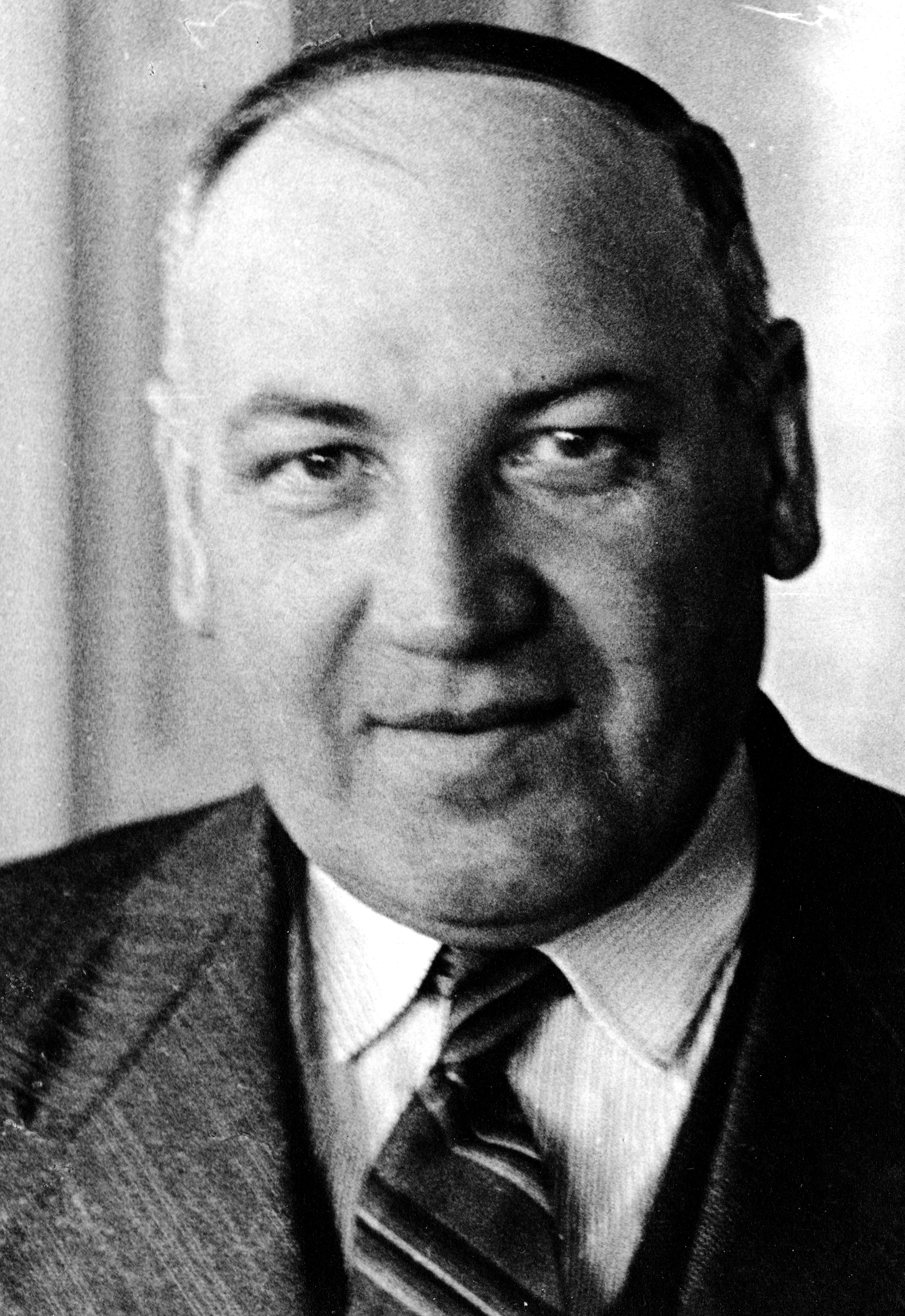

Mayor of Trondheim
- In office 1948–1957
- Preceded by: Nils E. Nilsen
- Succeeded by: Olav Gjærevoll

Deputy Mayor of Trondheim
- In office 1935–1941
- Preceded by: Unknown
- Succeeded by: None (due to German occupation)

Member of Trondheim Municipal Council
- In office 1928–1957

Member of Strinda Municipal Council
- In office 1917–1923

Personal details
- Born: 26 October 1890 Jämtland, Sweden
- Died: 12 January 1968 (aged 77) Norway
- Party: Labour Party
- Occupation: Politician, newspaper manager
- Known for: Establishing Arbeider-Avisen

John Amandus Aae (26 October 1890 – 12 January 1968) was a Norwegian politician for the Labour Party.

He was born in Jämtland, but grew up in Snillfjord Municipality. He became manager of the newspaper Ny Tid in 1919. In the 1923 party split which saw the Communist Party break away from the Labour Party, Aae sided with the Labour Party. As Ny Tid now sided with the Communist Party, Aae and others established a Labour newspaper Arbeider-Avisen. Aae worked as manager from 1924.

Having served as a member of the municipal council for Strinda Municipality from 1917 to 1923, Aae was elected to the municipal council of Trondheim Municipality in 1928. He became deputy mayor in 1935. The German occupation of Norway hampered his career. Arbeider-Avisen was shut down by the authorities in 1941. Aae had to flee to Sweden in 1942, and worked as the camp director at Kjesäter from 1943 to 1945. After the war he returned as deputy mayor, advancing to the position of mayor in 1948. He stepped down in 1957. In 1958 he also stepped down as Arbeider-Avisen manager.

Political offices
| Preceded by Ivar Skjånes | Mayor of Trondheim Municipality; 1952–1958 | Succeeded by Olav Gjærevoll |
