= Odd Sverressøn Klingenberg =

Norwegian politician

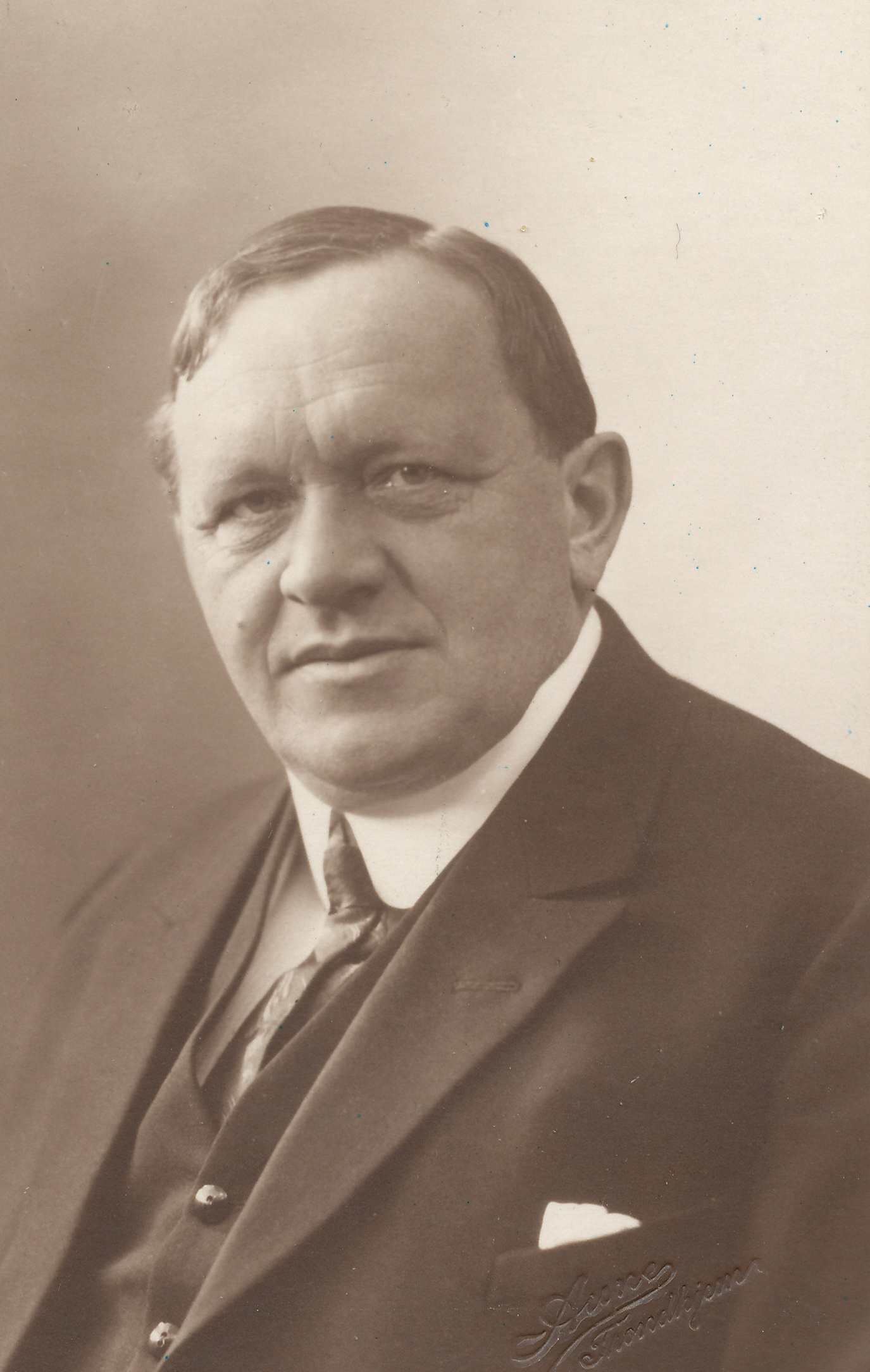
- Klingenberg sometime during the 1930s.

County Governor of Sør-Trøndelag
- In office 1 July 1921 – 15 January 1940
- Monarch: Haakon VII
- Prime Minister: Otto Blehr; Otto B. Halvorsen; Abraham Berge; J. L. Mowinckel; Christopher Hornsrud; Peder Kolstad; Jens Hundseid; Johan Nygaardsvold
- Preceded by: Harald Bothner
- Succeeded by: Johan Cappelen

Minister of Social Affairs
- In office 6 March 1923 – 25 July 1924
- Prime Minister: Otto B. Halvorsen; Abraham Berge
- Preceded by: Rasmus Mortensen
- Succeeded by: Lars Oftedal
- In office 21 June 1920 – 22 June 1921
- Prime Minister: Otto B. Halvorsen
- Preceded by: Paal Berg
- Succeeded by: Lars Oftedal

Mayor of Trondheim
- In office 1 January 1911 – 31 December 1916
- Preceded by: Andreas Berg
- Succeeded by: Ole Konrad Ribsskog

Personal details
- Born: Odd Sverressøn Klingenberg; 8 June 1871 Trondheim, Sør-Trøndelag, Sweden-Norway
- Died: 3 November 1944 (aged 73) Trondheim, Norway
- Party: Conservative
- Spouse: Hulda Johannessen (m. 1896)
- Children: Leif; Sverre; Synnøve

Odd Sverressøn Klingenberg (8 June 1871 – 3 November 1944) was a Norwegian barrister and politician for the Conservative Party. He served as the Minister of Social Affairs 1920-1921, 1923 and 1923-1924 in addition to mayor of Trondheim 1911-1916.

He was born in Trondhjem as a son of attorney Sverre Olafssøn Klingenberg (1844–1913) and Hilda Johannesdatter Klingenberg (1843–1912). He was a brother of Sverre, Olav and Kaare Sverressøn Klingenberg and a grandson and grandnephew of engineer Johannes Benedictus Klingenberg.

Political offices
Preceded by Andreas Berg	Mayor of Trondheim; 1911–1916	Succeeded by Ole Konrad Ribsskog
Preceded by Paal Berg	Norwegian Minister of Social Affairs; 1920–1921	Succeeded by Lars Oftedal
Preceded by Rasmus Olai Mortensen	Norwegian Minister of Social Affairs; 1923–1924	Succeeded by Lars Oftedal
Preceded by Otto Bahr Halvorsen	Norwegian Minister of Justice and the Police (acting); March 1923–May 1923	Succeeded by Christian Lange Rolfsen
Preceded by Harald Bothner	County Governor of Sør-Trøndelag; 1921–1940	Succeeded by Johan Cappelen
