= Glacial survival hypothesis =

According to the northern cryptic glacial refugial hypothesis (or glacial survival hypothesis), during the last ice age cold tolerant plant and animal species (e.g. Norway spruce and Norwegian lemmings) persisted in ice-free microrefugia north of the Alps in Europe. The alternative hypothesis of no persistence and postglacial immigration of plants and animals from southern refugia in Europe (southern refugia paradigm) is sometimes also called the tabula rasa hypothesis.

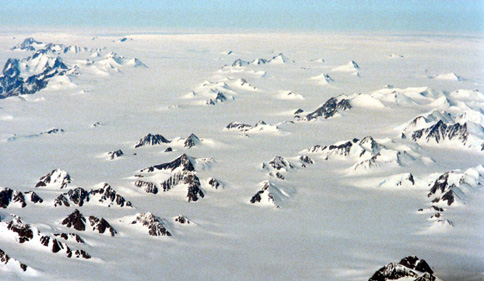
Nunatak mountains on the east coast of Greenland in the Amassalik area. Seen from 15.000ft altitude. July 1996, by Michael Haferkamp

Over the past plants and animals have persisted through long periods of climate change including several glacial and interglacial periods. There is a long-standing debate on what happened to the species that were inhabiting high-latitude regions during the Pleistocene ice age. Two main scenarios are usually considered. The first scenario proposes a total extinction of species within glaciated areas with survival events in peripheral refugia in the south and successive massive postglacial migration into empty areas (tabula rasa hypothesis). The second scenario proposes long-term in situ survival within glaciated regions (glacial survival hypothesis), either in isolated northern ice-free micro-refugia at the edge of the ice sheet, or on exposed mountains not covered with ice within the ice sheet (nunatak hypothesis).

For boreal and cold-tolerant species, evidence supporting glacial survival has been reported, although the extent and locations of northern glacial refugia remain debated, and molecular and phylogeographic studies have provided evidence consistent with glacial survival in both plant and animal species. Some of these interpretations have been debated, however, and alternative explanations for some of the genetic evidence have been proposed. Later research has provided a more complex picture for Norway spruce: ancient sedimentary DNA indicates an early presence in Fennoscandia following deglaciation, while genomic evidence suggests that some long-lived populations in central Sweden are more consistent with early postglacial migration from the east than with local glacial survival. Studies indicate that several northern regions (above latitudes >45° N) supported low-density boreal and temperate tree populations during the late-glacial or Early Holocene [e.g. North America, Eurasia, Alps, Scandinavia].

Several studies have combined lines of evidence coming from three major disciplines to infer the existence of past refugia: fossil records, species distribution models and molecular/phylogeographic surveys. In this way, it should be possible to better describe complex migration routes followed by species and populations in and out of refugia through time and space.

There has also been research to suggest that certain cold-tolerant tree species were able to survive the low temperatures thanks to the presence of a co-dependent beetle by the name of Gonioctena intermedia.

== See also ==
- Last Glacial Maximum refugia
- Refugium (population biology)
- Glacial refugium
