= Otto Kristian Hiorth =

Norwegian politician

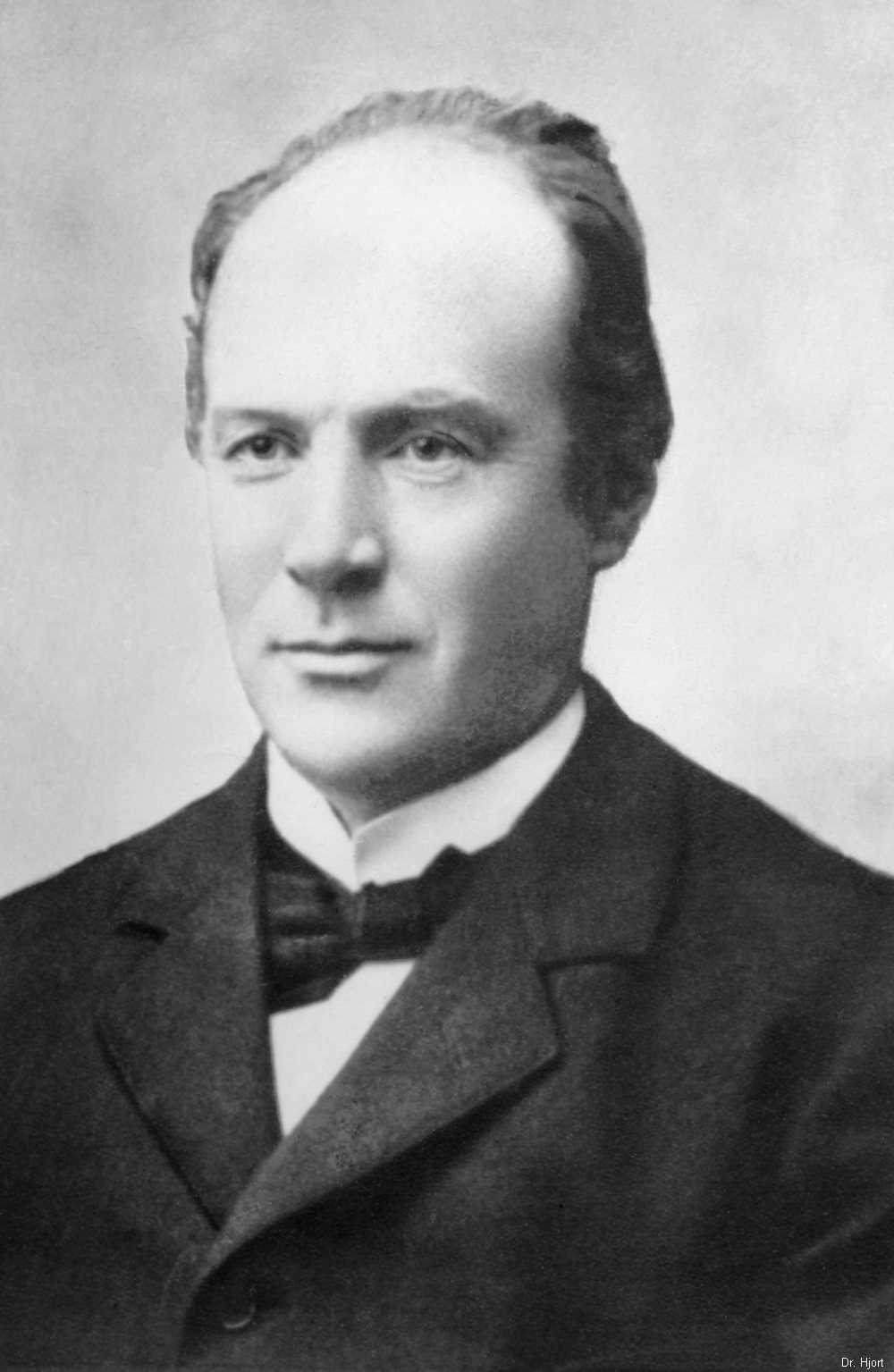
Otto Christian Hiorth, c. 1901

Otto Kristian Hiorth (8 November 1850 – 15 May 1906) was a Norwegian physician and politician for the Conservative Party.

Hiorth finished his secondary education in 1869 and graduated with the cand.med. degree in 1876. He worked as a physician in Vaage Municipality and Rakkestad Municipality before becoming district physician of Ytre Nordfjord in 1883. In 1892 he was hired in the same position in Levanger Municipality. Here, he was involved in municipal politics.

He was elected as a deputy representative to the Parliament of Norway from Trondhjem og Levanger in the 1903 Norwegian parliamentary election. He met in parliamentary session as a deputy in 1903, 1904 and lastly from 20 January 1906. This service ended abruptly when he died in Kristiania in May 1906.

Wrote Verdens Gang, Hiorth experienced sudden pain when entering the Parliament building. Bernhard Brænne helped him lie down on a couch in the parliament restaurant, where he was given a morphine injection by another member of Parliament who was also a physician, Gunnar Magnus Graarud. Hiorth regained a steady pulse and drove home, where he was also visited by Graarud and Brænne around dinner time. In the evening, Hiorth died in his apartment; Graarud and another physician Stoltenberg were summoned to no avail.
