= Claus Nissen Riiber Berg =

Norwegian businessman (1832–1915)

Claus Nissen Riiber Berg (22 June 1832 – 29 March 1915) was a Norwegian businessperson.

He was born in Aafjorden as a son of bailiff Johannes Berg and Margarethe Riiber. In 1866 he married Catharine Bygball Lund (1843–1914), daughter of the vogt in Ørlandet. Their daughter Margrethe married businessman and politician Francis Kjeldsberg, and their daughter Astrid married Ingvar Klingenberg.

After commercial education he settled in Trondhjem as a merchant from 1862. He was an "associé" in the company M. H. Lundgreens Enke, city council member, board member of the local bank and chairman and honorary member of the fisheries promotion association Trondhjems Fiskeriselskab. From 1877 he was a consular agent for the United States. He was also chairman and honorary member of the gymnastics club Trondhjems TF.

He was decorated as a Knight of the Order of Vasa and the Order of the Polar Star. He died in 1915.
