= Olaf Sverressøn Klingenberg =

Norwegian barrister and politician

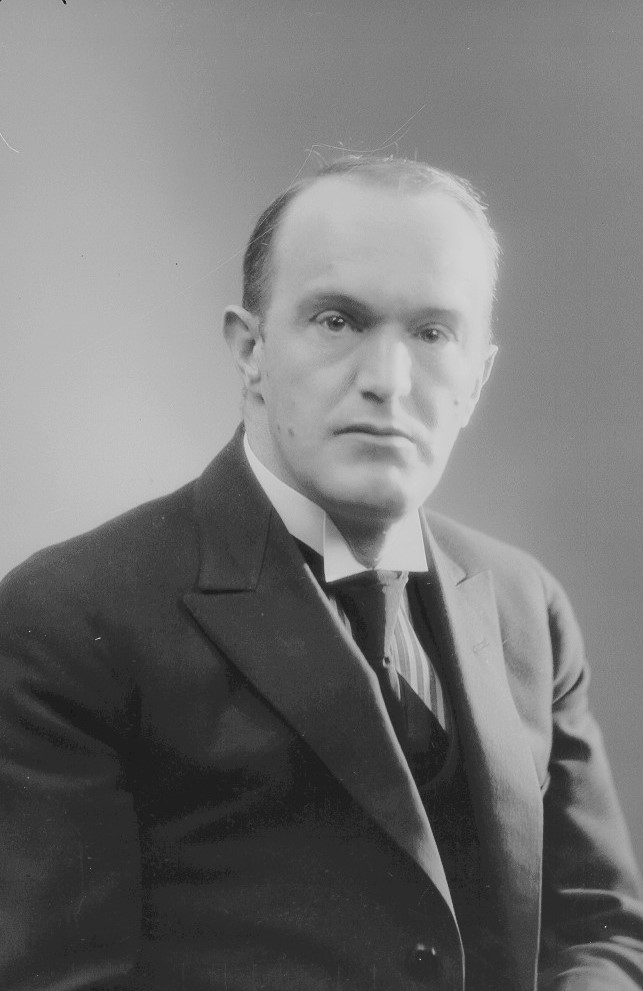

Olaf Sverressøn Klingenberg (14 August 1886 – 24 August 1968) was the Norwegian barrister and politician for the Conservative Party.

== Personal life ==
He was born in Strinda Municipality as a son of attorney Sverre Olafssøn Klingenberg (1844–1913) and Hilda Johannesdatter Klingenberg (1843–1912). He was a brother of Odd, Sverre and Kaare Sverressøn Klingenberg and a grandson and grandnephew of engineer Johannes Benedictus Klingenberg. In 1913 he married Hjørdis Bergland, daughter of a vicar.

== Career ==
He finished his secondary education in 1905 and graduated from the Royal Frederick University with the cand.jur. degree in 1910. He settled in Trondhjem as an attorney in 1918, as a partner in the law firm of his brother Odd. From 1922 he was a barrister with access to working with Supreme Court cases, as a law firm partner of attorney Borgersen until 1934. He was also a defender in the courts of appeal from 1922.

He represented the Conservative Party in the municipal council for Trondheim Municipality for many years starting in 1926. He served as deputy mayor from 1926 to 1928. He chaired the board of E. C. Dahls Bryggeri and the supervisory council of Nordenfjeldske Dampskibsselskab. He died in August 1968.
