= 1838 Norwegian parliamentary election =

- June–8 November 1838

All 99 seats in the Storting 50 seats needed for a majority
- Registered: 69,737
- Turnout: 50.17%
Prime Minister before election
Severin Løvenskiold
Prime Minister after election
Severin Løvenskiold

Parliamentary elections were held in Norway in 1838. As political parties were not officially established until 1884, all those elected were independents. The number of seats in the Storting was increased from 96 to 99. Voter turnout was 50.2%, although only 6% of the country's population was eligible to vote.

== Results ==
Of the 99 seats, 45 were won by civil servants, 35 by farmers, sheriffs, church singers and teachers and 19 by people with other professions.

Party	Votes	%	Seats
Independents			99
Total			99
Total votes	34,989	–	
Registered voters/turnout	69,737	50.17	
Source: Nohlen & Stöver, NSSDS
