= Sverre Sverressøn Klingenberg =

Norwegian politician (1882–1958)

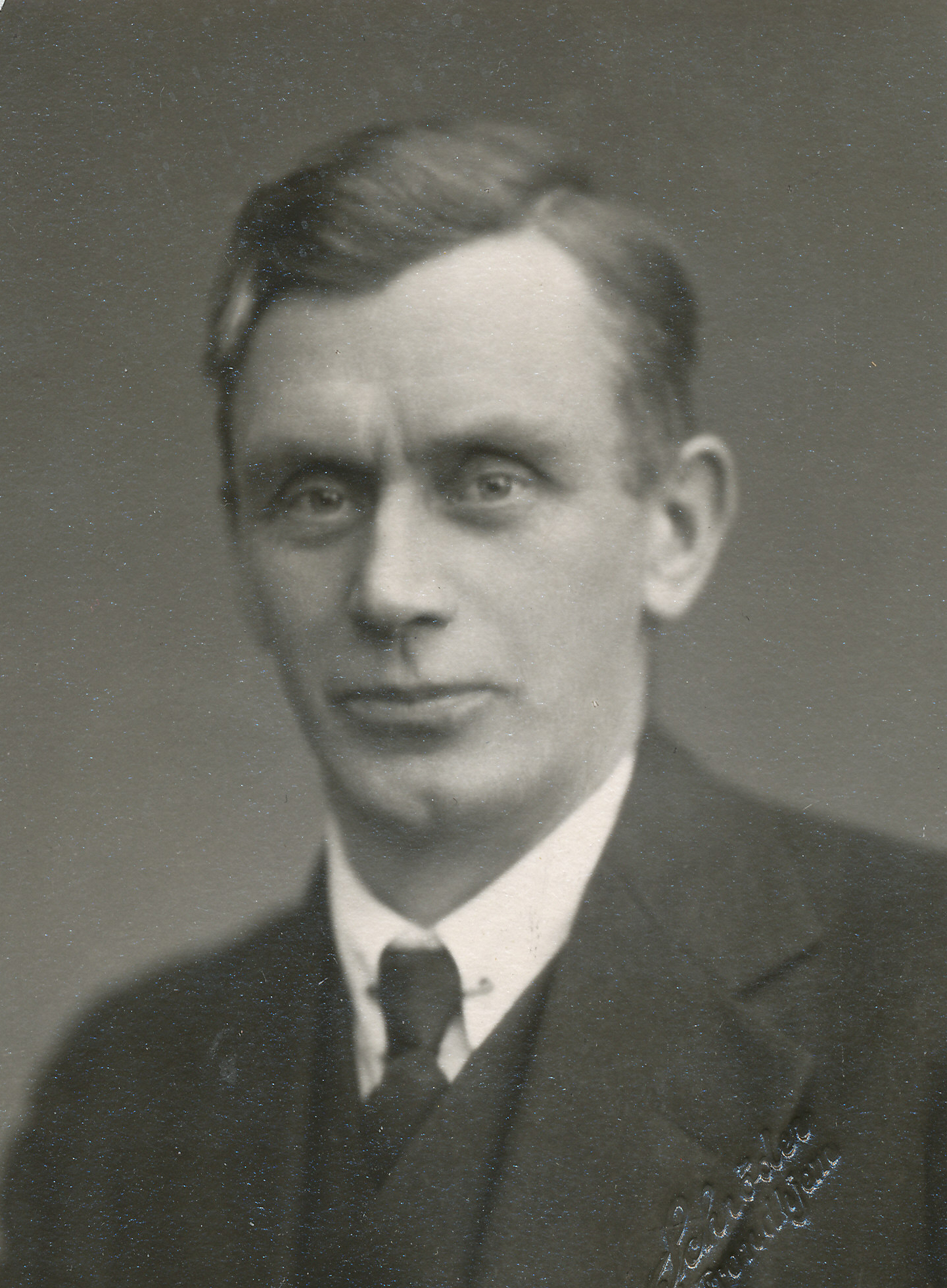
Sverre Klingenberg, c.1930.

Sverre Sverressøn Klingenberg (7 November 1882 – 1958) was the Norwegian engineer and politician for the Conservative Party.

== Personal life ==
He was born in Trondhjem as a son of attorney Sverre Olafssøn Klingenberg (1844–1913) and Hilda Johannesdatter Klingenberg (1843–1912). He was a brother of Odd, Olav and Kaare Sverressøn Klingenberg and a grandson and grandnephew of engineer Johannes Benedictus Klingenberg. In 1906 he married Ingeborg Halvorsdatter Kulseth (daughter of a tailor) in Selbu Municipality.

== Career ==
He attended Trondhjem Technical School from 1900 to 1902. After spending the following two years in America, he settled in Strinda Municipality in 1905. He was mainly an engineer and technical consultant, but also a farmer. From 1910 to 1914 he took further education, in construction engineering, at the new Norwegian Institute of Technology. He was then an assistant at the municipal engineer's office, and from 1918 he ran the factory Strindens Torvstrøfabrik. He continued as an engineering consultant by leading the construction of Strinda Hospital (1923–1924), the Trøndelag Art Exhibition (1929–1930), Trøndelag Travbane (1931) and Reitgjerdet Asylum (1932).

He was an elected member of the municipal council of Strinda Municipality from 1916 to 1922, serving as deputy mayor for the last three years. He was also a member of the school board for nine years. From 1924 to 1936 he was a member of the Conservative Party central board, and from 1927 to 1936 he chaired Sør-Trøndelag Conservative Party. In the 1930 Norwegian parliamentary election he was elected as a deputy representative to the Parliament of Norway from Sør-Trøndelag, serving the term 1931–1933. He was re-elected in 1933 to serve another term as a deputy.

He held a variety of board membership in the dairy industry in his homedistrict. He chaired Trondhjems Meieri (1923–1934), Trøndelag Melkesentral (from 1930) and Bøndernes Salgslag—and was a board member of the local savings bank (1925–1929), Meieribrukets Innkjøp and Norges Melkeprodusenters Landsforbund (from 1930). He died in 1958.
