= Tore Nordseth =

Norwegian politician (born 1966)

Tore Nordseth (born 14 February 1966 in Trondheim) is a Norwegian politician for the Labour Party.

He served as a deputy representative to the Norwegian Parliament from Sør-Trøndelag during the terms 1997–2001 and 2001–2005. From 2000 to 2001 he was a regular representative, covering for Trond Giske who was appointed to the Stoltenberg's First Cabinet.

Nordseth was a member of Trondheim city council from 1991 to 1995.
