= Knut Fagerbakke =

Norwegian politician (born 1952)

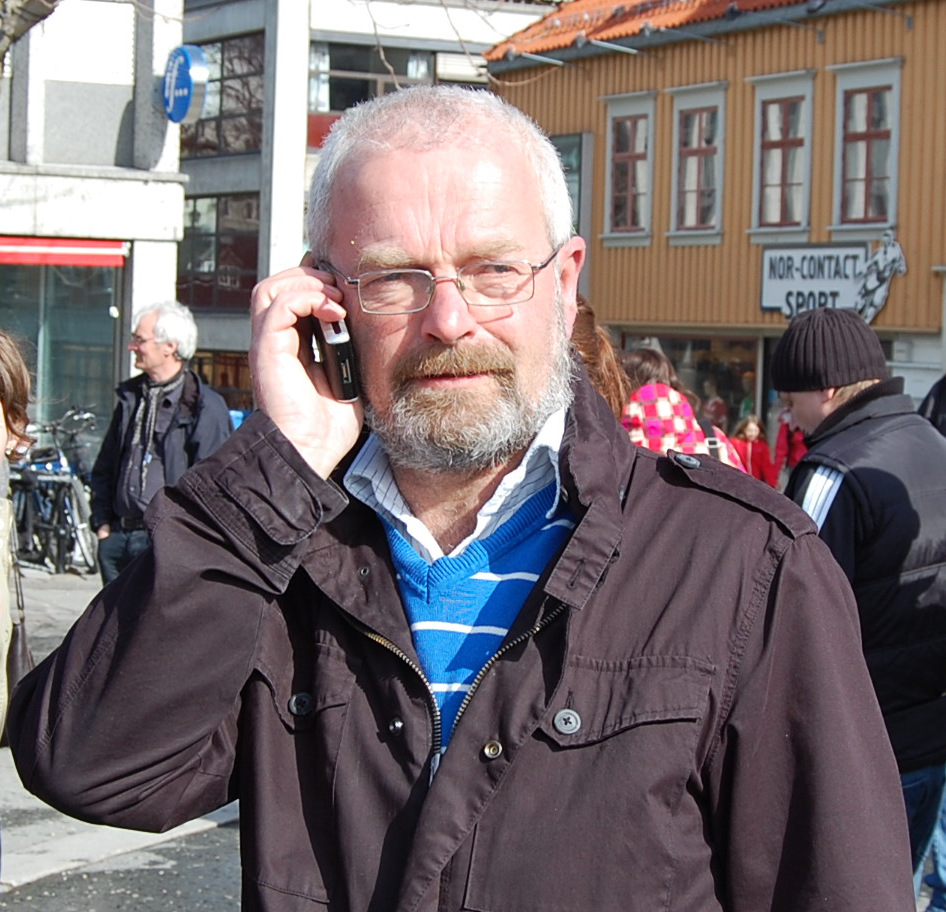
Knut Fagerbakke

Knut Fagerbakke (born 4 April 1952) is a Norwegian politician for the Socialist Left Party.

Since 2003 he is the deputy mayor of Trondheim.

Before becoming a full-time politician he worked as a consultant.
