= List of mayors of Trondheim =

Trondheim’s first female mayor

Mayors of Trondheim, the head of the municipal council of Trondheim Municipality in Trøndelag county, Norway.

Prior to 1963, the Trondheim Municipality was the same as the city of Trondheim. On 1 January 1964, Trondheim Municipality (the city) was merged with Strinda Municipality, Leinstrand Municipality, Tiller Municipality, and Byneset Municipality, creating a much larger Trondheim Municipality that included the city, its surrounding suburban areas, plus some rural areas. The list shows all the mayors of the smaller Trondheim prior to 1964 and then the mayors of the enlarged municipality since 1964. In 2020, Klæbu Municipality became part of Trondheim Municipality, further enlarging Trondheim.

== List ==
List of mayors of Trondheim Municipality:

Name	Party	Period	Notes
Jacob Roll		1838	
Balthazar Schnitler		1838	
Jacob Roll		1838–1839	
Balthazar Schnitler		1840–1841	
Jens Nicolai Jenssen		1842	
Samuel Severin Bætzmann		1843–1844	
Frederik Moltke Bugge		1845	
Hans Peter Jenssen, Sr.		1845–1846	
Jens Nicolai Jenssen		1847–1848	
Frederik Moltke Bugge		1849–1850	
Samuel Severin Bætzmann		1851–1856	
Johan Christian Grabow		1857	
Fredrik Georg Lerche		1858	
Hans Georg Colbjørnsen Meldahl		1859	
Christian Petersen		1860	
Einar Gram		1861	
Ove Guldberg Høegh, Jr.		1862	
Fritz Lorck		1863–1864	
Aage Schavland		1865	
Ove Christian Roll		1866	
Fritz Lorck		1867–1868	
Carl Arnoldus Müller		1869	
Fritz Lorck		1870	
Carl Arnoldus Müller		1871	
Christian Worm Sommerschield Hirsch		1872–1873	
Johannes Musæus Nissen		1873–1877	
Christian Hulbert Hielm		1878	
Christian Worm Sommerschield Hirsch		1879–1882	
Jens Ludvig Paul Flor		1883–1884	
Karl Ludvig Tørrisen Bugge		1885	
Christian Hulbert Hielm		1886	
Johan Bergh		1887	
Marius Frimann Dahl Bøckman		1888	
Bernhard Konrad Bergersen		1889–1890	
Ingebrigt Buaas		1891–1892	
Sverre Olafssøn Klingenberg		1893–1894	
Carl Nielsen		1895	
Christian Knudtzon Schaanning		1896	
Bernhard Konrad Bergersen		1897–1898	
Andreas Berg	Conservative	1899–1901	
Hans Jørgen Bauck	Conservative	1902–1904	
Christian Thaulow	Conservative	1905–1907	
Andreas Berg	Conservative	1908–1910	
Odd Sverressøn Klingenberg	Conservative	1911–1916	
Ole Konrad Ribsskog	Labour	1917–1919	
Einar Dahl	Conservative	1920–1921	
Francis Kjeldsberg	Conservative	1922–1922	
Kristian Bryn	Liberal Left	1923–1925	
Andreas Moe	Conservative	1926–1930	
Johan Cappelen	Liberal Left	1931–1934	
Ivar Skjånes	Labour	1935–1940	
Olav Bergan	National Unification	1940–1943	Installed by Nazi Germany
Sverre Colbjørnsen Stokstad	National Unification	1943–1945	Installed by Nazi Germany
Ivar Skjånes	Labour	1945–1952	
John Aae	Labour	1952–1958	
Olav Gjærevoll	Labour	1958–1963	
Odd Sagør	Labour	1963–1970	
Kaare Tønne	Labour	1970–1975	
Axel Buch	Conservative	1976–1979	
Olav Gjærevoll	Labour	1980–1981	
Anne Kathrine Parow	Labour	1982–1984	
Per Berge	Labour	1985–1989	
Marvin Wiseth	Conservative	1990–1998	
Anne Kathrine Slungård	Conservative	1998–2003	
Liv Sandven	Christian Democrat	2001–2002	Acting
Rita Ottervik	Labour	2003–2023	
Kent Ranum	Conservative	2023–present	
