= Norwegian Hospital and Health Service Association =

- Logo
- Native name: Norsk sykehus- og helsetjenesteforening
- Company type: Interest organisation
- Founded: 1937 in Norway
- Headquarters: Nedre Slottsgate, Oslo, Norway
- Key people: Erik K. Normann
- Website: nsh.no

The Norwegian Hospital and Health Service Association (Norwegian: Norsk sykehus- og helsetjenesteforening) is an interest organisation in Norway.

It was founded as the Norwegian Hospital Association in 1937. It is a member body of the International Hospital Federation and the European Association of Hospital Managers. It organizes health trusts, health service bodies of municipalities, private hospitals, health education institutions, patient organizations, health utility suppliers and interested people.

The Chairman of the Board is Erik K. Normann, secretary-general is May Britt Buhaug and the organizational headquarters are in Nedre Slottsgate in Oslo.
