= Henry Thingstad =

Norwegian sports official and communist resistance member

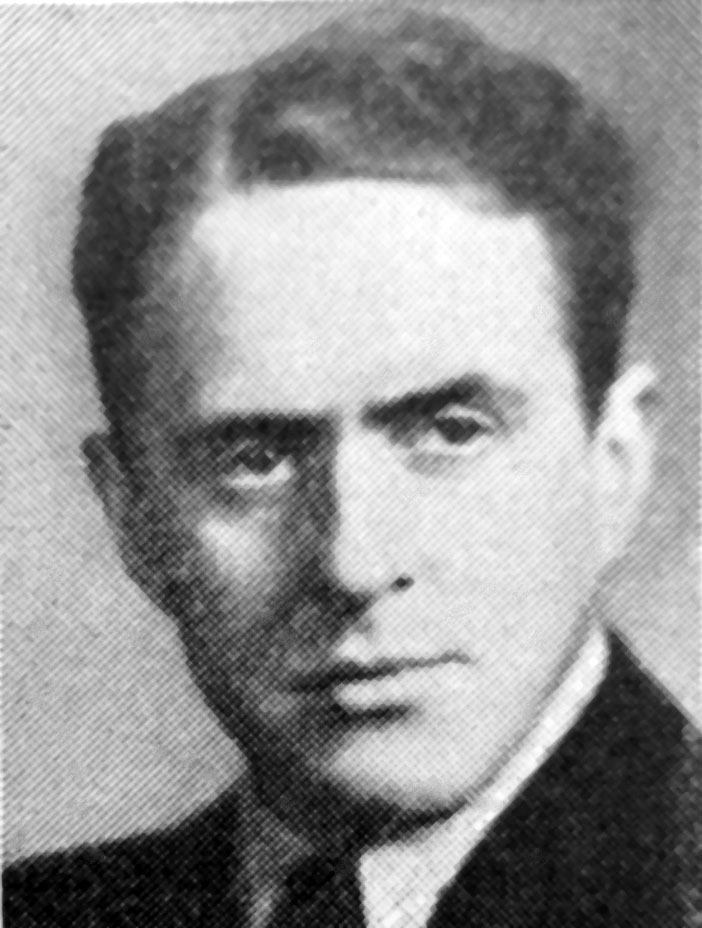
- Born: April 9, 1916; Trondheim, Norway
- Died: May 19, 1943 (aged 27); Kristiansten Fortress, Trøndelag County, Norway
- Cause of death: Execution by firing squad
- Resting place: Nidaros Cathedral, Trondheim
- Occupations: Watchmaker, sports official, politician
- Political party: Communist Party of Norway (1931-)

Henry Thingstad (9 April 1916 – 19 May 1943) was a Norwegian sports official and communist resistance member.

He was born in Trondhjem to a mother from Skogn Municipality and a father from Tynset Municipality. Both died before Thingstad turned twenty. He was a watchmaker by profession. Before the Second World War he was active in the workers' sports club Arbeidernes TF and the Workers' Confederation of Sports. He chaired the district workers' sports organization in Sør-Trøndelag from 1938 to 1940. He also chaired the workers' sports club SK Ørnulf. In 1939 he supported the merger between the workers' and bourgeois sports organizations, in order to create a unity front against fascism.

He had been a member of the Young Communist League of Norway since 1931. During the occupation of Norway by Nazi Germany, Thingstad was one of the first to participate in the Norwegian resistance movement in Trøndelag, with the "Thingstad Group". His resistance activity was communist by nature, spurred by the banning of the Communist Party of Norway in August 1940. The Nazis had an active provocateur and infiltrator in Trøndelag, Henry Rinnan, who managed to unveil most of the communist resistance leaders in the district in October and November 1941. Thingstad had then participated in a failed assassination attempt on Rinnan. From early 1942 Thingstad became a part of the district leadership and underground central committee of the Communist Party.

Thingstad was captured in February 1943 after involvement from Rinnan. He was subjected to torture. He was imprisoned in Vollan concentration camp. A German court-martial sentenced him to death on 4 May 1943, and he was executed at Kristiansten Fortress together with ten other people on 19 May. His body was not disposed of, but buried in the Nidaros Cathedral graveyard. Tore Pryser's book Klassen og nasjonen 1935-1946 featured a goodbye letter Thingstad wrote in his cell.
