= Trondheim District Court =

Former district court in Trondheim, Norway

- Trondheim tingrett
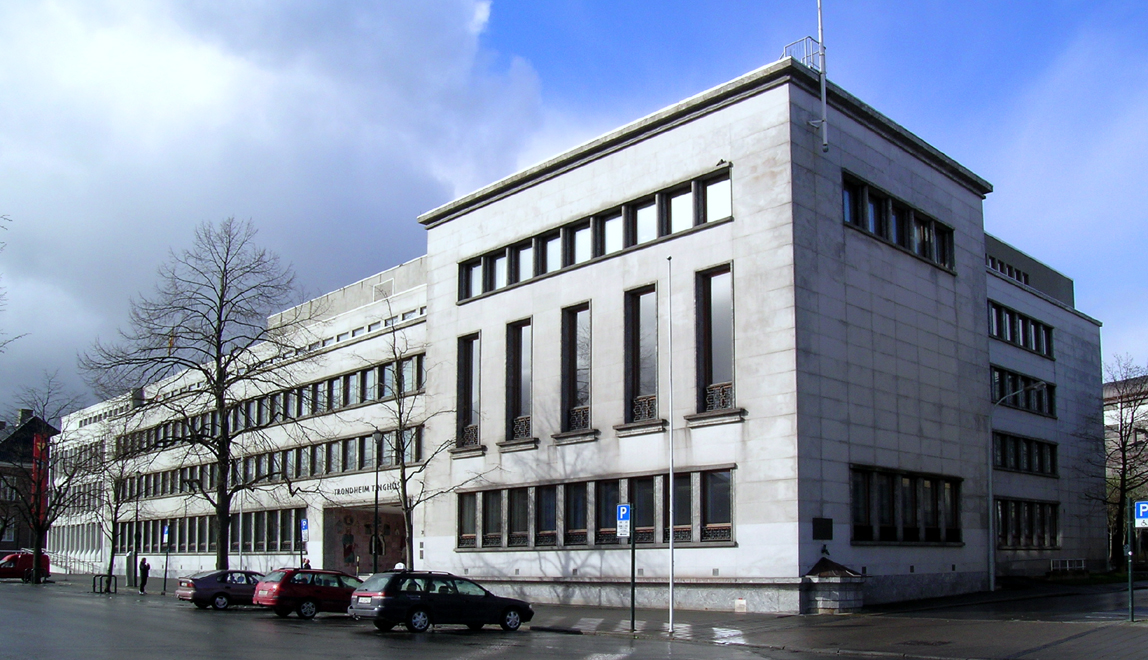
- Trondheim Courthouse
- 63°25′46″N 10°23′41″E
- Dissolved: 1 Jan 2010
- Jurisdiction: Trondheim
- Location: Trondheim, Norway
- Coordinates: 63°25′46″N 10°23′41″E
- Appeals to: Frostating Court of Appeal

Trondheim District Court (Norwegian: Trondheim tingrett, previously Trondheim byrett) was a district court located in and serving the city of Trondheim in Sør-Trøndelag county, Norway. Cases from this court could be appealed to Frostating Court of Appeal.

The court was a court of first instance. Its judicial duties were mainly to settle criminal cases and to resolve civil litigation as well as bankruptcy. The administration and registration tasks of the court included death registration, issuing certain certificates, performing duties of a notary public, and officiating civil wedding ceremonies. Cases from this court were heard by a combination of professional judges and lay judges.

== History ==
On 1 January 2010, this court was closed and its jurisdiction was transferred to the Sør-Trøndelag District Court, which was located in the same building.
