= Harald Pedersen =

Norwegian metallurgist and politician

Harald Christian Pedersen
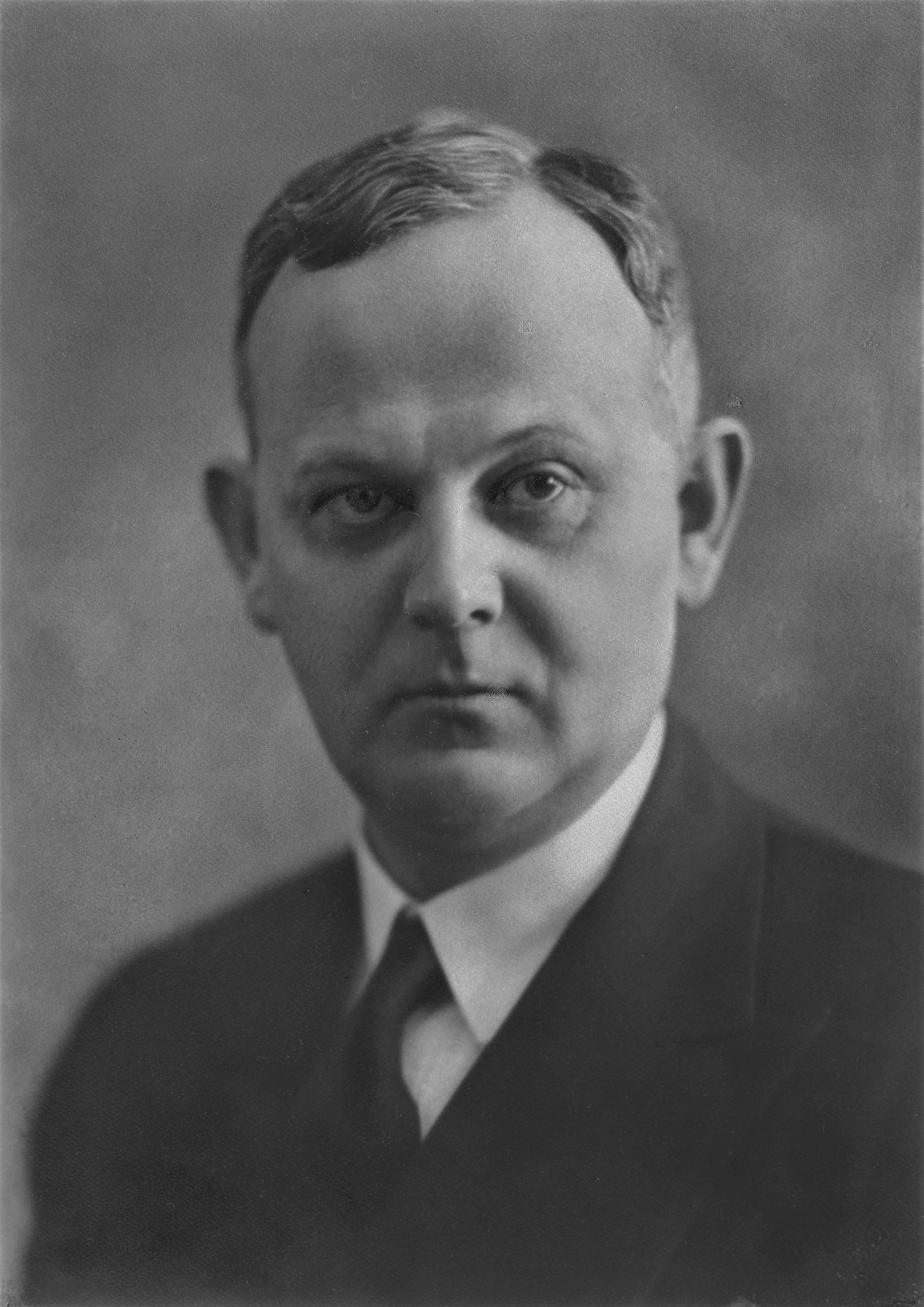
- Born: 16 January 1888; Strinda, Norway
- Died: 17 January 1945 (aged 57); Trondheim
- Occupations: Metallurgist; Industrialist
- Relatives: Sverre Pedersen (brother); Marie Pedersen (sister); Einar Sverre Pedersen (nephew)

Harald Christian Pedersen (16 January 1888 – 17 January 1945) was a Norwegian metallurgist.

He was born in Strinda Municipality to sailor Hans Martinius Pedersen and Christine Elisabeth Andersen, and was a brother of architect Sverre Pedersen and pedagogue Marie Pedersen. He married Aasta Rollaug Rønning in 1913.

Pedersen was appointed professor of metallurgy at the Norwegian Institute of Technology from 1920 to 1944. He was also rector of the institution from 1925 to 1929. He was also strongly involved at the Røros Copper Works, where he worked from 1912 to 1915, and later as chairman of the board and a major shareholder. Pedersen was a member of the Fascist party Nasjonal Samling, and collaborated with the Germans during the German occupation of Norway.

He invented the Pedersen process of refining aluminum in the 1920s which was used in Norway for over 40 years before shutting down due to it being less economically competitive than the Bayer process.
