= Kolstad's Cabinet =

Government of Norway from 1931 to 1932

- Cabinet of Norway

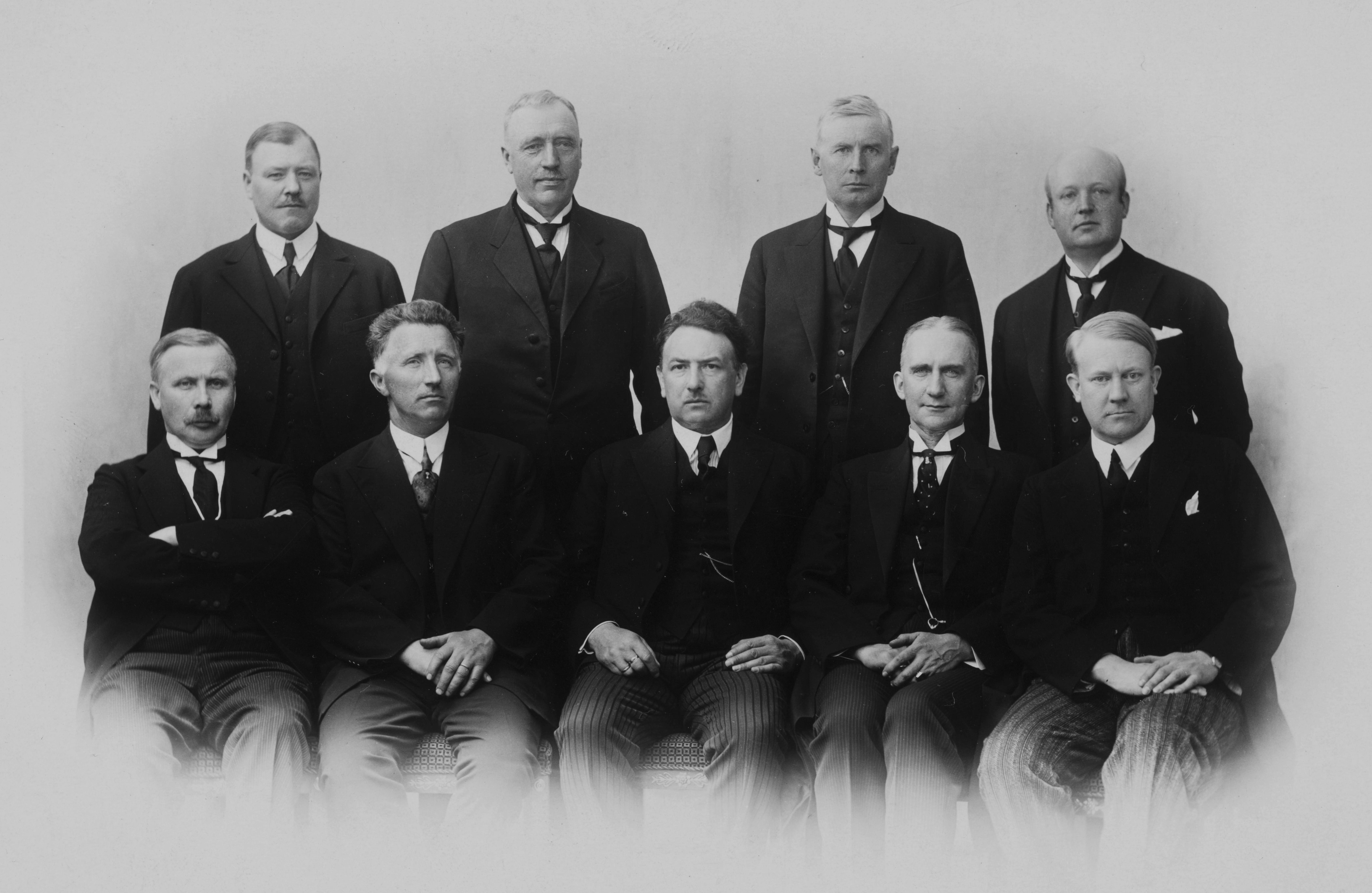
- The cabinet in 1931. From left to right: Foreign Minister Birger Braadland, Education Minister Nils Trædal, Prime Minister Peder Kolstad, Justice Minister Asbjørn Lindboe, Defence Minister Vidkun Quisling, Trade Minister Per Larssen, Labour Minister Rasmus Langeland, Agriculture Minister Jon Sundby and Social Affairs Minister Jakob Vik.
- Date established: 12 May 1931
- Date dissolved: 14 March 1932

Leadership and composition
- Head of state: Haakon VII of Norway
- Head of government: Peder Kolstad
- Total no. of members: 10
- Member party: Agrarian Party
- Status in legislature: Minority government

Formation and history
- Legislature term: 1931–1934
- Predecessor: Mowinckel's Second Cabinet
- Successor: Hundseid's Cabinet

Kolstad's Cabinet governed Norway from 12 May 1931 to 14 March 1932. The Agrarian Party cabinet was led by Prime Minister Peder Kolstad.

== Cabinet members ==
Portfolio	Minister	Took office	Left office	Party
Prime Minister	Peder Kolstad	12 May 1931	14 March 1932	Farmers'
Minister of Foreign Affairs	Birger Braadland	12 May 1931	14 March 1932	Farmers'
Minister of Defence	Vidkun Quisling	12 May 1931	14 March 1932	Independent
Minister of Finance	Peder Kolstad	12 May 1931	1 February 1932	Farmers'
Minister of Finance	Jon Sundby	1 February 1932	14 March 1932	Farmers'
Minister of Trade	Per Larssen	12 May 1931	14 March 1932	Farmers'
Minister of Labour	Rasmus Olsen Langeland	12 May 1931	14 March 1932	Farmers'
Minister of Justice and the Police	Asbjørn Lindboe	12 May 1931	14 March 1932	Farmers'
Minister of Social Affairs	Jakob Nilsson Vik	12 May 1931	14 March 1932	Farmers'
Minister of Agriculture	Jon Sundby	12 May 1931	25 February 1932	Farmers'
Minister of Agriculture	Ivar Kirkeby-Garstad	25 February 1932	14 March 1932	Farmers'
Minister of Education and Church Affairs	Nils Trædal	12 May 1931	14 March 1932	Farmers'
