= Minister of Agriculture and Food (Norway) =

Norwegian government minister

Minister of Agriculture and Food of Norway
- Landbruks- og matministeren

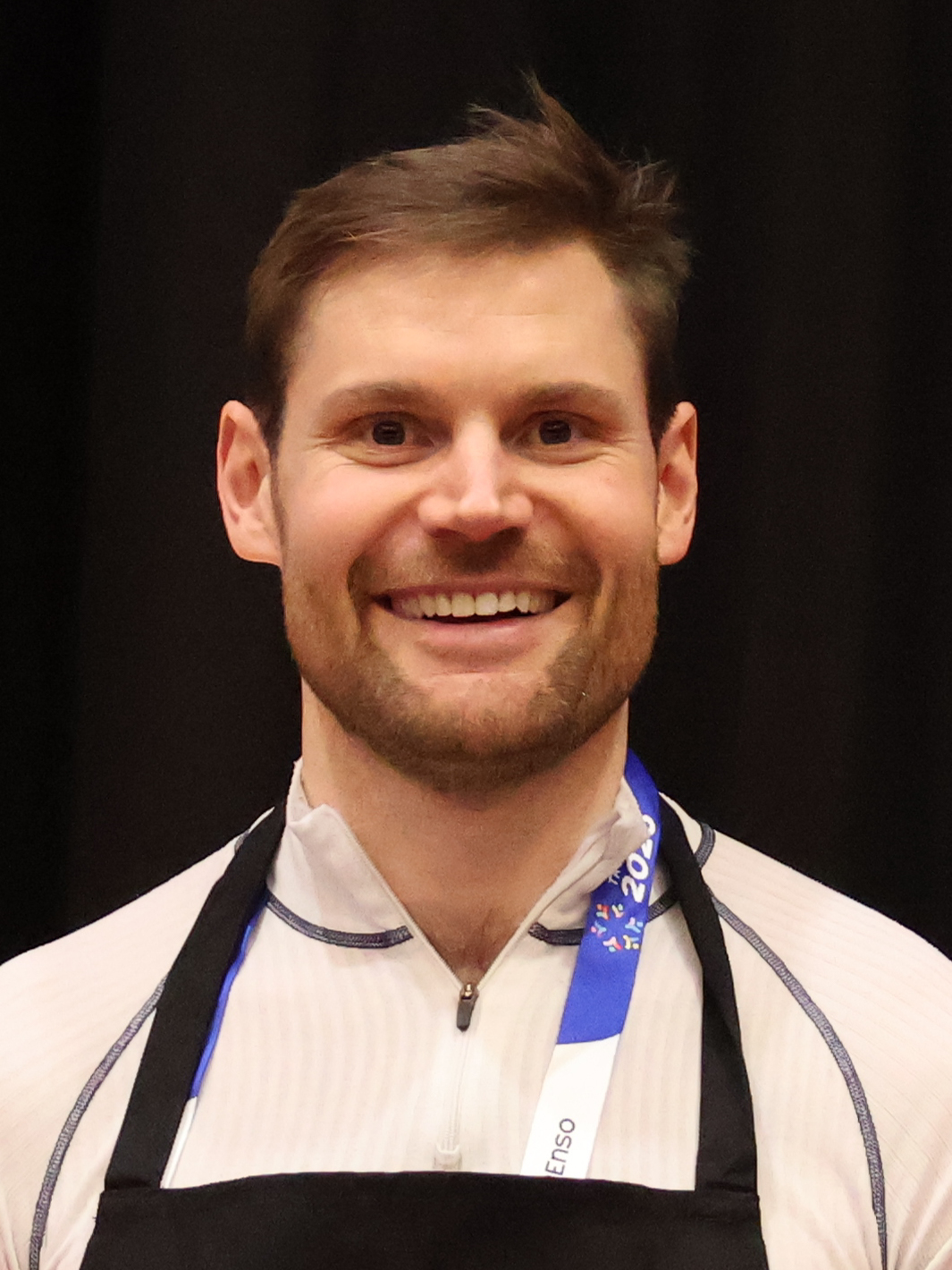
- Incumbent; Nils Kristen Sandtrøen since 4 February 2025
- Ministry of Foreign Affairs
- Member of: Council of State
- Seat: Oslo
- Nominator: Prime Minister
- Appointer: Monarch with approval of Parliament
- Term length: No fixed length
- Constituting instrument: Constitution of Norway
- Precursor: Minister of the Interior
- Formation: 31 March 1900
- First holder: Ole Anton Qvam
- Deputy: State secretaries at the Ministry of Agriculture and Food
- Website: Official website

The Minister of Agriculture and Food (Norwegian: Landbruks- og matministeren) is a councillor of state and chief of the Norway's Ministry of Agriculture and Food. The ministry is responsible for issues related to agriculture, forestry and food. Major subordinate agencies include the Norwegian Agriculture Authority, the Norwegian Food Safety Authority and Statskog. The position was created on 31 March 1900, along with the ministry, and Ole Anton Qvam was the inaugural officeholder. Fifty people from eight parties have held the office. During the German occupation of Norway from 1940 to 1945, the office was both held by a German puppet government and an elected government in London.

Until 2004 the position was known as the Minister of Agriculture. The longest-serving officeholder is Hans Ystgaard, who served for more than ten years under Prime Minister Johan Nygaardsvold, who himself holds the shortest tenure, of sixteen days. Gunhild Øyangen has served for more than nine years, and was also the first female to hold the position; while Gunnar Knudsen held it for more than eight, both in the course of two terms. Håkon Five has been appointed a record four times, serving for nearly five years. Jens Hundseid served in the office while being Prime Minister.

The current minister is Nils Kristen Sandtrøen, who assumed the position in 2025.

== Ministers ==
The following lists the minister, their party, date of assuming and leaving office, their tenure in years and days, and the cabinet they served in.

Parties
Agrarian / Centre Party
Christian Democratic Party
Conservative Party
Free-minded Liberal Party
Independent
Labour Party
Liberal Party
Moderate Liberal Party
National Unification
Progress Party

=== Ministers ===
Photo	Name	Party	Took office	Left office	Tenure	Cabinet	Ref
	Ole Anton Qvam	Liberal	1 April 1900	6 November 1900	219 days	Steen II	
	Wollert Konow (H)	Liberal	6 November 1900	8 June 1903	2 years, 214 days	Steen II; Blehr I	
	Gunnar Knudsen	Liberal	9 June 1903	22 October 1903	135 days	Blehr I	
	Christian Mathiesen	Conservative	22 October 1903	26 September 1904	340 days	Hagerup II	
	Johan E. Mellbye	Conservative	26 September 1904	11 March 1905	166 days	Hagerup II	
	Aasmund Halvorsen Vinje	Moderate Liberal	11 March 1905	6 November 1906	1 year, 240 days	Michelsen	
	Sven Aarrestad	Liberal	6 November 1906	19 March 1908	1 year, 134 days	Michelsen; Løvland	
	Hans Konrad Foosnæs	Liberal	19 March 1908	2 February 1910	1 year, 320 days	Knudsen I	
	Wollert Konow (SB)	Free-minded Liberal	2 February 1910	1 March 1910	27 days	Konow	
	Bernt Holtsmark	Free-minded Liberal	1 March 1910	20 February 1912	1 year, 356 days	Konow	
	Erik Enge	Free-minded Liberal	20 February 1912	31 January 1913	346 days	Bratlie	
	Gunnar Knudsen	Liberal	31 January 1913	12 December 1919	6 years, 315 days	Knudsen II	
	Håkon Five	Liberal	12 December 1919	21 June 1920	192 days	Knudsen II	
	Gunder Anton Jahren	Conservative	21 June 1920	22 June 1921	1 year, 1 day	Bahr Halvorsen I	
	Martin Olsen Nalum	Liberal	22 June 1921	26 July 1921	34 days	Blehr II	
	Håkon Five	Liberal	26 July 1921	6 March 1923	1 year, 223 days	Blehr II	
	Anders Venger	Conservative	6 March 1923	25 July 1924	1 year, 141 days	Bahr Halvorsen II; Berge	
	Håkon Five	Liberal	25 July 1924	5 March 1926	1 year, 223 days	Mowinckel I	
	Ole Bærøe	Conservative	5 March 1926	28 January 1928	1 year, 323 days	Lykke	
	Johan Nygaardsvold	Labour	28 January 1928	15 February 1928	18 days	Hornsrud	
	Hans Jørgensen Aarstad	Liberal	15 February 1928	12 May 1931	3 years, 86 days	Mowinckel II	
	Jon Sundby	Agrarian	12 May 1931	25 February 1932	289 days	Kolstad	
	Ivar Kirkeby-Garstad	Agrarian	25 February 1932	14 March 1932	18 days	Kolstad	
	Jens Hundseid	Agrarian	14 March 1932	3 March 1933	354 days	Hundseid	
	Håkon Five	Liberal	3 March 1933	20 March 1935	2 years, 17 days	Mowinckel III	
—	Hans Ystgaard	Labour	20 March 1935	25 June 1945	10 years, 97 days	Nygaardsvold	
—	Tormod Hustad	National Unification	9 April 1940	15 April 1940	6 days	Quisling I	
—	Rasmus Mork	Independent	15 April 1940	25 September 1940	163 days	Administrative Council	
—	Thorstein Fretheim	National Unification	25 September 1940	21 April 1945	4 years, 208 days	Terboven; Quisling II	
—	Trygve Dehli Laurantzon	National Unification	21 April 1945	8 May 1945	17 days	Quisling II	
	Einar Frogner	Agrarian	25 June 1945	5 November 1945	133 days	Gerhardsen I	
	Kristian Fjeld	Labour	5 November 1945	19 November 1951	6 years, 14 days	Gerhardsen II	
—	Rasmus Nordbø	Labour	19 November 1951	22 January 1955	3 years, 64 days	Torp	
	Olav Meisdalshagen	Labour	22 January 1955	14 May 1956	1 year, 113 days	Gerhardsen III	
	Harald Johan Løbak	Labour	14 May 1956	24 April 1960	3 years, 346 days	Gerhardsen III	
—	Einar Wøhni	Labour	24 April 1960	28 August 1963	3 years, 126 days	Gerhardsen III	
—	Hans Borgen	Centre	28 August 1963	25 September 1963	28 days	Lyng	
—	Leif Granli	Labour	25 September 1963	12 October 1965	2 years, 17 days	Gerhardsen IV	
-	Bjarne Lyngstad	Liberal	12 October 1965	21 August 1970	4 years, 313 days	Borten	
–	Hallvard Eika	Liberal	21 August 1970	17 March 1971	208 days	Borten	
–	Thorstein Treholt	Labour	17 March 1971	18 October 1972	1 year, 215 days	Bratteli I	
	Einar Moxnes	Centre	18 October 1972	16 October 1973	363 days	Korvald	
–	Thorstein Treholt	Labour	16 October 1973	15 January 1976	2 years, 91 days	Bratteli II	
—	Oskar Øksnes	Labour	15 January 1976	14 October 1981	5 years, 272 days	Nordli; Brundtland I	
—	Johan C. Løken	Conservative	14 October 1981	8 June 1983	1 year, 237 days	Willoch I	
—	Finn T. Isaksen	Centre	8 June 1983	4 October 1985	2 years, 118 days	Willoch II	
—	Svein Sundsbø	Centre	4 October 1985	9 May 1986	217 days	Willoch II	
—	Gunhild Øyangen	Labour	9 May 1986	16 October 1989	3 years, 160 days	Brundtland II	
—	Anne Vik	Centre	16 October 1989	3 November 1990	1 year, 18 days	Syse	
—	Gunhild Øyangen	Labour	3 November 1990	25 October 1996	5 years, 357 days	Brundtland III	
	Dag Terje Andersen	Labour	25 October 1996	17 October 1997	357 days	Jagland	
	Kåre Gjønnes	Christian Democratic	17 October 1997	17 March 2000	2 years, 152 days	Bondevik I	
	Bjarne Håkon Hanssen	Labour	17 March 2000	19 October 2001	1 year, 216 days	Stoltenberg I	
	Lars Sponheim	Liberal	19 October 2001	17 October 2005	3 years, 364 days	Bondevik II	
	Terje Riis-Johansen	Centre	17 October 2005	20 June 2008	2 years, 247 days	Stoltenberg II	
	Lars Peder Brekk	Centre	20 June 2008	18 June 2012	3 years, 364 days	Stoltenberg II	
	Trygve Slagsvold Vedum	Centre	18 June 2012	16 October 2013	1 year, 120 days	Stoltenberg II	
	Sylvi Listhaug	Progress	16 October 2013	16 December 2015	2 years, 61 days	Solberg	
	Jon Georg Dale	Progress	16 December 2015	31 August 2018	2 years, 258 days	Solberg	
	Bård Hoksrud	Progress	31 August 2018	22 January 2019	145 days	Solberg	
	Olaug Bollestad	Christian Democratic	22 January 2019	14 October 2021	2 years, 265 days	Solberg	
	Sandra Borch	Centre	14 October 2021	4 August 2023	1 year, 294 days	Støre	
	Geir Pollestad	Centre	4 August 2023	4 February 2025	1 year, 184 days	Støre	
	Nils Kristen Sandtrøen	Labour	4 February 2025	present	1 year, 215 days	Støre	
