= Birger Braadland =

Norwegian politician (1879–1966)

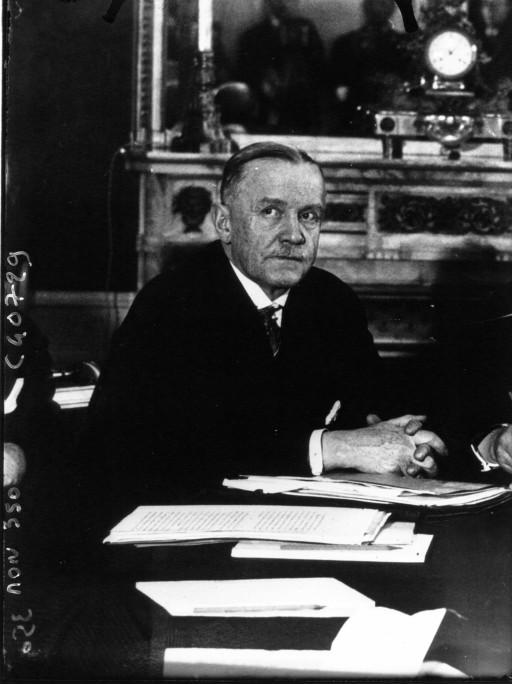

Minister of Foreign Affairs
- In office 12 May 1931 – 3 March 1933
- Prime Minister: Peder Kolstad; Jens Hundseid
- Preceded by: J. L. Mowinckel
- Succeeded by: J. L. Mowinckel

Prime Minister of Norway Acting
- In office 10 March 1932 – 13 March 1932
- Preceded by: Peder Kolstad
- Succeeded by: Jens Hundseid
- In office 1 February 1932 – 29 February 1932
- Preceded by: Peder Kolstad
- Succeeded by: Peder Kolstad

Member of the Norwegian Parliament
- In office 1 January 1934 – 31 December 1936
- Constituency: Østfold

Personal details
- Born: 26 January 1879 Idd, Østfold, Sweden-Norway
- Died: 15 January 1966 (aged 86) Idd, Østfold, Norway
- Party: Agrarian
- Spouse: Ragna Abigael Vogt Stang (m. 1902)
- Occupation: Politician

Birger Braadland (26 January 1879 in Idd, Norway – 15 January 1966 in Idd, Norway) was a Norwegian politician for the Agrarian Party. He served as foreign minister from 1931 to 1933.

== Life ==
He started his career as a professional officer but retired from the army in 1919 to become a forester. He was Minister for Foreign Affairs for the Kolstad cabinet of 1931-1932 and the Hundseid cabinet of 1932–1933. Towards the end of the Kolstad cabinet, he was briefly also acting prime minister in 1932. Though his tenure was brief, he was forced to deal with a dispute with Denmark over Greenland. He was also a marked opponent of fellow cabinet member Vidkun Quisling.

After the fall of the government, Braadland became a member of the Norwegian parliament. He sat for Østfold from 1934 to 1936, and as deputy representative from 1937 to 1945. He also served on the Norwegian Nobel Committee from 1938 to 1948. His son Erik Braadland later became a member of Parliament.
