= Kirkeby =

Kirkeby may refer to:

== People with the surname ==
- Arnold Kirkeby (1901–1962), American hotelier and real estate investor
- Ed Kirkeby (1891–1978), American musician and manager
- Gilbert Kirkeby, MP
- Ingunn Rise Kirkeby (born 1961), Norwegian handball player
- Ivar Kirkeby-Garstad (1877–1951), Norwegian politician
- John Kirkeby, English cleric in the 15th century
- Lars Reidulv Kirkeby-Garstad (1907–1977), Norwegian politician
- Mark Kirkeby (born 1960), American politician
- Ole Fogh Kirkeby (born 1947), Danish philosopher
- Paula Kirkeby (1934–2016), American art gallery owner, art collector, fine art printing press owner and director
- Per Kirkeby (1938–2018), Danish painter
- William de Kirkeby, English cleric in the 13th century

== Other ==
- Kirkeby, Denmark, town
- Kirkeby–Over Stadium, a stadium in South Dakota, US
- Sønder Kirkeby Runestone, ancient stone
