= Ivar Kirkeby-Garstad =

Norwegian politician

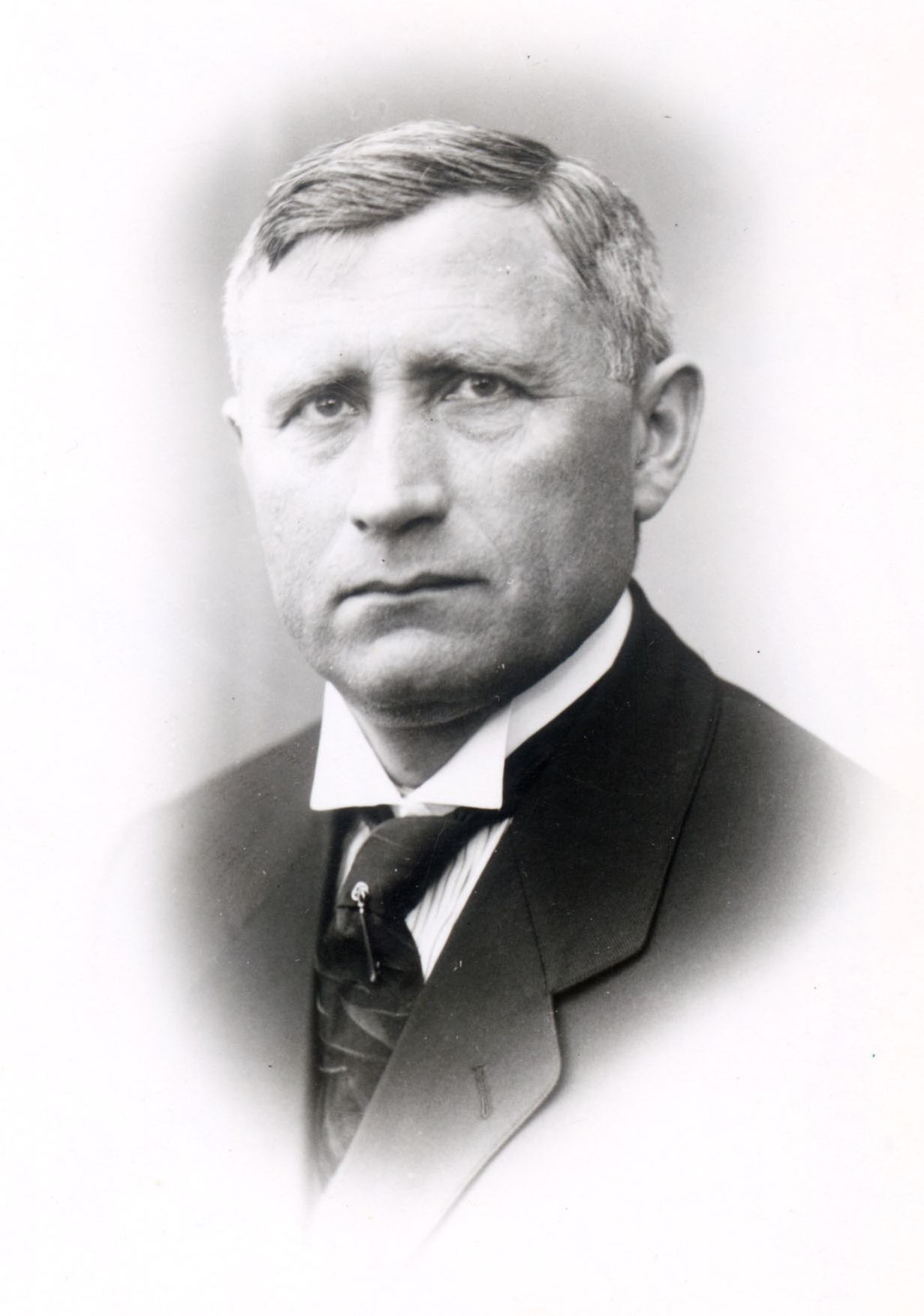

Minister of Trade
- In office 14 March 1932 – 3 March 1933
- Prime Minister: Jens Hundseid
- Preceded by: Per Larssen
- Succeeded by: Lars O. Meling

Minister of Agriculture Acting
- In office 25 February 1932 – 14 March 1932
- Prime Minister: Peder Kolstad; Jens Hundseid
- Preceded by: Jon Sundby
- Succeeded by: Jens Hundseid

Member of the Norwegian Parliament
- In office 1 January 1922 – 4 December 1945
- Constituency: Nord-Trøndelag

Personal details
- Born: Ivar Larsen Kirkeby-Garstad; 5 August 1877 Vikna Municipality, Nord-Trøndelag, Sweden-Norway
- Died: 19 June 1951 (aged 73) Vikna, Nord-Trøndelag, Norway
- Party: Agrarian
- Children: Lars Kirkeby-Garstad

Ivar Larsen Kirkeby-Garstad (5 August 1877 – 19 June 1951) was a Norwegian politician for the Agrarian Party.

He was elected to the Parliament of Norway from Nord-Trøndelag in 1921, and was re-elected on five consecutive occasions. He last served as a deputy representative during the term 1945–1949. He was also acting Minister of Agriculture from February to March 1932 in Kolstad's Cabinet, and Minister of Trade, Shipping, Industry, Craft and Fisheries from March 1932 to March 1933 in Hundseid's Cabinet.

He was the father of politician Lars Reidulv Kirkeby-Garstad.

Political offices
Preceded by Jon Sundby	Minister of Agriculture (acting); February 1932–March 1932	Succeeded by Jens Hundseid
Preceded by Per Larssen	Minister of Trade; March 1932–1933	Succeeded by Lars O. Meling
