= Hundseid's Cabinet =

Government of Norway from 1932 to 1933

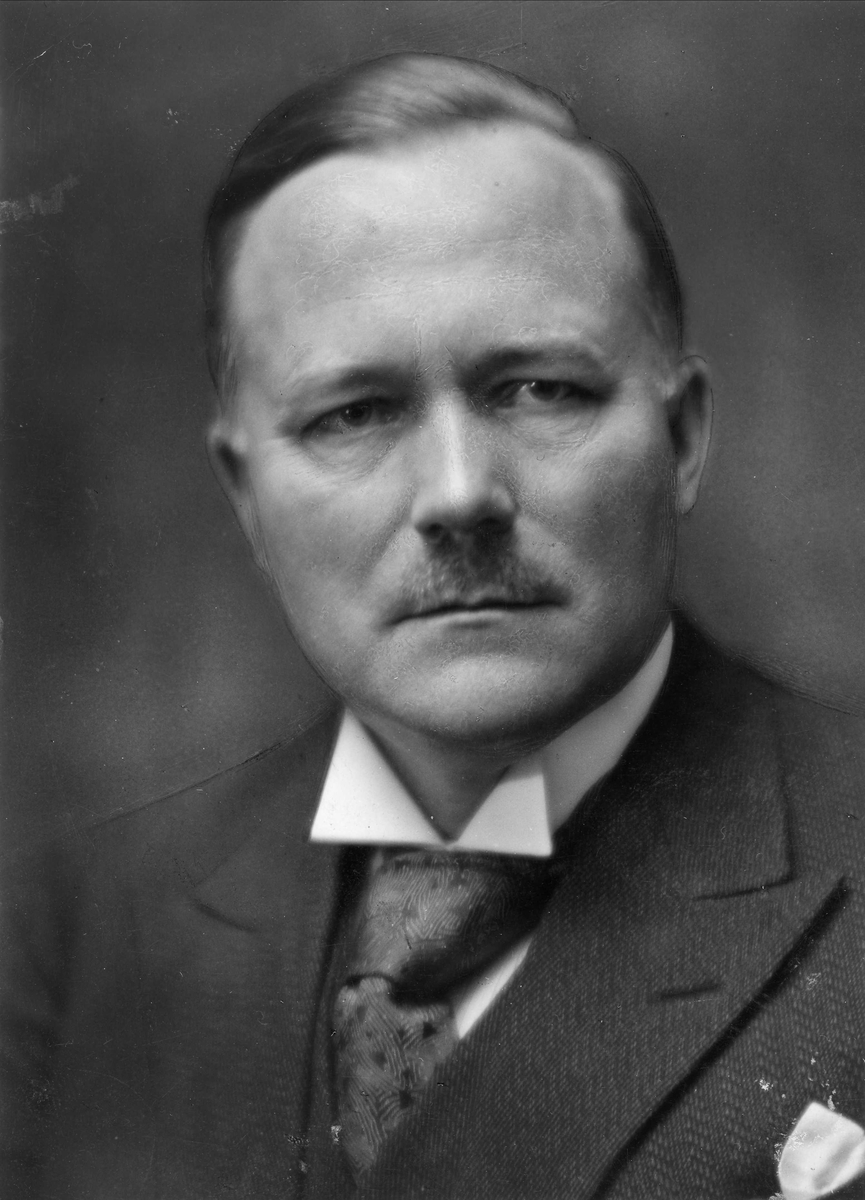
Image of Jens Hundseid

Hunseid's Cabinet governed Norway from 14 March 1932 to 3 March 1933. The Agrarian Party cabinet was led by Prime Minister Jens Hundseid. It had the following composition:

== Cabinet members ==
Cabinet
Portfolio	Minister	Took office	Left office	Party
Prime Minister	Jens Hundseid	14 March 1932	3 March 1933	Farmers'
Minister of Foreign Affairs	Birger Braadland	14 March 1932	3 March 1933	Farmers'
Minister of Defence	Vidkun Quisling	14 March 1932	3 March 1933	Independent
Minister of Finance	Jon Sundby	14 March 1932	3 March 1933	Farmers'
Minister of Trade	Ivar Kirkeby-Garstad	14 March 1932	3 March 1933	Farmers'
Minister of Labour	Rasmus Olsen Langeland	14 March 1932	3 March 1933	Farmers'
Minister of Justice and the Police	Asbjørn Lindboe	14 March 1932	3 March 1933	Farmers'
Minister of Social Affairs	Jakob Nilsson Vik	14 March 1932	3 March 1933	Farmers'
Minister of Agriculture	Jens Hundseid	14 March 1932	3 March 1933	Farmers'
Minister of Education and Church Affairs	Nils Trædal	14 March 1932	3 March 1933	Farmers'
