= Braadland =

Braadland is a Norwegian surname. Notable people with the surname include:

- Birger Braadland (1879–1966), Norwegian politician
- Erik Braadland (1910–1988), Norwegian diplomat and politician, son of Birger
