= Svein Sundsbø =

Norwegian businessman and politician

Minister of Agriculture
- In office 4 October 1985 – 9 May 1986
- Prime Minister: Kåre Willoch
- Preceded by: Finn T. Isaksen
- Succeeded by: Gunhild Øyangen

Political Advisor for the Ministry of Petroleum and Energy
- In office 8 February 2013 – 16 October 2013
- Prime Minister: Jens Stoltenberg
- Minister: Ola Borten Moe

Personal Advisor for the Minister of Transport and Communications
- In office 1 September 1984 – 1 January 1985
- Prime Minister: Kåre Willoch
- Minister: Johan J. Jakobsen

Secretary General of the Centre Party
- In office 1976–1984
- Leader: Dagfinn Vårvik; Gunnar Stålsett; Johan J. Jakobsen
- Preceded by: John Holm
- Succeeded by: John Dale

Personal Secretary for the Minister of Agriculture
- In office 23 May 1973 – 16 October 1973
- Prime Minister: Lars Korvald
- Minister: Einar Moxnes

Leader of the Centre Youth
- In office 1 January 1970 – 31 December 1971
- Preceded by: John Dale
- Succeeded by: Asbjørn Ringen

Personal details
- Born: 3 July 1943 (age 82) Lindås Municipality, Hordaland, Norway
- Party: Centre
- Relations: Dagfinn Sundsbø (brother)

Svein Sundsbø (born 3 July 1943 in Lindås Municipality) is a Norwegian businessman and politician for the Centre Party.

He was the general secretary of the Centre Party from 1976 to 1984. He worked as a political advisor in the Ministry of Agriculture in 1973, during the cabinet Korvald, and in the Ministry of Transport from 1984 to 1985, during the second cabinet Willoch. From 1985 to 1986 he was the Minister of Agriculture.

On the local level Sundsbø was a member of the municipal council of Frogn Municipality from 1975 to 1983, serving the last four years as deputy mayor.

Outside politics he graduated from the Norwegian College of Agriculture in 1969, and worked until 1976 as a research fellow and researcher. From 1986 to 1992 he was director of the Norges landbruksvitenskapelige forskningsråd. When it was merged to become the Research Council of Norway, Sundsbø was CEO there from 1992 to 1994. He edged out applicants such as Knut Grøholt, Rolf Skår, Hugo Parr and seven others.

He was managing director of Elkem from 1995 to 2005, and of the Federation of Norwegian Industries from 2006. He was a member of the board of Det Norske Luftfartselskap from 1995 to 1997, the Norwegian Museum of Science and Technology from 1999 to 2006 and Synnøve Finden from 2006 to 2007. Since 2007 he is the chair of Synnøve Finden. He is a fellow of the Norwegian Academy of Technological Sciences.

He is the older brother of politician Dagfinn Sundsbø.

Party political offices
Preceded by John Holm	Secretary general of the Centre Party; 1976–1984	Succeeded by John Dale
Political offices
Preceded by Finn T. Isaksen	Norwegian Minister of Agriculture; 1985–1986	Succeeded by Gunhild Øyangen
