= Morten Ringard =

Norwegian educator and writer (1908–1973)

Morten Richard Ringard (18 May 1908 – 1973) was a Norwegian educator and writer.

He was born in Holmestrand. He spent much of his career in Flekkefjord, from 1942 as a school director. In the same year he wrote a book on the city history, Flekkefjords historie. In 1952 he wrote the 200-year history of Holmestrand in Byen under fjellet. He biographed Hans Seland, Gustaf Fröding, Herman Bang and Metternich. His poetry collections include Nattens Sang (1931). He was honored with a Festschrift in 1968.
