= Dagfinn Sundsbø =

Norwegian politician

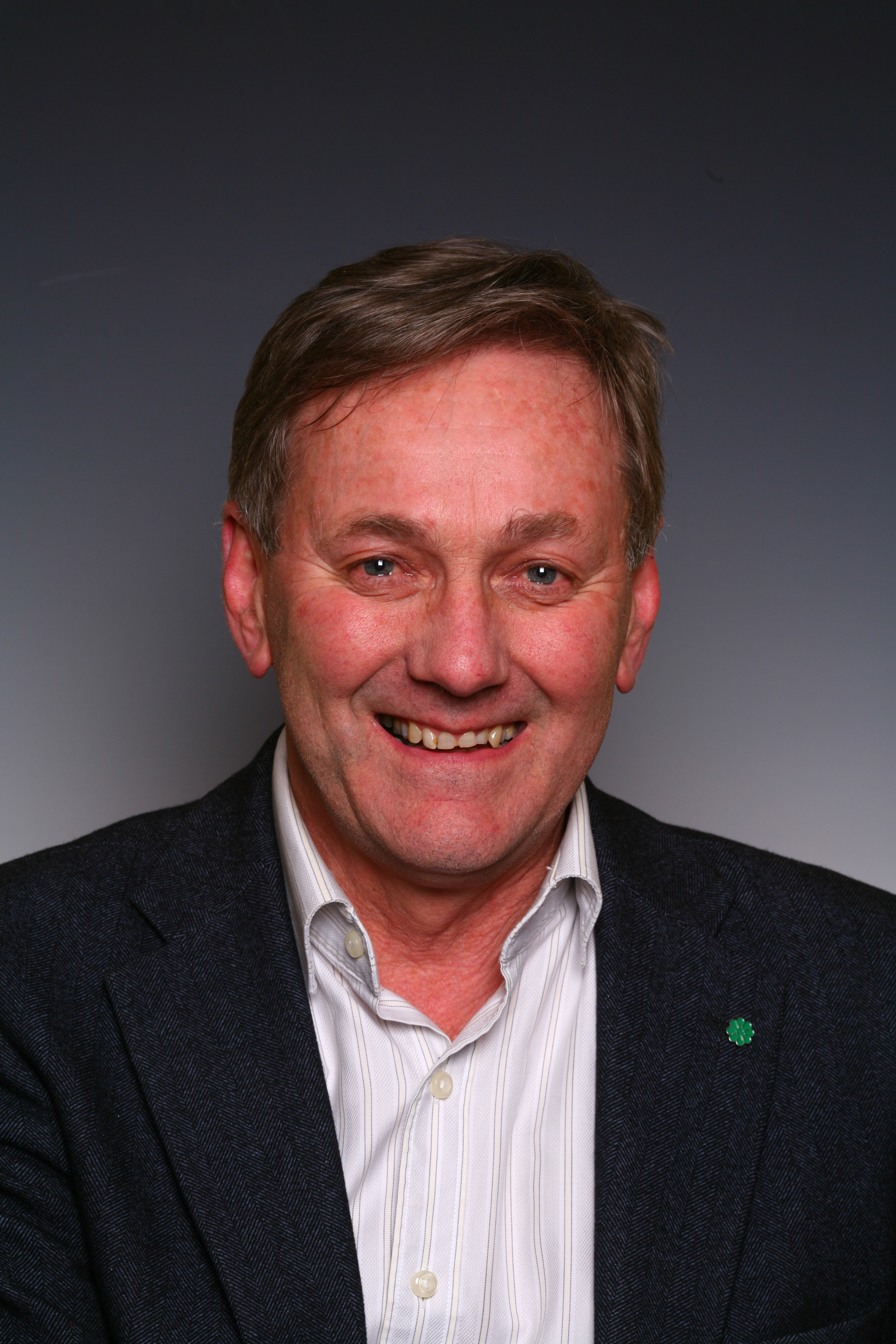
Dagfinn Sundsbø

Dagfinn Sundsbø (born 11 December 1946) is a Norwegian politician for the Centre Party.

He was born in Lindås Municipality as a son of farmers. He is the brother of politician Svein Sundsbø.

He worked in the Norwegian Agrarian Association from 1980 to 2001 and was the general secretary of the Centre Party from 2001 to 2005. He has also been involved in Nei til EU. In local politics, Sundsbø was a member of the municipal council of Fet Municipality from 1987 to 1991, and of Akershus county council from 1991 to 2005.

He served as a deputy representative to the Parliament of Norway from Akershus during the terms 1993–1997, 1997–2001, 2001–2005 and 2005–2009. During the fourth term he met as a regular representative meanwhile Åslaug Haga was appointed to the Stoltenberg's Second Cabinet. Haga left the cabinet in June 2008, meaning that Sundsbø lost his parliament seat. He was not re-elected either in the 2009 general election. Instead Sundsbø was appointed State Secretary in the Ministry of Health and Care Services. He left office in September 2012, being relieved of the position following a cabinet reshuffle. He went on to become a political adviser for the Centre Party parliamentary group.

He has been a deputy member in Norway's Contact Committee for Immigrants and the Authorities since 2006, and was a member of two committees that delivered the Norwegian Official Reports 2001:05 (leader of the committee) and 2000:22.

Party political offices
Preceded by	Secretary general of the Centre Party; 2001–2005	Succeeded by Ivar Egeberg
