= Finn Isaksen =

Norwegian politician

Minister of Agriculture
- In office 8 June 1983 – 4 October 1985
- Prime Minister: Kåre Willoch
- Preceded by: Johan C. Løken
- Succeeded by: Svein Sundsbø

Deputy Member of the Norwegian Parliament
- In office 1 October 1977 – 30 September 1981
- Constituency: Akershus

Personal details
- Born: Finn Trond Isaksen; 24 April 1924 Frogn, Akershus, Norway
- Died: 29 September 1987 (aged 63)
- Party: Centre
- Children: Geir Isaksen

Finn Trond Isaksen (26 April 1924 – 29 September 1987) was a Norwegian politician for the Centre Party who served as Minister of Agriculture from 1983 to 1985.
