= Hans Borgen =

Norwegian politician (1908–1983)

Minister of Agriculture
- In office 28 August 1963 – 25 September 1963
- Prime Minister: John Lyng
- Preceded by: Einar Wøhni
- Succeeded by: Leif Granli

Vice President of the Odelsting
- In office 8 October 1965 – 30 September 1969
- President: Nils Hønsvald
- Preceded by: Jakob Martin Pettersen
- Succeeded by: Erland Steenberg

Member of the Norwegian Parliament
- In office 1 January 1950 – 30 September 1969
- Constituency: Akershus

Personal details
- Born: 24 September 1908 Fet, Akershus, Norway
- Died: 12 September 1983 (aged 74) Nord-Odal, Hedmark, Norway
- Party: Centre
- Spouse: Martha Konstance Linnerud

Hans Borgen (24 September 1908 – 12 September 1983) was a Norwegian politician for the Centre Party.

Borgen was born in Fet Municipality in Akershus county. He was elected as a member of the municipal council for Fet Municipality in the periods 1947–1951, 1951–1955 and 1955–1959.

He was also elected to the Norwegian Parliament from Akershus in 1950, and was re-elected on four occasions. From August to September 1963 he served as the Minister of Agriculture during the short-lived centre-right cabinet Lyng. During this time his place in the Parliament was taken by Hans Christian Brevig.

Political offices
Preceded by Einar Wøhni	Minister of Agriculture; August 1963–September 1963	Succeeded by Leif Granli
