= Håkon Five =

Norwegian politician

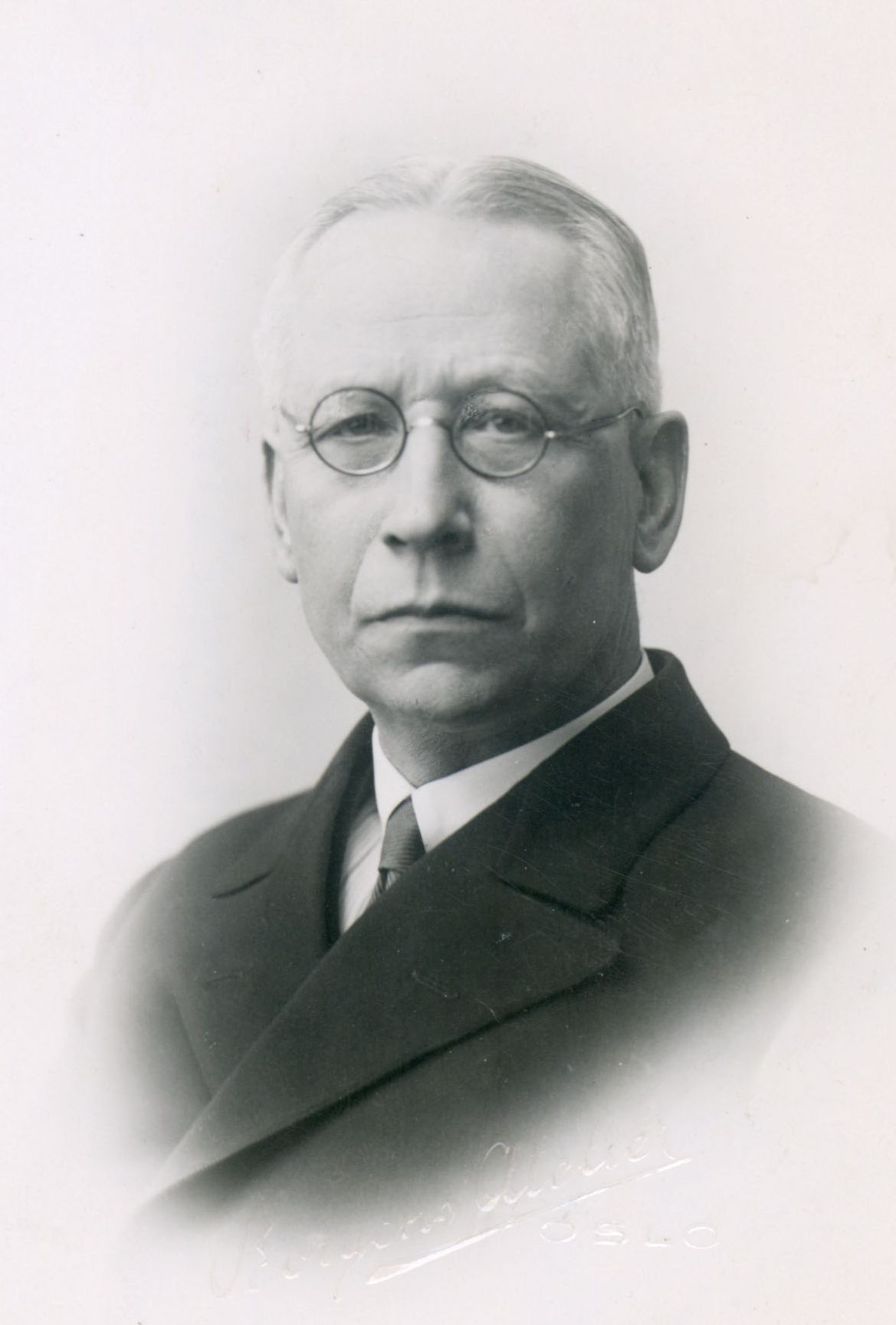

Minister of Agriculture
- In office 3 March 1933 – 20 March 1935
- Prime Minister: Johan Ludwig Mowinckel
- Preceded by: Jens Hundseid
- Succeeded by: Hans Ystgaard
- In office 25 July 1924 – 5 March 1926
- Prime Minister: Johan Ludwig Mowinckel
- Preceded by: Anders Venger
- Succeeded by: Ole Bærøe
- In office 26 July 1921 – 6 March 1923
- Prime Minister: Otto Blehr
- Preceded by: Martin Olsen Nalum
- Succeeded by: Anders Venger
- In office 12 December 1919 – 21 June 1920
- Prime Minister: Gunnar Knudsen
- Preceded by: Gunnar Knudsen
- Succeeded by: Gunder Anton Jahren

Minister of Provisioning
- In office 20 February 1919 – 21 June 1920
- Prime Minister: Gunnar Knudsen
- Preceded by: Birger Stuevold-Hansen
- Succeeded by: Johan Rye Holmboe

County Governor of Nord-Trøndelag
- In office 11 November 1927 – 15 January 1944
- Monarch: Haakon VII
- Prime Minister: Ivar Lykke; Christopher Hornsrud; Johan Ludvig Mowinckel; Peder Kolstad; Jens Hundseid; Johan Nygaardsvold
- Preceded by: Halvor Bachke Guldahl
- Succeeded by: Asbjørn Lindboe

Member of the Norwegian Parliament
- In office 1 January 1934 – 31 December 1936
- Constituency: Nord-Trøndelag
- In office 1 January 1922 – 31 December 1930
- Constituency: Nord-Trøndelag

Personal details
- Born: Håkon Martin Henriksen Five; 27 September 1880 Kvam Municipality, Nordre Trøndheim, United Kingdoms of Sweden and Norway
- Died: 15 January 1944 (aged 63) Kvam, Nord-Trøndelag, Norway
- Party: Liberal
- Spouse(s): Bodil Erichsen (1911–1924; her death); Henriette von der Recke Holtsmark (1927–1944; his death)

Håkon Martin Henriksen Five (27 September 1880 – 15 January 1944) was a Norwegian politician for the Liberal Party. He was Minister of Agriculture 1919–1920, 1921–1923, 1924–1926 and 1933–1935, and Minister of Provisioning 1919–1920.

Five was Member of Parliament for Nord-Trøndelag county 1922–1930 and 1934–1936. He also served as County Governor of Nord-Trøndelag from 1927 until his death in 1944.

Civic offices
Preceded by Halvor Bachke Guldahl	County Governor of Nord-Trøndelag; 1927–1944	Succeeded by Torbjørn Eggen (NS/occupied Norway); Asbjørn Lindboe
