= Bent Berger =

Norwegian judge

Bent Berger (6 May 1898 – 2 May 1985) was a Norwegian judge.

He graduated with the cand.jur. degree in 1919, and then worked as a deputy judge and auxiliary judge in several places in Norway. In 1928 he was hired as a judge in Trondheim, in 1936 his position was abolished, hence he moved to Namdal where he was district stipendiary magistrate in Namdal District Court. From 1940 to 1945 Norway was occupied by Nazi Germany. Following the liberation of Norway on 8 May 1945, Berger was acting County Governor of Nord-Trøndelag for a short period. Later, in September 1945, he was named as a Supreme Court Justice. He stood in this position until his retirement in 1968.

Civic offices
| Preceded by Torbjørn Eggen (NS/occupied Norway); Håkon Five | County Governor of Nord-Trøndelag (acting); 1945 | Succeeded by Asbjørn Lindboe |
