= Hans Christian Brevig =

Norwegian politician

- Born: 21 September 1904; Vestby, Norway
- Died: 15 October 1974 (aged 70)
- Occupations: farmer and politician.

Hans Christian Brevig (21 September 1904 – 15 October 1974) was a Norwegian farmer and politician. Brevig served as mayor of Vestby for 19 years 1945–1964. He was also elected deputy representative to the Storting for 4 periods, 1950–1965, for the Agrarian/Centre Party and Akershus. He replaced Hans Borgen at the Storting August–September 1963, when Borgen was member of Lyng's Cabinet.

Brevig was born in Vestby to Johan H. Brevig and Maren Georgine Gulbrandsen. He married Ingrid Jørgensen in 1935.

Brevig died on 15 October 1974.
