= Ivar Egeberg =

Norwegian politician (born 1950)

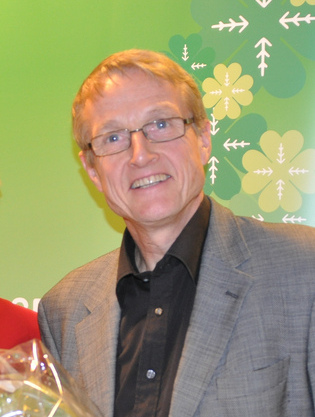
Ivar Egeberg

Ivar Egeberg (born 11 March 1950) is a Norwegian sports official, retired athlete and politician for the Centre Party.

== Career ==
He served as a deputy representative to the Parliament of Norway from Akershus during the term 1989–1993. Between 1997 and 1998, during the first cabinet Bondevik, he was appointed as a State Secretary in the Ministry of Culture. On the local level, he was elected to Sørum municipal council in 1983, and later became deputy mayor during the periods 1987–1991 and 1999–present, and mayor during the term 1995–1999. In 2006 he was hired as secretary general of the Centre Party. He left in September 2009.

Outside politics he was the secretary-general of the Norwegian Trotting Association (1985–1988), the Norwegian Football Association (1988–1996) and the Norwegian Olympic Committee and Confederation of Sports (1998–2004). He has also been involved in the Bislett Games.

== Awards ==
As an active athlete he won the silver medal at the national marathon championships in 1979, behind Jan Fjærestad, and a bronze medal in 1980. He represented the sports club IL i BUL. His personal best marathon time was 2:17:03 hours, achieved in September 1979 in Drammen. He also chaired the club from 1985 to 1986.

Sporting positions
Preceded by Svein Haagenrud	Secretary-general of the Norwegian Football Association; 1988–1996	Succeeded by Trygve Bornø
Party political offices
Preceded by Dagfinn Sundsbø	Secretary-general of the Centre Party; 2006–2009	Succeeded by Knut M. Olsen
