= Anne Petrea Vik =

Norwegian politician (born 1933)

Minister of Agriculture
- In office 16 October 1989 – 3 November 1990
- Prime Minister: Jan P. Syse
- Preceded by: Gunhild Øyangen
- Succeeded by: Gunhild Øyangen

Personal details
- Born: 8 January 1933 (age 93) Trondenes, Troms, Norway
- Party: Centre

Anne Petrea Vik (born 8 January 1933) is a Norwegian politician for the Centre Party.

From 1989 to 1990, while the cabinet Syse held office, Vik was appointed Minister of Agriculture.

On the local level she was a member of the municipal council of Kvæfjord Municipality from 1975 to 1975, and later served as deputy mayor from 1995 to 1999. From 1979 to 1987 she was a member of Troms county council.

From 1979 to 1984 she chaired the Centre Party Women's Association, during the same period she was a member of the Centre Party central party board. She was a member of the board of the Norwegian Agrarian Association from 1979 to 1984 and of Harstad University College from 1994 to 1997. She has also been involved in the Royal Norwegian Society for Development.

Outside politics she worked in Televerket from 1951 to 1955 and as a farmer from 1955 to 2001.

Political offices
Preceded by Gunhild Øyangen	Norwegian Minister of Agriculture; 1989–1990	Succeeded by Gunhild Øyangen
