= Knut Magnus Olsen =

Norwegian politician (born 1954)

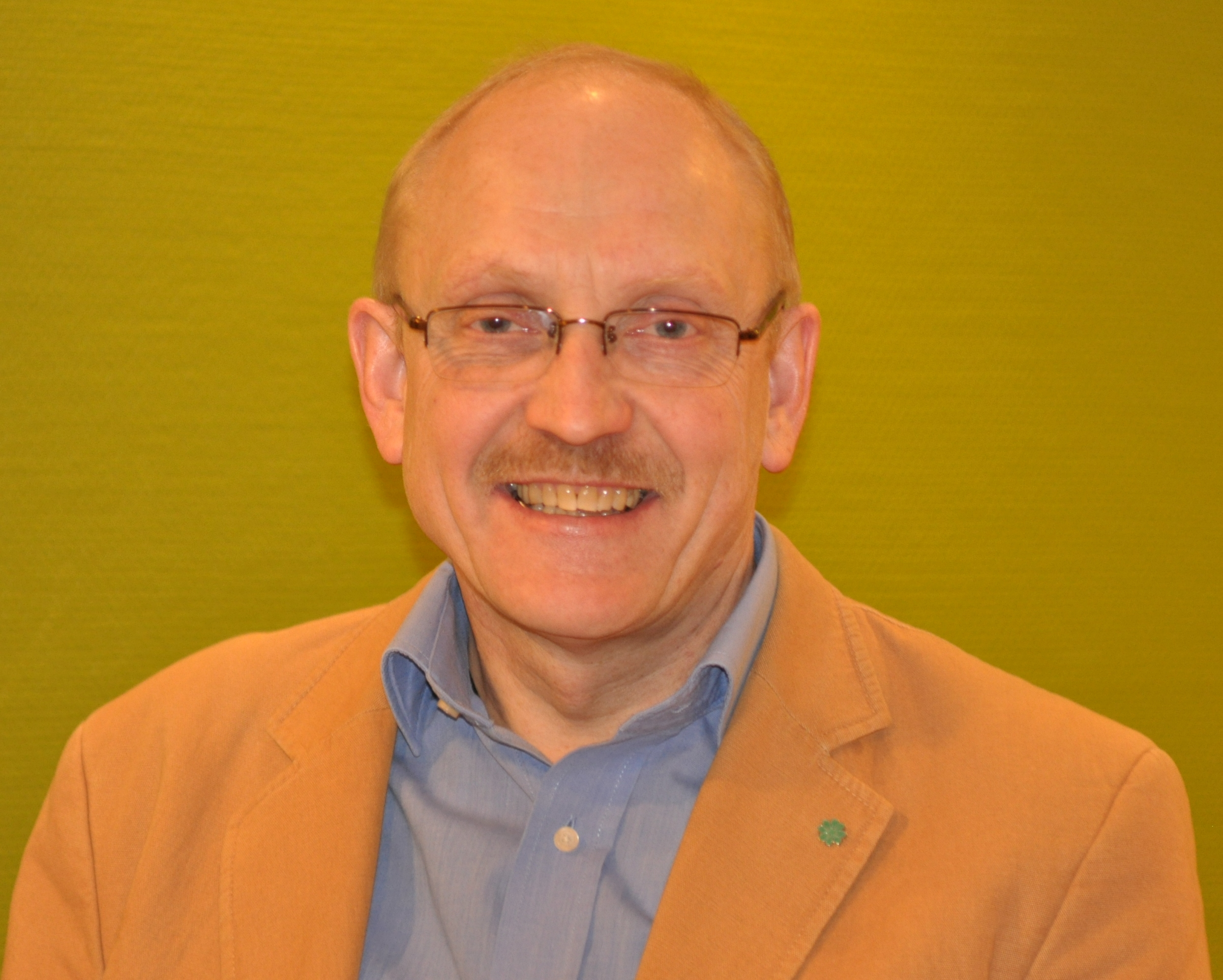

General Secretary of the Centre Party
- In office 19 March 2010 – 1 April 2026
- Leader: Liv Signe Navarsete; Trygve Slagsvold Vedum
- Preceded by: Ivar Egeberg
- Succeeded by: Ole André Myhrvold

Deputy Member of the Storting
- In office 1 October 2005 – 30 September 2013
- Constituency: Sogn og Fjordane

Personal details
- Born: 6 May 1954 (age 72) Jølster, Sogn og Fjordane, Norway
- Party: Centre

Knut Magnus Olsen (born 6 May 1954) is a Norwegian politician for the Centre Party.

He's been a deputy representative to the Parliament of Norway from Sogn og Fjordane from 2005 to 2013. He hails from Jølster Municipality.

In 2010, he became secretary-general of the Centre Party. He announced in October 2025 that he would leave the position on 1 April 2026. He was succeeded by former member of parliament, Ole André Myhrvold.

Party political offices
Preceded by Ivar Egeberg	Secretary-general of the Centre Party; 2010–2026	Succeeded by Ole André Myhrvold
