= Asbjørn Lindboe =

Norwegian politician

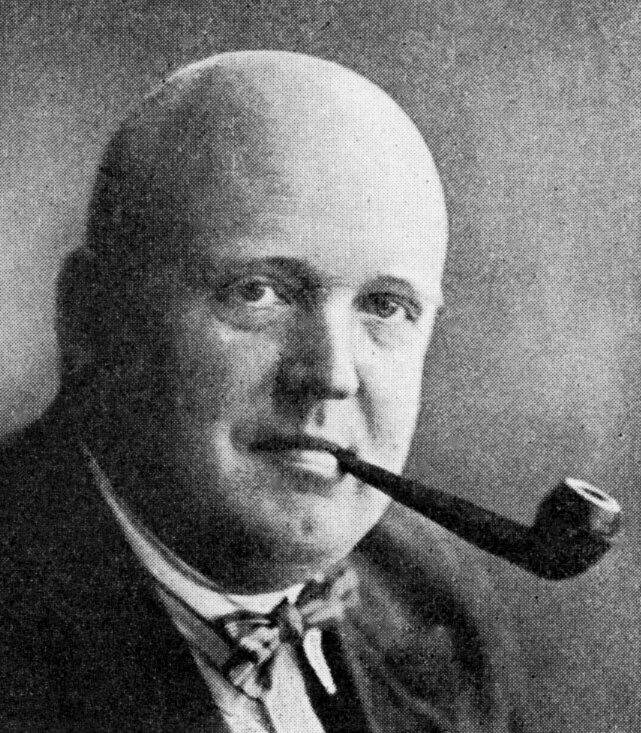
- Lindboe in ca. 1935.

Minister of Justice
- In office 12 May 1931 – 3 March 1933
- Prime Minister: Peder Kolstad; Jens Hundseid
- Preceded by: Arne T. Sunde
- Succeeded by: Arne T. Sunde

County Governor of Nord-Trøndelag
- In office 1946–1959
- Prime Minister: Einar Gerhardsen; Oscar Torp
- Preceded by: Bent Berger
- Succeeded by: Gustav Sjaastad

Personal details
- Born: 19 June 1889 Trondheim, Sør-Trøndelag, Sweden-Norway
- Died: 8 March 1967 (aged 77) Bærum, Akershus, Norway
- Party: Agrarian

Asbjørn Lindboe (19 June 1889 – 8 March 1967) was a Norwegian politician of the Agrarian Party who served as Minister of Justice from 1931–1933 under prime ministers Peder Kolstad and Jens Hundseid. He later served as County Governor of Nord-Trøndelag from 1946–1959.

Lindboe was the son of Trondheim lawman and parliamentary representative Jacob Albert Lindboe (Liberal). He became an MSc. in 1914, and was a deputy clerk in Nordfjord 1914–1915, an attorney at Trondheim City Attorney General 1915–1919 and a private practice lawyer in Trondheim 1919–1931 (Supreme Court Attorney from 1925). He was then Minister of Justice in the Agrarian Party Governments of Kolstad and Hundseid from 1931 to 1933. From 1933 he was a magistrate in the Inderøy magistrate's office, a position he held until he was dismissed by the occupying authorities in 1943. On 23 November 1945, he was appointed County Governor of Nord-Trøndelag, and assumed office in 1946. He resigned after having reached the age limit in 1959, and move to Bærum.

== Function at the Trondheim Student Society ==
In the Student Year in Trondheim, his first year, Asbjørn Lindboe was one of the most important figures. He contributed as both writer and actor in the first UKErevyes, but is today best known for having been the leader of the Student Society Building Committee, whose aim was to raise money and build a new house for the Student Society in Trondheim. In 1929, this house was built, and it is still used by the Student Society in Trondheim. As an active member of the Student Society, Lindboe was the proprietor of the Grand Cross of the Golden Cat, the Order of the Student Society's Internal Theater, 1919 and the Grand Cross of the Order of the Black Fathers, the Student Society of the Order of Trondheim.

Political offices
Preceded by Arne T. Sunde	Minister of Justice and the Police; 1931–1933	Succeeded by Arne T. Sunde
Civic offices
Preceded by Bent Berger	County Governor of Nord-Trøndelag; 1946–1959	Succeeded by Gustav Sjaastad
