= Erik Enge =

Norwegian politician (1852–1933)

Leader of the Agrarian Party
- In office 1927–1930
- Preceded by: Kristoffer Høgset
- Succeeded by: Jens Hundseid

Leader of the Free-minded Liberal Party
- In office 1915–1918
- Preceded by: William Nygaard
- Succeeded by: Bernt Holtsmark

Minister of Agriculture
- In office 20 February 1912 – 31 January 1913
- Prime Minister: Jens Bratlie
- Preceded by: Bernt Holtsmark
- Succeeded by: Gunnar Knudsen

Member of the Norwegian Parliament
- In office 1 January 1928 – 31 December 1930
- Constituency: Oppland
- In office 1 January 1910 – 31 December 1912
- Constituency: Oppland
- In office 1 January 1896 – 31 December 1906
- Constituency: Oppland

Personal details
- Born: Erik Mathiassen Enge; 3 March 1852 Østre Gausdal, Oppland, United Kingdoms of Sweden and Norway
- Died: 26 October 1933 (aged 81)
- Party: Agrarian; Free-minded Liberal
- Spouse: Else Olsdatter Hoft (m. 1876)
- Children: Kinni Sandahl

Erik Mathiassen Enge (3 March 1852 – 26 October 1933) was a Norwegian politician for the Free-minded Liberal Party and later the Agrarian Party. He served as Minister of Agriculture from 1912 to 1913. From 1927 to 1930, he was the leader of the Agrarian Party. Enge was a farmer by profession.
