= Einar Wøhni =

Norwegian politician

Minister of Agriculture
- In office 23 April 1960 – 28 August 1963
- Prime Minister: Einar Gerhardsen
- Preceded by: Harald J. Løbak
- Succeeded by: Hans Borgen

Member of the Norwegian Parliament
- In office 1 October 1961 – 30 September 1965
- Constituency: Troms

Personal details
- Born: Einar Joachim Wøhni; 7 May 1920 Lebesby, Finnmark, Norway
- Died: 14 February 1987 (aged 66) Trondheim, Sør-Trøndelag, Norway
- Party: Labour
- Spouse: Edith Margrethe Wøhni
- Children: 1 daughter

Einar Joachim Wøhni (7 May 1920, in Lebesby Municipality – 14 February 1987) was a Norwegian politician for the Labour Party.

He was elected to the Norwegian Parliament from Troms county in 1961, but was not re-elected in 1965. He was the Minister of Agriculture from April 1960 to August 1963 during the third cabinet Gerhardsen. During the period he was replaced in the Norwegian Parliament by Hanna Berg Angell.

On the local level he was a member of the municipal council for Kvæfjord Municipality from 1955 to 1959.

Political offices
Preceded by Harald Johan Løbak	Norwegian Minister of Agriculture; 1960–1963	Succeeded by Hans Borgen
