= Lars Olai Meling =

Norwegian Minister of Trade

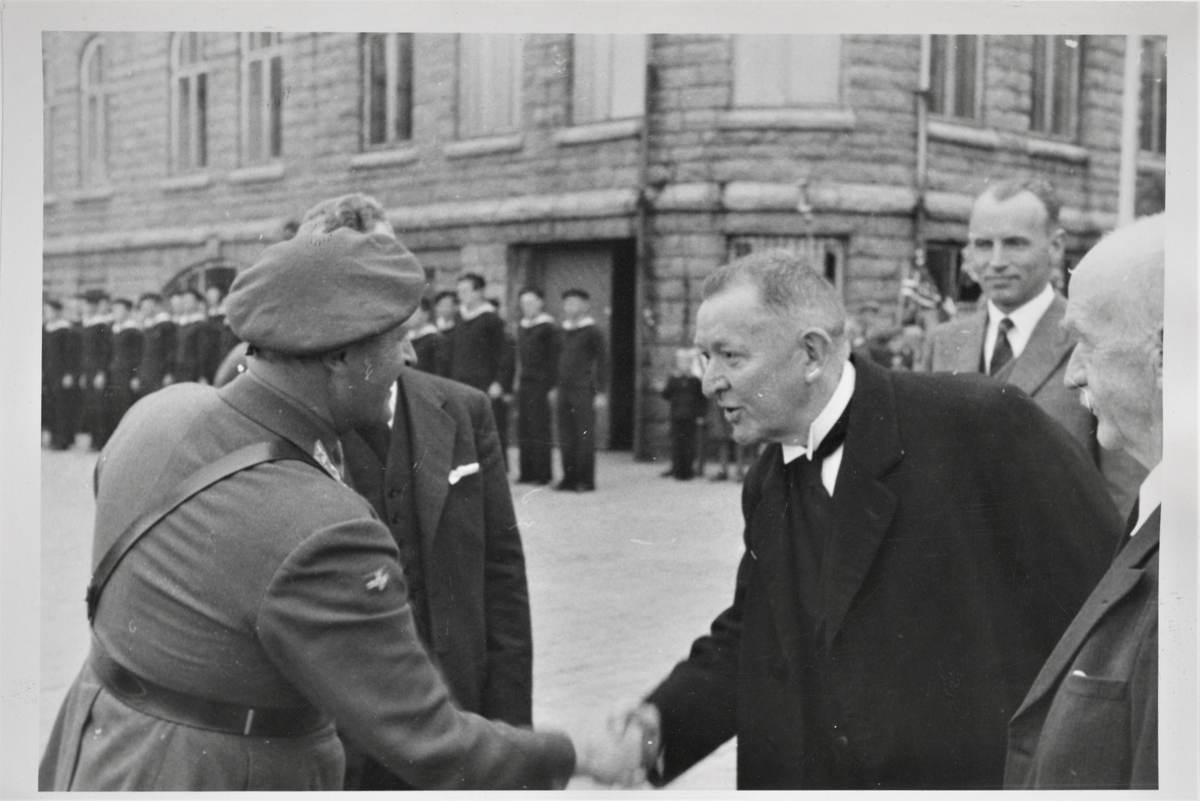

Minister of Trade
- In office 25 July 1924 – 5 March 1926
- Prime Minister: Johan Ludwig Mowinckel
- Preceded by: Johan Henrik Rye Holmboe
- Succeeded by: Charles Robertson
- In office 3 March 1933 – 20 March 1935
- Prime Minister: Johan Ludwig Mowinckel
- Preceded by: Ivar Kirkeby-Garstad
- Succeeded by: Alfred Madsen

Personal details
- Born: 8 May 1876
- Died: 12 May 1951 (aged 75)
- Party: Liberal

Lars Olai Meling (1876–1951) was the Norwegian Minister of Trade 1924–1926 and 1933–1935.
