= Dag Terje Andersen =

Norwegian politician (born 1957)

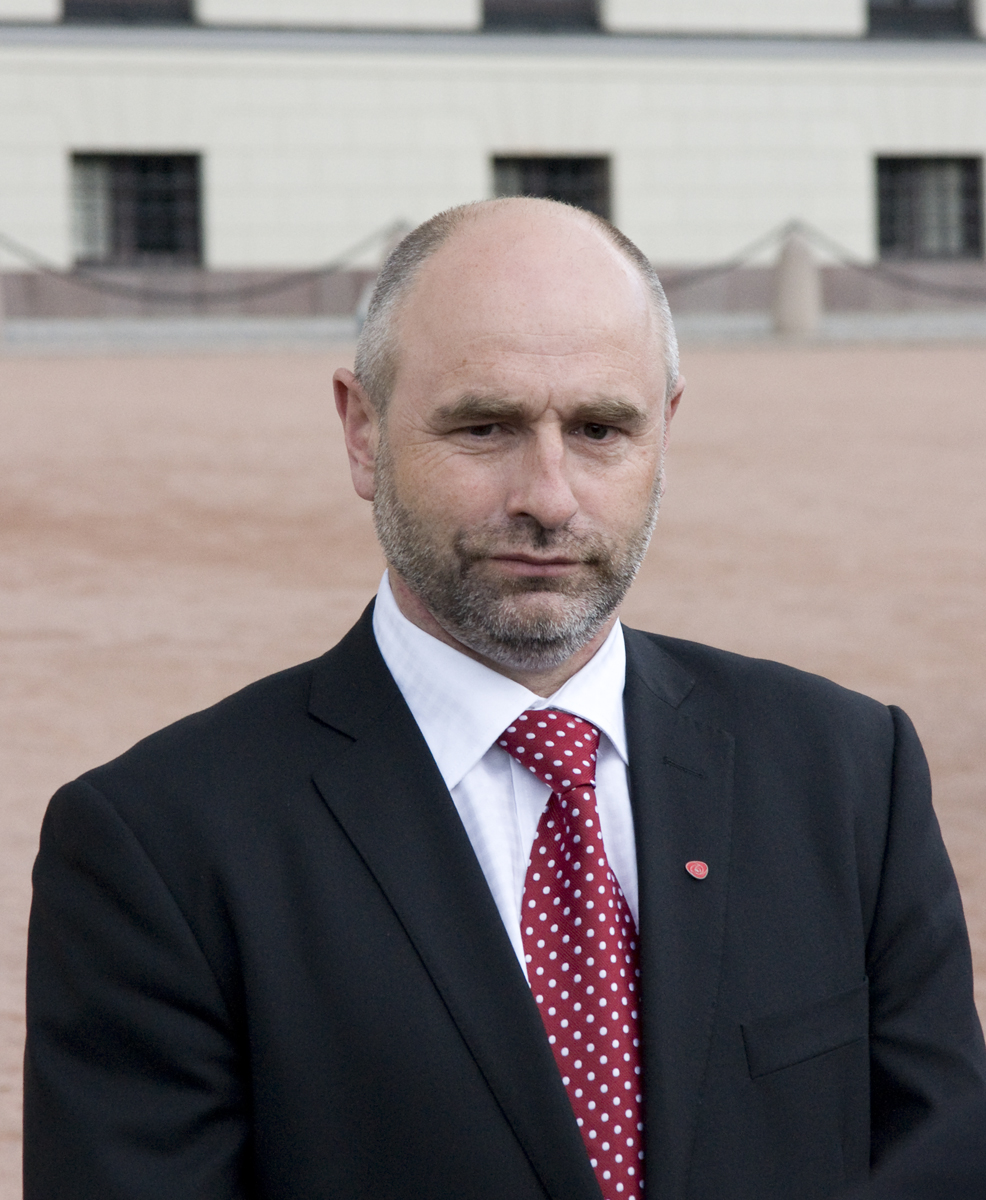

President of the Storting
- In office 8 October 2009 – 30 September 2013
- Monarch: Harald V
- Prime Minister: Jens Stoltenberg
- Preceded by: Thorbjørn Jagland
- Succeeded by: Olemic Thommessen

Minister of Labour and Social Inclusion
- In office 20 June 2008 – 2 October 2009
- Prime Minister: Jens Stoltenberg
- Preceded by: Bjarne Håkon Hanssen
- Succeeded by: Hanne Bjurstrøm

Minister of Trade and Industry
- In office 29 September 2006 – 20 June 2008
- Prime Minister: Jens Stoltenberg
- Preceded by: Odd Eriksen
- Succeeded by: Sylvia Brustad

Minister of Agriculture
- In office 25 October 1996 – 17 October 1997
- Prime Minister: Thorbjørn Jagland
- Preceded by: Gunhild Øyangen
- Succeeded by: Kåre Gjønnes

Party Secretary of the Labour Party
- In office 4 September 1992 – 25 October 1996
- Preceded by: Thorbjørn Jagland
- Succeeded by: Solveig Torsvik

Personal details
- Born: 27 May 1957 (age 69) Frogn Municipality, Akershus
- Party: Labour
- Spouse: Married
- Children: 2
- Occupation: Politician

Dag Terje Andersen (born 27 May 1957 in Frogn Municipality, Akershus) is a Norwegian politician for the Norwegian Labour Party. In addition to professional politics he has worked at a steel mill and as a lumberjack, something that has given him a reputation for politically representing the average citizen.

He was elected into the Norwegian parliament (Storting) as a representative from Vestfold in 1997, and he was re-elected in the 2005, 2009 and 2013 elections.

Andersen was the mayor of Lardal Municipality from 1987 to 1992. He was at first a political advisor at the Ministry of Foreign Affairs before he became state secretary at the Ministry of Social Affairs in 1992. He was a party secretary for the Norwegian Labour Party from 1992 until 1996.

In 1996 he became Minister of Agriculture, remaining in that post for slightly less than a year. Andersen later became Minister of Trade and Industry on 29 September 2006, when Odd Eriksen resigned.

From 2009 to 2013, Andersen served as President of the Storting.

Political offices
Preceded by Gunhild Øyangen	Minister of Agriculture; 1996–1997	Succeeded by Kåre Gjønnes
Preceded by Odd Eriksen	Minister of Trade and Industry; 2006–2008	Succeeded by Sylvia Brustad
Preceded by Bjarne Håkon Hanssen	Minister of Labour and Social Inclusion; 2008–2009	Succeeded by Hanne Bjurstrøm
Preceded by Thorbjørn Jagland	President of the Storting; 2009-2013	Succeeded by Olemic Thommessen
Party political offices
Preceded by Thorbjørn Jagland	Secretary of the Labour Party; 1992–1996	Succeeded by Solveig Torsvik
