= Lars Reidulv Kirkeby-Garstad =

Norwegian politician

Lars Reidulv Kirkeby-Garstad (9 March 1907 – 22 May 1977) was a Norwegian politician for the Centre Party.

He was born in Vikten as a son of politician Ivar Kirkeby-Garstad (1877–1951). He worked as a farmer. He was a member of the municipal council of Vikna Municipality from 1934 to 1937, then from 1947 to 1975. He served as deputy mayor from 1947 to 1951 and mayor from 1955 to 1975. He served as a deputy representative to the Parliament of Norway from Nord-Trøndelag during the terms 1954–1957, 1958–1961, 1961–1965 and 1965–1969. In total he met during 202 days of parliamentary session.
