= Olemic Thommessen =

Norwegian politician

Olemic Thommessen MP
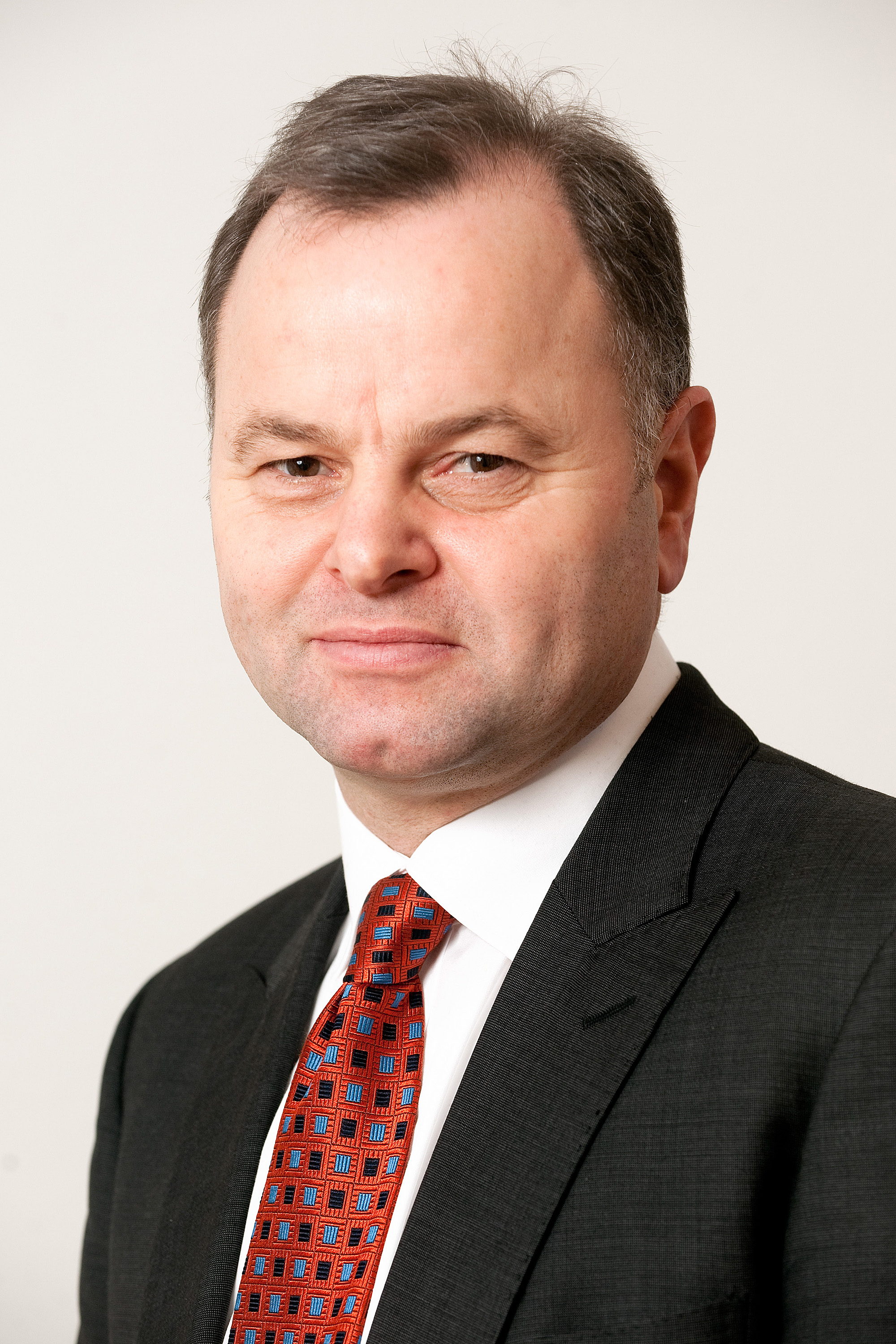

President of the Storting
- In office 8 October 2013 – 15 March 2018
- Monarch: Harald V
- Prime Minister: Jens Stoltenberg; Erna Solberg
- Preceded by: Dag Terje Andersen
- Succeeded by: Tone W. Trøen

Member of the Norwegian Parliament
- In office 1 October 2001 – 30 September 2021
- Constituency: Oppland

Personal details
- Born: 18 April 1956 (age 70) Lillehammer, Oppland, Norway
- Party: Conservative
- Spouse: Nina Høstmælingen
- Education: University of Oslo

Olaf Michael "Olemic" Thommessen (born 18 April 1956 in Lillehammer) is a Norwegian politician for the Conservative Party and the President of the Storting from 2013 until 2018. On 8 March 2018, he announced that he would step down due to controversies surrounding a building project for a new entrance to the garage for Stortinget. The project saw the initial budget ballooning and questionable decisions taken and Thommessen acknowledged his overall responsibility and said he would step down.

He was elected to the Norwegian Parliament from Oppland in 2001, and was re-elected on four occasions. He didn’t seek re-election in 2021. He previously served as a deputy representative during the term 1993–1997.

Thommessen was a member of Lillehammer municipality council from 1987 to 1995.

Cultural offices
Preceded by Tove Veierød	Chair of Foreningen Norden in Norway; 2010–present	Incumbent
Political offices
Preceded by Dag Terje Andersen	President of the Storting; 2013–2018	Succeeded by Tone Wilhelmsen Trøen
