= Gunhild Elise Øyangen =

Norwegian politician (born 1947)

Gunhild Øyangen

Minister of Agriculture
- In office 3 November 1990 – 25 October 1996
- Prime Minister: Gro Harlem Brundtland
- Preceded by: Anne Vik
- Succeeded by: Dag Terje Andersen
- In office 9 May 1986 – 16 October 1989
- Prime Minister: Gro Harlem Brundtland
- Preceded by: Svein Sundsbø
- Succeeded by: Anne Vik

Member of the Norwegian Parliament
- In office 1 October 1989 – 30 September 2005
- Constituency: Sør-Trøndelag

Personal details
- Born: Gunhild Elise Øyangen; 31 October 1947 (age 78) Levanger, Trøndelag, Norway
- Party: Labour

Gunhild Elise Øyangen (born 31 October 1947 in Levanger) is a former Norwegian politician for the Labour Party, most notably as Minister of Agriculture for the Second and Third cabinet Brundtland. She was elected to the Storting representing Sør-Trøndelag from 1989 to her retirement in 2005.

Preceded by Svein Sundsbø	Minister of Agriculture; 1986–1989	Succeeded by Anne Vik
Preceded by Anne Vik	Minister of Agriculture; 1990–1996	Succeeded by Dag Terje Andersen
