= Jon Sundby =

Norwegian farmer and politician

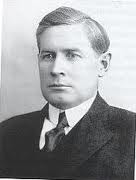

Minister of Finance
- In office 1 February 1932 – 3 March 1933
- Prime Minister: Peder Kolstad; Jens Hundseid
- Preceded by: Peder Kolstad
- Succeeded by: Per Berg Lund

Minister of Agriculture
- In office 12 May 1931 – 25 February 1932
- Prime Minister: Peder Kolstad
- Preceded by: Hans Jørgensen Aarstad
- Succeeded by: Ivar Kirkeby-Garstad

Personal details
- Born: 8 June 1883 Vestby, Akershus, United Kingdoms of Sweden and Norway
- Died: 14 December 1972 (aged 89) Vestby, Akershus, Norway
- Party: Agrarian
- Spouse: Bertha Marie Mørk (m. 1915)
- Education: Norwegian School of Agriculture
- Profession: Farmer

Jon Sundby (born 8 June 1883 in Vestby, died 14 December 1972 in Vestby) was a Norwegian farmer, politician and a council of state, and he had central positions of trust within agricultural economic organizations. He served as Minister of Agriculture and food from 1931-1932 and Minister of Finance from 1932-1933.

== Personal life ==
Sundby was born and grew up at Sundby farmyard in Vestby, Akershus, as the youngest child out of six. His father, Julius James Sundby (1837–1911) was a farmer and a political spokesman for Høyre, the conservatives, in Vestby, married to Othilie Strand (1841–1909). Jon Sundby married Bertha Marie Mørk on 29 April 1915.

Jon Sundby was the great-grandfather of the Olympic Champion Siren Sundby.

== Education ==
Sundby graduated state school in 1900, where he continued his education at Sem landbruksskole in Asker where he graduated in 1903. After graduating Norges landbrukshøgskole (Norwegian School of Agriculture) in 1905, and in 1908 he got a scholarship for Illinois College of Agriculture in United States.

== Career ==
=== Early career ===
Sundby worked as a teacher and for a while he was working as an elected officer at Sem during the period from 1906-12. From 1912 to 1960 he was a farmer at Sundby farmyard in Vestby.

=== Politician ===
Sundby was a board member of the Party of Agriculture from 1928 to 1945, and represented the party in Vestby for two periods. He was a member of the parliament from 1922 to 1945. During the governance of the Party of Agriculture, Sundby was a Norwegian Minister of Agriculture, 1931–1932, as well as head of the Ministry of Finance in 1932 under Jens Hundseid, then Minister of Finance 1932-1933. He was initially unwilling to become a council of the state, but gave in due to an ultimatum from Peder Kolstad when he was the Minister of Agriculture in 1931. Sundby was pivotal in developing the Norwegian subsidy schemes of agriculture.

=== Public engagements ===
In parallel to his political career Sundby had central positions of trust in the organizations of agriculture. He was the chief officer for Østlandets Melkesentral 1930-57, where he became an honorary member in 1958. He was also in trusted positions in Norske Melkeprodusenters Landsforbund and Meieribrukets Sentralstyre, as well as being the chairman of Felleskontoret for the central federation of agriculture 1945-57. Sundby was at the board of directors of the Norges Bank from 1938 to 1944, and continued for some more years after the war. In the period from 1909-21 he undertook several visits to Western-Europe as a consultant for Norsk Hydro.

Sundby was a clever academic- and political writer, and he was the author behind many books questioning and discussing agricultural concerns. He also wrote several articles within academic- and the daily press, especially as a member of staff in Tidens Tegn and Nationen.

== Bibliography ==
- 1919 En liten haandbok i kunstgjødselbruk. Med gjødslingplaner og skemaer for notater
- 1933 Bondepartiet, Bonderegjeringen og finansene
- 1959 Landbrukets økonomiske organisasjoner. Bakgrunn og motiver for deres utvikling og virksomhet. Litt historikk, med hovevekten på melkeorganisasjonene
- 1967 Litt biografi og litt historikk, særlig om Bondepartiets og bonderegjeringens landspolitikk, samt om tilblivelsen av melkesentralordningen

== Jon Sundbys medal of honor ==
Jon Sundbys medal of honor is awarded every second year to a person who has conducted achievements within dairy or agriculture more over. The medal of honor was first awarded in 1956. It is financed by the proceeds from Jon Sundbys fund.

Among winners to be mentioned are professor Roger K. Abrahamsen (2005), farmer Kåre Syrstad (1999), professor Berge Furre (1997), the general secretary Hans Haga (1991), the Norwegian 4H (1983) and professor Harald Skjervold (1970).
