= Jakob Nilsson Vik =

Norwegian farmer, dairy manager and politician

Jakob Nilsson Vik (March 12, 1882 – 1960) was a Norwegian farmer, dairy manager, and politician. He sat in the Parliament of Hordaland from 1928 to 1945, became the Norwegian Minister of Social Affairs 1931–1933 in Kolstad and Hundseid, and was the Consultative Councillor of State from 1940 to 1941.

Vik was born in Kvam Municipality, and was educated at the Uprights Agricultural School in 1903 and the National Dairy School, located in Brandbu, in 1906. Besides working as a farmer in Kvam, he was the dairy manager for several years. He also was the chairman of the Hardanger Meieribolag and director of The Norwegian Milk Manufacturers Association.

In 1919, Vik was elected to the municipal council of Kvam Municipality. During 1922-1931 he was the mayor, and in 1928, he was also elected to the Parliament. There he sat until 1945, first in Forestry and Water Resources Committee, then in Finance and Customs Committee, Social Committee, and the Military Committee.
