= Nils Trædal =

Norwegian politician (1879–1948)

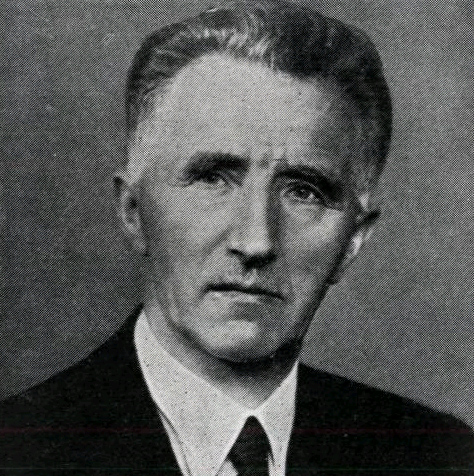

Minister of Education and Church Affairs
- In office 12 May 1931 – 3 March 1933
- Prime Minister: Peder Kolstad; Jens Hundseid
- Preceded by: Sigvald Hasund
- Succeeded by: Knut Liestøl

Leader of the Agrarian Party
- In office 1938 – 12 October 1948
- Preceded by: Jens Hundseid
- Succeeded by: Einar Frogner

Personal details
- Born: 29 November 1879 Sunndal Municipality, Møre og Romsdal, Sweden-Norway
- Died: 12 October 1948 (aged 68) Oslo, Norway
- Party: Agrarian
- Spouse: Gunda Amalie Ruth Holm (m. 1918)

Nils Trædal (29 November 1879 – 12 October 1948) was a Norwegian cleric and politician for the agrarian party Bondepartiet (later renamed Centre Party) and leader of the party from 1938 to 1948. He was Minister of Education and Church Affairs 1931–1932 and 1932–1933, as well as acting Prime Minister and acting Minister of Foreign Affairs in 1932.

Together with farmer and author Hans Seland and farmer union leader Hans Haga he was among the main agrarian party leaders to prevent the party from joining the fascist movement Nasjonal Samling, led by Vidkun Quisling.

He died after a fall from the second story of his home.
