= Hans Seland =

Norwegian politician and author

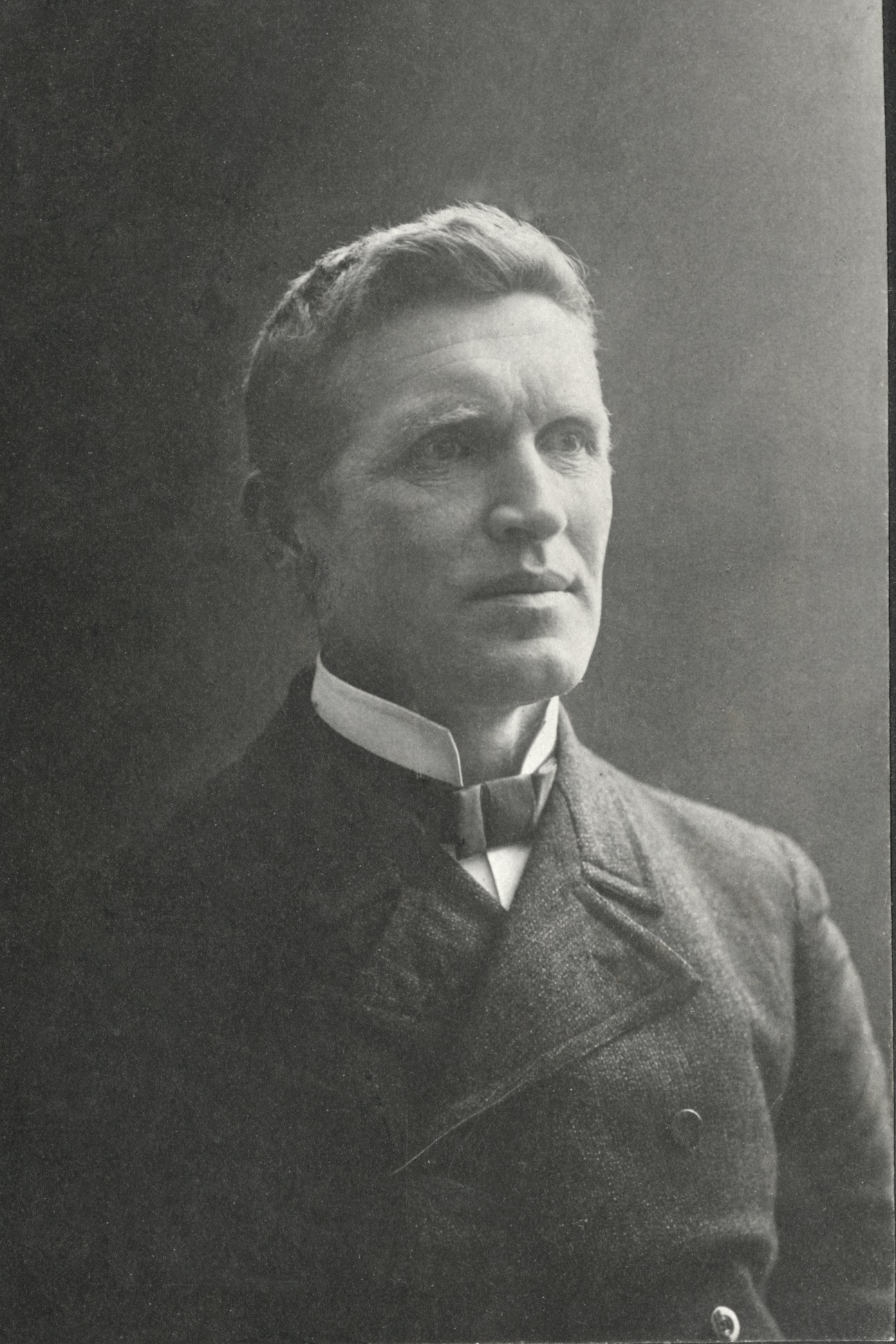
Hans Seland

Hans Seland (5 March 1867 – 30 June 1949) was a Norwegian politician and author.

== Background ==
Hans Andreas Johanneson Seland grew up on the Seland farm in the old Nes og Hitterø Municipality, near the town of Flekkefjord, in the county of Lister og Mandal, Norway. Seland attended Stend Agricultural School (1884–1886). He was editor in Nordmands in Christiania (1893–96) and before 1896 went back to Nes Municipality to take over father's farm at Seland. He was deputy to the Parliament of Norway for the Norwegian Liberal Party (1915–18) and for the Norwegian Agrarian Association (1921–24). Locally he was a member of Nes council board and bank auditor for 30 years. Hans Seland, together with Hans Haga and Nils Trædal, were among the most influential politicians in the Agrarian Party (Norges Bondelag) to prevent this group from joining the fascist Nasjonal Samling of Vidkun Quisling.

== Literary career ==
Seland reached out to a broad audience as the author of over 50 books. Almost all literature written by or about him is only available in Norwegian, reducing a potential international audience. He may not be among Norway’s most known authors, but is certainly among the most celebrated ones within such diverse circles as Norwegian emigrants in America. His fame as a wandering storyteller eventually led him to the States in 1904, where he visited several of the Norwegian immigrant communities which had grown up after the great migration from Norway. In 1925, he represented the Norwegian Farmers' Union at the Norse-American Centennial, the 100th anniversary of Norwegian emigration to America.

He writes in his autobiography Aar og Dagar how stunned he was to see how faithfully the Norwegian immigrants had preserved their dialects and the formal church language, and at the same time successfully accommodated to the American way of living. His travels inspired him to write several complimentary articles of the United States and the preservation of Norwegian history, literature, and culture in general among the emigrants living there. His fame led him to meet with President Theodore Roosevelt.

Seland chose to write in his native tongue, Nynorsk, at a time when most Norwegian authors still hung on to the Danish-inspired Bokmål. This and the quality of his writings, led him to the friendship with several other combatants of the new language, including such well-known authors as Ivar Aasen, Aasmund Olavsson Vinje, Arne Garborg, Jonas Lie, and Bjørnstjerne Bjørnson .

Seland was, above all, a humorist. Many of his books are in a genre that may be called stubs of fun, or in his own words; Morostubbar. They consist of many small humorous stories, the normal ones averaging about 1-2 pages each. These he wrote out of his own imagination, or based them on actual situations experienced on his travels. He traveled all around telling his tales, and was a frequent and popular voice on the radio of his days. Among the Norwegian comedians of the pre-war era, Seland would be counted among the greatest.

As Norway sought independence from the Kingdom of Sweden, Seland in 1904 gave out his book Prinsesse Gullsko og systerne hennar. As all adults were discussing how to find a peaceful solution to end the union with Sweden, Seland thought of the children. His book was a welcome breath of childish fun and imagination to the lives of thousands, and by using New Norwegian he reached a broader audience as the children finally got to read stories in their own dialect, as New Norwegian were, and still is, spoken by most Norwegians. He published several more books for children, and by 1908 he was involved in creating schoolbooks teaching children how to read in the new language. Illustrations to his books were by the noted artist Theodor Kittelsen among others.

== Selected works ==
- I straumen (1892)
- Hikstorier (1893)
- Andror (1898)
- Eikeli (1900)
- Norskt maal. Kvi strævar me? (1900)
- Prinsesse Gullsko og systrene hennar (1901)
- Høgsumar (1903)
- Um Amerika og frendefolket i Vesterheim (1904)
- Bygdefolk. Utvalde Skjemte-soger (1907)
- Dagros og andre dyr (1907)
- Frukthagen (1908)
- Stavebok for skule og heim (1908)
- Hetlesaki. Eit bilæte or norsk rettssoga (1908)
