= Per Larssen =

Norwegian politician

Per Larssen (11 June 1881 – 21 October 1947) was Norwegian Minister of Trade 1931–1932 in Kolstad's Cabinet.

Son of a farmer, he was an engineer by education, with a Ph.D from Dresden University of Technology in 1924. He worked as director of the National Insurance Service 1932–1937; as acting port director 1937–1940 and then as port director from 1940.
