= Jens Hundseid =

Norwegian politician (1883–1965)

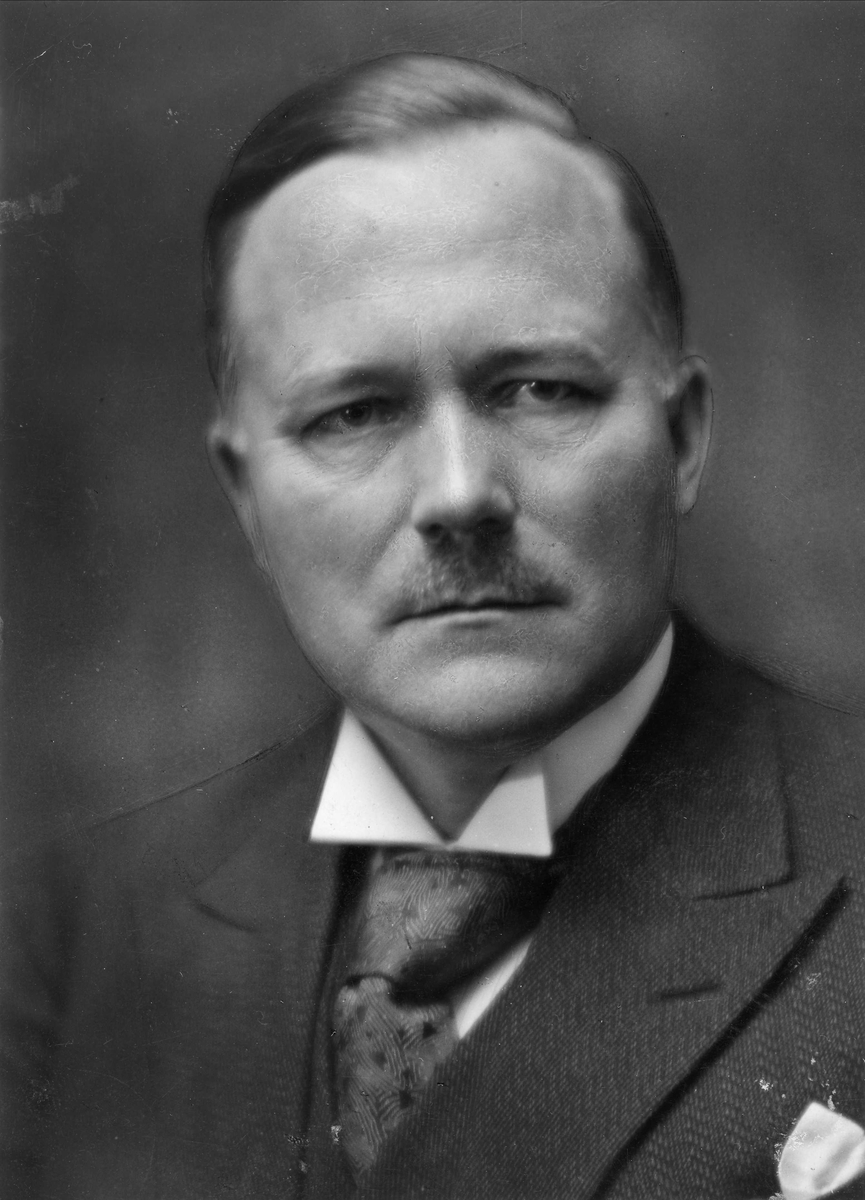
- Hundseid in 1935.

Prime Minister of Norway
- In office 14 March 1932 – 3 March 1933
- Monarch: Haakon VII
- Preceded by: Peder Kolstad
- Succeeded by: Johan Ludwig Mowinckel

Minister of Agriculture
- In office 14 March 1932 – 3 March 1933
- Prime Minister: Himself
- Preceded by: Ivar Kirkeby-Garstad
- Succeeded by: Håkon Five

Member of the Norwegian Parliament
- In office 1 January 1925 – 4 December 1945
- Constituency: Telemark (1925–1936); Buskerud (1937–1945)

Leader of the Agrarian Party
- In office 1930–1938
- Preceded by: Erik Enge
- Succeeded by: Nils Trædal

Personal details
- Born: Jens Valentinsen Hundseid; 6 May 1883 Vikedal, Rogaland, Sweden-Norway
- Died: 2 April 1965 (aged 81) Oslo, Norway
- Party: Agrarian; Nasjonal Samling
- Spouse: Martha Eknes (m. 1912)
- Children: 2
- Profession: Politician

Jens Valentinsen Hundseid (6 May 1883 – 2 April 1965) was a Norwegian politician from the Agrarian Party. He was a member of the Norwegian parliament from 1924 to 1940 and the prime minister of Norway from 1932 to 1933.

Hundseid felt forced to join Nasjonal Samling who supported the Nazis in 1940, a choice he later called "cowardly". In the legal purge in Norway following World War II he was sentenced to 10 years in prison. Pardoned in 1949 he lived a recluse in Oslo until his death in 1965.

== Early life, education and civil career ==
Hundseid was born at the farm Hundseid in Vikedal which had belonged to his mother's family for generations. He studies at a local agricultural school and later at the Agricultural University of Norway. where he was together with Jon Sundby and Håkon Five was among the top students. After he finished his studies in 1905, he worked at lower secondary schools to 1908 when he became a research fellow at the Agricultural University and he briefly studied agriculture in England and Scotland in 1911. He worked as a teacher at Sem Agricultural school 1910-1912 and Telemark Agricultural School 1912-1913. He was editor of Eidsvold Blad 1916-1918 and combined this with working as a teacher at Eidsvoll folk high school. He became head of Telemark Agricultural School in 1918. Having married a farmer's daughter in 1912, he also ran his wife's family farm after 1913.

== Politics ==
According to Halvdan Koht who knew Kolseid when he was young, he was initially conservative and later sympathized with the Liberal Party. He became a member of the Farmer's Party when it was formed in 1920.

He candidated for the Norwegian Agrarian Association in the 1918 Norwegian parliamentary election and for the Farmer's Party in the 1921 election, both times without getting elected. He was elected to the Parliament of Norway for the Centre Party from Telemark in the 1924 parliamentary election.

In the Parliament he served as member of the Committee on Social Affairs from 1924 to 1931. Later he would become member of the Committee on Forestry and Watercourses and in 1937 a member of the Committee on University and Higher Education.

He became a member of the Executive Board of the Farmer's Party in 1926 and the same year elected deputy leader under Kristoffer Høgset. In 1929, he became leader of the party, a position he held to 1938. He also served as parliamentarian leader of the Farmer's Party from 1931 to 1940, with the exception of the period 1932-1933 when he served as prime minister. He was credited within the party for being a good administrator.

As a member of the Social Committee, Hundseid came in opposition to the Labour Party on unemployment issues, where he often argued that the unemployed could do more to get a job and believed economic support for them should mostly be restricted to food stations. His relationship with the Liberal Party and its leader Johan Ludwig Mowinckel was also often tense.

== Prime minister and return to parliament ==
When the Farmer's Party formed its first cabinet in 1931, Peder Kolstad was chosen as prime minister instead of Jens Hundseid who was seen as too controversial for the role. He wasn't included in the cabinet either. However, when Kolstad died the following year, Hundseid was appointed prime minister in March 1932 and formed the Hundseid's Cabinet, mostly with the same ministers as in the preceding Kolstad Cabinet. In addition to the position as prime minister, Hundseid also served as Minister of Agriculture. Hundseid didn't want Minister of Defence Vidkun Quisling to continue in the cabinet but Quisling argued hard to keep it and was supported by many other ministers. He was included in the cabinet, but had a difficult relationship to Hundseid from the start.

In April 1932, Quisling strongly attacked the Labour Party in the trontale (opening secession debate) in the Parliament. The Labour Party responded by a motion of no-confidence against the cabinet, but did not gain majority for the motion.

In summer 1932, diplomat Fritz Wedel Jarlsberg secretly gave authorization from Hundseid to negotiate the Eastern Greenland dispute with Denmark. In October, he returned to Norway with a proposal to a treaty where Norway gave up the claim of sovereignty of Eastern Greenland, but was granted economic rights to fishing and trapping in the area. The negotiations was not publicly known before the Summer 1933 when Norway lost the dispute in the International Court of Justice and Hundseid who then had resigned as Prime Minister was sharply criticized in the Parliament for having permitted the negotiations.

The Hundseid cabinet fell in March 1933 when the Labour Party and the Liberal Party both supported a motion of no-confidence over the cabinet's economic politics. It was replaced by Mowinckel's Third Cabinet. Hundseid went back to his prior role as parliamentarian leader in the Parliament in addition to being the party's leader.

== Nasjonal Samling membership and conviction after WWII ==
After the German occupation of Norway in April 1940, Hundseid was approached during the summer by a representative from Reichskommissariat Norwegen who wanted Hundseid to lead a new organization for farmers which was meant to replace the Norwegian Agrarian Association. Hudseid declined the offer. In the autumn, he was called to a meeting with Nasjonal Samling councillor of state Sverre Riisnæs. In a follow-up meeting, Riisnæs gave Hundseid a declaration written by Quisling which he wanted Hundseid to sign. Hundseid signed a somewhat moderated statement where he declared he would become a member of Nasjonal Samling and be writing newspaper contributions in favour of NS. While Hudseid distanced himself from Nasjonal Samling and fascism after the war, he also had a track record of stark, antisemitic statements, including claims that Jews were "not real Norwegians".

After the liberation of Norway on 8 May 1945, Hundseid was arrested the following day. During the legal purge he was charged with five crimes:

- Treason, for having joined Nasjonal Samling after the occupation.
- Tried to pressure members of the administration in Buskerud to become members of Nasjonal Samling.
- Written two articles in Buskerud Blad and Fritt Folk which was published in 1940 where he encouraged people generally to become members of Nasjonal Samling
- In a circular to mayors in Buskerud encouraged them to collaborate with Nasjonal Samling.
- Granted 5,000 Norwegian kroner to the surviving family members of Norwegians who had fought for Germany on the Eastern Front.

Despite his record of antisemitism, some historians regard him as a mostly passive member of Nasjonal Samling.

In the lagmannsrett, he was found guilty and sentenced to twelve years of penal labour, confiscation of ca. 54,000 Nkr and to pay a compensation of 25,000 Nkr to the government. The Supreme court reduced the sentence to ten years of penal labour and also reduced the confiscation amount.

He was released in 1949, having been imprisoned for four years.

== Later years ==
Hundseid died in Oslo on 2 April 1965. He was buried at Komnes churchyard in Sandsvær, now part of Kongsberg.

Political offices
Preceded by Peder Kolstad	Prime Minister of Norway; 1932–1933	Succeeded by Johan Ludwig Mowinckel
