= Peder Kolstad =

Norwegian politician

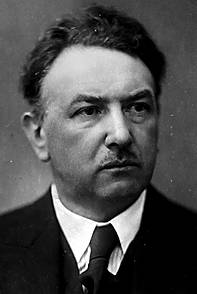

Prime Minister of Norway
- In office 12 May 1931 – 5 March 1932
- Monarch: Haakon VII
- Preceded by: Johan Ludwig Mowinckel
- Succeeded by: Jens Hundseid

Minister of Finance
- In office 12 May 1931 – 1 February 1932
- Prime Minister: Himself
- Preceded by: Per Berg Lund
- Succeeded by: Jon Sundby

Personal details
- Born: Peder Ludvik Kolstad; 28 November 1878 Borge, Østfold, United Kingdoms of Sweden and Norway
- Died: 5 March 1932 (aged 53) Oslo, Norway
- Party: Agrarian
- Spouse: Ingrid Mathiesen (m. 1905)
- Children: 3 sons

Peder Ludvik Kolstad (28 November 1878 – 5 March 1932) was a Norwegian politician from the Agrarian Party. He was the prime minister of Norway from 1931 until his death in 1932.

== Early life and education ==
Born to a farmer's family in Borge, now part of Fredrikstad in Østfold county he got a degree from Kalnes school of agriculture in 1899 and a degree from the Agricultural University of Norway at Ås, Akershus county in 1902. He subsequently worked as teachers at agricultural schools in Asker, Akershus county and Nedenes, Aust-Agder county. Returning to Østfold and Kalnes school of agriculture in 1905, he became principal at the school in 1912.

== Early political and organizational career ==
In Østfold, Kolstad became engaged in organisational work related to agriculture. He served as leader of the Tune chapter of the Norwegian Agrarian Association, became leader of the Østfold county chapter and member of the national board of the organisation. He also sat on the board of the agricultural cooperative Felleskjøpet.

In the period from 1919 to 1922, he was part of the herredsstyre (selective body of the municipal council) in Tune. He was a member of the municipal council until 1928 and leader of the Østfold chapter of the Farmer's Party for several years in the 1920s.

At the Agrarian Association's congress in Kristiansand in 1920, he played an important role in the process that led to the decision that the organization should nominate its own list in the 1921 Norwegian parliamentary election, leading to the establishment of the Farmer's Party.

In the 1921 Norwegian parliamentary election, Kolstad topped the list for the Farmers' Party in Østfold and was elected to the Parliament of Norway and subsequently re-elected in all elections until his death. He served in the Standing Committee on Finance in all his parliamentary career, becoming head of the committee in 1928. He served as secretary for the Farmers' Party's parliamentary group in all his years in Parliament and was elected President of the Odelsting in 1931. In this period, he also headed the Østfold chapter of the Farmer's Party for several years.

As finance politician, Kolstad like his party argued for austerity, in particular he wanted to reduce public administration He led the majority in the Farmer's Party that supported the Liberal Mowinckel's Cabinet's decision to return the Norwegian krone to the gold standard in 1928 after convertibility had been suspended after World War I.

== As prime minister ==
Mowinckel's Cabinet's decision to grant the Anglo-Dutch company Unilever Concession to acquire half the shares in the Norwegian company Lilleborg caused a political crisis in 1931, leading to the resignation of the cabinet and the formation of the first cabinet from the Farmer's Party.

The Farmers' Party had only 25 of the 150 seats in the Parliament; the weakest foundation for a cabinet in Norway to that date. The cabinet would seek support in the parliament from the Liberal Party and the Conservative Party. The party chose Kolstad as prime minister instead of the party leader Jens Hundseid to a large degree because he was seen as being moderate and better at cooperating with other parties and politicians than Hundseid. The party also saw it as an advantage that he was well versed in financial policies.

=== Formation of the cabinet ===
Never having been in government before, the party lacked experienced persons for the ministerial positions. The Cabinet had 10 members. Kolstad took the position of Minister of Finance in addition to being prime minister. He set as an ultimatum that Jon Sundby should take the position as Minister of Agriculture; Sundby himself originally wanted to stay in the Parliament as leader of the Standing Committee on Agriculture. A controversial choice was major Vidkun Quisling as Minister of Defence. Quisling had not been involved in party politics and Sundby did not personally know him. Kolstad stated that Quisling's knowledge about Russia as demonstrated in his writings would be useful for the cabinet.

=== The Lilleborg case ===
The Mowinckel Cabinet had granted the Norwegian company Lilleborg concession to buy De-No-Fa's oil mill in Fredrikstad and at the same time given concession for De-No-Fa, which was 50% owned by the Dutch company Unilever, to acquire half the shared in Lilleborg. This would give Unilever control over Lilleborg. While the Farmer's party opposed the concession as they wanted to protect Norwegian ownership of industry and it led to the fall of the Mowinkel Cabinet, Kolstad's Cabinet found it impossible to revoke the concession. De-No-Fa stated the mill would have to close without a concession and at the same time De-No-Fa and Unilever had negotiated a new contract which would give Unilever control over Lilleborg even without a concession. On 10 July 1931, the Kolstad cabinet confirmed the concession that the Mowinckel's Cabinet had already given.

=== Eastern Greenland dispute ===
On 26 May 1923, the newly established Det Norske Ishavsråd (English: The Norwegian Arctic Council) published a proposal to that Norway should claim sovereignty over part of the area near Scoresbysund. Norwegian whalers and trappers stayed in the area. The Farmer's Party had a post in their program that Norway should assert historical rights in Greenland and whaling interest in the Arctic Oceans. Nevertheless, Kolstad was initially negative to the proposal.

In June the same year, the cabinet got a telegram from Hallvard Devold who led a Norwegian expedition in Greenland which stated that Norwegians had occupied Myggbukta and declared the nearby area for Norwegian territory, calling it Erik the Red's Land. After multiple cabinet discussions, the cabinet issued a royal declaration on 10 July 1931 where Eastern Greenland was claimed as Norwegian territory. The decision was met with condemnation from the Labour Party. Denmark contested the claim and brought the case to the International Court of Justice where they won in 1933.

=== The Menstad conflict ===
When Kolstad formed the cabinet in May 1931, the industry in Norway had been marked by strikes and lock-out since March. In Menstad near Porsgrunn, Norsk Hydro hired temporary workers to unload a number of ships. The union considered those workers to be strikebreakers. The cabinet sent 120 police officers to protect the workers. After the police officers were attacked by stones and sticks on 8 June, the cabinet sent military forces to the place – soldiers and four vessels – which calmed the situation. Although Quisling was not prominent in making the decision, as Minister of Defence the non-socialist parties gave him most of the credit while he became considered an enemy by the labour movement.

=== Economic and agricultural policies ===
To support Norwegian farmers, the cabinet proposed that all margarine sold in Norway should contain a certain percentage of butter. This was legalized in the Parliament in June 1923. The cabinet also proposed to increase the subsidies to farmers that produced corn. The Liberal Party initially opposed the increase, but after Kolstad threatened to resign over the issue a compromise was reached.

Following the United Kingdom's decision to leave the gold standard in September 1923, the Kolstad cabinet decided to abandon the standard the same month. At the same time, the cabinet devaluated the Norwegian krone which sank more than most other currencies in Europe, which helped the Norwegian export.

In December 1923, Kolstad was informed that the large banks Bergens Privatbank and Den norske Creditbank were in grave financial troubles. The cabinet and a majority in the Parliament backed a plan by the Norwegian Central Bank to help the bank with liquidity, but Kolstad blamed the Central Bank for not having addressed the problem at an earlier stage and argued in favour of more political influence over the Central Bank.

== Health problems and death ==
Kolstad suffered various health problems during his time as prime minister and was hospitalised in January 1932. He died of a blood clot on 5 March 1932. Jens Hundseid became prime minister for a new Farmers' party government on 14 March.

== Personal life and legacy ==
Kolstad married Ingrid Mathiesen, daughter of an industrialist, in 1905. He was post mortem father-in-law to Liberal politician and women rights activist Eva Kolstad and the grandfather to film critic Harald Kolstad.

He was interred at Tune churchyard. A road in Sarpsborg is named after him.

In the book Norsk statsministre (English: Norwegian prime ministers) from 2010 edited by Gudleiv Forr and Per Egil Hegge, historians rated Kolstad as one of Norway's weakest prime ministers with a grade of 2 on a scale from 1 to 6. The historians put weight on how long the person served as prime minister in their evaluation.

== Literature ==
- Borgen, Per Otto (1999). Norges statsministre. Aschehoug. ISBN 82-03-22389-3.
- Gabrielsen, Bjørn Vidar (1970). Menn og politikk : Senterpartiet 1920–1970. Aschehoug.
- Nielsen, May-Brith Ohman (2001). Bondekamp om markedsmakt. Senterpartiets historie 1920–1959. Det Norske Samlaget.
