= Centre Party (Norway) =

Centrist and agrarian political party in Norway

Centre Party Senterpartiet
- Abbreviation: Sp
- Leader: Trygve Slagsvold Vedum
- Parliamentary leader: Trygve Slagsvold Vedum
- Founded: 19 May 1920; 106 years ago
- Headquarters: Akersgata 35, Oslo
- Youth wing: Centre Youth
- Membership (2024): ▼15,783
- Ideology: Agrarianism (Nordic); Economic nationalism; Euroscepticism
- Political position: Centre
- Nordic affiliation: Centre Group
- Colours: Green
- Slogan: Nær folk ('Close to people')
- Storting: 9 / 169
- County Councils: 106 / 574
- County Mayors: 2 / 15
- Municipal Councils: 1,274 / 9,344
- Municipal Mayors: 86 / 357
- Sami Parliament: 0 / 39

Website
- senterpartiet.no

The Centre Party (Norwegian: Senterpartiet, Sp; Northern Sami: Guovddášbellodat), formerly the Farmer's Party (Note: Although Bondepartiet is sometimes translated as the Agrarian Party, sources such as the Centre Party itself and Statistics Norway use the term Farmers' Party.) (Norwegian: Bondepartiet, Bp), is an agrarian political party in Norway.

Ideologically, the Centre Party is positioned in the centre on the political spectrum, it advocates for economic nationalist and protectionist policy to protect Norwegian farmers with toll tariffs, and it supports decentralisation. It was founded in 1920 as the Farmers' Party (Norwegian: Bondepartiet, Bp) and from its founding until 2000, the Centre Party joined only governments not led by the Labour Party, although it had previously supported a Labour government in the 1930s. This turned around in 2005, when the party joined the red–green coalition government led by the Labour Party. Governments headed by prime ministers from the party include the short-lived Kolstad and Hundseid's Cabinet between 1931 and 1933 and the longer-lasting Borten's Cabinet from 1965 until 1971.

The Centre Party has maintained a strong stance against Norwegian membership in the European Union, successfully campaigning against Norwegian membership in both the 1972 and 1994 referendums, during which time the party saw record-high election results. Subsequently, the party proposed Norway's withdrawal from the European Economic Area and the Schengen Agreement. In 2017, party deputy leader Ola Borten Moe declared nationalism to be a "positive force".

== History ==
The party was founded at the national convention of the Norsk Landmandsforbund during 17–19 June 1920, when it was decided by the association to run for the 1921 Norwegian parliamentary election. In 1922, the association was renamed to the Norwegian Agrarian Association and the political activity of the group was separated as the Farmers' Party (Bondepartiet).

During the eight decades since the Centre Party was created as a political faction of a Norwegian agrarian organisation, the party has changed a great deal. Only a few years after its creation, the party broke with its mother organisation and started developing a policy based on decentralisation. The 1930s have in the post-war era been seen as a controversial time in the party's history. This is partly because Vidkun Quisling, who later became the leader of Nasjonal Samling, was Minister of Defence in the Farmers Party Kolstad and Hundseid cabinets from 1931 to 1933. However, Quisling was not a member of the Farmers Party. While there were fascist sympathies among parts of the Farmers Party's electorate, the Farmers Party itself never supported fascism and it was the Farmers' Party that enabled the first stable Labour cabinet in Norway. In 1935, they reached a compromise with the Labour Party which led to the Nygaardsvold Cabinet. In addition, the Farmers' Party was represented in the war-time cabinet by Anders Fjelstad, who served as a consultative councillor of state. Political scientist Trond Nordby argues that the Farmers' Party has been given an undeservably bad reputation from this time and that the party was not really "as dark brown as some claim".

In 1959, the party briefly changed its name to the Norwegian Democratic Party – Democrats (Norsk Folkestyreparti – Demokratene), but it soon had to change the name again due to election technicalities. In June 1959, the name was changed to the current Centre Party. This happened out of the need to attract an additional electorate with the continuing decline of the agrarian share of the population. The party's membership numbers peaked at 70,000 in 1971. From 1927 to 1999, the party published the newspaper Fylket.

In local elections, the party has enjoyed strong support in several small municipalities, where the party has a strong influence. After the 2007 Norwegian local elections, 83 of the mayors in Norway represented the Centre Party. Only the Labour Party had more mayors and the Centre Party had more mayors than any other, relative to party size.

The Centre Party had been a part of both centrist and centre-right coalition governments from 1963 to 2000 and in six governments, one of which were led by a Prime Minister from the party. Since the 2005 Norwegian parliamentary election, the party ran for government together with the Labour Party and the Socialist Left Party as the red–green coalition, with the Centre Party constituting the green part of the alliance. The coalition was successful in winning the majority of the seats in the Storting and negotiations followed with the aim of forming a coalition cabinet led by the Labour Party's leader Jens Stoltenberg. These negotiations succeeded and the Centre Party entered the Second Stoltenberg Cabinet on 17 October 2005 with four ministers. The Red–Greens were re-elected to government in the 2009 Norwegian parliamentary election. It has been argued that the party's ideology moved more towards social democracy at the end of the 1980s.

The party is known for its support of high toll tariffs on foreign cheese and meat called "toll protection" as well as their proposal to shoot all wolves in Norway. However, this has lately been rejected as the party's policy by Sandra Borch, the predator policies spokesperson of the Centre Party, who in a 2020 interview given on the debate program to Dagsnytt 18 on NRK1 stated that "[t]he Centre Party has never proposed to exterminate the wolf. We want substainable management of predators", adding that "[w]hat the Centre Party has been a part of, together with the Liberal Party in a broad agreement in the Storting, is that we will have 4-6 breeding wolf packs in Norway."

The party was also in charge of implementing the Berne Convention on the Conservation of European Wildlife and Natural Habitats in 1986. The Centre Party's Rakel Surlien was Minister of the Environment when Norway ratified the Berne Convention, so that protection of wolves became Norwegian law. The Berne Convention was otherwise adopted by a unanimous Storting, which also included all MPs from the Centre Party.

In late 2012, the Centre Party caused controversy in Norway when it emerged that the party had demanded higher import tariffs on meat and hard cheeses to protect Norwegian farmers from foreign competition. This included increased duties of 429% on lamb, 344% on beef and 277% on all but 14 exempted hard cheeses.

Since the leadership of Trygve Slagsvold Vedum during years in opposition, the party has been described as populist by several sources. Vedum's first parliamentary election as leader, in 2017, saw the party nearly double its vote and seat total. At the 2021 election, the party won a further nine seats, bringing their total to 28. It was the party's best result since 1993 and the second-best result in party history. The Centre Party re-entered government, supporting Labour Party Prime Minister Jonas Gahr Støre. Vedum became finance minister in the new government.

The Centre Party withdrew from the Labour government in January 2025. Labour governed as a minority government until the 2025 election. Following the Centre Party's exit from government, the Labour Party saw a rebound in the polls after former Prime Minister Jens Stoltenberg replaced Vedum as Finance Minister. In the 2025 election, the Centre Party's support collapsed, securing just nine seats (a decrease of 19) with 5.6% of the vote, the worst result in the party's history. Despite the collapse of the Centre Party, Labour, Centre, and other left-of-centre parties were able to secure a majority of seats in the Storting.

== List of party leaders ==
- Johan E. Mellbye (1920–1921)
- Kristoffer Høgset (1921–1927)
- Erik Enge (1927–1930)
- Jens Hundseid (1930–1938)
- Nils Trædal (1938–1948)
- Einar Frogner (1948–1954)
- Per Borten (1955–1967)
- John Austrheim (1967–1973)
- Dagfinn Vårvik (1973–1977)
- Gunnar Stålsett (1977–1979)
- Johan J. Jakobsen (1979–1991)
- Anne Enger Lahnstein (1991–1999)
- Odd Roger Enoksen (1999–2003)
- Åslaug Haga (2003–2008)
- Lars Peder Brekk (2008; acting)
- Liv Signe Navarsete (2008–2014)
- Trygve Slagsvold Vedum (2014–present)

== Government participation ==
Governments led by Centre Party Prime Ministers:

- The Government of Peder Kolstad 1931–1932 (minority government)
- The Government of Jens Hundseid 1932–1933 (minority government)
- The Government of Per Borten 1965–1971 (coalition of Sp, H, KrF and V)

With Prime Ministers from other parties:

- The Government of Lars Korvald (KrF), 1972–1973 (coalition of KrF, Sp and V)
- The second Government of Kåre Willoch (H), 1983–1986 (coalition of H, KrF and Sp)
- The Government of Jan P. Syse (H), 1989–1990, (coalition of H, KrF and Sp)
- The first Government of Kjell Magne Bondevik (KrF), 1997–2000 (minority government coalition of KrF, Sp and V)
- The second Government of Jens Stoltenberg (Ap), 2005–2013 (coalition of Ap, Sp and SV)
- The Government of Jonas Gahr Støre (Ap), 2021–2025 (minority government coalition of Ap, and Sp)

== Election results ==
=== Storting ===
Election	Leader	Votes	%	Seats	+/–	Position	Status
1921	Kristoffer Høgset	118,657	13.1	17 / 150	▲14	▲4th	Opposition
1924	Kristoffer Høgset	131,706	13.5	22 / 150	▲5	4th	Opposition
1927	Erik Enge	149,026	14.9	26 / 150	▲4	4th	Opposition
1930	Jens Hundseid	190,220	15.9	25 / 150	▼1	4th	Opposition (1930–1931)
1930	Jens Hundseid	190,220	15.9	25 / 150	▼1	4th	Minority (1931–1933)
1933	Jens Hundseid	173,634	13.9	23 / 150	▼2	4th'	Opposition
1936	Jens Hundseid	168,038	11.5	18 / 150	▼5	4th	External support
1945	Nils Trædal	119,362	8.0	10 / 150	▼8	▼5th	Opposition
1949 (Note: Ran on joint lists with other parties in some constituencies as it has done from 1949 to 1981. Vote numbers are only from independent Centre Party lists while vote percentage also includes the Centre Party's estimated share from joint lists (Statistics Norway estimates).)	Einar Frogner	85,418	7.9	12 / 150	▲2	▲4th	Opposition
1953	Einar Frogner	157,018	9.0	14 / 150	▲2	▼5th	Opposition
1957	Per Borten	154,761	9.3	15 / 150	▲1	▲4th	Opposition
1961	Per Borten	125,643	9.3	16 / 150	▲1	▲3rd	Opposition (1961–1963)
1961	Per Borten	125,643	9.3	16 / 150	▲1	▲3rd	Coalition (1963)
1961	Per Borten	125,643	9.3	16 / 150	▲1	▲3rd	Opposition (1963–1965)
1965	Per Borten	191,702	9.9	18 / 150	▲2	▼4th	Coalition
1969	John Austrheim	194,128	10.5	20 / 150	▲2	▲3rd	Coalition (1969–1971)
1969	John Austrheim	194,128	10.5	20 / 150	▲2	▲3rd	Opposition (1971–1972)
1969	John Austrheim	194,128	10.5	20 / 150	▲2	▲3rd	Coalition (1972–1973)
1973	Dagfinn Vårvik	146,312	11.0	21 / 155	▲1	3rd	Opposition
1977	Gunnar Stålsett	184,087	8.6	12 / 155	▼9	▼4th	Opposition
1981	Johan J. Jakobsen	103,753	6.7	11 / 155	▼1	4th	Opposition (1981–1983)
1981	Johan J. Jakobsen	103,753	6.7	11 / 155	▼1	4th	Coalition (1983–1985)
1985	Johan J. Jakobsen	171,770	6.6	12 / 157	▲1	4th	Coalition (1983–1986)
1985	Johan J. Jakobsen	171,770	6.6	12 / 157	▲1	4th	Opposition (1986–1989)
1989	Johan J. Jakobsen	171,269	6.5	11 / 165	▼1	▼6th	Coalition (1989–1990)
1989	Johan J. Jakobsen	171,269	6.5	11 / 165	▼1	▼6th	External support (1990–1993)
1993	Anne Enger Lahnstein	412,187	16.7	32 / 165	▲21	▲2nd	Opposition
1997	Anne Enger Lahnstein	204,824	7.9	11 / 165	▼21	▼5th	Coalition (1997–2000)
1997	Anne Enger Lahnstein	204,824	7.9	11 / 165	▼21	▼5th	Opposition (2000–2001)
2001	Odd Roger Enoksen	140,287	5.6	10 / 165	▼1	▼6th	Opposition
2005	Åslaug Haga	171,063	6.5	11 / 169	▲1	6th	Coalition
2009	Liv Signe Navarsete	165,006	6.2	11 / 169	Steady	▲5th	Coalition
2013	Liv Signe Navarsete	155,357	5.5	10 / 169	▼1	5th	Opposition
2017	Trygve Slagsvold Vedum	301,348	10.3	19 / 169	▲9	▲4th	Opposition
2021	Trygve Slagsvold Vedum	402,481	13.6	28 / 169	▲9	▲3rd	Coalition (2021–2025)
2021	Trygve Slagsvold Vedum	402,481	13.6	28 / 169	▲9	▲3rd	Opposition (2025)
2021	Trygve Slagsvold Vedum	402,481	13.6	28 / 169	▲9	▲3rd	External support (2025)
2025	Trygve Slagsvold Vedum	179,994	5.6	9 / 169	▼19	▼5th	External support

== Notable people ==
- Fredmund Sandvik (1951–2024), farmers' leader and politician

== See also ==
- Nordic agrarian parties
