= Darre =

Darre or Darré is a surname. Notable people with the surname include:

- André Darré (1750–1833)[, French priest and academic
- Arvid Darre Noe, anonymity name of Arvid Noe, Norwegian sailor and trucker, the earliest confirmed case of HIV/AIDS in Europe
- Bernie Darre (1939–2006), American football guard
- Hans Jørgen Darre (1803–1874), Norwegian clergyman
- Hans Jørgen Darre Hirsch (1911–1922), Norwegian barrister and writer
- Jacob Hersleb Darre (1757–1841), Norwegian vicar
- Jeanne-Marie Darré (1905–1999), French classical pianist
- Niels Stockfleth Darre (1765–1809), Norwegian military officer
- Niels Stockfleth Darre Eckhoff (1831–1914), Norwegian architect
- Richard Walther Darré (1895–1953), SS-Obergruppenführer and leading Nazi Blut und Boden ideologist
- Vincent Darré (b. 1959), French stylist and interior designer

== See also ==
- Hans Jørgen Darre-Jenssen (1864–1950), Norwegian engineer and politician
- Worm Hirsch Darre-Jenssen (1870–1945), Norwegian engineer and politician
- Tournous-Darré, a commune in the Hautes-Pyrénées department in southwestern France
