= Lauritz Jenssen =

Norwegian politician (1837–1899)

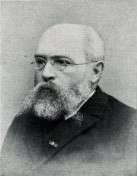
Lauritz Jenssen

Lauritz Jenssen (25 March 1837 – 7 June 1899) was a Norwegian businessperson and politician. A part of a notable business family based in and around Trondhjem, Jenssen founded Ranheims Papirfabrik, and also served one term in the Parliament of Norway.

== Personal life ==
He was born in Ranheim as a son of businessman Lauritz Dorenfeldt Jenssen (1801–1859) and his wife Karen Amalie Hagerup (1811–1890). He was a brother-in-law of Jens Jenssen, grandson of businessman Matz Jenssen and nephew of Jens Nicolai and Hans Peter Jenssen. Through his mother he was a first cousin of Prime Minister Francis Hagerup, and nephew of Henrik Steffens Hagerup.

In March 1862 Jenssen married Jørgine Wilhelmine Darre (1842–1910). She was a daughter of Bishop Hans Jørgen Darre and hailed from Klæbo. Their sons Hans Jørgen Darre-Jenssen and Worm Hirsch Darre-Jenssen both entered national politics; serving as Minister of Labour in the early twentieth century. Another son Lauritz Jenssen Dorenfeldt was a notable engineer, and had a son also named Lauritz Jenssen Dorenfeldt, a notable jurist and a daughter Margot Dorenfeldt Holtan, who in 1919 became the first woman to graduate as chemical engineer from Norwegian Institute of Technology.

== Career ==
Ranheim, the farm where Lauritz Jenssen was born, had been bought by his father in 1834. He enrolled as a student in 1854, and after graduating in machine engineering from the Polytechnische Schule Karlsruhe in 1860, Lauritz Jenssen returned to Norway. His mother, who, being a widow, had run the farm for one year, but Jenssen became manager in 1860 and owner in 1867. The farm also featured a mill and a rolling mill for copper. The mills were closed in 1897. He instead founded the cellulose factory Ranheim Cellulosefabrik, with construction starting in 1882 and operation in 1884. In 1890–1891 it was reorganized into the paper mill Ranheims Papirfabrik. Jenssen served as its technical director for some years, but the factory struggled financially and it was taken over by Christian Christophersen in 1894. Ranheim farm was not a part of the deal, and Jenssen died there in June 1899.

He was elected to the Parliament of Norway in 1880, representing the constituency of Søndre Trondhjems Amt. He only served one term. He also served as mayor of Strinden Municipality in 1888 and 1889, and was a member of the municipal council for many years, starting in 1870.

Jenssen co-founded and chaired the local branch of the Association of Hunters and Anglers. He was also among the proponents for the establishment of the Norwegian Institute of Technology. It was rejected during his lifetime but finally established in 1910.

== Legacy ==
Jenssen was a member of the Norwegian Academy of Science and Letters from 1869, and was decorated as a Knight, First Class of the Royal Norwegian Order of St. Olav and as a Knight of the Order of Vasa. A street in Strinda was named after him in 1932. The factory he founded still exists.
