= Rygh =

Rygh is a Norwegian surname. Notable people with this surname include:

- Aase Texmon Rygh, (1925-2019) Norwegian sculptor
- Anne Rygh Pedersen (born 1967), Norwegian politician
- Evald Rygh (1842-1913), Norwegian politician
- Karl Ditlev Rygh (1839-1915), Norwegian politician
- Lauritz Kristian Nilssen Rygh (1874-1950), Norwegian politician
- Oluf Rygh (1833-1899), Norwegian archaeologist, philologist and historian
- Peder Strand Rygh (1800-1868), Norwegian politician
