= Hans Jørgen Darre-Jenssen =

Norwegian politician and engineer

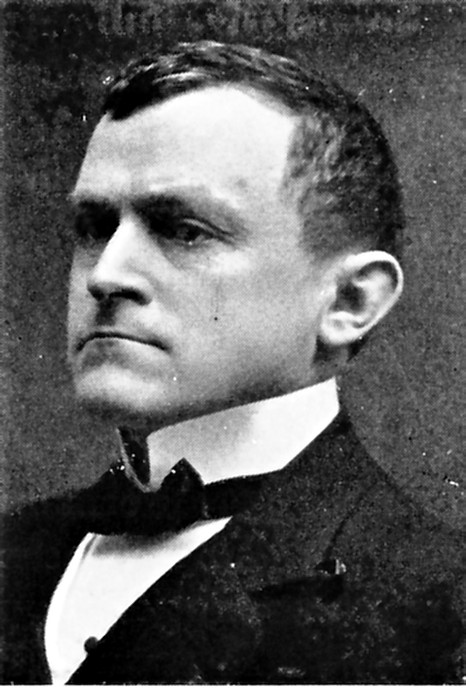

Minister of Labour
- In office 11 June 1910 – 20 February 1912
- Prime Minister: Wollert Konow
- Preceded by: Bernhard Brænne
- Succeeded by: Bernhard Brænne

Personal details
- Born: 22 June 1864 Ranheim, Sør-Trøndelag, United Kingdoms of Sweden and Norway
- Died: 26 June 1950 (aged 86) Oslo, Norway
- Party: Free-minded Liberal
- Spouse: Sigrid Støren (m. 1895)
- Relations: Worm Hirsch Darre-Jenssen (brother)
- Profession: Engineer

Hans Jørgen Darre-Jenssen (22 June 1864 – 26 June 1950) was a Norwegian engineer and politician for the Free-minded Liberal Party. He was the Minister of Labour from 1910 to 1912, and thereafter served as director of the Norwegian State Railways.

== Personal life ==
He was born in Ranheim in Strinden Municipality as a son of estate owner and politician Lauritz Jenssen (1837–1899) and Jørgine Wilhelmine Darre (1842–1910). He was a younger brother of engineer Lauritz Jenssen Dorenfeldt, and an older brother of Worm Hirsch Darre-Jenssen, who also served as Minister of Labour, from 1926 to 1928.

On the maternal side he was a great-grandson of Jacob Hersleb Darre, a founding father of the Norwegian Constitution, and a grandson of bishop Hans Jørgen Darre. On the paternal side he was a member of the Jenssen trading dynasty; as the great-grandson of Matz Jenssen, grandson of Lauritz Dorenfeldt Jenssen, grandnephew of Jens Nicolai and Hans Peter Jenssen and a second cousin of Anton and Hans Peter Jenssen. Through his brother Lauritz he was an uncle of jurist Lauritz Jenssen Dorenfeldt.

In July 1895 in Lillehammer he married Sigrid Støren (1871–1935), a daughter of a lieutenant colonel.

== Career ==
Darre-Jenssen took technical education in Trondhjem, graduating in 1886. He then stayed a few years abroad, returning to Norway to build railway lines. He was titled assistant from 1891, engineer class II from 1895 and engineer class I from 1898 to 1909. During this period he took part in the construction of the Hamar–Sell Line and the Gjøvik Line, as well as the reconstruction of the Drammen Line and Oslo Eastern Station. For the latter project he was chief of construction. He was promoted to chief engineer in 1909. The work with the Drammen Line was not finished until 1922.

Darre-Jenssen had entered politics in 1904, when he was elected to the executive committee of Kristiania city council. He only served one three-year term. In June 1910 he was appointed Minister of Labour in the cabinet Konow, replacing Bernhard Brænne in a cabinet reshuffle. The cabinet resigned in February 1912. The Liberal Left Party was also a part of the successor cabinet, Bratlie's Cabinet, but Darre-Jenssen was not picked to continue.

From 1912, then, he was a technical director of the Norwegian State Railways. He left in 1919 after a conflict with Knudsen's Second Cabinet, to become CEO of the tramway company Akersbanerne from 1919 to 1935. He was also a board member of Norsk Hovedjernbane from 1912 to 1920, and president of the Nordiska järnvägsmannasällskapet from 1920 to 1924.

Darre-Jenssen was also a member of the board of Oslo Port Authority, and from 1907 to 1910 he chaired the board of Kristiania Gasverk. He was also a member of the board of the Norwegian Red Cross, serving as its president from 1913 to 1917. He received a Red Cross honorary medal, and was decorated as a Commander with Star of the Royal Norwegian Order of St. Olav and a Knight of the Order of the Dannebrog, the Order of the Polar Star and the Order of the White Rose of Finland. He died in June 1950 in Oslo.

Political offices
Preceded by Bernhard Brænne	Norwegian Minister of Labour; 1910–1912	Succeeded by Bernhard Brænne
