= Dorenfeldt =

Dorenfeldt is a surname. Notable people with the surname include:

- Lauritz Dorenfeldt Jenssen (1801–1859), Norwegian businessperson
- Lauritz Jenssen Dorenfeldt (1863–1932), Norwegian engineer
- Lauritz Jenssen Dorenfeldt (1909–1997), Norwegian jurist
