= Lauritz Jenssen Dorenfeldt =

Lauritz Jenssen Dorenfeldt may refer to:

- Lauritz Jenssen Dorenfeldt (engineer) (1863–1932), Norwegian engineer
- Lauritz Jenssen Dorenfeldt (jurist) (1909–1997), Norwegian jurist

== See also ==
- Lauritz Dorenfeldt Jenssen (1801–1859), Norwegian businessman
