= Aulie =

Aulie is a surname. Notable people with the name include:

- Andreas Aulie (1897–1990), Norwegian jurist
- Keith Aulie (born 1989), Canadian ice hockey defenceman
- Marianne Aulie (born 1971), Norwegian painter and model
- Otto Aulie (1894–1923), Norwegian football defender
- Reidar Aulie (1904–1977), Norwegian artist
- Richard P. Aulie (born 1927) American evangelical Christian essayist
