= Lauritz Jenssen Dorenfeldt (engineer) =

Norwegian engineer (1863–1932)

Lauritz Jenssen Dorenfeldt (23 January 1863 – 3 January 1932) was a Norwegian engineer.

== Personal life ==
Lauritz Jenssen was born on 23 January 1863 at Strinda Municipality in Søndre Trondhjem county, Norway. He was the oldest of seven sons of businessman Lauritz Jenssen (1837–1899) and Jørgine Wilhelmine Darre (1842–1910). He was a brother of engineer Hans Jørgen Darre-Jenssen (1864–1950) and politician Worm Hirsch Darre-Jenssen (1870–1945) and a nephew of Bishop Hans Jørgen Darre (1803–1874). He adopted the surname Dorenfeldt in 1890.

In October 1890, he married Aagot Bødtker (1869–1963), who had worked as an auditor at the technical school in Trondheim in the 1880s, and taken classes in chemistry there. Dorenfeldt had encouraged her to take these classes so that they could discuss technical matters. She was the sister of theatre critic Sigurd Bødtker (1866–1928) and organic chemist Eyvind Bødtker (1867–1932). The couple had a daughter, Margot Dorenfeldt, (1895–1986) who in 1919 became the first woman to graduate as a chemical engineer from the Norwegian Institute of Technology and a son Lauritz Jenssen Dorenfeldt (1909 –1997) who made his career in law.

== Career ==
Dorenfeldt took the examen artium at Trondhjem Cathedral School in 1881 and graduated in 1884 with a degree in mechanical engineering at Trondhjem Technical School. That same year, he was hired in his father's factory Ranheim Cellulosefabrik By that time he had undertaken studies at the Technische Hochschule in Charlottenburg (today Technische Universität Berlin) where he graduated in 1888. He was promoted to assistant engineer in 1885 and to manager in 1888 at Ranheim Cellulosefabrik.

In 1891 the factory became the paper factory Ranheim Papirfabrikk. In 1894 he was hired as a technical director for a similar factory in Rheindürkheim, Rhineland Palatinate, and in 1902 he settled in Kristiania (now Oslo) to work with technical consulting.

He was prominent in the development of pulp and paper industry. In the technical sphere, he was a proponent for using pyrite from Norway as well as natrium sulphite in the production of cellulose. He took part in a development of the Norwegian industry from exporting cellulose and pulp, to refining and exporting paper. He co-founded a research institute in 1922 and the association Norsk Celluloseforening. He died in January 1932 at Oslo.
