= Bernhard Brænne =

Norwegian politician (1854–1927)

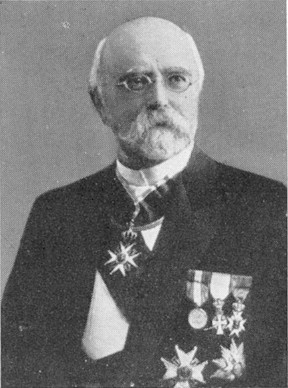

Minister of Labour
- In office 20 February 1912 – 23 August 1912
- Prime Minister: Jens Bratlie
- Preceded by: Hans Jørgen Darre-Jenssen
- Succeeded by: Nils Olaf Hovdenak
- In office 2 February 1910 – 11 June 1910
- Prime Minister: Wollert Konow
- Preceded by: Nils Claus Ihlen
- Succeeded by: Hans Jørgen Darre-Jenssen

Minister of Trade
- In office 11 June 1910 – 20 February 1912
- Prime Minister: Wollert Konow
- Preceded by: Sofus Arctander
- Succeeded by: Ambortius Lindvig

Member of the Norwegian Parliament
- In office 1 January 1916 – 31 December 1918
- Constituency: Trondhjem and Levanger
- In office 1 January 1910 – 31 December 1912
- Constituency: Trondhjem and Levanger
- In office 1 January 1904 – 31 December 1906
- Constituency: Trondhjem and Levanger
- In office 1 January 1892 – 31 December 1894
- Constituency: Trondhjem and Levanger

Personal details
- Born: Bernhard Cornelius Brænne; 12 November 1854 Trondheim, Søndre Trondheim, United Kingdoms of Sweden and Norway
- Died: 7 September 1927 (aged 72) Trondheim, Sør-Trøndelag, Norway
- Party: Conservative
- Spouse: Eline Aune (m. 1877)
- Children: Ragnhild Brænne

Bernhard Cornelius Brænne (12 November 1854 - 7 September 1927) was a Norwegian factory owner and member of the Norwegian Parliament with the Conservative Party.

== Background ==
Brænne was born in Trondheim, Norway. He was the son of Johan Sørensen Brænne (1817–71) and Karen Moe (1821–1901). His father was the owner of a factory owner in Trondheim. The factory that he inherited from his father specialized in textile production He graduated as a chemistry engineer from Trondheim Technical College (now Norwegian Institute of Technology) from 1875. He next studied chemistry and mechanical engineering at the Königlich-Sächsisches Polytechnikum (now Dresden University of Technology). In 1878 he took over the family business and expanded it into spinning, weaving and dry cleaning.

== Career ==
Brænne was involved in local politics in Trondheim as a member of the city council of Trondheim 1891–1910. He served as a member of the Norwegian parliament for several periods between and 1892 and 1918. He was appointed Minister of Labour in the cabinet of Wollert Konow on 2 February 1910, but then replaced Sofus Arctander as Minister of Trade on 11 June the same year. After the accession of the cabinet of Jens Bratlie on 20 February 1912, Brænne remained in government, again as Minister of Labour, but resigned on 23 August and was replaced by Nils Olaf Hovdenak.
