= Ranheim Papirfabrikk =

Norwegian industrial company

Coordinates: 63.4237°N 10.5276°E

Ranheim Papirfabrikk AS
- Industry: Paper industry
- Founded: 1884
- Fate: Bought by M. Peterson & Søn, 1983
- Headquarters: Ranheim, Norway
- Key people: Lauritz Jenssen (founder); Lauritz Jenssen Dorenfeldt (engineer); Christian Christophersen (owner from 1894)
- Products: Cellulose before 1891, paper after 1891
- Website: ranheim-pb.com

Ranheim Papirfabrikk AS was a Norwegian paper company which ran a paper factory of the same name in Ranheim, Trondheim, Norway.

== History ==
The construction of the factory started in 1882, and it was opened as Ranheims Cellulosefabrik in 1884 by businessperson and politician Lauritz Jenssen, a son of Lauritz Dorenfeldt Jenssen who had bought the farm Ranheim and started developing industry there. The factory utilized water from the nearby river Vikelva and an industrial railroad track, running off of the Nordland Line from Ranheim Station.

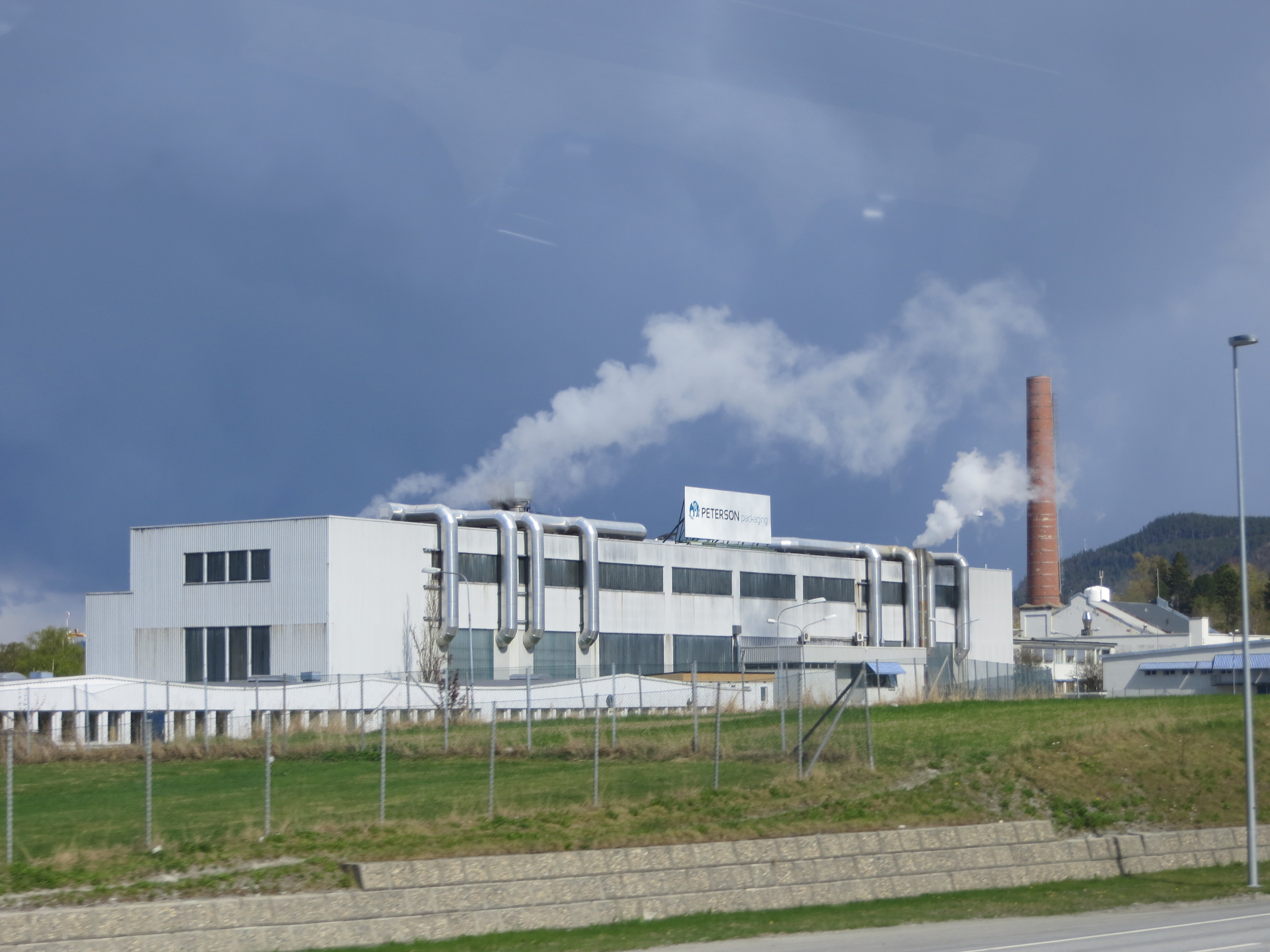
The mill in 2013

In 1891 it was changed from a cellulose factory to a paper factory, and the name changed accordingly. The founder's son Lauritz Jenssen Dorenfeldt, who worked there from 1884 to 1894, was important in this development. In 1894 the Jenssen family did not manage to run the factory any more, and the shares were taken over by Christian Christophersen.

The factory survived and was dominating in its field north of Dovrefjell, until the 1960s when it got a sizeable competitor in Nordenfjelske Treforedling. Ranheim Papirfabrikk became a part of Norske Skogindustrier in 1971. In 1983 the company was sold to the conglomerate M. Peterson & Søn, founded in 1801 in Moss. Following a later reorganization the production unit at Ranheim has been split in two; Peterson Linerboard AS, Ranheim and Peterson Emballasje AS, Ranheim, parts the two main branches Peterson Linerboard and Peterson Packaging respectively. As of 2010, the factory still exists.
