= Lauritz Jenssen Dorenfeldt (jurist) =

Norwegian jurist

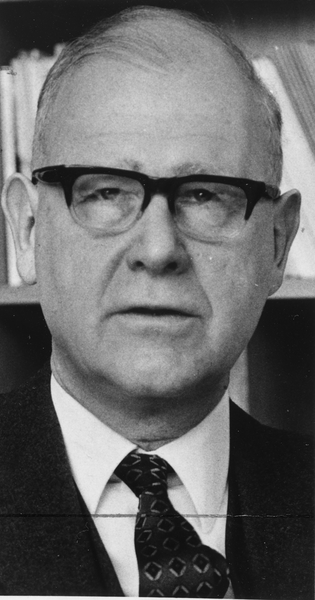
Lauritz Jenssen Dorenfeldt, 1970

Lauritz Jenssen Dorenfeldt (3 February 1909 – 15 April 1997) was a Norwegian jurist.

== Personal life ==
He was born in Kristiania as a son of engineer Lauritz Jenssen Dorenfeldt (1863–1932) and Aagot Bødtker (1869–1963). He was a grandson of Lauritz Jenssen, grandnephew of Hans Jørgen Darre and a nephew of Hans Jørgen Darre-Jenssen and Worm Hirsch Darre-Jenssen. On the maternal side he was a nephew of Sigurd Bødtker.

In 1943 he married Lucille Elise Schaaning (1920–2002), daughter of dr.med. Gustav Adolf Lammers Schaaning (1888–1963).

== Career ==
He graduated from the Royal Frederick University in 1934 with the cand.jur. degree. In his early career he worked as a junior attorney from 1935 and deputy judge in Aker District Court from 1937. During the occupation of Norway by Nazi Germany he was imprisoned.

In 1945 he was hired as an auxiliary judge in Aker District Court, and from 1947 he was a district attorney in Oslo. He also lectured in criminal law at the University of Oslo between 1957 and 1967. In 1968 he was promoted to the Norwegian Director of Public Prosecutions, a position he retained until 1979.

He was a board member of Den norske kriminalistforening, and chaired the Norwegian Fire Protection Association from 1968 to 1979. He also chaired the supervisory councils of Storebrand and Idun. He was decorated as a Commander of the Royal Norwegian Order of St. Olav and of the Order of the Polar Star. He died in April 1997 in Oslo.

== See also ==
- Trial and conviction of Fredrik Fasting Torgersen

Legal offices
| Preceded by Andreas Aulie | Norwegian Director of Public Prosecutions; 1968–1979 | Succeeded by Magnar Flornes |
