= Lauritz Dorenfeldt Jenssen =

Norwegian businessman (1801–1859)

Lauritz Dorenfeldt Jenssen (4 February 1801 – 7 June 1859) was a Norwegian businessman and politician.

He was born in Throndhjem as the son of businessman Matz Jenssen (1760–1813) and his wife Anna, née Schjelderup Dorenfeldt (1763–1846). His older brothers Jens Nicolai Jenssen and Hans Peter Jenssen, Sr. ran the family company Jenssen & Co; Jens Nicolai later founding a rivalling company Jenssen & Sønner in 1837. Lauritz Dorenfeldt Jenssen enrolled as a student in 1821, and graduated with the cand.theol. degree in 1831. However, he did not become a priest. In 1836 he bought the farm Ranheim in the parish of Strinden for 23,000 Norwegian speciedaler, and ran a "significant" industrial company here. He also served as mayor of Strinden municipality, from 1844 to 1845 and 1850 to 1853.

In July 1836, Jenssen married Karen Amalie Hagerup (1811–1890), a daughter of Caspar Peter Hagerup and sister of Henrik Steffens Hagerup. Their son Lauritz established the paper factory Ranheims Papirfabrik, and also served as a politician. Through his son, Lauritz Dorenfeldt Jenssen was the grandfather of chemical engineer Margot Dorenfeldt and politicians Hans Jørgen and Worm Hirsch Darre-Jenssen. Through his sister Nicoline, who married his wife's brother Henrik Steffens Hagerup, he was also the uncle of Prime Minister Francis Hagerup.
