= Farm name =

Farm name may refer to:

- A name given to a farm. See place name origins and toponymy.
  - Norske Gaardnavne is a 19-volume study of Norwegian farm names
- A part of the full personal name which constitutes the name of a farm.
  - Surnames by country § Scandinavia for Scandinavian farm names
  - Hofname for German farm names
