= Matz Jenssen =

Norwegian businessman

Matz Jenssen (30 October 1760 – 12 August 1813) was a Norwegian businessman.

Originally a seamaster, Jenssen settled in Throndhjem in 1790. Here, he founded his own trading company Jenssen & Co, which evolved into a trade dynasty in the city. Upon his death in 1813, his wife Anna, née Schjelderup Dorenfeldt (1763–1846) took over. The couple had four sons and four daughters; his two oldest sons Jens Nicolai and Hans Peter took over the company upon finishing school, while his third son Anthon P. Jenssen became an estate owner. Jens Nicolai Jenssen left the family company in 1837 to found a rivalling company Jenssen & Sønner.

Jens Nicolai had three sons and three daughters; the oldest son Christian Mathias was a notable businessperson whereas one daughter married a member of the Getz family. Hans Peter married a sister of John Moses, and fathered the businessman Anthon Mathias Jenssen. Matz' fourth son, Lauritz Dorenfeldt Jenssen, was the father of Lauritz Jenssen and grandfather of Hans Jørgen and Worm Hirsch Darre-Jenssen. His daughter Nicoline married Henrik Steffens Hagerup, son of Caspar Peter Hagerup, nephew of Henrik Steffens and father of Prime Minister Francis Hagerup.
