= Konow's Cabinet =

Government of Norway from 1910 to 1912

- Cabinet of Norway

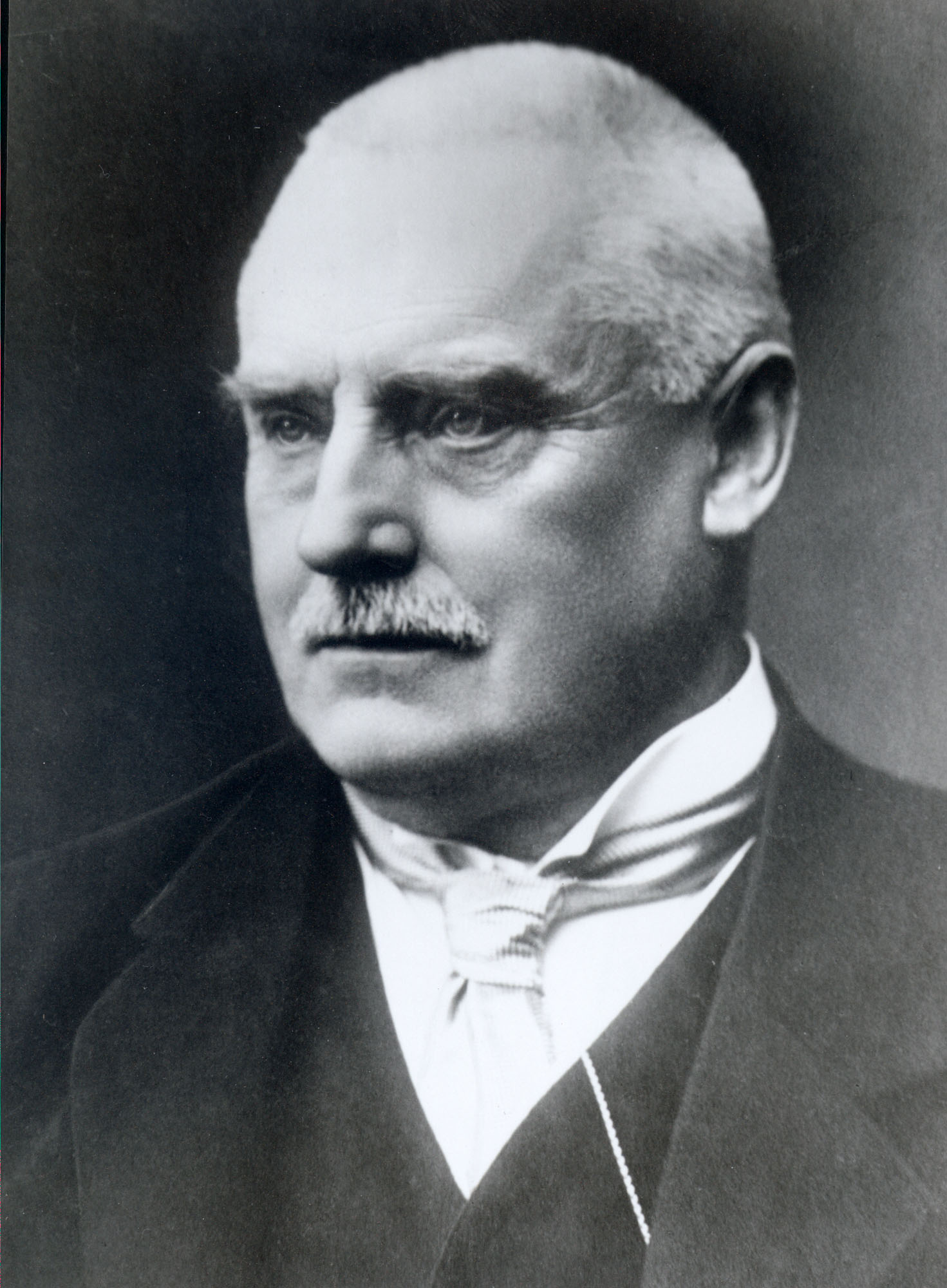
- Prime Minister Konow
- Date formed: 2 February 1910
- Date dissolved: 20 February 1912

People and organisations
- Head of state: Haakon VII of Norway
- Head of government: Wollert Konow
- No. of ministers: 10
- Member party: Free-minded Liberal Party; Conservative Party
- Status in legislature: Coalition Majority government

History
- Incoming formation: 1909 parliamentary election
- Outgoing formation: Government crisis
- Election: 1909 parliamentary election
- Legislature term: 1910–1913
- Predecessor: Knudsen's First Cabinet
- Successor: Bratlie's Cabinet

Konow's Cabinet was a Norwegian cabinet, formed by a coalition of the Conservative Party and the Free-minded Liberal Party. It was in office from 2 February 1910 to 20 February 1912.

== Cabinet members ==
Cabinet
Portfolio	Minister	Took office	Left office	Party
Prime Minister; Minister of Auditing	Wollert Konow	2 February 1910	20 February 1912	Free-minded Liberal
Minister of Foreign Affairs	Johannes Irgens (Note: Irgens was a member of the Free-minded Liberal Party before joining the Conservative Party. He assumed office as foreign minister as a Free-minded Liberal.)	2 February 1910	20 February 1912	Conservative
Minister of Justice and the Police	Herman Scheel	2 February 1910	20 February 1912	Conservative
Minister of Finance and Customs	Abraham Berge	2 February 1910	20 February 1912	Free-minded Liberal
Minister of Defence	Karl Bull	2 February 1910	20 February 1912	Conservative
Minister of Agriculture	Wollert Konow	2 February 1910	1 March 1910	Free-minded Liberal
Minister of Agriculture	Bernt Holtsmark	1 March 1910	20 February 1912	Free-minded Liberal
Minister of Education and Church Affairs	Just Qvigstad	2 February 1910	20 February 1912	Conservative
Minister of Trade	Sofus Arctander	2 February 1910	11 June 1910	Free-minded Liberal
Minister of Trade	Bernhard Brænne	11 June 1910	20 February 1912	Conservative
Minister of Labour	Bernhard Brænne	2 February 1910	11 June 1910	Conservative
Minister of Labour	Hans Jørgen Darre-Jenssen	11 June 1910	20 February 1912	Free-minded Liberal

== State Secretary ==
Not to be confused with the modern title State Secretary. The old title State Secretary, used between 1814 and 1925, is now known as Secretary to the Government (Regjeringsråd).

- Nils Otto Hesselberg
