= Bratlie's Cabinet =

Government of Norway from 1912 to 1913

- Cabinet of Norway

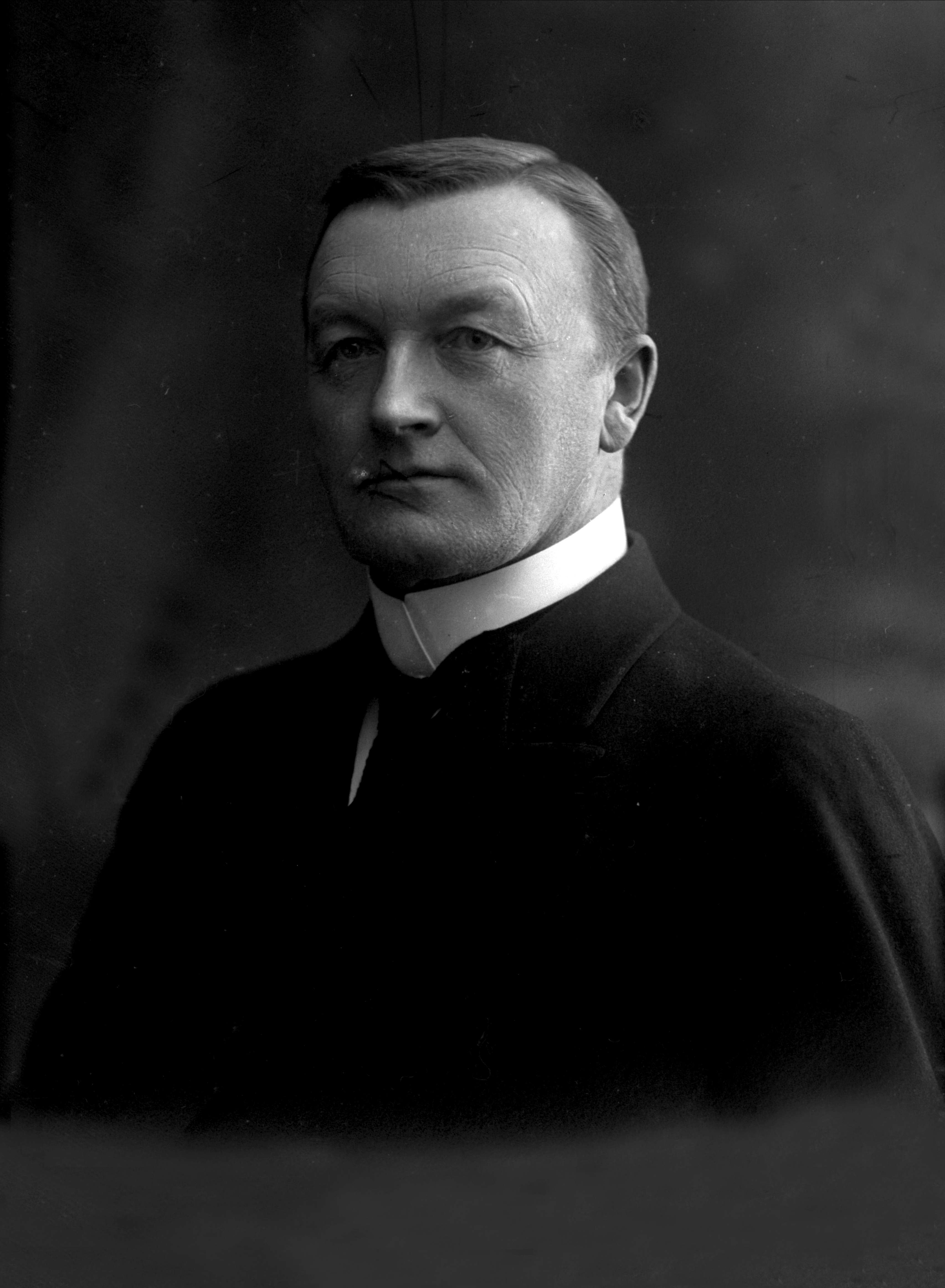
- Prime Minister Bratlie in March 1912.
- Date formed: 20 February 1912
- Date dissolved: 31 January 1913

People and organisations
- Head of state: Haakon VII of Norway
- Head of government: Jens Bratlie
- No. of ministers: 9
- Member party: Free-minded Liberal Party; Conservative Party
- Status in legislature: Coalition

History
- Incoming formation: Change of government after government crisis
- Outgoing formation: 1912 parliamentary election
- Election: 1912 parliamentary election
- Legislature term: 1910–1913
- Predecessor: Konow's Cabinet
- Successor: Knudsen's Second Cabinet

Bratlie's Cabinet was a Norwegian cabinet, formed by a coalition of the Conservative Party and the Free-minded Liberal Party. It sat from 20 February 1912 to 31 January 1913.

== Cabinet members ==
Cabinet
Portfolio	Minister	Took office	Left office	Party
Prime Minister; Minister of Auditing; Minister of Defence	Jens Bratlie	20 February 1912	31 January 1913	Conservative
Minister of Foreign Affairs	Johannes Irgens	20 February 1912	31 January 1913	Conservative
Minister of Justice and the Police	Fredrik Stang	20 February 1912	31 January 1913	Conservative
Minister of Finance and Customs	Fredrik Ludvig Konow	20 February 1912	31 January 1913	Free-minded Liberal
Minister of Agriculture	Erik Enge	20 February 1912	31 January 1913	Free-minded Liberal
Minister of Education and Church Affairs	Edvard Liljedahl	20 February 1912	31 January 1913	Conservative
Minister of Trade	Ambortius Lindvig	20 February 1912	31 January 1913	Free-minded Liberal
Minister of Labour	Bernhard Brænne	20 February 1912	23 August 1912	Conservative
Minister of Labour	Nils Olaf Hovdenak	23 August 1912	31 January 1913	Conservative
