= Per Almaas =

Norwegian politician (1898–1991)

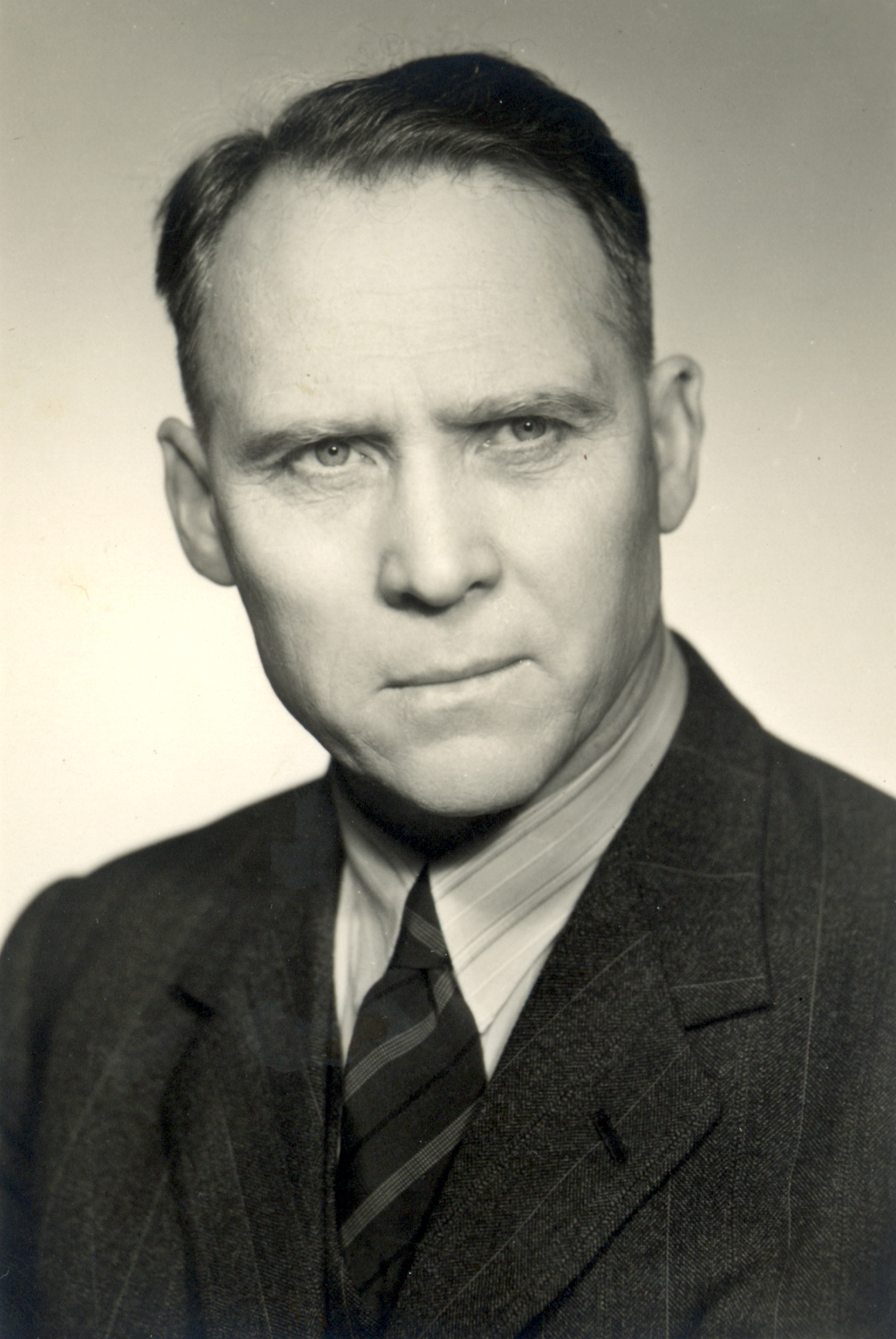

Per Almaas (8 March 1898 – 25 July 1991) was a Norwegian politician for the Labour Party.

He was born in Selbu Municipality. He was elected to the Norwegian Parliament from Sør-Trøndelag in 1950, but was not re-elected in 1954.

Almaas was a member of the municipal council of Strinda Municipality between 1928 and 1959, except for a period between 1940 and 1945 during the German occupation of Norway. He served as mayor of Strinda Municipality from 1937 to 1940 and 1945 to 1955. From 1945 to 1947 he was also a member of Sør-Trøndelag county council. He chaired the local party chapter from 1936 to 1937 and the county chapter from 1937 to 1946.

Outside politics he was a school teacher by education, eventually advancing to become school director in Nidaros school district from 1954 to 1962 and in Sør-Trøndelag from 1963 to 1968.
