= Bernhard Ludvig Essendrop =

Norwegian politician and priest

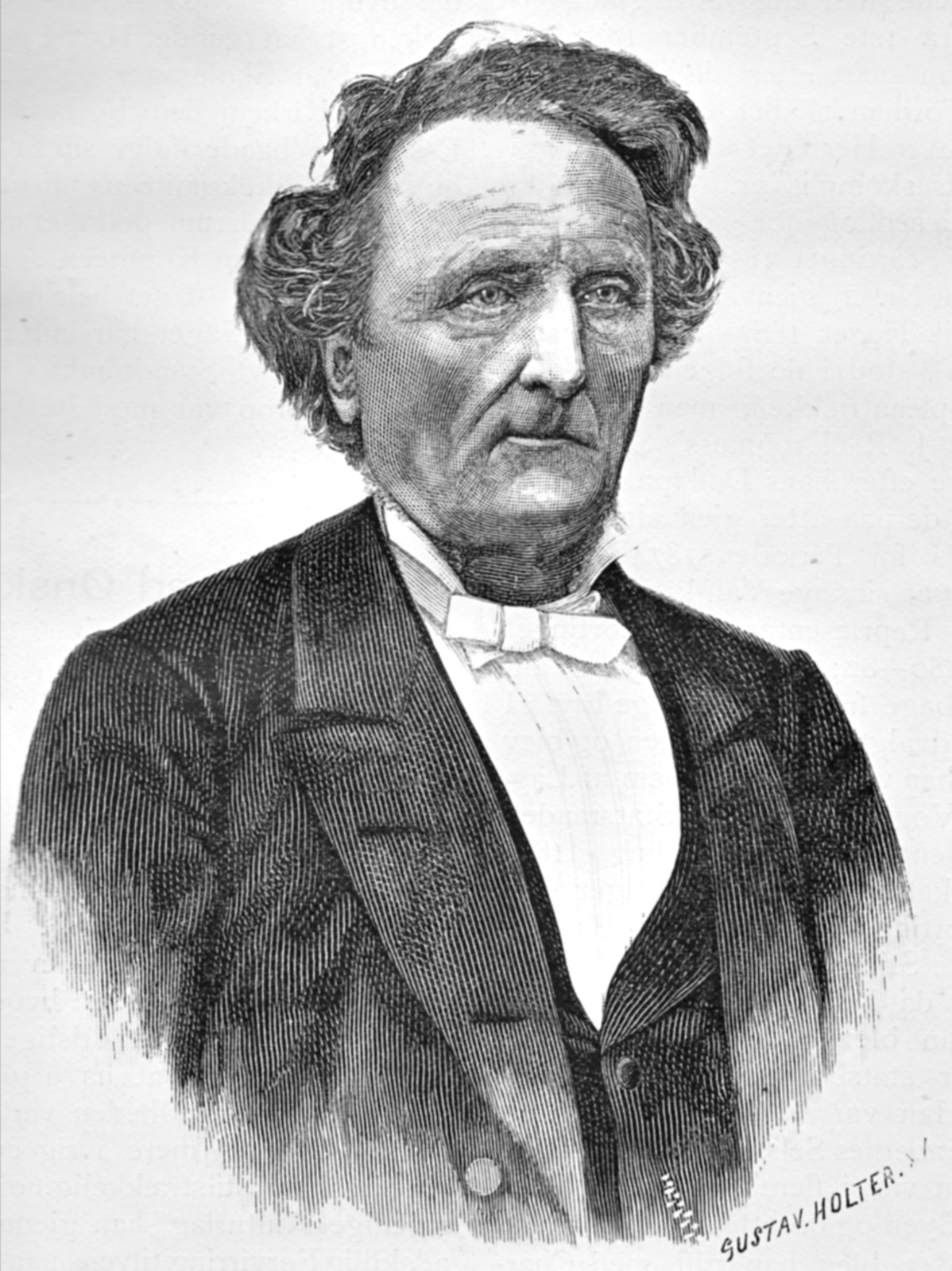
Bernhard Ludvig Essendrop.

Bernhard Ludvig Essendrop (21 December 1812 – 13 March 1891) was a Norwegian politician and priest in the Church of Norway.

== Early life ==
He was born in Christiania (now Oslo) and was the brother of Bishop Carl Peter Parelius Essendrop. He served as a priest in Søndre Throndhjems Amt (now Sør-Trøndelag). He was parish priest of Strinda Church and Bakke Church, near the city of Trondheim (1851 to 1876) and the mayor of Strinda Municipality during two periods (1862-1865) and (1868-1873).

== Political career ==
He was elected to the Norwegian Parliament in 1862, 1865, 1871 and 1874, representing his county. He served as President of the Lagting during the third term, and President of the Storting from 1874. He was originally among the prominent liberals, a group which also included Johan Sverdrup, Johannes Steen and Ole Richter, but later became more moderate/conservative. After he became dean of Nidaros Cathedral in the Diocese of Nidaros in Trondheim, he was elected from the constituency of Trondhjem og Levanger in 1877 and 1880.

== Later life ==
Essendrop also served as praeses of the Royal Norwegian Society of Sciences and Letters from 1874 to 1883. He died in March 1891.

Political offices
Preceded by P. Daniel B. W. Kildal; Johan Sverdrup	President of the Storting; 1874–1882 (with others)	Succeeded by Johannes Steen
Academic offices
Preceded by Andreas Grimelund	Praeses of the Royal Norwegian Society of Sciences and Letters; 1874–1883	Succeeded by Karl Ditlev Rygh
