= Andreas Grimelund =

Norwegian bishop

Right Reverend Andreas Grimelund
- Bishop
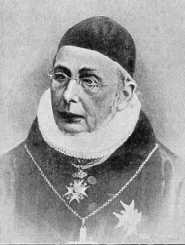
- Church: Church of Norway
- Diocese: Nidaros

Personal details
- Born: 26 January 1812 Aker, Norway
- Died: 3 January 1896 (aged 83) Kristiania, Norway
- Denomination: Christian
- Parents: Hans Hansen Grimelund; Gunhild Aslaksdatter
- Spouse: Julie Augusta Kjelsen (1838–1896)
- Occupation: Priest
- Education: cand.theol. (1835)

Andreas Grimelund (26 January 1812 – 3 January 1896) was a Norwegian bishop.

The son of a farmer in Aker, he graduated as cand.theol. in 1835, and became a residing chaplain in Nannestad in 1844 and Ullensaker in 1847. He was a teacher at the theological seminary in Christiania starting in 1851, and was appointed vicar in Gjerpen Municipality in 1856. He was appointed Bishop of the Diocese of Throndhjem (Nidaros) in 1860, and assumed that office on 19 July 1861. He retired in 1883, and died in 1896 in Kristiania.

He also served as praeses of the Royal Norwegian Society of Sciences and Letters from 1865 to 1870 and 1872 to 1874. The road Biskop Grimelunds vei in Vinderen has been named for him.

Church of Norway
| Preceded by Hans Jørgen Darre | Bishop of Trondhjem; 1861–1883 | Succeeded by Nils Jacob Laache |
Academic offices
| Preceded by Christian Petersen | Praeses of the Royal Norwegian Society of Sciences and Letters; 1865–1870 | Succeeded by Hans Jørgen Darre |
| Preceded by Hans Jørgen Darre | Praeses of the Royal Norwegian Society of Sciences and Letters; 1872–1874 | Succeeded by Bernhard Ludvig Essendrop |
