= Amund B. Larsen =

Norwegian linguist

Amund Bredesen Larsen (15 December 1849 – 27 April 1928) was a Norwegian linguist. He was one of the first to study Norwegian dialects and made the first dialect map of any Nordic country.

== Early and personal life ==
He was born in Grue as the son of bailiff Christoffer Larsen and his wife Olea Bredesen Ramsøyen, and was named after his maternal grandfather. He was an older brother of Bastian Reinhold Larsen. He grew up in Grue, but in 1866 he moved to Christiania and took his examen artium. He eventually graduated with the cand.philol. degree in 1878. In June the same year he married Henriette Caroline Sætre; the marriage lasted until her death in 1881. He then married the Danish-born Anna Cathrine Lund in May 1887.

== Career ==
Larsen worked as a teacher in Trondhjem from 1879 and in Arendal from 1883. He published two works about dialects in Trondhjem and Trøndelag: Oplysninger om Dialekter i Selbu og Guldalen (1882) and Oversigt over de trondhjemske dialekters slægtskabsforhold (1886). In 1894 he took the dr.philos. degree with the thesis Lydlæren i den solørske Dialekt især i dens Forhold til Oldsproget, on the dialect of his native Solør. Oversigt over de norske bygdemål, an overview of Norwegian rural dialects, followed in 1897, when Larsen had managed to visit most of Norway. He also made the first dialect map of any Nordic country, in 1887.

In 1899 he applied for a vacant professorship at the University of Kristiania, but Marius Hægstad was appointed. Larsen worked as a teacher for two more years, until getting a state research scholarship in 1901. From 1902 he was engaged with describing Norwegian city dialects, a task on which he would spend most of his remaining life. Kristiania bymaal came in 1907, then followed Bergens bymaal released with Gerhard Stoltz in two volumes in 1911 and 1912, and Stavanger bymål with Mandius Berntsen in 1925. He also wrote volume eight of Norske Gaardnavne, about farm names in Nedenes, in 1905. He was a fellow of the Norwegian Academy of Science and Letters.

He died in April 1928 in Bærum, having bought a lot at Jar two years earlier. He built the house at 7 Kringsjåveien, Jar, prior to his death which looked much as it had when he built it up until 2009. His son of the same name followed in his footsteps as a dialect scholar, but died already in 1929.
