= Hans Jørgen Darre =

Norwegian clergyman

Right Reverend Hans Jørgen Darre
- Bishop
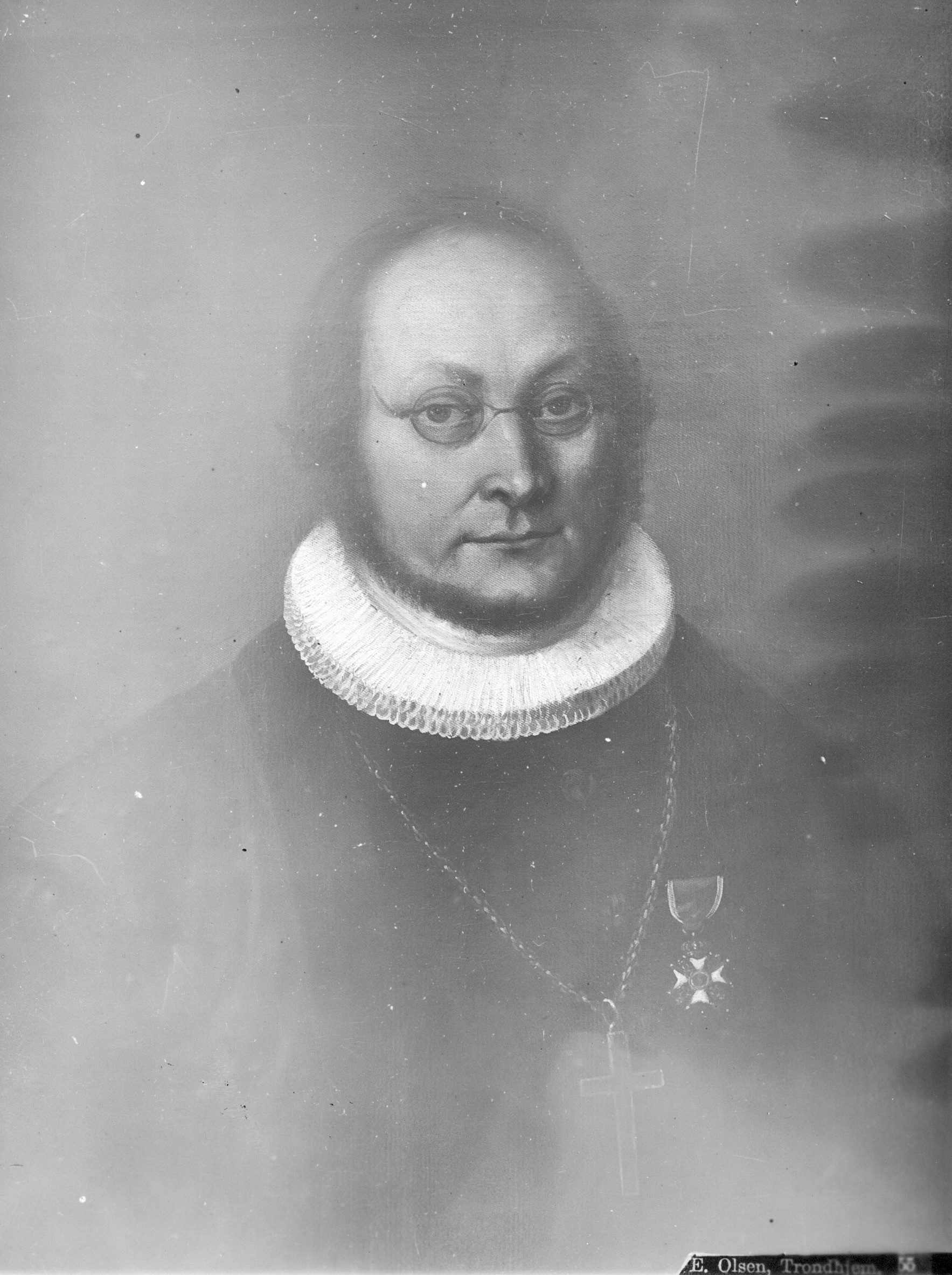
- Church: Church of Norway
- Diocese: Nidaros

Personal details
- Born: 27 September 1803 Klæbu, Norway
- Died: 11 March 1874 (aged 70) Miraflores, Spain
- Denomination: Christian
- Parents: Jacob Hersleb Darre; Louise Caroline Steenbuch
- Spouse: Ida Wilhelmine Dessen (1833–1849)
- Occupation: Priest
- Education: cand.theol. (1827)

Hans Jørgen Darre (27 September 1803 – 11 March 1874) was a Norwegian clergyman and Bishop of Nidaros.

Darre was born at Klæbu in Søndre Trondhjem county, Norway. He was the son of the vicar of Klæbo Church and constitutional founding father, Jacob Hersleb Darre. He graduated as cand.theol. in 1827 and succeeded his father as vicar of Klæbu Church in 1833. He was the dean in the district of Dalerne from 1843 to 1848, and in March 1849 he took over as Bishop of the Diocese of Trondhjem (Nidaros). He retired in 1860 with a 1000 speciedaler pension. In 1872, he moved to a town near the Spanish-Portuguese border, where his daughter's husband worked in a mine. Hans Jørgen Darre died in Miraflores, Spain during 1874, his body brought back to Norway in December 1883.

In Throndhjem, he was a member of the Royal Norwegian Society of Sciences and Letters. He served as praeses of the society from 1851 to 1855 and 1870 to 1872. He was a Knight of the Order of St. Olav.

One of his daughters, Jørgine Wilhelmine, married Lauritz Jenssen, a descendant of Matz Jenssen and Lauritz Dorenfeldt Jenssen. Through her, Hans Jørgen Darre was the grandfather of politicians Hans Jørgen Darre-Jenssen and Worm Hirsch Darre-Jenssen.

Church of Norway
Preceded by Hans Riddervold	Bishop of Trondhjem; 1849–1860	Succeeded by Andreas Grimelund
Academic offices
Preceded by Frederik Moltke Bugge	Praeses of the Royal Norwegian Society of Sciences and Letters; 1851–1855	Succeeded by Christian Petersen
Preceded by Andreas Grimelund	Praeses of the Royal Norwegian Society of Sciences and Letters; 1870–1872	Succeeded by Andreas Grimelund
