= Olav Garvik =

Norwegian journalist

- Born: 21 March 1944 (age 82); Ogna, Norway
- Education: University of Bergen
- Occupation: Journalist
- Employer: Bergens Tidende

Olav Garvik (born 21 March 1944) is a Norwegian journalist and biographer. He spent most of his career as journalist for the newspaper Bergens Tidende.

== Career ==
Born in Ogna on 21 March 1944, Garvik graduated as cand.mag. from the University of Bergen in 1969.

He worked as journalist for the newspaper Bergens Tidende from 1969 to 1978. He was chief editor of the newspaper Porsgrunns Dagblad in 1979. From 1980 to 2009 he was again assigned to Bergens Tidende, where he assumed various positions. He retired from the newspaper in 2009, about forty years after his first assignment.

His books include Da Venstre sprakk from 1982, Kristelig Folkeparti mellom tro og makt (1983), and biographies of the politicians Henrik Ameln, Wollert Konow, Bent Røiseland and Lars Sponheim.
