= Richard P. Aulie =

Richard P. Aulie (1927 – December 6, 2006) was an American educator and evangelical Christian. A high school biology teacher, he was a doctoral Yale University graduate in the history of science.

His essays and reviews such as "Evolution and Special Creation: Historical Aspects of the Controversy" from Proceedings of the American Philosophical Society and "A Reader's Guide to Of Pandas and People" have been cited in scholarly works and influential proceedings such as Kitzmiller v. Dover Area School District. Aulie died on December 6, 2006.

== Selected publication ==
- "The Cambrian Explosion, Intelligent Design, and the Growing Threat for Biology Education. American scientific Affiliation Convention. 27 July 2003.
- "The Guide for the Perplexed: An Unforeseen Overture to Science in Twelfth-Century Cairo". Perspectives on Science and Christian Faith 50. June 1998. pp. 122–134.
- "The Doctrine of Special Creation Part I. The Design Argument", Part II, Part III, Part IV.
