= Peder Strand Rygh =

Norwegian politician

Peder Strand Rygh (7 August 1800 – 15 April 1868) was a Norwegian politician.

He was elected to the Norwegian Parliament in 1839, 1842, 1845, 1851, 1854, 1857, 1862 and 1865, representing the rural constituency of Nordre Trondhjems Amt. He worked as a bailiff, and later bank director.

He hailed from Verdalen. Together with Ingeborg Marie Bentsen (1809–1878) he had a son Oluf Rygh, who achieved recognition as an archeologist and historian.
