= Norske Gaardnavne =

Norske Gaardnavne (English: Norwegian Farm Names) is a 19-volume set of books based on a manuscript prepared from 1897 to 1924 by Oluf Rygh, a noted professor of archaeology, philology, and history at the University of Oslo. The book contains a standardized notation, information on pronunciation, historical forms, and the etymology for recorded gaardnavne (estate names, farm names, and manor names) in Norway. It was developed by detailed compilation of the various written and oral records of land ownership. It is the standard that establishes place names in Norway. Documenting over 45,000 farm names and related information in 1886, it became the inspiration for similar studies in Sweden and Denmark.

== Work of the commission ==
The Norwegian Stortinget, in an act of 6 June 1863, commissioned a general revision of public register that defines Norwegian public and private lands to allow consistent land ownership records and to update the basis for taxation in Norway (a cadastre). The work was intended to correct inconsistencies and errors in place names. In 1878 the professors Sophus Bugge and Oluf Rygh, and the dean Johan Fritzner were named as members of a commission to revise the names of recorded property.

Several issues complicated this effort:

- Although various land records existed (e.g., Aslak Bolts jordebok from c. 1433, Gautes jordebok from 1491, and Olav Engelbrektssons jordebok from 1533), there was no comprehensive record.
- Place names evolved as the language of record shifted from Old Norwegian to Danish, which became the standard written language of Norway between the 16th and the 19th centuries.
- No officially sanctioned standard of spoken Norwegian existed, and most Norwegians spoke their own dialect, resulting in significant variations in usage.

=== Sources for place names ===
Because spoken names evolve, the most useful etymological sources for place names are typically the oldest written sources. Hence the commission reviewed a number of older sources including old land records and the various letters and documents that comprise the Diplomatarium Norvegicum. However, many of the place names predate written records by over 1,000 years, complicating the process. Further, for large parts of the country there were no formal land records until the official record of 1723.

One of the commission's main techniques for establishing names was through recording the oral pronunciation. To accomplish this, the commission studied pronunciations used among common people in everyday conversations. Differences were observed regionally as well as between urban and remote areas. However they found consistent relationships between the current verbal forms and the original names as found in both the current parish records and the older records.

=== Analysis of farm names ===
Etymological analysis identified the grammatical form of names, including gender, number, grammatical case, and definite or indefinite article. Where records of earlier names exist, the phonetic changes through time are analyzed. The analysis identified derivations from a variety of sources, including:

- Names derived from the physical features of the area: hills, slopes, passes, peninsula points, islands, waterfalls, lakes, surfaces, etc.
- Names derived from the use of the land: ports, roads, etc.
- Name derived from the characteristic ground cover: trees, shrubs, and plants
- Name related to animals and wildlife
- Name related to how the farm use including buildings on the farm and other human works
- Name derived from older words for home or cultivated land
- Name derived from the use of the farm or the farm history
- Name associated with folk religion: pagan religious sites and practices
- Comparison name, for example. with a piece of clothing, etc., or with body parts, animals, or tools
- Name derived from rivers and river features
- Name that contains the name or nickname of an owner
- Complimentary and derogatory names

== Publication ==
After the initial manuscript was completed in 1892, the material was submitted to the National Archival Services of Norway. Interest in the work was so great that in 1896 the parliament appropriated funding to publish it. In 1897, the first volume in the series Norske Gaardnavne went to press.

Norske Gaardnavne was released in multiple volumes, with one or more volumes for each county and a separate volume with the preface and introduction, so people could buy individual volumes for areas in which they were interested. When Oluf Rygh died, the introductory volume and the first two county volumes had been published (for Smaalenenes, now Østfold, and Akershus). Volumes 3 and 4 were essentially finished. The manuscript for subsequent volumes were edited by Albert Kjær (volumes 4 [Part 2], 6, 7, 9, 12, and 19), Hjalmar Falk (volume 5), Amund B. Larsen (volume 8), Magnus Olsen (volumes 10 and 11), and Karl Ditlev Rygh (volumes 13, 14, 15, 16, and 17). In 1924 Just Knud Qvigstad and Magnus Olsen released an eighteenth, county-specific volume covering Finnmark.

Multiple editions of the work have subsequently been printed. With the support of the Arts Council Norway and nine counties, Norske Gaardnavne has been converted to an online digital database, which is available to the public for research.

== List of volumes in Norske Gaardnavne ==
Volume	Title	Author(s)	Publication date	Translated title (using modern counties)	Link to book online (in Norwegian)
	Forord og innledning	O. Rygh	1898	Foreword and introduction	Read online
I	Smaalenenes Amt	O. Rygh	1897	Østfold County	Read online
II	Akershus Amt	O. Rygh	1898	Akershus County	Read online
III	Hedemarkens Amt	O. Rygh	1900	Eastern Innlandet County (old Hedmark)	Read online
IV-1	Kristians Amt	O. Rygh	1900	Western Innlandet County (vol. 1) (old Oppland)	Read online
IV-2	Kristians Amt	O. Rygh with A. Kjær	1902	Western Innlandet County (vol. 2) (old Oppland)	Read online
V	Buskeruds Amt	O. Rygh with Hj. Falk	1909	Buskerud County	Read online
VI	Jarlsberg og Larviks Amt	O. Rygh with A. Kjær	1907	Vestfold County	Read online
VII	Bratsberg Amt	O. Rygh with A. Kjær	1914	Telemark County	Read online
VIII	Nedenes Amt	O. Rygh with Amund B. Larsen	1905	Eastern Agder County (old Aust-Agder)	Read online
IX	Lister og Mandals Amt	O. Rygh with A. Kjær	1912	Western Agder County (old Vest-Agder)	Read online
X	Stavanger Amt	O. Rygh with Magnus Olsen	1915	Rogaland County	Read online
XI	Søndre Bergenhus Amt	O. Rygh with Magnus Olsen	1910	Southern Vestland County (old Hordaland)	Read online
XII	Nordre Bergenhus Amt	O. Rygh with A. Kjær	1919	Northern Vestland County (old Sogn og Fjordane)	Read online
XIII	Romsdals Amt	O. Rygh with K. Rygh	1908	Møre og Romsdal County	Read online
XIV	Søndre Trondhjems Amt	O. Rygh, with K. Rygh	1901	Southern Trøndelag County (old Sør-Trøndelag)	Read online
XV	Nordre Trondhjems Amt	O. Rygh with K. Rygh	1903	Northern Trøndelag County (old Nord-Trøndelag)	Read online
XVI	Nordlands Amt	O. Rygh with K. Rygh	1905	Nordland County	Read online
XVII	Troms Amt	O. Rygh with K. Rygh	1911	Troms County	Read online
XVIII	Finmarkens Amt	J. Qvigstad & Magnus Olsen	1924	Finnmark County	Read online
XIX	Fællesregister		1936	Errata	Read online

== See also ==
- Searchable database of all the volumes
