= Karl Ditlev Rygh =

Norwegian archaeologist and politician

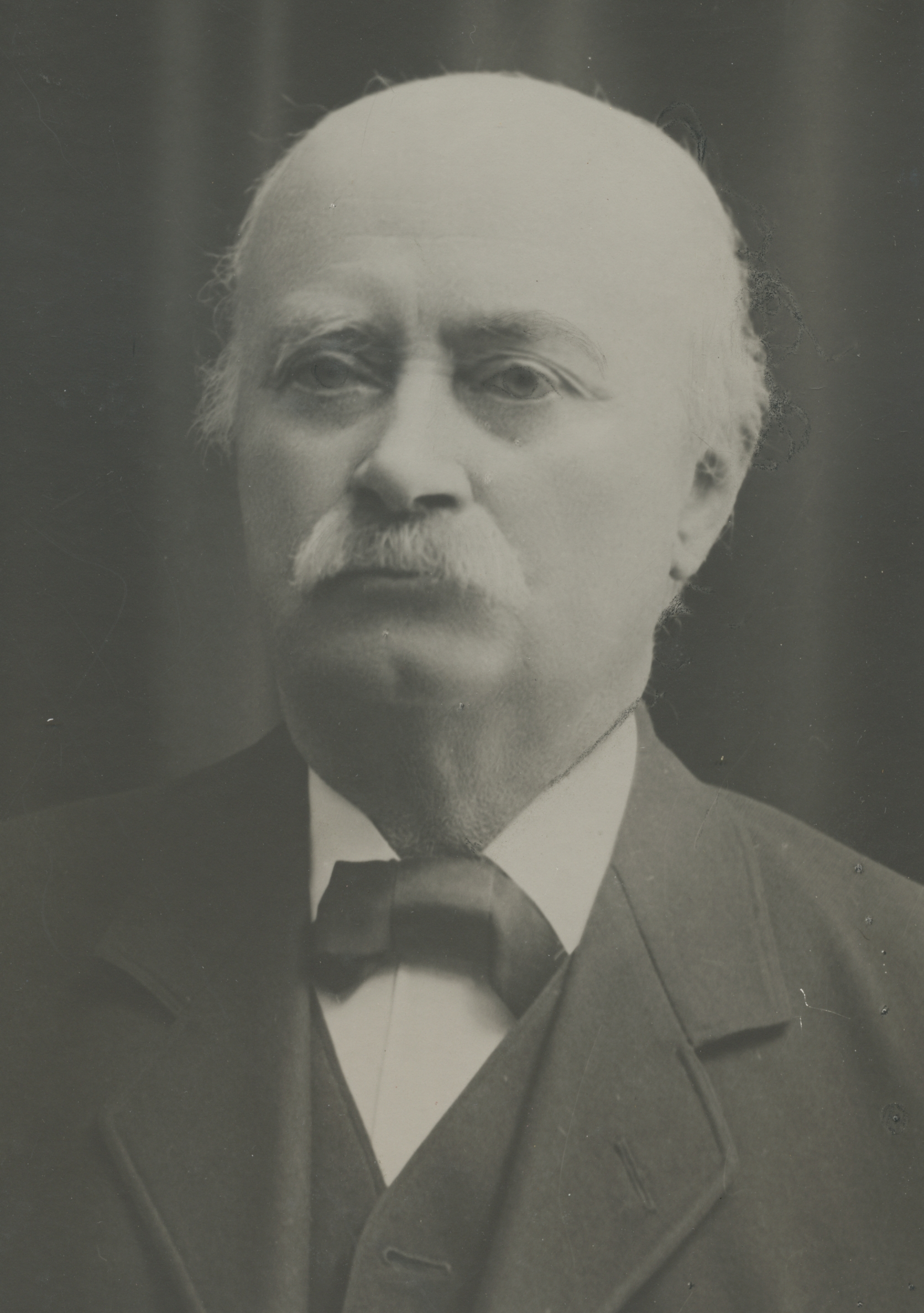
Karl Rygh

Karl Ditlev Rygh (7 June 1839 – 10 March 1915) was a Norwegian archaeologist and politician for the Conservative Party.

He was born in Verdal Municipality, and was the brother of Evald and Oluf Rygh. He graduated as cand.philol. in 1863. He was hired as a teacher at Trondheim Cathedral School in 1866, and worked as headmaster there from 1887 to 1899. From 1868 he was a member of the Royal Norwegian Society of Sciences and Letters; he served as praeses of the organization from 1883 to 1897. As an archaeologist Rygh specialized in Norway north of Dovrefjell, especially Trøndelag. When his brother Oluf died, Karl Ditlev Rygh helped finish his main work, the nineteen-volume Norske Gaardnavne.

He was elected to the Norwegian Parliament in 1886, 1889 and 1892, representing the constituency of Trondhjem og Levanger. He had served as a deputy representative during the term 1883–1885.

Academic offices
Preceded by Bernhard Ludvig Essendrop	Praeses of the Royal Norwegian Society of Sciences and Letters; 1883–1897	Succeeded by Johannes Sejersted
