= Oluf Rygh =

Norwegian archaeologist

Oluf Rygh (5 September 1833 – 19 August 1899) was a noted Norwegian archaeologist, philologist and historian. Oluf Rygh is recognized as one of the founders of professional archaeology in Norway. He led the 1867 excavation of the Tune ship (Norwegian: Tuneskipet)

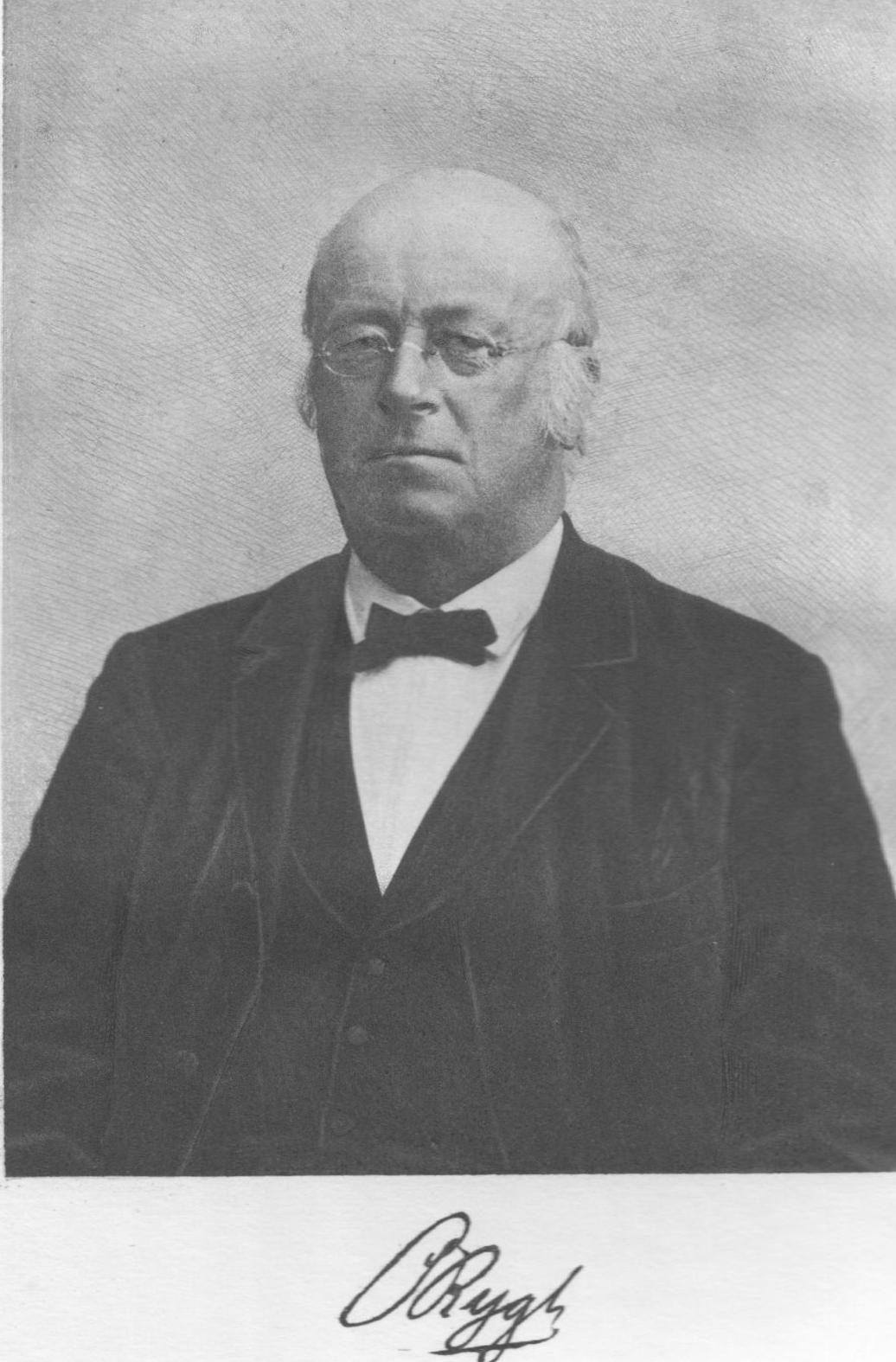
Oluf Rygh photo by Ludvig Forbech

== Background ==
Oluf Rygh was born in Verdal in Nordre Trondheim county, Norway. His parents were Peder Strand Rygh (1800–1868) and Ingeborg Marie Bentsen (1809–1878). He was the older brother of banker Evald Rygh (1842–1913) and member of Parliament Karl Ditlev Rygh (1839–1915). Oluf Rygh attended the Trondhjem Cathedral School in 1850 and went to the University of Christiania to study philology, where he graduated in 1856. In 1858, while a teacher at Nissens Skole in Christiania, he was a research fellow for history. Later he was a professor of classical philology, history and Scandinavian languages.

== Career ==
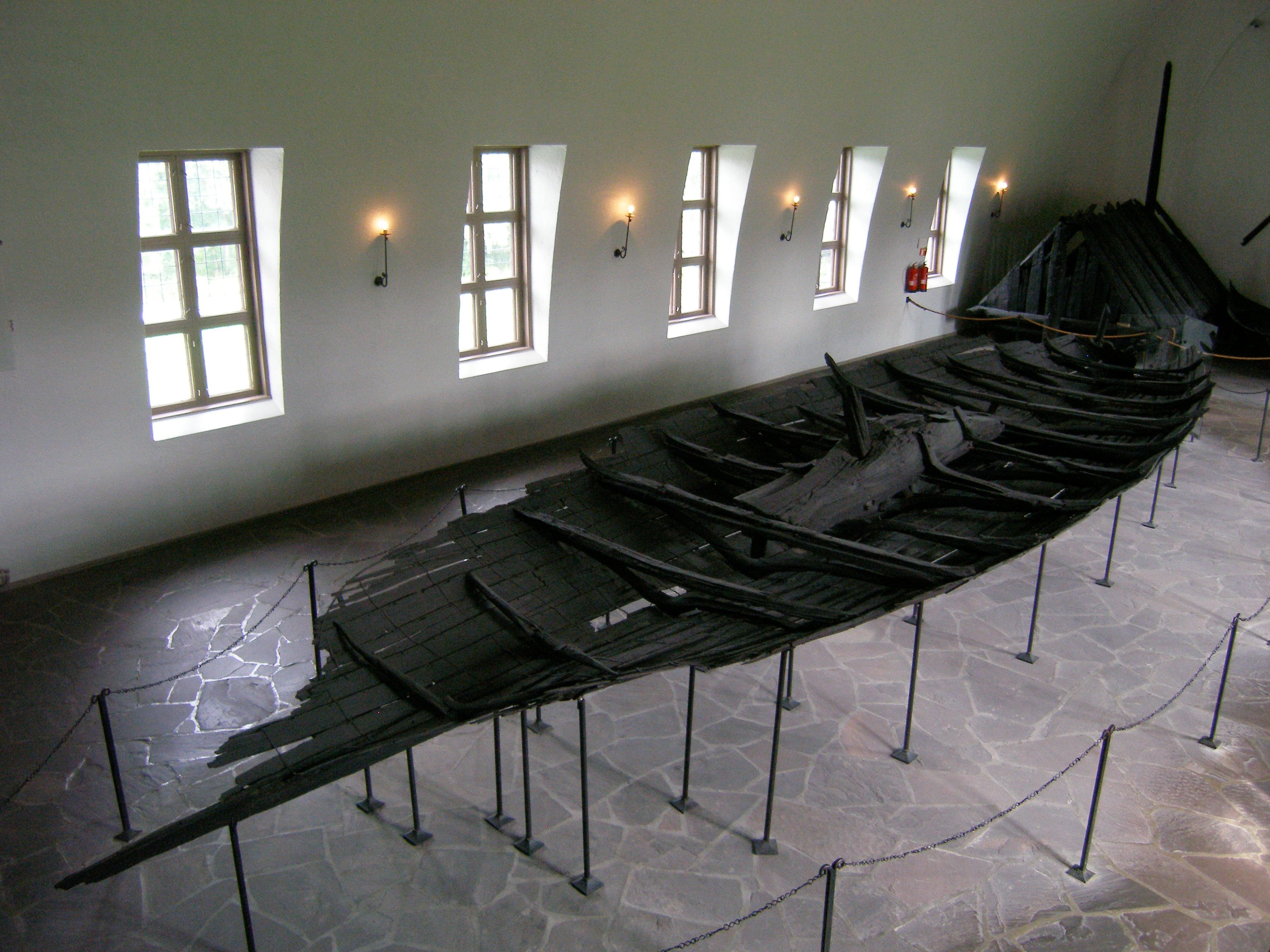
Rygh led excavation of the Tune ship

Rygh was professor of history at the Royal Frederick University (now University of Oslo) between 1866 and 1875. He was director of Oldsaksamlingen (which subsequently became the Museum of Cultural History) from 1862 and professor of Nordic archaeology from 1875 – the first professor of archaeology at any Scandinavian university. He led excavation of the Tune ship 1867. His work about Norwegian antiquities Norske Oldsaker (1885) is recognized for its detailed illustrations and even today is still a significant reference source.

From 1879 to 1899, he chaired the Norwegian Historical Association.

Oluf Rygh is best known for creation of a registry of Norwegian farm names Norske Gaardnavne which is a 19 volume set of books based on a manuscript prepared from 1897 to 1924. The book contains a standardized notation, information on pronunciation, historical forms and the etymology for recorded farm, estate and manor names in Norway, which became the standard for place names in Norway. It inspired similar research in Sweden and Denmark. Rygh died in 1899 at Ulefoss in Holla Municipality in Telemark county. At the time of his death, only three and one half volumes had been published.

== Legacy ==
The street Oluf Ryghs gate at Fagerborg has been named after him.

== Bibliography ==
His more significant publications include:

- 1869 – Om den ældre Jernalder i Norge (On the Older Iron Age in Norway)
- 1877 – Om den yngre Jernalder i Norge (On the Younger Iron Age in Norway)
- 1885 – Norske Oldsaker (Norwegian Antiquities)
- 1897 – Norske Gaardnavne (a 19 volume set on "Norwegian Farm Names" parts of which were completed for publication after his death by other researchers)
