= Andreas Aulie =

Norwegian jurist

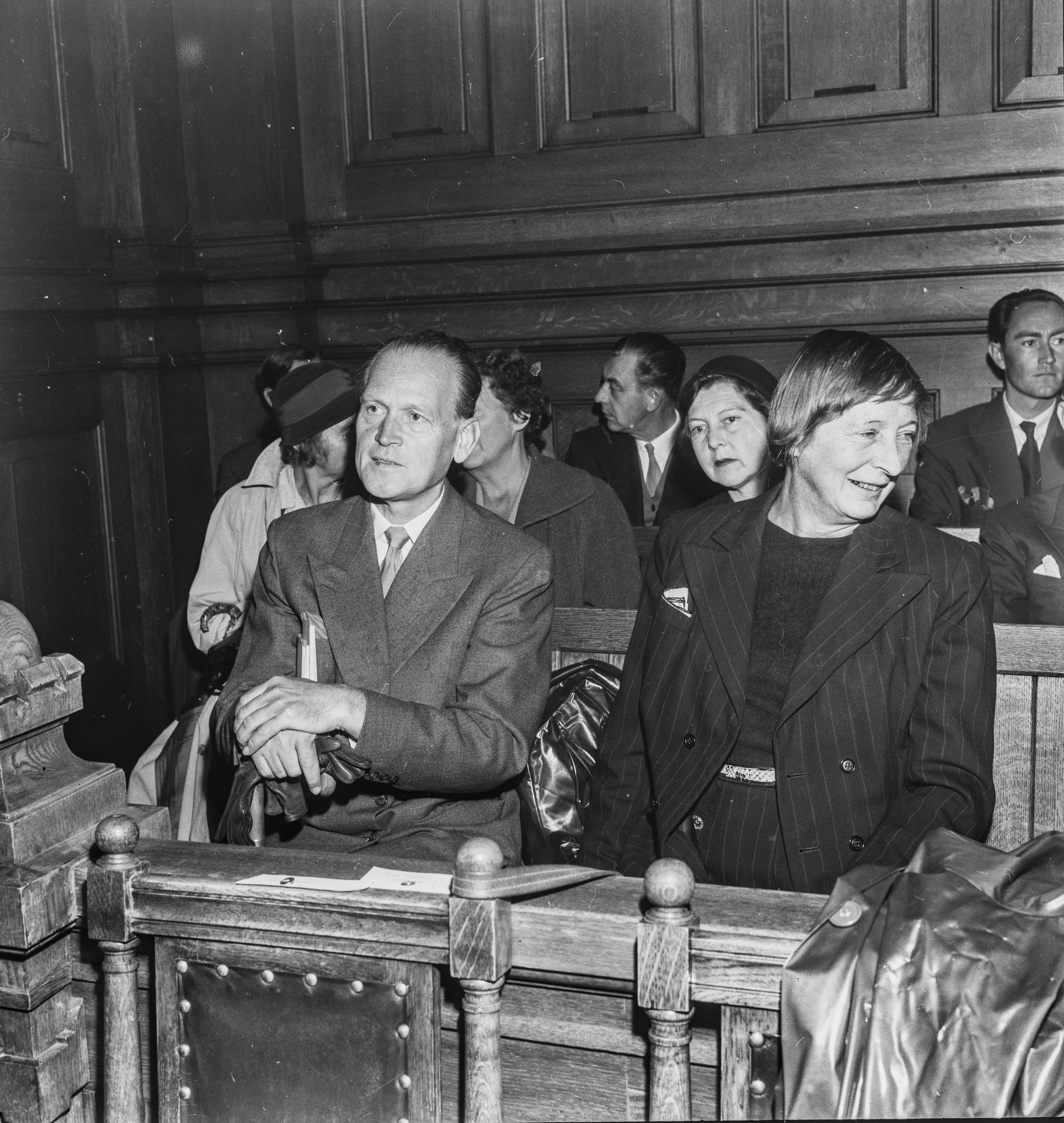
- Aulie during the trials against novelist Agnar Mykle
- Born: 17 November 1897; Kristiania, Norway
- Died: 17 January 1990 (aged 92)
- Occupation: jurist
- Awards: Order of St. Olav; Order of Vasa

Andreas Aulie (17 November 1897 – 17 January 1990) was a Norwegian jurist and civil servant. He was director of public prosecutions from 1946 to 1967.

== Biography ==
Aulie was born in Kristiania (now Oslo), Norway. He was the son of Nils Baltazar Aulie (1867–1951) and Martha Valstad (1872–1966). His brother was artist and instructor, Reidar Aulie (1904–1977). He attended Frogner Gymnasium and graduated from the University of Oslo in 1920. In 1922, he married Ebba Nannestad (1893–1988) and divorced her in 1933. He moved to Bergen when he became a police officer in 1922. From 1930 he was a police chief. He was appointed Public Prosecutor for Bergen and Hordaland in 1939.

During the Occupation of Norway by Nazi Germany, he left the country when he was needed in London to establish Norwegian police force preparedness for liberation after the end of World War II. His wife and children were later brought out of the country. In 1943, Aulie was appointed as the National Police Chief. He re-entered occupied Norway several times to conduct meetings with members of Milorg. He served as chief of police of Norway (Norwegian: rikspolitisjef) from 1945 to 1946. He was Director General of Public Prosecutions from 1946, a position he held for the next twenty-one years.

Aulie was a commander of the star in the Order of St. Olav. He was also made a commander of the Order of Vasa and was made an honorary member of the Order of the British Empire.

Legal offices
Preceded by Sven Arntzen	Norwegian Director of Public Prosecutions; 1946–1967	Succeeded by Lauritz Jenssen Dorenfeldt
