= Ranheim Church =

Church in Trøndelag, Norway

- Ranheim kirke
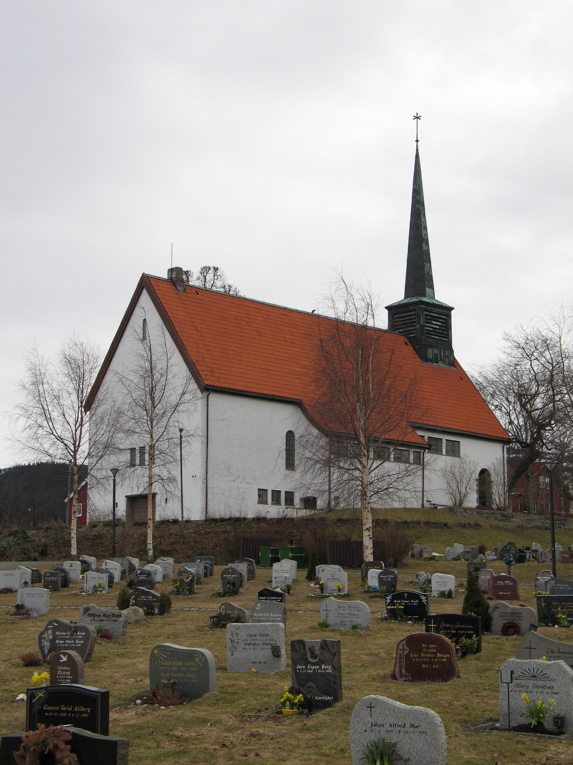
- View of the church
- Ranheim Church
- 63.42985185°N 10.53567007°E
- Location: Trondheim Municipality, Trøndelag
- Country: Norway
- Denomination: Church of Norway
- Churchmanship: Evangelical Lutheran

History
- Status: Parish church
- Founded: 1898
- Consecrated: 20 April 1933
- Events: 25–26 Jan 1932: Church fire

Architecture
- Functional status: Active
- Architect: Roar Tønseth
- Architectural type: Cruciform
- Completed: 1933 (93 years ago)

Specifications
- Capacity: 200
- Materials: Stone

Administration
- Diocese: Nidaros bispedømme
- Deanery: Strinda prosti
- Parish: Ranheim og Charlottenlund
- Norwegian Cultural Heritage Site
- Type: Church
- Status: Listed
- ID: 85274

Ranheim Church (Norwegian: Ranheim kirke) is a parish church of the Church of Norway in Trondheim Municipality in Trøndelag county, Norway. It is located in Ranheim, a neighbourhood in the east of Trondheim. It is one of the churches for the Ranheim og Charlottenlund parish which is part of the Strinda prosti (deanery) in the Diocese of Nidaros. The white, stone church was built in a cruciform style using plans drawn up by the architect Roar Tønseth (1895-1985). The church seats about 200 people.

== History ==
The first chapel in Ranheim was a wooden long church built in 1898 using designs by the architect Karl Norum. The chapel was consecrated on 20 April 1898 and it seated about 350 people. The church was struck by lightning shortly before midnight on 25 January 1932 and the church caught fire and burned to the ground in about an hour. Some of the altar equipment, the priestly garments, and some of the furniture from the sacristy were able to be saved. A new church was built in 1933 that was consecrated on 20 April 1933 by the Bishop Johan Nicolai Støren. The new church sits about 100 metres (330 ft) northeast of the site of the old church. The new church is a cruciform design with very short transepts. The church was renovated in 2013.

== Media gallery ==
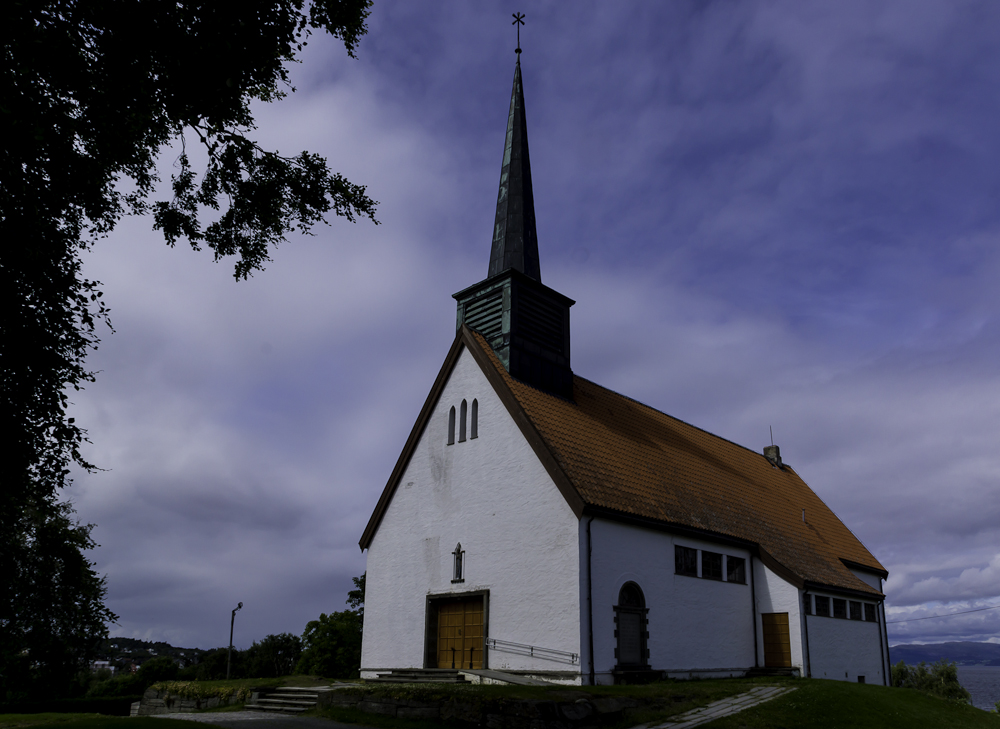

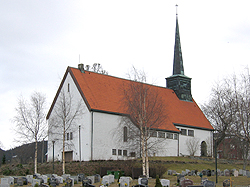

== See also ==
- List of churches in Nidaros
