= Evald Rygh =

Norwegian banker and politician (1842–1913)

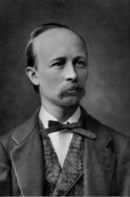

Minister of Finance and Customs
- In office 13 July 1889 – 5 March 1891

Member of Parliament
- In office 1892–1894

Personal details
- Born: 26 May 1842 Verdal Municipality
- Died: 9 May 1913 (aged 70)
- Party: Conservative
- Relations: Karl Ditlev Rygh (brother); Oluf Rygh (brother)
- Occupation: Banker
- Profession: Jurist

Evald Rygh (26 May 1842 – 9 May 1913) was a Norwegian banker and politician for the Conservative Party. He served as Minister of Finance and Customs and mayor of Kristiania.

He was born in Verdal Municipality, and was the brother of Karl Ditlev and Oluf Rygh. He was educated in law, holding a cand.jur. degree. Both his brothers were noted archaeologists, and Karl Ditlev was a conservative politician too.

From 1880 to 1889 Evald Rygh served as burgomaster of Kristiania. On 13 July 1889, when the first cabinet Stang assumed office, Rygh was appointed Minister of Finance and Customs. He lost this post when the first cabinet Stang fell on 5 March 1891. Instead, he was elected to the Norwegian Parliament in 1892 for the constituency of Kristiania, Hønefoss og Kongsvinger. He only served one term, having also served as mayor of Kristiania from 1893 to 1894. Rygh reportedly turned down a request to return as a government minister when the second cabinet Stang was formed in 1893. In 1895 and 1896 he led the committee that negotiated a new Mellomrikslov between Norway and Sweden, as Sweden had annulled the existing laws in 1895. The negotiations were fruitless, as such contributing to the dissolution of the union between Norway and Sweden in 1905.

Outside politics Rygh was the CEO of Christiania Sparebank from 1893. He was also the first chair of the National Theatre. Together with Hans Hagerup Krag he worked to establish an outdoors area around Holmenkollen, Voksenkollen and Frognerseteren accessible to the city populace. Through the Holmen-Voksenkoll Society, founded in 1888, they helped in the building of Holmenkollen Chapel and, together with the Association for the Promotion of Skiing, the establishment of the Holmenkollen ski jump and Korketrekkeren, a luge and bobsleigh course. To commemorate this a bauta of Rygh was erected at Holmenkollen. The road Ryghs vei and the square Evald Ryghs plass, both in Oslo, have been named after him. Rygh was also proclaimed a Commander, First Class of the Royal Norwegian Order of St. Olav in 1891.

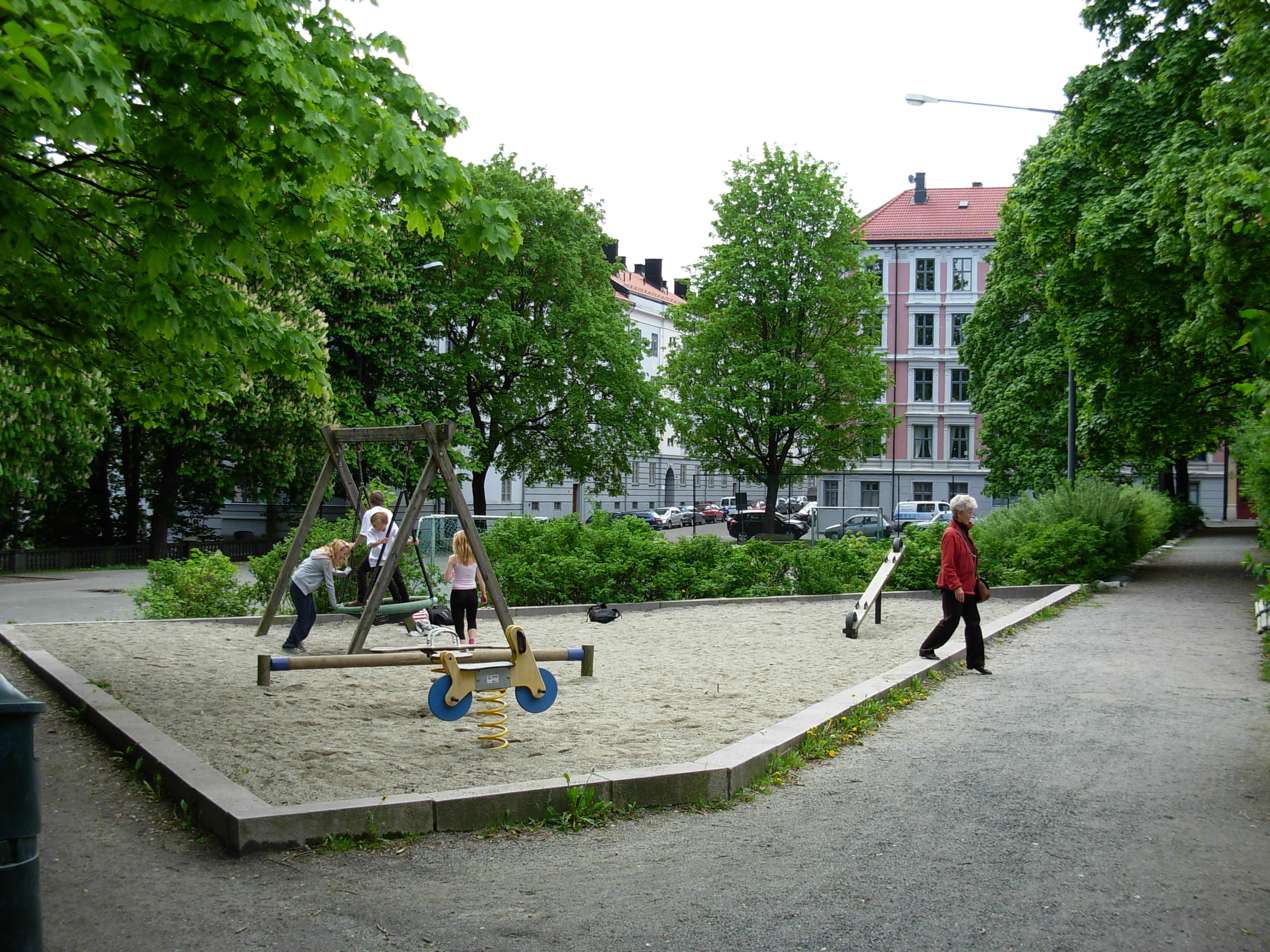
Evald Ryghs plass, square in Oslo.

Rygh died in 1913. He was buried at Cemetery of Our Saviour.

Political offices
Preceded by Olaj Olsen	Norwegian Minister of Finance and Customs; 1889–1891	Succeeded by Johannes Steen
Preceded by August C. B. Bonnevie	Mayor of Oslo; 1893–1894	Succeeded by Fredrik Stang Lund
