= Reidar Aulie =

Norwegian artist

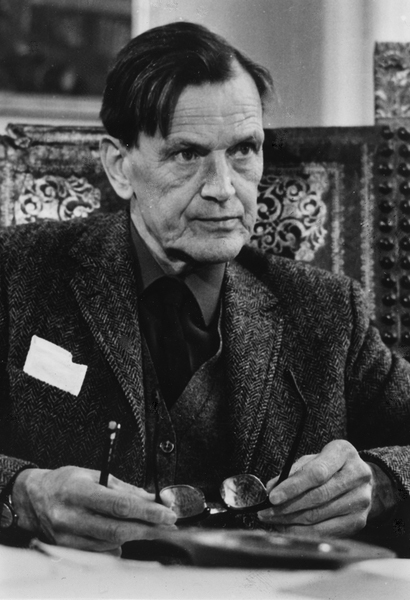
Reidar Aulie, 1970

Reidar Aulie (13 March 1904 – 23 November 1977) was a Norwegian artist.

== Biography ==
Reidar Aulie was born in Kristiania (now Oslo), the son of Nils Baltazar Aulie (1867–1951) and Martha Valstad (1872–1966). He grew up in a middle-class home in Oslo. Reider Aulie was the younger brother of Andreas Aulie (1897–1990), a lawyer who was the Norwegian attorney general (Norges riksadvokat) from 1946 until 1967. Aulie graduated in 1927 and traveled to Paris in the autumn with fellow student, Bjarne Ness, who died of tuberculosis just before Christmas that year, only 25 years old. His death made a strong impression on the younger Aulie who had shared lodgings with Ness. Aulie debuted at the Autumn Exhibition (Høstutstillingen) in 1927. Aulie already had in the 1930s, illustrated books by such authors as Ingeborg Refling Hagen and Martin Andersen Nexø.

As a young progressive and intellectual artist, Aulie sided with the labor movement within the national political struggle. Aulie paintings are full of symbolism and there is often room for several interpretations. Aulie was always concerned with the common man and portrayed him with great enthusiasm. In the 1930s he became an artist for the Socialist movement. In 1932 he participated in the Anti-War Conference in Amsterdam the same year and was chairman of the Anti-War Committee in Oslo and the surrounding area. In 1936 Aulie built a house and studio on Maridalsveien Street in Oslo, where he lived the rest of his life

He became best known for the art produced during the Second World War. Aulie had a significant production in the years 1940-45, during periods spent hiding on a small farm owned by his in-laws in Eidsberg. Aulie's main production year was 1943 when he painted the important war pictures of subjects that would not be tolerated by German censorship. His notable work, entitled 9. april 1940, tells of the invasion which resulted in the occupation of Norway by Nazi Germany. In the winter of 1945, he was sent to Grini concentration camp.

In 1950 he painted Arbeiderbevegelsens historie, a fresco of the labor movement's history, in Oslo City Hall. His last two decades were marked by the teaching duties, first as professor from 1958 and later as rector from 1965 at the Norwegian National Academy of Fine Arts. In 1964, he received the Swedish Prince Eugen Medal by the King of Sweden for outstanding artistic work.

== Personal life ==
In 1933 Reidar Aulie married Kari (Gunvor Katarina) Randem (1908–1994).

== Notable work ==
- Tendens, 1931
- Jungelen, 1933
- Henrettelsesmorgen, 1933
- Kirken, 1935
- Et folkets hus bygges, 1936
- Frontsoldatenes hjemkomst, 1936
- Grahesten, 1937
- Overgangen, 1939
- Morgen, 1940
- 9. april 1940, 1943
- Gustav, 1943

== Other sources ==
- Høisæther, Ole Rikard (1998) Reidar Aulie: Kunst og kamp (Oslo: Gyldendal) ISBN 978-82-05-23473-4
