= Jacob Hersleb Darre =

Norwegian vicar (1757–1841)

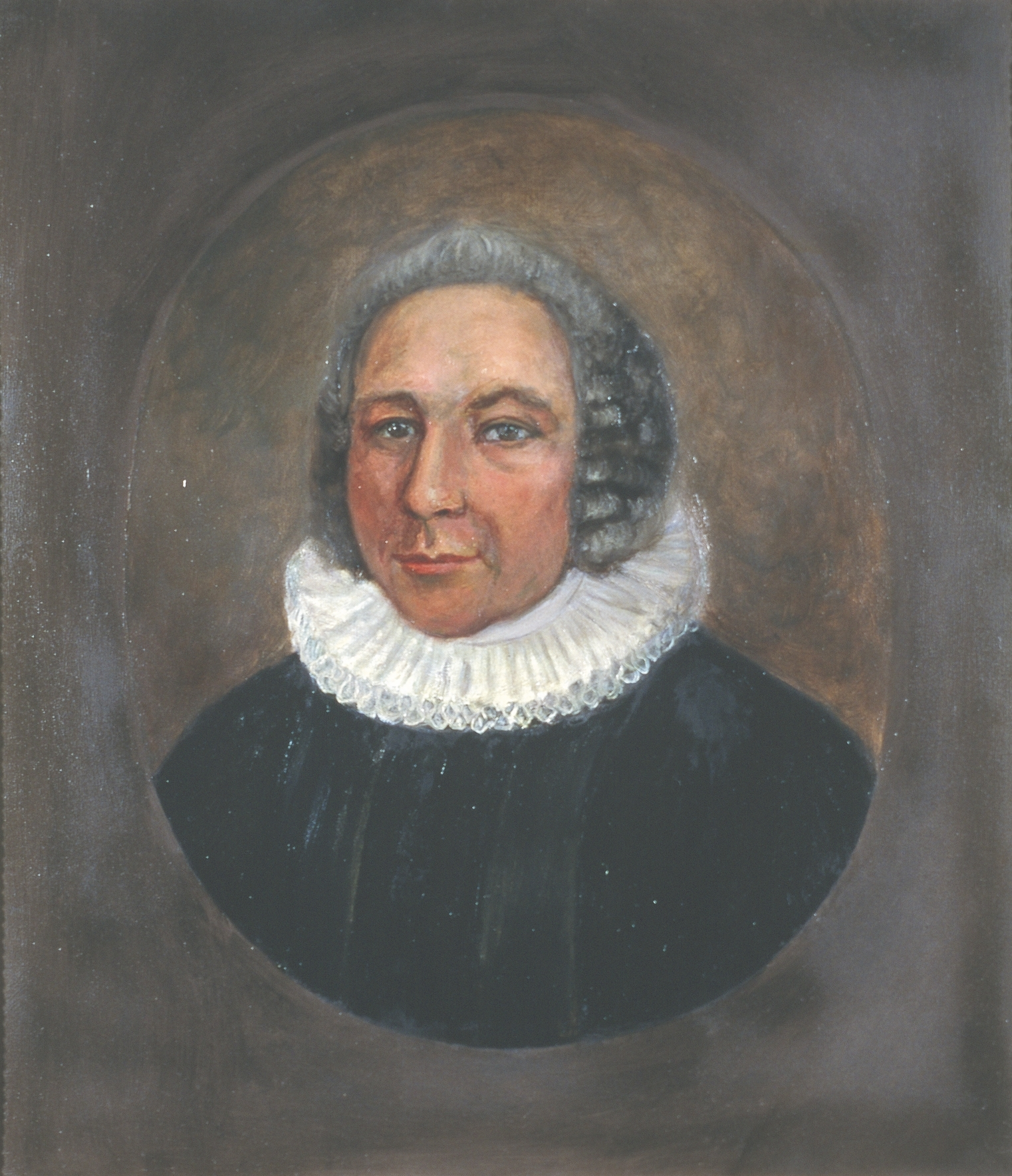
- Born: 20 November 1757; Overhalla, Norway
- Died: 15 December 1841 (aged 84)
- Occupations: Priest and politician
- Known for: Representative at the Norwegian Constitutional Assembly

Jacob Hersleb Darre (20 November 1757 – 15 December 1841) was a Norwegian vicar. He served as a representative at the Norwegian Constitutional Assembly.

Jacob Hersleb Darre was born in the prestegjeld of Overhalla in Nordre Trondheim county, Norway, where his father was parish priest. He was a student at the Trondheim Cathedral School from 1776 and graduated cand. theol. from the University of Copenhagen in 1784. He started his career as a personnel chaplain with his father in Ranem Church. In 1792 he became assistant pastor at Orkdal Church. During the period 1797–1833, he was pastor at Klæbu Church.

He represented Søndre Trondhjems Amt (now Sør-Trøndelag) at the Norwegian Constitutional Assembly at Eidsvoll Manor in 1814. At the Assembly, he was joined by fellow delegates Lars Larsen Forsæth and Hans Christian Ulrik Midelfart. At Eidsvoll, all three delegates supported the independence party (selvstendighetspartiet).

Jacob Darre were married in 1795 with Louise Caroline Steenbuch (1773-1860) who was the daughter of a parish priest. They were the parents of Hans Jørgen Darre, Bishop of Nidaros diocese. The diary of Jacob Darre, which dated from 1814, was published after his death in 1846.

== Related Reading ==
- Holme Jørn (2014) De kom fra alle kanter - Eidsvollsmennene og deres hus (Oslo: Cappelen Damm) ISBN 978-82-02-44564-5
