= Norwegian Fire Protection Association =

Norwegian fire safety foundation

The Norwegian Fire Protection Association (Norwegian: Norsk brannvernforening, FFO) is a Norwegian non-profit foundation, established in 1923. It works "to achieve a safer society" by promoting fire safety. It publishes the periodical Brann & Sikkerhet. Its main office is at Etterstad in Oslo.

It is a member of the European Confederation of Fire Protection Associations.
