= Strinda Municipality =

Former municipality in Trøndelag, Norway

Strinda Municipality Strinda herred
- Former municipality
- Strinden herred (historic name)
- Sør-Trøndelag within Norway

- Strinda within Sør-Trøndelag
- Coordinates: 63°24′43″N 10°25′55″E
- Country: Norway
- County: Sør-Trøndelag
- District: Trondheim Region
- Established: 1 Jan 1838
  - Created as: Formannskapsdistrikt
- Disestablished: 1 Jan 1964
  - Succeeded by: Trondheim Municipality
- Administrative centre: Trondheim

Government
  - Mayor (1957–1963): Johan Dahle (Ap)

Area (upon dissolution)
  - Total: 160.6 km^{2} (62.0 sq mi)
  - Rank: #424 in Norway
- Highest elevation: 506 m (1,660 ft)

Population (1963)
  - Total: 42,531
  - Rank: #6 in Norway
  - Density: 264.8/km^{2} (686/sq mi)
  - Change (10 years): ▲ +49.4%
- Demonym(s): Strinding; Strindaværing

Official language
  - Norwegian form: Bokmål
- Time zone: UTC+01:00 (CET)
  - Summer (DST): UTC+02:00 (CEST)
- ISO 3166 code: NO-1660

Strinda is a former municipality in the old Sør-Trøndelag county, Norway. The 160.6-square-kilometre (62.0 sq mi) municipality existed from 1838 until its dissolution in 1964. The municipality encompassed the eastern part of what is now Trondheim Municipality south and east of the main city center all the way southeast to the lake Jonsvatnet. Strinda Municipality originally included what is now Malvik Municipality as well. The western part of the municipality was heavily urbanized, while the areas further east and south were more suburban. The administrative centre was actually located in the neighboring city of Trondheim, just across the Nidelva river on the Kjøpmansgata road.

Prior to its dissolution in 1963, the 160.6-square-kilometre (62.0 sq mi) municipality was the 424th largest by area out of the 689 municipalities in Norway. Strinda Municipality was the 6th most populous municipality in Norway with a population of about 42,531. The municipality's population density was 264.8 inhabitants per square kilometre (686/sq mi) and its population had increased by 49.4% over the previous 10-year period.

== General information ==
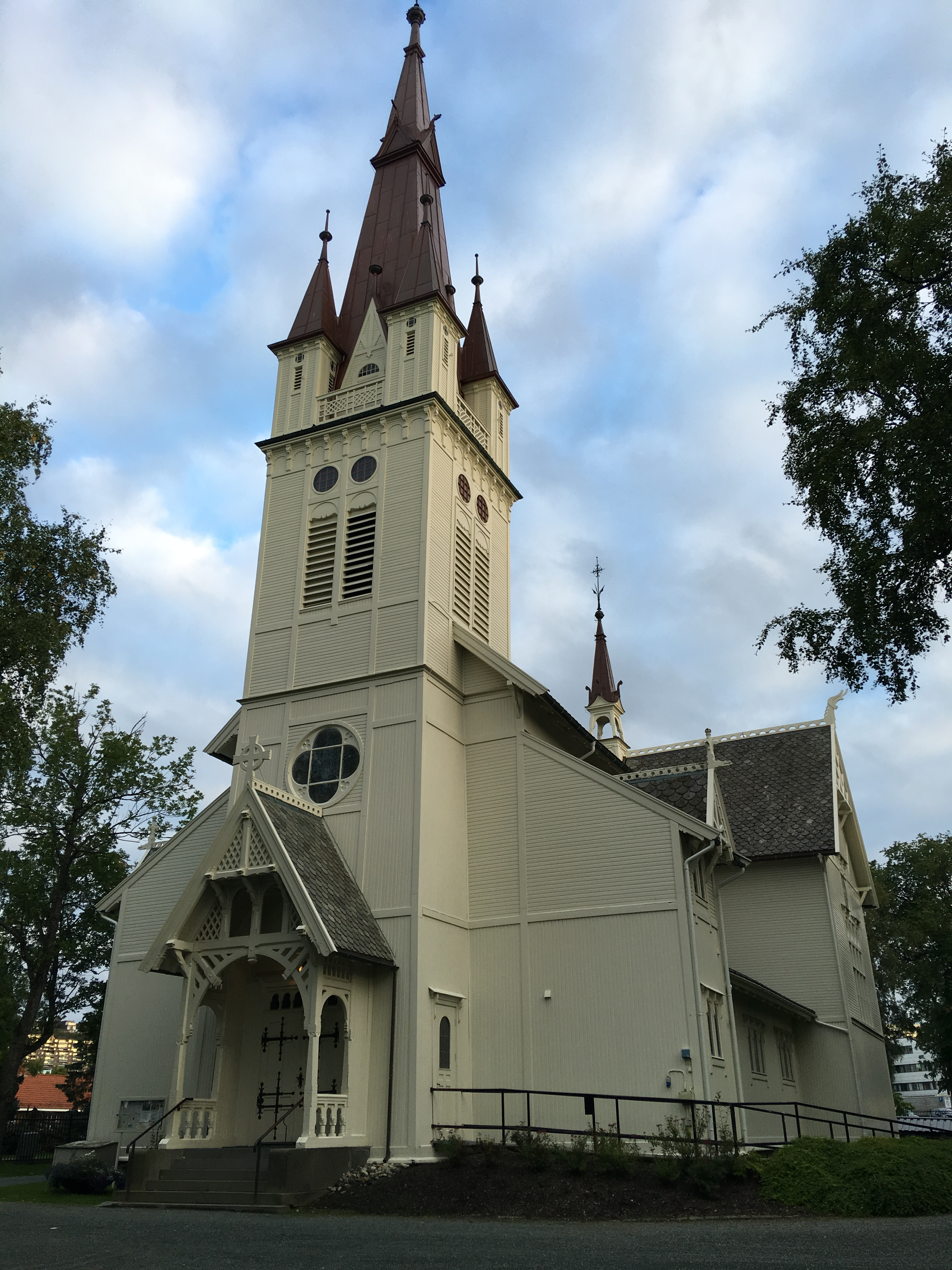
View of Strinda Church

The municipality of Strinda was established on 1 January 1838 (see formannskapsdistrikt law). According to the 1835 census, Strinda had a population of 4,593. In 1891, the eastern part of Strinda Municipality (population: 2,487) was separated from Strinda to form the new Malvik Municipality, leaving Strinda Municipality with a population of 2,769.

Starting in 1864, a series of border adjustments moved territory from Strinda Municipality to the neighboring [[city of [rondheim]]. On 1 January 1864, an area with 1,229 residents was transferred; then on 1 January 1893, an area with 4,097 residents was transferred; and finally on 1 January 1952, the Lade area with 2,230 inhabitants was transferred to Trondheim.

During the 1960s, there were many municipal mergers across Norway due to the work of the Schei Committee. On 1 January 1964, Byneset Municipality (population: 2,049), Leinstrand Municipality (population: 4,193), Strinda Municipality (population: 44,600), Tiller Municipality (population: 3,595), and the city of Trondheim (population: 56,982) were merged to form the new urban Trondheim Municipality which would have a total population of 111,419.

=== Name ===
The municipality (originally the parish) is named Strinda. The name likely comes from the Old Norse word strǫnd which means "shore" or "beach", since the main village lies near the shore of the Trondheimsfjorden. Historically, the name of the municipality was spelled Strinden. On 3 November 1917, a royal resolution changed the spelling of the name of the municipality to Strinda.

=== Churches ===
The Church of Norway had three parishes (sokn) within Strinda Municipality. At the time of the municipal dissolution, it was part of the Strinda prestegjeld and the Strinda prosti (deanery) in the Diocese of Nidaros.

Churches in Strinda Municipality
Parish (sokn)	Church name	Location of the church	Year built
Bratsberg	Bratsberg Church	Bratsberg	1850
Byåsen	Strinda Church	Strinda	1900
Lade	Lade Church	Lade	1190
Lade	Ranheim Chapel	Ranheim	1933

== Geography ==
The municipality was located immediately to the south and east of the city of Trondheim. It was bordered by Byneset Municipality and Trondheim Municipality to the west; by the Trondheimsfjorden to the north; Malvik Municipality to the east; and Klæbu Municipality, Tiller Municipality, and Leinstrand Municipality to the south. The highest point in the municipality was the 506-metre (1,660 ft) tall mountain Sjåvidthøgda.

== Government ==
While it existed, Strinda Municipality was responsible for primary education (through 10th grade), outpatient health services, senior citizen services, welfare and other social services, zoning, economic development, and municipal roads and utilities. The municipality was governed by a municipal council of directly elected representatives. The mayor was indirectly elected by a vote of the municipal council. The municipality was under the jurisdiction of the Frostating Court of Appeal.

=== Municipal council ===
The municipal council (Herredsstyre) of Strinda Municipality was made up of 49 representatives that were elected to four year terms. The tables below show the historical composition of the council by political party.

Strinda herredsstyre 1959–1963
Party name (in Norwegian)	Number of representatives
Labour Party (Arbeiderpartiet)	25
Conservative Party (Høyre)	15
Communist Party (Kommunistiske Parti)	2
Christian Democratic Party (Kristelig Folkeparti)	3
Centre Party (Senterpartiet)	2
Liberal Party (Venstre)	2
Total number of members:	49

Strinda herredsstyre 1955–1959
Party name (in Norwegian)	Number of representatives
Labour Party (Arbeiderpartiet)	25
Conservative Party (Høyre)	14
Communist Party (Kommunistiske Parti)	3
Christian Democratic Party (Kristelig Folkeparti)	3
Farmers' Party (Bondepartiet)	2
Liberal Party (Venstre)	2
Total number of members:	49

Strinda herredsstyre 1951–1955
Party name (in Norwegian)	Number of representatives
Labour Party (Arbeiderpartiet)	24
Conservative Party (Høyre)	12
Communist Party (Kommunistiske Parti)	3
Christian Democratic Party (Kristelig Folkeparti)	4
Farmers' Party (Bondepartiet)	2
Liberal Party (Venstre)	3
Total number of members:	48

Strinda herredsstyre 1947–1951
Party name (in Norwegian)	Number of representatives
Labour Party (Arbeiderpartiet)	23
Conservative Party (Høyre)	9
Communist Party (Kommunistiske Parti)	5
Christian Democratic Party (Kristelig Folkeparti)	3
Farmers' Party (Bondepartiet)	2
Liberal Party (Venstre)	3
Joint List(s) of Non-Socialist Parties (Borgerlige Felleslister)	3
Total number of members:	48

Strinda herredsstyre 1945–1947
Party name (in Norwegian)	Number of representatives
Labour Party (Arbeiderpartiet)	22
Conservative Party (Høyre)	9
Communist Party (Kommunistiske Parti)	6
Christian Democratic Party (Kristelig Folkeparti)	4
Farmers' Party (Bondepartiet)	1
Liberal Party (Venstre)	3
Joint List(s) of Non-Socialist Parties (Borgerlige Felleslister)	3
Total number of members:	48

Strinda herredsstyre 1937–1941*
Party name (in Norwegian)	Number of representatives
Labour Party (Arbeiderpartiet)	17
Communist Party (Kommunistiske Parti)	1
Liberal Party (Venstre)	2
Joint List(s) of Non-Socialist Parties (Borgerlige Felleslister)	15
Local List(s) (Lokale lister)	1
Total number of members:	36
Note: Due to the German occupation of Norway during World War II, no elections were held for new municipal councils until after the war ended in 1945.

=== Mayors ===
The mayor (Norwegian: ordfører) of Strinda Municipality was the political leader of the municipality and the chairperson of the municipal council. The following people have held this position:

- 1838–1839: Henrik August Angell
- 1839–1843: Ole Soelberg
- 1844–1845: Lauritz Dorenfeldt Jenssen
- 1846–1849: Ole Soelberg
- 1850–1853: Lauritz Dorenfeldt Jenssen
- 1854–1855: Johan Richard Krogness
- 1856–1861: Ole Soelberg
- 1862–1865: Bernhard Ludvig Essendrop
- 1866–1867: Anton Getz
- 1868–1873: Bernhard Ludvig Essendrop
- 1874–1877: Nils Holtermann
- 1878–1881: Morten Lyng Lossius
- 1882–1888: Carl Adolph Brodtkorb
- 1888–1889: Lauritz Jenssen (H)
- 1890–1895: Hans Wingaard Finne (H)
- 1896–1897: Anton Sophus Bachke (H)
- 1898–1898: Anton Julius Sand
- 1899–1907: Paul Fjermstad (V)
- 1908–1913: Hans Wingaard Finne (H)
- 1914–1916: Bonsach Lund (H)
- 1916–1916: Hans Wingaard Finne (H)
- 1917–1919: Trond Moshus (H)
- 1920–1922: Harald Tessem (H)
- 1923–1925: Trond Moshus (H)
- 1926–1931: Jonas Kaarbø (H)
- 1932–1934: L.B. Sivertsen (H)
- 1935–1937: Anton A. Furuseth (H)
- 1938–1940: Per Almaas (Ap)
- 1941–1941: Anton A. Furuseth (H)
- 1941–1945: C.B. Alfsen (NS)
- 1945–1945: Johan Karlsen (Ap)
- 1945–1955: Per Almaas (Ap)
- 1956–1956: Sverre Svendsen (Ap)
- 1957–1963: Johan Dahle (Ap)

== See also ==
- List of former municipalities of Norway
