= Margot Dorenfeldt =

Norwegian chemist (1895–1986)

- Born: 2 October 1895; Worms, Germany
- Died: March 9, 1986 (aged 90); Oslo, Norway
- Education: Norwegian Institute of Technology
- Occupation: Chemical engineer
- Known for: First woman to graduate from Norwegian Institute of Technology
- Spouse: Eugen Holtan
- Children: 2
- Father: Lauritz J. Dorenfeldt (1863–1932)

Margot Dorenfeldt (2 October 1895 – 9 March 1986) was the first woman to graduate from Norwegian Institute of Technology (1919) and specialized in inorganic chemistry and electrochemistry. She published several papers in radiochemistry.

== Early life and education ==
Margot Dorentfeld was born on 2 October 1895 in Worms, Germany, to Aagot Bødtker (1869–1963) and Lauritz J. Dorenfeldt (1863–1932). Her father was a Norwegian engineer who had been educated in Berlin and the family was in Worms at the time of her birth as her father was working on assignment as technical director of a cellulose factory. Her paternal grandfather was businessman Lauritz Dorenfeldt Jenssen (1837–1899).

Margot Dorenfeldt was the second woman to enroll at the Norwegian Institute of Technology (NTH) after Aslaug Urbye (who enrolled in 1910, but never completed her studies). In 1919, Dorenfeldt became the first woman to graduate from NTH. While in college, she was active in student debates and made critical comments about her fellow engineers and their record of participation in social politics.

== Career ==
Dorenfeldt found her first job in 1920 as an assistant at the chemistry laboratory at Royal Frederick University (now University of Oslo). A few months later, she was promoted to a secretary-like position, from which she could perform research and teach. Soon she was investigating the atomic weight of chlorine while working with the radiochemist and associate professor Ellen Gleditsch, who had previously worked with Marie Curie in Paris. Dorenfeldt helped publish their results in English, German and French.

In 1922, the university granted Dorenfeldt a scholarship so she could study at the Collège de France in Paris. While there she met and married a fellow Norwegian and changed her name to Margot Dorenfeldt Holtan. She published research using her married name as well as her maiden name.

As a wife and mother of two, Margot attended to her family but continued working in the field as a part-time secretary and chemist and, according to her own records, she also published scientific work with her husband. Throughout her life, she remained close to her father and his business interests and she took a government position in 1946 and then became an association board member from which she could help protect the interests of his pulp and paper businesses.

== Personal life ==
She was married on 23 February 1923 in Paris to Norwegian engineer Eugen Nannestad Holtan (1893–1959).
