= Ambrotius Olsen Lindvig =

Norwegian Minister of Trade

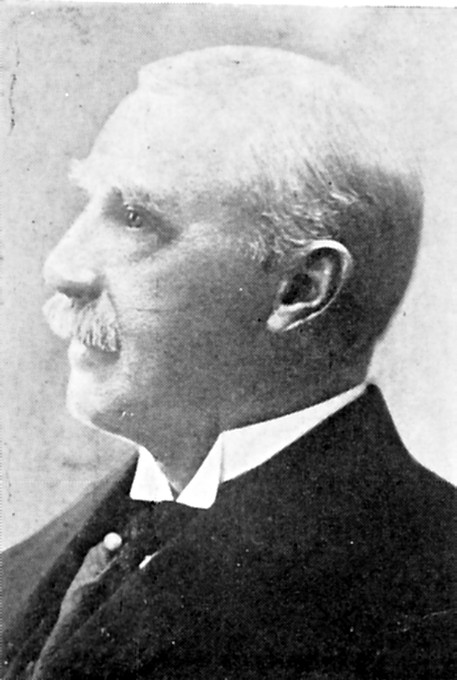
Ambrotius Olsen Lindvig

Ambrotius Olsen Lindvig (30 September 1855 – 9 May 1946) was the Norwegian Minister of Trade 1912–1913.
