= Wollert Konow (prime minister) =

Norwegian politician

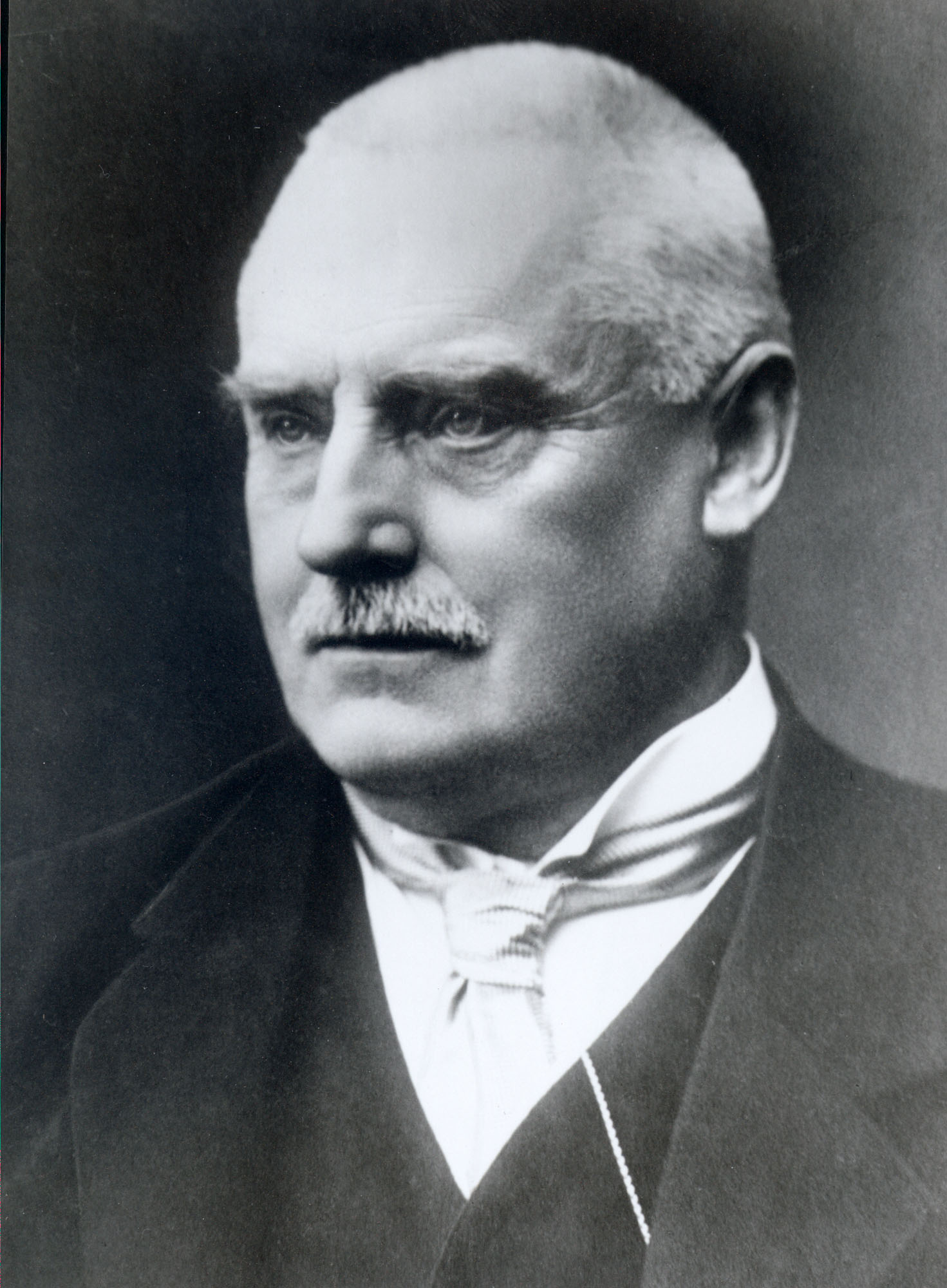
- Wollert Konow, circa 1910

Prime Minister of Norway
- In office 2 February 1910 – 20 February 1912
- Monarch: Haakon VII
- Preceded by: Gunnar Knudsen
- Succeeded by: Jens Bratlie

Minister of Auditing
- In office 2 February 1910 – 20 February 1912
- Prime Minister: Himself
- Preceded by: Gunnar Knudsen
- Succeeded by: Jens Bratlie

Minister of Agriculture
- In office 2 February 1910 – 1 March 1910
- Prime Minister: Himself
- Preceded by: Hans K. Foosnæs
- Succeeded by: Bernt Holtsmark

President of the Storting
- In office 1 January 1910 – 2 February 1910 Serving with Magnus Halvorsen and Jens Bratlie
- Prime Minister: Gunnar Knudsen
- Preceded by: Carl Berner; Gunnar Knudsen; Edvard Liljedahl
- Succeeded by: Søren Tobias Årstad; Jørgen Løvland; Gunnar Knudsen
- In office 1 January 1886 – 31 December 1888 Serving with Sivert A. Nielsen; Johannes Steen
- Prime Minister: Johan Sverdrup
- Preceded by: Johan Sverdrup; Johannes Steen
- Succeeded by: Emil Stang; Sivert A. Nielsen; Olaus Olsen Eskeland; Thomas C. Bang

Personal details
- Born: 16 August 1845 Fana, Hordaland, United Kingdoms of Sweden and Norway
- Died: 15 March 1924 (aged 78) Fana, Hordaland, Norway
- Party: Free-minded Liberal; Liberal
- Spouse: Fredrikke Wilhelmine Kooter (m. 1875)

Wollert Konow (16 August 1845 – 15 March 1924) was the prime minister of Norway from 1910 to 1912. He was the leader of a coalition cabinet. Konow's time as prime minister saw the extension of accident insurance to seamen in 1911.

== Background ==
Konow was born in Fana Municipality (now part of Bergen Municipality) in Norway. He was the son of Wollert Konow (1809–1881) and Marie Louise Oehlenschläger (1818–1910). His father was a writer and elected official. In 1842 his parents had purchased the historic Stend Manor in Fana where Wollert Konow was born. Wollert Konow was a grandson of the noted Danish poet and playwright Adam Oehlenschlager (1779–1850).

He was a student at Bergen Cathedral School. After graduating in 1864, Konow went to the Royal Frederick University in Christiania. He began to study law which he never completed. In 1868, he started a school at Halsnøya in Sunnhordland where he was both teacher and head manager until 1872. In 1873 Konow took over operation of the mill at Stend and expanded the estate by acquiring neighboring properties.

== Career ==
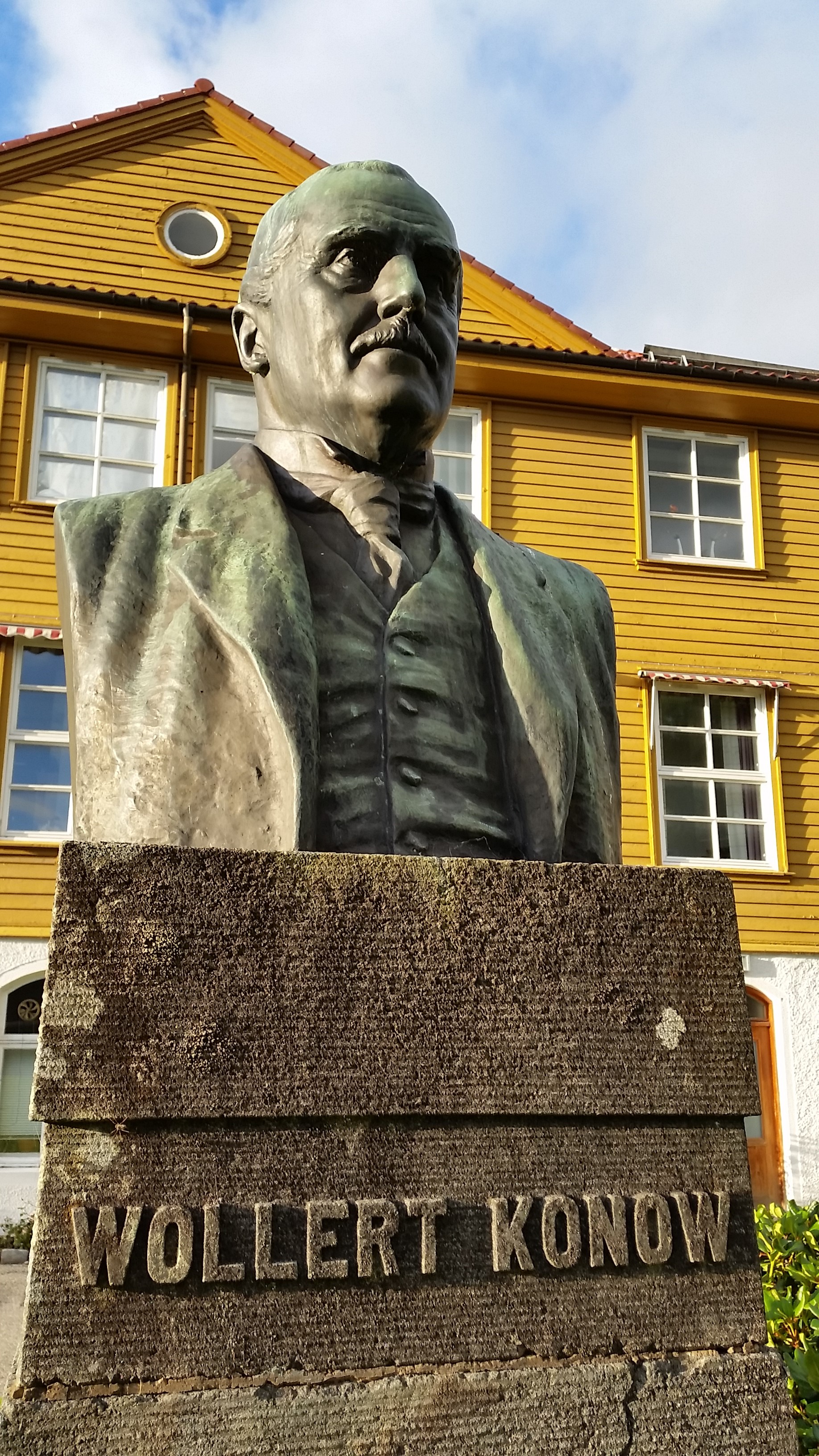
Bust by Ambrosia Tønnesen at the old Fana Municipal Hall

Wollert Konow was mayor of Fana most of the time between 1880 and 1901, and was in 1877–1879 Deputy to the Parliament for Søndre Bergenhus amt (now Hordaland). He served as Minister of Agriculture in 1910 and Minister of Auditing 1910-1912. He was Odelsting president 1884–1887 and President of the Storting in 1888 and again from 1897 to 1899. He was a central board member of the Liberal Left Party from 1909 to 1912. Wollert Konow served as Prime Minister over a two-year period as leader of a coalition which combined elements of two competing parties; Høgre and Frisindede Venstre. Konow's coalition government came to an end in 1912 after he declared his sympathies for the rural language form Landsmål during the height of the Norwegian language conflict causing conflict with Riksmål supporters. After loss in the election in 1912, Konow was out of politics for good, and he spent the remainder of his life at Stend.

He was commonly referred to as Wollert Konow (SB) to differentiate him from Wollert Konow (H) who was his cousin and contemporary politician from Hedemark. The initials "SB" stood for "Søndre Bergenhus," the now-defunct constituency Konow represented in national politics.

== Personal life ==
In 1875, he married Fredrikke Wilhelmine Kooter (1854-1935), who was the daughter of Jacob Blaauw Kooter (1818-1887) and Marie Frederikke Balchen (1817-1883). Konow was alternate member of the Norwegian Nobel Committee, 1913 to 1922 and Member of the Committee from 1922 until he died at Stend in Fana during 1924.

== Stend Manor ==
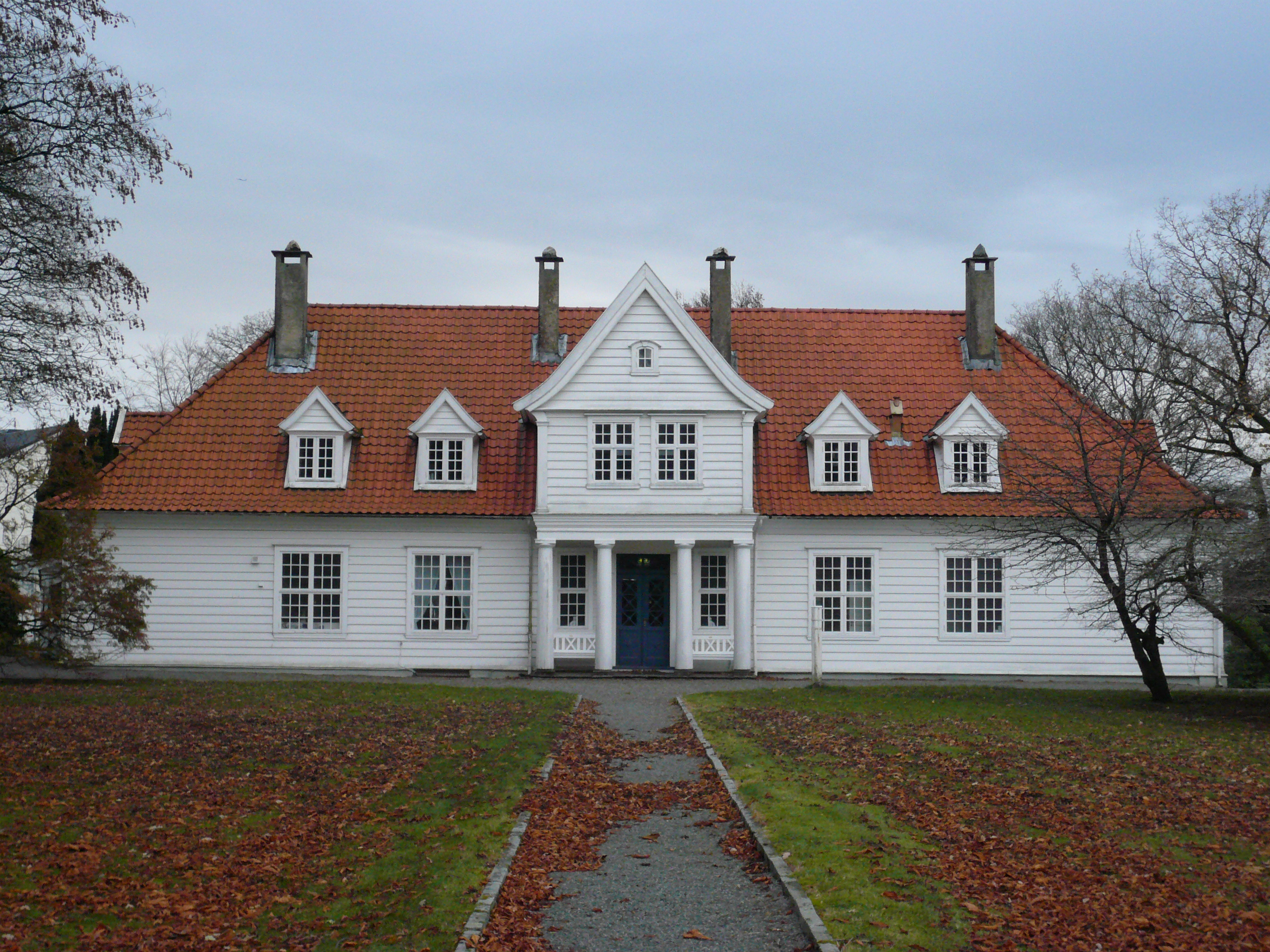
Stend Manor

Stend Manor (Stend hovedgård) was a historic estate which had belonged to Nonneseter Abbey of Bergen during the Middle Ages. Around 1682, the main building was built in timber as a single-story with three wings. In 1842, Dr. Wollert Konow acquired Stend Manor.

In 1861, Stend Manor was bought by Søndre Bergenhus (now Hordaland) county. Since then, it has housed an agricultural school. Under the direction of architect Erlend Tryti (1885-1962) extensive renovation and restoration work was carried out in the years 1921-1922. The main buildings were restored in the late 1980s and early 1990s.

== See also ==
- Konow's Cabinet

== Other sources ==
- Garvik, Olav (2001) Wollert Konow, Statsminister og stril (Bergen: Fagbokforlaget) ISBN 82-7674-766-3

== Related reading ==
- Borgen, Per Otto (1999) Norges statsministre (Oslo: Aschehou) ISBN 82-03-22389-3
- Forr, Gudleiv; Hegge, Per Egil; Njølstad, Olav (2010) Mellom plikt og lyst. Norske statsministre 1873–2010 (Oslo: Dinamo) ISBN 82-8071-245-3
- Kaartvedt, Alf (1984) Drømmen om borgerlig samling 1884–1918 (Oslo: Cappelen) ISBN 82-02-049903

Political offices
Preceded by Gunnar Knudsen	Prime Minister of Norway; 1910–1912	Succeeded by Jens Bratlie
