= Worm Hirsch Darre-Jenssen =

Norwegian politician and engineer

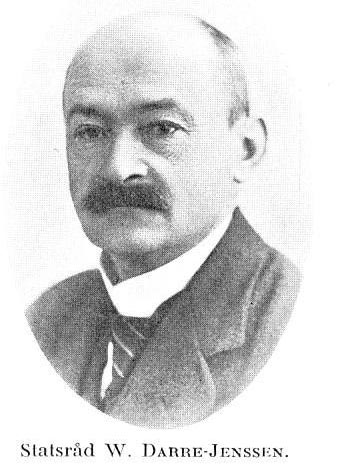

Minister of Labour
- In office 26 July 1926 – 28 January 1928
- Prime Minister: Ivar Lykke
- Preceded by: Anders Venger
- Succeeded by: Magnus Nilssen

Member of the Norwegian Parliament
- In office 1 January 1925 – 31 December 1930
- Constituency: Trondhjem og Levanger

Personal details
- Born: 7 December 1870 Ranheim, Sør-Trøndelag, Sweden-Norway
- Died: 30 April 1945 (aged 74) Trondheim, Sør-Trøndelag, Norway
- Party: Conservative
- Spouse: Augusta Cristensen (m. 1898)
- Relations: Hans Jørgen Darre-Jenssen (brother)
- Children: Gudrun; Lauritz; Ellen
- Profession: Engineer

Worm Hirsch Darre-Jenssen (7 December 1870 – 30 April 1945) was a Norwegian engineer and politician for the Conservative Party. He served two terms in the Parliament of Norway, and as Minister of Labour from 1926 to 1928.

== Career ==
Worm Darre-Jenssen took education in machinery and construction in 1889 and 1890, at the technical school in Trondhjem. From 1890 to 1894 he worked as an assistant in railway construction. From 1894 to 1895 he studied at the Technische Hochschule Hannover. He then worked until 1900 with road administration in Kristians Amt. In 1901 he returned to Trondhjem to supervise the construction of an electricity plant. From 1902 he worked in the city engineer department, from 1913 as chief engineer.

He was elected to the Parliament of Norway in 1925, representing the Market towns of Sør-Trøndelag and Nord-Trøndelag counties. In 1926, following a reshuffle in July, Darre-Jenssen was appointed Minister of Labour. His brother, Hans Jørgen, also served in the same position from 1910-1912. In this position he became known for unwillingness to further develop the rail transport system in Norway, citing that the resources should be channeled into road building. In 1927 he suspended the building of the Namsos Line, which had been approved by the Parliament in 1923. His action was repudiated by a new parliamentary decision in May 1928, allowing the construction to continue. In the meantime, however, the plans had been somewhat reduced. Darre-Jenssen also halted the progress of the Hardanger Line, whose plans, too, had been approved in 1923. Again, the Parliament decided to continue the construction as originally planned. However, Darre-Jenssen went to the county council of Hordaland, which passed a resolution to protest the building of the Hardanger Line and the Flåm Line both located within the county, as well as the Namsos Line, although the latter was built far away from Hordaland. The ensuing stir prompted another parliamentary discussion in 1931, but again the future of the Hardanger Line was confirmed. In January 1928, the cabinet Lykke fell, the Labour Party Hornsrud's Cabinet taking its place. Darre-Jenssen lost his position as Minister of Labour, but did get re-elected for a second and final term in Parliament.

Darre-Jenssen was involved in several organizations. He was a board member of the local chapter of the Norwegian Association of Hunters and Anglers, and chaired the local chapter of the Norwegian Engineer Association (Den norske Ingeniørforening) from 1908 to 1914. From 1912 he was a member of the Engineer Association national board, and from 1923 to 1926 he was its president. He was also a board member of the Norwegian Institute of Technology Foundation from 1915 to 1936, and of the Norwegian Fire Protection Association from 1933. He then served as its vice president from 1937 to 1939.

From 1929 to 1941, Darre-Jenssen was the CEO of Norges Brannkasse. He was removed from the position in 1941, due to the German occupation of Norway. He died on 30 April 1945; Norway was liberated on 8 May.

Political offices
Preceded by Anders Venger	Norwegian Minister of Labour; 1926–1928	Succeeded by Magnus Nilssen
