= Ranheim =

Neighbourhood in the city of Trondheim, Norway

- Neighborhood in Trondheim
- Interactive map of Ranheim
- Coordinates: 63.4286°N 10.5383°E
- Country: Norway
- Region: Central Norway
- County: Trøndelag
- Municipality: Trondheim Municipality
- Borough: Østbyen
- Elevation: 17 m (56 ft)
- Time zone: UTC+01:00 (CET)
  - Summer (DST): UTC+02:00 (CEST)

Ranheim is a neighbourhood in the city of Trondheim in Trøndelag county, Norway. It is located in the borough of Østbyen in Trondheim Municipality. The neighbourhood is approximately 6 kilometres (3.7 mi) to the east of the centre of Trondheim. It comprises Olderdalen, Væretrøa, Reppe, and Vikåsen.

Historically, Ranheim is a working class community due to paper production at the local paper mill, where an overwhelming majority of Ranheim residents worked. Today, however, it is mostly middle class in composition and most residents work elsewhere. Ranheim Church was built 1933.

Ranheim is home to Ranheim Idrettslag sportsclub and Ranheim Fotball. Ranheim was once known for its foul odour, commonly referred to as "Ranheimslukta," (the smell of Ranheim) which was caused by a paper processing byproduct, hydrogen sulfide. In recent years, the paper mill has become a paper recycling plant which has decreased the emission of sulfides. The characteristic smell has consequently disappeared.

== Prehistoric site ==
In 2010, a sizeable pre-historic heathen hof was discovered during an urban development plan. After excavation by archaeologists, the Ranheim cult site has been dated to the 4th century AD in the Nordic Iron Age and was in use up until the 10th century at the end of the Viking Age.
