= Narragansett Runestone =

Inscribed boulder in Rhode Island, United States

Coordinates: 41°34′12.1″N 71°27′8.2″W

- Material: metasandstone
- Height: 5 feet (1.5 m)
- Width: 7 feet (2.1 m)
- Created: Unknown
- Discovered: 1939; Pojac Point, Narragansett Bay, Rhode Island, United States
- Present location: Rhode Island, United States
- Runemaster: Unknown

The Narragansett Runestone, also known as the Quidnessett Rock, is a 2.5 t (2,500 kg; 5,500 lb) slab of metasandstone in Rhode Island, United States. It is 5 feet (1.5 m) in height and 7 feet (2.1 m) long.

The stone is inscribed with two rows of symbols, which some have indicated resemble runes. Runes are characters used by Germanic peoples starting around the 2nd or 3rd century CE, with variants used in Anglo-Saxon and Scandinavian cultures during the medieval period.

The Narragansett Runestone originally sat in Narragansett Bay, visible only during extremely low tides.

In 2012, billionaire Timothy Mellon secretly removed the rock because it drew visitors near his estate; he returned it the following year after state prosecutors agreed to not press charges.

The stone was moved to the University of Rhode Island School of Oceanography for testing, but the tests were not carried out because it would have required damaging the stone.

In January 2014, plans were announced to move the runestone to Goddard Memorial State Park in East Greenwich.

In October 2015, the runestone was placed for long-term public viewing in Wickford, a village of North Kingstown, Rhode Island.

== History ==
In December 1984, a quahogger discovered the Narragansett Runestone while digging in the mud flats of Narragansett Bay. The stone was subsequently reported to the Rhode Island Historical Preservation and Heritage Commission (HPHC).

From the time of its initial discovery in the 1980s into the 1990s, the New England Antiquities Research Association (NEARA) ran several studies and published a number of papers about the stone, including the documentation of how it had been discovered by the quahogger.

The HPHC was unable to find information about the stone in previous inventories of Narragansett Bay. They found that it was located upland as early as 1939, and it might have been buried.

The inscriptions on the stone were visible for only short periods of time between tides, due to dramatic erosion of the shoreline at Pojac Point and the stone's position just 20 feet (6.1 m) from the extreme low tide mark.

In 2012, the state Coastal Resources Management Council reported that the stone had been removed from the tidal waters off Pojac Point between July and August, and a criminal investigation was launched.

The following year, in May 2013, the state Attorney General’s Environmental Unit and DEM’s Criminal Investigation Unit announced that they had recovered the stone after a person came forward with information. Town historian and independent columnist G. Timothy Cranston said that a Pojac Point resident had removed the stone, as he was tired of having tourists scouring the neighborhood and shoreline looking for it. He said that state officials ordered the then-unnamed resident to retrieve the stone after having sunk it in deeper waters off the coast.

In 2014, Everett Brown of Providence reported that he and his brother Warren had carved the runes on Quidnessett Rock in the summer of 1964. He said that he had forgotten about the incident until the stone was removed and recovered in 2013. Brown's account has been disputed by local residents, who state that they saw the stone before 1964, and they have challenged other elements of his statements.

In July 2024, The New York Times reported that Timothy Mellon, an heir to the Mellon banking fortune, whose estate overlooks the rock, was responsible for the removal and subsequent return of the stone, writing: "At a meeting with neighbors, Mr. Mellon angrily insisted [that] the rock was on his property. According to a state report, he confronted people walking along the shore to look at it and told them to leave." The Times further reported that in 2013, the investigation of the stone's disappearance: "...led to Mr. Mellon, who eventually agreed to turn over the stone with no charges filed, according to a non-prosecution agreement obtained by The Times."

== Media ==
The stone is mentioned in episode 11 of season 1 of America Unearthed.

== See also ==
- AVM Runestone
- Heavener Runestone
- Kensington Runestone
