= Oklahoma runestones =

Runestones found in Oklahoma, likely of modern origin

A number of runestones have been found in Oklahoma. All of them are of modern origin dating to the 19th century "Viking revival" or were produced by 19th-century Scandinavian settlers.

The oldest find is the "Heavener Runestone," first documented in 1923. It is a 19th-century artifact made by a Scandinavian immigrant (possibly a Swede working at the local train depot). Two other "Heavener Runestones" are most likely not runic at all but exhibit incisions of Native American origin. Three other runestones, found in Poteau, Shawnee and Pawnee, are of modern date.

== Heavener Runestone ==
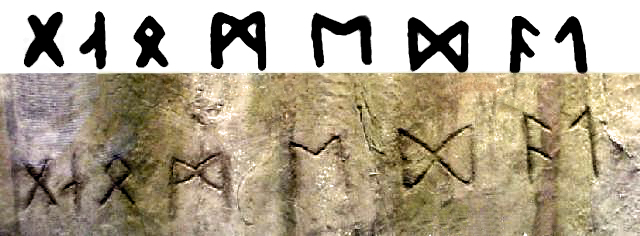
The Heavener runestone

The Heavener Runestone (pronounced /ˈhiːvnər/) is located in Heavener Runestone Park in Le Flore County, Oklahoma, near Heavener, Oklahoma.

The runes on the stone are ᚷᛆᛟᛗᛖᛞᚨᛐ. Most of these characters belong to the Elder Futhark, but the final "L" is reversed compared with the last "A", and the second character is a short-twig "A" from the Younger Futhark. The transcription is then gaomedal, but is generally thought that the intention is that the second character should be an elder futhark "N" (also reversed). The inscription then reads gnomedal (either "gnome valley", or a personal name "G. Nomedal"). Media presented at the Visitor Center translate the ᛆ as an "L," and state that the inscription was probably a claim marker meaning "valley belonging to Glome," or "Glome's Valley."

Archaeologist Ken Feder notes that unlike the situation in eastern Canada where evidence has been found that proves a Norse presence, nothing similar has been found anywhere near Heavener or even in the Midwestern United States. He suggests that "It is unlikely that the Norse would get significantly more fastidious about leaving any evidence behind of their presence in Oklahoma."

Archaeologist Lyle Tompsen, in a 2007 master's thesis for the University of Leicester (published in ESOP 29 2011:5-43), examined the runestone and noted:

1. There is no cultural evidence of Vikings in or near the region.
2. No Old Norse approach to translation fits this stone.
3. The stone's most likely translation is 'Gnome Dale' (Valley of the Gnomes).
4. Scandinavian presence in the nearby town of Heavener is early and the likeliest source of the carving of the stone.
5. Other purported rune stones in the region are modern creations, or misinterpreted Native American rock art.

"Barring any new evidence, the stone is best considered a modern creation."

Henrik Williams, professor in Nordic languages at University of Uppsala, visited Oklahoma in 2015 as part of a tour sponsored by the American Association for Runic Studies in collaboration with Uppsala University and the American Friends of Uppsala University. In a speech to the Poteau Chamber of Commerce he said that the Heavener stone "Is probably in the top 20 I’ve seen in the world, just for the sheer size and impressive nature of it.” He said that it was probably 19th century with a 20% probability of it being 10th or 11th century. “All words have endings, back 1,000 and 500 years ago, and that is one thing we find disturbing,” Williams said of the nonconforming ending on the Heavener Runestone. “None of the American inscriptions ever found have any kind of layout or ornamentation. That’s another thing that doesn’t really fit the pattern.” He also noted that "There are no Vikings or earlier inscriptions on Iceland or Greenland, so it’s a big jump from Sweden to Heavener."

In 1991, Carl Albert State College in nearby Poteau changed its mascot to a Viking in the stone's honor.

== Poteau Stone ==
The Poteau stone was found by schoolboys in 1967 near Poteau in Le Flore County, Oklahoma.

Tompsen also examined this stone, and writes that it is carved into sandstone and is 15 inches long and shows little weathering. The inscription reads ᚷᛆᛟᛁᛖᚨᛚᚦ and Thompsen writes, "This stone consists of a mixture of letters and alphabets from different times." He transcribes these as GLOIEA(?)(?).

Of the eight letters, five are Elder Futhark, one Younger Futhark. The other two he calls "spurious". He writes: "By excluding the last two letters as spurious, five are on the Heavener stone itself. The only one left is a straight line. To the author’s eyes, the Poteau Stone is a copy of the Heavener stone, with the addition of three spurious runic symbols as script-inflation."

Swedish Professor Henrik Williams believes that the inscription is modern, with the stone and toolmarks not as weathered as would be expected if it were from the Viking period.

== Shawnee and Pawnee Stones ==
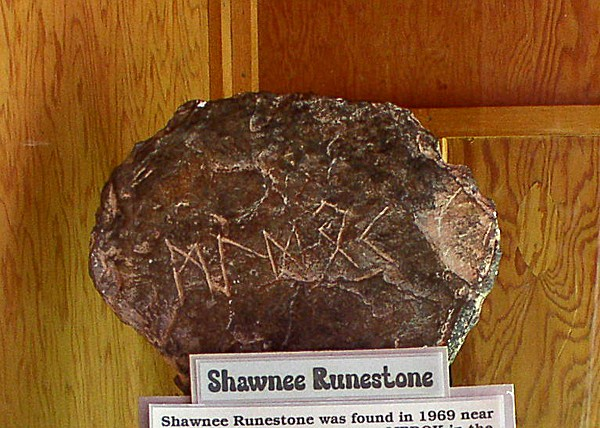
The Shawnee runestone

The Shawnee stone was found in 1969 by three children in Shawnee, Oklahoma, one mile from the North Canadian River, which is a tributary of the Arkansas River.

Professor Don G. Wyckoff, an archaeologist at the University of Oklahoma, examined the Shawnee stone and noted that it is a soft red Permian sandstone, writing that "the inscription is... remarkably fresh and certainly not as worn or weathered as the stone's natural surface. The Survey staff has viewed other exposures of this Permian sandstone which have carved dates as late as 1957 that are more worn and weathered..." Both the Shawnee and Pawnee runestones are products of the modern period. The inscription reads ᛗᛚᛞᛟᚲ, either mldok or midok, in standard Elder Futhark lettering.

== See also ==
- Kensington Runestone
- Vérendrye Runestone
- Spirit Pond runestones
