= AVM Runestone =

1985 hoax in Minnesota, U.S.

Coordinates: 45.81399°N 95.66287°W

The AVM Runestone, also known as the Berg-AVM Runestone, is a hoax created in 1985 by students carving runes into a boulder near Kensington, Minnesota, not far from where the Kensington Runestone was found in 1898. In 2001, a carving expert and her geologist father found the AVM Runestone, told the press that it was proof of early Viking or Norse settlement in Minnesota, and began an investigation to prove its authenticity. The creators said it was a hoax and not an artifact of Viking explorers.

== Discovery and investigation ==
In early 2001, stone carving expert Janey Westin, of Minneapolis, and her father, Robert G. Johnson, an adjunct professor in the geology department of the University of Minnesota, were making a systematic survey of stones in the vicinity of the Kensington Runestone Park, for the research team set up for further understanding of the Kensington Runestone. Investigating a small island in a lake on the farm of Arlen and Ruby Sabolik, about 400 metres (1/4 mile) from the 1898 find site, on May 13, Westin found the carved letters "AVM" on a lichen-covered, pinkish-brown granite gneiss boulder (about 110 cm or 43 inches long, weighing perhaps a tonne) which they had inspected previously in different light conditions. They took photographs and reported their find. Two weeks later, they returned to the site with Minneapolis geologist Scott Wolter and removed lichen to reveal more inscribed characters: the date 1363 in the same pentadic numerals as seen on the Kensington Runestone and a second line of three runes, possibly "ASU", "XSU" or "XSV". Although the symbols of the top line were similar to those on the stone found in 1898, those in the second line were not.

In June, the Runestone Museum in Alexandria established a special committee to investigate the discovery and contacted archaeologists. On June 9, the site was carefully mapped and documented; on July 11, the stone was removed. Three archaeologists from Minnesota institutions conducted a preliminary dig of nine test-holes at and around the site, on July 25, finding no evidence of Norse presence. They found a few Native American artifacts, including two quartz flakes, probably waste from arrowhead production.

The discovery was announced in the Minneapolis Star Tribune on August 11, 2001, with Westin pre-empting accusations by making it very clear that she had not carved the stone. The team suggested that the stone might have been made as a grave marker for some of the Norse explorers. After a public display and press conference at Kensington, the stone was taken to Wolter's St. Paul laboratory for detailed photography and analysis of the weathering of stone and carving. The state archaeologist, Mark Dudzik, was skeptical, maintaining the position that it was "just not logical" to believe that Scandinavian explorers — who, he argued, specialized in exploiting resources along coastlines — had penetrated to Minnesota in the 1360s. Russell Fridley, a former director of the Minnesota Historical Society, expressed a similar view with the observation that "It's a great testimony to Scandinavian humor on the frontier."

Immediately after the announcement, local Norse enthusiast Bob Berg came forward to report that he had found the stone while undertaking a similar survey in late 1994 and reported on it in April 1995 to the Viking research group of which he was a member. Their firm conclusion had been that it was a hoax, not worth further effort.

== Confession and explanation ==
On September 5, 2001, Kari Ellen Gade, then chair of the Department of Germanic Studies at Indiana University, and Jana K. Schulman, associate professor in English at Southeastern Louisiana University, wrote a letter to the Minnesota Historical Society. They explained that in June 1985, while students at the University of Minnesota, they and three friends (who chose to remain anonymous) had carved the AVM stone with a hammer and chisel as a test of willingness to believe in mystery artifacts (and "for fun"). They also revealed that the odd runes on the second line were supposed to read "ALU" (a pagan magical invocation) in an older style of runes, but the chisel had slipped.

Breaking the news on November 5 on behalf of the Special Committee, Scott Wolter — who had found "specific points that bothered me" during his scientific investigation — accepted the confession, saying "I give them credit for coming forward and admitting it." Westin was less forgiving: She had paid for transportation of the stone to its initial safe storage and had devoted time and energy that could have gone "into my work, where it belonged." Gade stated that the confession was made specifically because "We saw that people were being asked to make financial contributions to have the rock tested ... we didn't feel it would be right to carry this further." She also said "I'm sorry that people spent their time and money on the stone, but it was clearly a fake."

Local researcher Barry Hanson, in a book he was then writing about the original Kensington Runestone, explained the main concerns that had emerged before the confession. The scientific testing had quickly shown that the carved surfaces had too much iron pyrite, which ought long ago to have oxidized to ferrous sulfate if the carving was genuinely ancient. Also, the site, though an island in 2001, ought to have been under water in 1363.

== See also ==
- Elbow Lake Runestone, another hoax planted in Minnesota
