= America Unearthed =

American television series

- Genre: Entertainment
- Presented by: Scott Wolter
- Country of origin: United States
- Original language: English
- No. of seasons: 4
- No. of episodes: 49

Production
- Executive producers: Andy Awes; Maria Awes
- Camera setup: Multiple
- Running time: 43 minutes
- Production company: Committee Films

Original release
- Network: H2
- Release: December 21, 2012 – January 31, 2015
- Network: Travel Channel
- Release: May 28 – July 30, 2019

America Unearthed is an American entertainment television series and the first original series to air on the A&E Networks channel H2. The show premiered on December 21, 2012, and was produced by Committee Films of Minneapolis, Minnesota. The program was hosted by Minnesota-based geologist Scott Wolter, who investigates mysteries and artifacts believed to reveal an alternative history of the North American continent before the United States.

The show was canceled following the sale of H2. The Travel Channel revived the series for ten episodes, again hosted by Wolter. The revived series broadcast in 2019 and was canceled after just one season.

The show has been described as entertaining but also has received criticism for promoting pseudohistory.

== Predecessor ==
In September 2009, History Channel aired the two-hour special "Holy Grail in America", produced by Committee Films, which follows Scott Wolter as he explores the idea that the Kensington Runestone is evidence that the Knights Templar sailed to America about one hundred years before Columbus's voyage.

Reviewer Paul Mavis characterized "Holy Grail in America" as enjoyable pseudoscientific entertainment in the tradition of the 1970s television series In Search of.... Mavis noted that, "tellingly, the doc never presents any other geologists who have alternative theories about Wolter's findings" but concluded, "who cares if it's true or not? It's fun."

== Reception ==
America Unearthed began airing on the H2 network in December 2012. The first episode, "American Maya Secrets", aired on the supposed end of the Mayan calendar and deals with a possible Mayan village in Georgia. The program was a success for the network, becoming "the #1 series of all time on H2" and was subsequently approved for a second season with production starting in early 2013. The series had an average of 765,000 viewers in early 2013 and surpassed one million viewers in January 2013.

== Episodes ==
=== Season 1 (2012–13) ===
No. overall	No. in season	Title	Original release date
1	1	"American Maya Secrets"	December 21, 2012
Wolter explores a government-restricted site in rural Georgia and believes it is connected to the ancient Maya civilization.
2	2	"Medieval Desert Mystery"	December 28, 2012
Wolter investigates a burial site in the mountains of Arizona and believes it may belong to a medieval Englishman.
3	3	"Great Lakes Copper Heist"	January 4, 2013
Wolter investigates the possibility that ancient copper mines in northern Michigan are possibly connected to the Minoan civilization and the Bronze Age.
4	4	"Giants in Minnesota"	January 11, 2013
Wolter visits a Minnesota farmer to investigate bones the farmer believes may be from a Norse giant.
5	5	"A Deadly Sacrifice"	January 18, 2013
Wolter investigates a large boulder from the Arkansas River inscribed with a bull symbol, stating that it could be very old or recent and very weathered.
6	6	"Stonehenge in America"	January 25, 2013
The idea that America's Stonehenge is related to England's Stonehenge and that ancient Phoenicians are common to both, is investigated.
7	7	"Mystery of Roanoke"	February 1, 2013
Wolter examines a series of clues that have been largely ignored and considered frauds may be related to the Lost Colony of Roanoke.
8	8	"Chamber Hunting"	February 8, 2013
Wolter heads to rural Pennsylvania to investigate an underground stone chamber he thinks may have been a ritual bath chamber for a secret society.
9	9	"Motive for Murder"	February 15, 2013
Wolter investigates the death of Meriwether Lewis and questions Lewis's suicide.
10	10	"The Desert Cross"	February 22, 2013
Wolter and his son Grant investigate the Tucson artifacts, thirty-one lead objects including crosses, swords and other relics pulled from the desert in the 1920s.
11	11	"Tracking The Templars"	March 1, 2013
Wolter investigates the possibility that a symbol known as the "Hooked X" is unique to the Knights Templar and the Freemasons. Wolter went on to investigate the Narragansett Runestone which was stolen at the time.
12	12	"America's Oldest Secret"	March 8, 2013
The alleged Newport Tower connection to Knights Templar who came to America centuries ago, is researched.
13	13	"Hunt for the Holy Grail"	March 15, 2013
A treasure hunter invites Wolter along on his quest to find the Holy Grail in a well on the property of a rumored Templar prince.

=== Season 2 (2013–14) ===
No. overall	No. in season	Title	Original release date
14	1	"Ark of the Covenant"	November 30, 2013
Wolter investigates whether the Ark of the Covenant could be in America.
15	2	"New World Order"	December 7, 2013
Claims that the New World Order was behind the Denver International Airport and the Georgia Guidestones are investigated.
16	3	"Great Wall of Texas"	December 14, 2013
A wall supposed to exist below Rockwall, Texas is investigated...and debunked as purely natural.
17	4	"Vikings in America"	December 21, 2013
Vikings are widely accepted to have come to Newfoundland in 1000 A.D. The show investigates claims that they may have ventured farther south to the land now known as the US.
18	5	"Grand Canyon Treasure"	December 28, 2013
The show investigates claims that in 1909, Egyptian treasure may have been discovered in a Grand Canyon cave.
19	6	"Lost Tribe of Menehune"	January 4, 2014
The show investigates the Hawaiian legends of the Menehune.
20	7	"Secret Blueprint of America"	January 11, 2014
The show investigates claims the Megalithic Yard was used in designing the layout of Washington, D.C.
21	8	"The Underwater Pyramids"	January 18, 2014
The show investigates pyramids believed to have been built in Lake Mills, Wisconsin and other parts of the midwestern US, and their claimed connections to the Aztecs.
22	9	"Mystery of the Serpents"	January 25, 2014
The Serpent Mound, the Mound Builders, Native America, Scotland and astronomy are discussed.
23	10	"Lost Relics of the Bible"	February 1, 2014
Ancient Hebrew writings and artifacts are investigated, including some that are claimed to pre-date Christopher Columbus arriving at America.
24	11	"Swamp Mammoth"	February 8, 2014
Ancient human remains and mammoth bones with carvings on them found in a bog in Florida are investigated as potential evidence for the Solutrean hypothesis.
25	12	"Lincoln's Secret Assassins"	February 15, 2014
The show investigates the idea that a secretive group known as the Knights of the Golden Circle funded and had other connections with Abraham Lincoln's assassin John Wilkes Booth and Booth's co-conspirators. It goes on to suggest that the Knights included among their membership some of the most prominent figures of the Civil War-era South and the possibility that the Knights evolved into the New World Order.
26	13	"The Spearhead Conspiracy"	February 22, 2014
After a spearhead bearing a resemblance to Mesoamerican artifacts is found in Maui, Scott Wolter investigates the possibility that this represents a connection between Polynesians and Pre-Columbian North America.

=== Season 3 (2014–15) ===
No. overall	No. in season	Title	Original release date
27	1	"Secrets From the Alamo"	November 8, 2014
Scott Wolter investigates the possibility that Davy Crockett may have survived the Battle of the Alamo, and reviews evidence in favor of this claim.
28	2	"Guardians of Superstition Mountain"	November 15, 2014
Scott Wolter searches for the possible location of the Lost Dutchman Gold Mine in the Superstition Mountains of Arizona.
29	3	"The Appalachian Giant"	November 22, 2014
30	4	"Montezuma's Gold"	November 29, 2014
31	5	"Custer's Blood Treasure"	December 6, 2014
32	6	"Captain Kidd's Pirate Code"	December 13, 2014
33	7	"Marco Polo Discovers America"	December 20, 2014
34	8	"The Plot to Steal America"	December 27, 2014
35	9	"The Blood Stone"	January 3, 2015
36	10	"Egyptian Secrets of New York City"	January 10, 2015
37	11	"Tracking Bigfoot"	January 17, 2015
38	12	"The Templars' Deadliest Secret: The Chase"	January 24, 2015
39	13	"The Templars' Deadliest Secret: Evidence Exposed"	January 31, 2015

=== Season 4 (2019) ===
No. overall	No. in season	Title	Original release date
40	1	"Vikings in the Desert"	May 28, 2019
Scott Wolter examines evidence that the Vikings made it to the West Coast of America using the Northwest Passage.
41	2	"Alien Artifacts"	June 4, 2019
Scott Wolter travels to Mexico to investigate alleged alien artefacts and cave inscriptions said to depict contact between indigenous peoples and extraterrestrials.
42	3	"Cave of Secrets"	June 11, 2019
The show looks at whether a cave in Pennsylvania may have been used for different things in the past, including the Underground Railroad and secret society rituals.
43	4	"The Ripper Unmasked"	June 18, 2019
Following a tip concerning the Victorian serial killer's possible identity, Scott Wolter travels to London in an attempt to discover who Jack the Ripper might have been.
44	5	"Phoenicians in America"	June 25, 2019
Artifacts, petroglyphs and medieval maps are examined to see if the Phoenicians traveled to America in ancient times.
45	6	"The Spy who Saved America"	July 2, 2019
Scott Wolter examines various theories on the identity of '355', the female spy who helped George Washington defeat the British forces in the Revolutionary War.
46	7	"Bigfoot of the Bayou"	July 9, 2019
After listening to eyewitness accounts and examining some recent video evidence, Scott Wolter spends a night in the Louisiana Honey Island Swamp hoping to encounter the local Cryptid of legend.
47	8	"Drake's Lost Treasure"	July 16, 2019
The show examines various theories that Sir Francis Drake staked out a land claim in California for the English Crown in the late 16th century and that he may have deposited a large treasure somewhere on the West Coast of America.
48	9	"Chicago's Mystery Bomber"	July 23, 2019
Scott Wolter looks at historical evidence and conducts an experiment with live explosives, in an attempt to ascertain who the mystery bomber might have been that carried out the Chicago Haymarket attack of 1886.
49	10	"Exodus of the Templars"	July 30, 2019
The flight of the Knights Templar from France in 1307 is re-examined after evidence of a possible Templar landing in Newfoundland is uncovered.
