= Paul Knutson =

14th-century Norwegian law officer

Paul Knutson (Pål Knutsson) was a 14th-century law officer in Bergen, Norway.

== Biography ==
In the 1340s Pål Knutsson was an ombudsman who owned much of the Tveit farm on Tysnesøya in Hordaland. By 1348 he had been promoted to judge of the Gulating within the district of Gulen. In November 1354 Pål Knutsson was commissioned by King Magnus of Sweden and Norway to travel to Greenland and to assess the state of affairs there^{*}.

The Bishop of Gardar in Greenland as well as the Bishops of Oslo, Bergen, Stavanger, Hamar, Orkney, as well as Iceland (Skalholt and Holar), were subject to the Archdiocese of Nidaros. Gardar diocese in Greenland was without a bishop during the decade following the death of Bishop Árni in 1347. Greenland was without a Bishop until Bishop Álfur was ordained in 1368. Ivar Bardarson served as principal of the diocese during the interim period. Ivar Bardarson was appointed Canon at the Bergen Cathedral after having spent time in Greenland as a substitute for the Bishop of the diocese. Bardsson expressed concern about the preservation of Christianity among the settlers in the Western Settlement of Greenland .

King Magnus however was ruling Norway only as regent for his son, King Haakon, who came of age a few months later. There is no evidence that the proposed expedition ever sailed, except for the negative evidence that the 1354 order seems to be the only document mentioning Knutson after 1348. Although this indicates that Knutson survived the arrival of the Black Death (Svartedauden) plague at Bergen in 1349, many other government officials throughout the country did not. Arne Einarsson Vade, Archbishop of Nidaros, died in 1349 during the Black Death, along with the entire diocese staff and a breakdown in record-keeping means that it is very difficult to tell what was actually happening in the years following the plague.

Some later day historians, including Hjalmar Holand, have asserted that Knutson's expedition may have journeyed deep into North America and created the Kensington Runestone.

== Note ==
^* Unlike most earlier documents relating to Knutson, this order only survives via a 16th-century Danish translation, so its precise significance is open to interpretation.

== Other sources ==
- Bardarson, I. (ed. Jónsson, F.) Det gamle Grønlands beskrivelse af Ívar Bárðarson (Copenhagen, 1930)
- Hjalmar R. Holand Westward from Vinland: An Account of Norse explorations and Discoveries in Amerika, 982-1362 (Meredith Publishing Co., 1940)
