= Solem Township, Douglas County, Minnesota =

Solem Township, Minnesota
- Township
- Location within the state of Minnesota Solem Township, Minnesota (the United States)
- Coordinates: 45°48′15″N 95°41′0″W
- Country: United States
- State: Minnesota
- County: Douglas

Area
  - Total: 35.9 sq mi (92.9 km^{2})
  - Land: 33.9 sq mi (87.8 km^{2})
  - Water: 1.9 sq mi (5.0 km^{2})
- Elevation: 1,348 ft (411 m)

Population (2000)
  - Total: 239
  - Density: 7.0/sq mi (2.7/km^{2})
- Time zone: UTC-6 (Central (CST))
  - Summer (DST): UTC-5 (CDT)
- FIPS code: 27-61078
- GNIS feature ID: 0665639

Solem Township is a township in Douglas County, Minnesota, United States. The population was 232 at the 2020 census.

Solem Township was organized in 1870, and is said to be named after a place in Norway. The farm where the Kensington Runestone, of questionable authenticity, was said to have been found is now a local park in Solem Township.

== Geography ==
According to the United States Census Bureau, the township has a total area of 35.9 square miles (92.9 km^{2}), of which 33.9 square miles (87.9 km^{2}) is land and 1.9 square miles (5.0 km^{2}) (5.41%) is water.

== Demographics ==
As of the census of 2000, there were 239 people, 90 households, and 64 families residing in the township. The population density was 7.0 people per square mile (2.7/km^{2}). There were 101 housing units at an average density of 3.0/sq mi (1.1/km^{2}). The racial makeup of the township was 96.65% White, 0.42% African American, 1.26% Native American, 0.42% Asian, 0.42% from other races, and 0.84% from two or more races. Hispanic or Latino of any race were 1.26% of the population.

There were 90 households, out of which 30.0% had children under the age of 18 living with them, 66.7% were married couples living together, 3.3% had a female householder with no husband present, and 27.8% were non-families. 20.0% of all households were made up of individuals, and 8.9% had someone living alone who was 65 years of age or older. The average household size was 2.66 and the average family size was 3.12.

In the township the population was spread out, with 24.7% under the age of 18, 5.0% from 18 to 24, 26.4% from 25 to 44, 25.5% from 45 to 64, and 18.4% who were 65 years of age or older. The median age was 42 years. For every 100 females, there were 115.3 males. For every 100 females age 18 and over, there were 114.3 males.

The median income for a household in the township was $34,688, and the median income for a family was $41,875. Males had a median income of $26,563 versus $14,167 for females. The per capita income for the township was $18,016. About 2.9% of families and 4.8% of the population were below the poverty line, including none of those under the age of eighteen and 4.0% of those 65 or over.
