= Heavener Runestone Park =

55-acre park in Oklahoma

- Location within Oklahoma Location within the United States
- Location: Le Flore County, Oklahoma, United States
- Nearest city: Heavener, OK
- Coordinates: 34.9°N 94.578056°W
- Area: 55 acres (22 ha)
- Established: 1970
- Governing body: City of Heavener, Oklahoma
- Website: www.travelok.com/listings/view.profile/id.3398

Heavener Runestone Park (pronounced /ˈhiːvnər/) is a 55-acre (220,000 m^{2}) park located in Le Flore County, Oklahoma near the city of Heavener, Oklahoma. Formerly a state park of Oklahoma, it was transferred to the City of Heavener in 2011, and is now operated by the Friends of Heavener Runestone, a non-profit organization. The Festival held at the park serves as a fundraiser for operating and maintaining the park.

Opened in 1970, the park has been erected around the Heavener Runestone, a rock found in 1923. The stone is located on Poteau Mountain just outside the town's limits in the scrub-forest foothills of the Ouachita Mountains.

== Assessment of the runestone ==
Media state that the inscription was probably a claim marker meaning "valley belonging to Glome," or "Glome's Valley." There is no evidence of Norse presence and nothing similar has been found anywhere near Heavener or even in the Midwestern United States. Two additional sandstone slabs, each with short runic markings, were each found a mile north and south of the stone. Scandinavian presence in the nearby town of Heavener is early and the likeliest source of the carving of the stone.

== Runestone Festival ==
The park became the site for the annual Heavener Runestone Festival Fundraiser in 2011. Features of the event include Celtic and folk music, swordplay, displays of a variety of merchant booths, games, a hike to view the runestone, and overnight camping. The cast and volunteers are all dressed in costume and many attendees dress up as well. The purpose of the festival, besides pure enjoyment, is fundraising to support the park.

== Park facilities ==
Heavener Park offers picnic tables, outdoor grills, primitive campsites with showers available, amphitheater, playground, hiking, exploring, and educational programs about the Runestone. The park also offers the top portion for private use for special events such as weddings, reunions, birthdays, etc. for a fee.

== Transfer from state to city park ==
The Oklahoma Tourism and Recreation Department announced in March 2011 that it would close the Heavener Runestone State Park on August 15, 2011, due to budget cuts. However, the City of Heavener agreed to assume ownership and operation of the 55-acre park beginning July 1, 2011. The park is now managed by a group of volunteers that make a 501c3 non profit organization.

== See also ==
- Oklahoma runestones
