= Spirit Pond runestones =

Stones with alleged runic inscriptions

Coordinates: 43.74833°N 69.80861°W

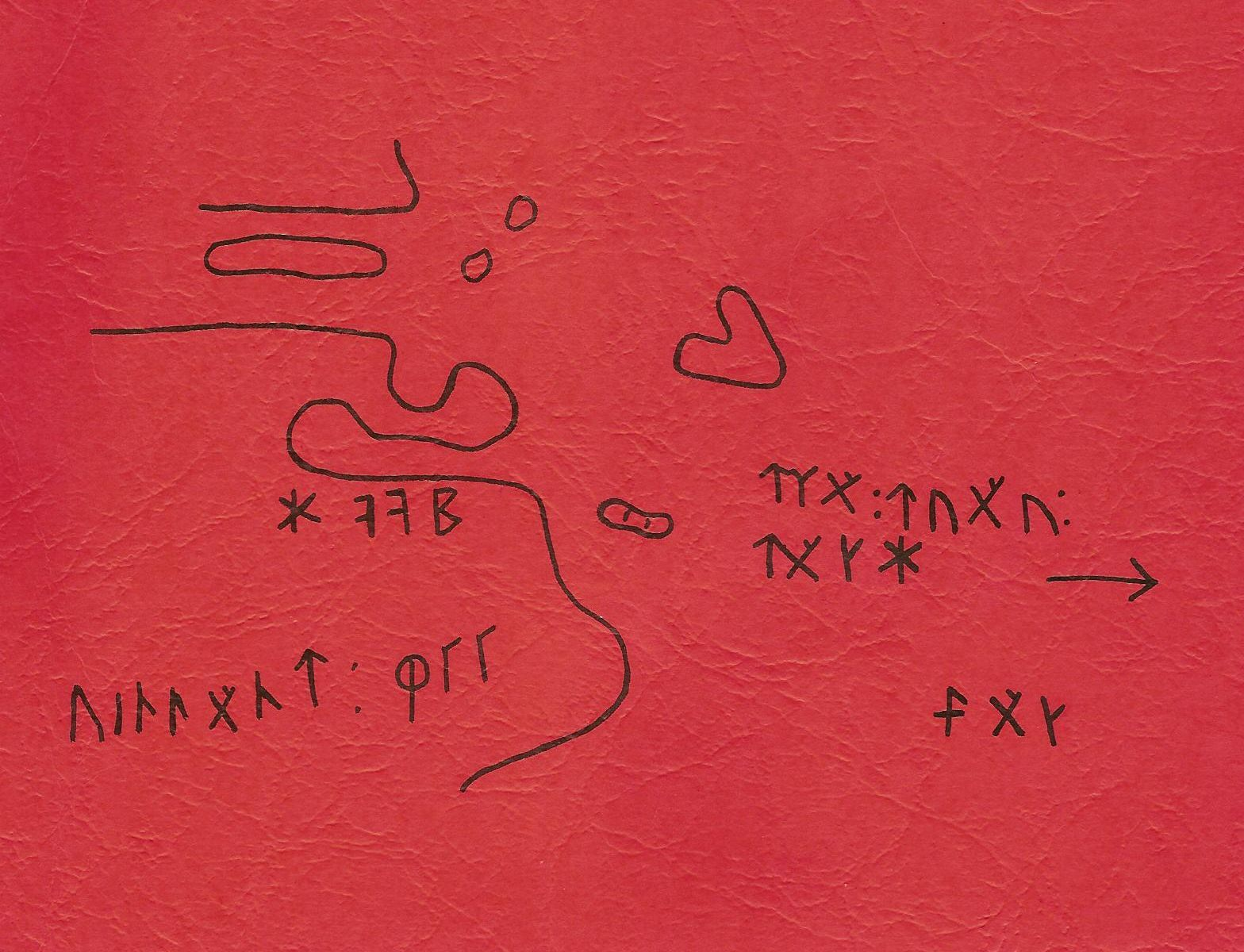
Inscription on the map stone

Edward Larsson's notes from 1885 show the use of pentadic runic numerals to replace the Arabic numerals.

The Spirit Pond runestones are three stones with alleged runic inscriptions, found at Spirit Pond in Phippsburg, Maine on May 27, 1971 by a Walter J. Elliott Jr., a carpenter born in Bath, Maine. The next week the discovery and photos was publicized in The Bath-Brunswick Times Record. After being told that they were state property he wired the official who had instructed him to give them to the state saying "Just returned from Phippsburg, reburied stones on state land near site for some other fool to find. Disgustingly yours." Four months later after letters to various people he received a reply from a Dr. Ole G. Landsverk who told Elliott and the press they were genuine Viking artefacts. On December 3, 1971, a Maine newspaper published an editorial saying it was settled that the Vikings were here four centuries before Columbus. Elliott then asked $4500 for the stones but neither the state of Maine nor its museums could afford that amount. An anonymous Philadelphia citizen paid it and the Maine State Museum finally was able to buy them in January 1972. The museum then asked Einar Haugen to examine them.

The stones, currently housed at the Maine State Museum, are widely dismissed as a hoax or a fraud.

== Reception ==
Unlike the prehistoric monumental runestones raised in Scandinavia, the Maine stones are small handheld objects similar to the authentic Kingittorsuaq Runestone found in Greenland in 1824. The stone with the map (which Haugen numbered 1), is a flat stone about 7 by 5 inches. The second stone is more rounded and about 5 by 6 with a short inscription on one side, while the third is fairly flat, 6 x 10, and carries the main inscriptions.

A fourth stone was discovered at some point and publicized in 1975. Made of hard diorite it has a thong-hole bored into it and for that a reason has been described as an amulet. Archaeologist Erik Wahlgren writes that on one side is the inscription "uin 'Vin'(land) and two symbols intended to represent the date 1010..." The other side has a cross inscribed on it.

When the New England Antiquities Research Association learned of their existence it investigated them and then asked Einar Haugen to examine them. In 1974, after transcribing, he found the individual runes used to be inconsistent with 11th century Old Norse, and that the text contains only "a few Norse words in a sea of gibberish". He also noted peculiarities relating the inscriptions directly to the Kensington Runestone inscription. Thus, he concluded that the inscriptions were most likely created after 1932.He was able to do a transliteration but not a translation as Wahlgren wrote, "as portions of the text appear to be scrambled or distorted in some way in order to impede too ready a full interpretation ...". After comparing the runes to those on the Kensington Runestone he concluded that they were clearly related, the Kensington stone being the elder. As the date on it is about 350 years older than the Kensington stone, Professor Erik Wahlgren has called it "a hoax on a hoax."

One of the three stones, the map stone contains a map, making it unique as there are no other runestone maps. The map is drawn like a modern map and shows the modern-day coastline of the area rather than depicting how it would have looked at the time it was allegedly made. It includes an arrow with the inscription "T(o) Ka(nada) two days." "Kanada" is the spelling used today in Sweden, but the name Canada was not used before 1535. Associated sketches include grapes, a flying duck, what appear to be Indians, one paddling a canoe, and others, none of which look like those seen on authenticated runestones. Wahlgren suggests that was intended to suggest that the Vinland of the sagas was associated with Maine. An entry in Medieval Scandinavia: an Encyclopedia says map and text 'include a cluster of grapes, a figure rowing a canoe, an animal pelt, a slingshot or ballista, a rattle, a human face and, as a droll substitute for the whale of Mrhallr veidimadr (“huntsman"), a sea-serpent. Unlike the Kensington Slone, the Spirit Pond group includes personal names: “Haakon" and “Norse folk’s Ja[c]k," who may be the otherwise anonymous author. The entire concoction is a humorous satire on the Kensington stone, the Vin land sagas, the Vinland Map, the theory of runic cryptograms, and, perhaps, the Loch Ness monster.

Wahlgren notes that the creator or creators could not have spoken any Scandinavian dialect, old or new, and must have used a dictionary to create the stones. He suggests they were created as a joke, commenting that "Whatever the precise meaning of this word or that, the petroglyphs are in the aggregate a witty commentary on the perennial struggle between reason and credulity, between our respect for evidence and our desire to shape a flattering past."

Amateur researchers have been more sympathetic to a medieval origin of the stones. Suzanne Carlson of NEARA, a group of enthusiasts who believe there was a widespread Viking presence in North America, suggests a mid 14th century date for the inscriptions, although it is unclear how Carlson arrived at this date. Similarly, amateur rune-enthusiast Richard Nielsen claims a precise date of 1401.

== See also ==
- Maine penny, a Norwegian coin supposedly found in a prehistoric Maine archaeological site
