= Runic calendar =

Perpetual calendar based on the 19-year-long Metonic cycle of the Moon

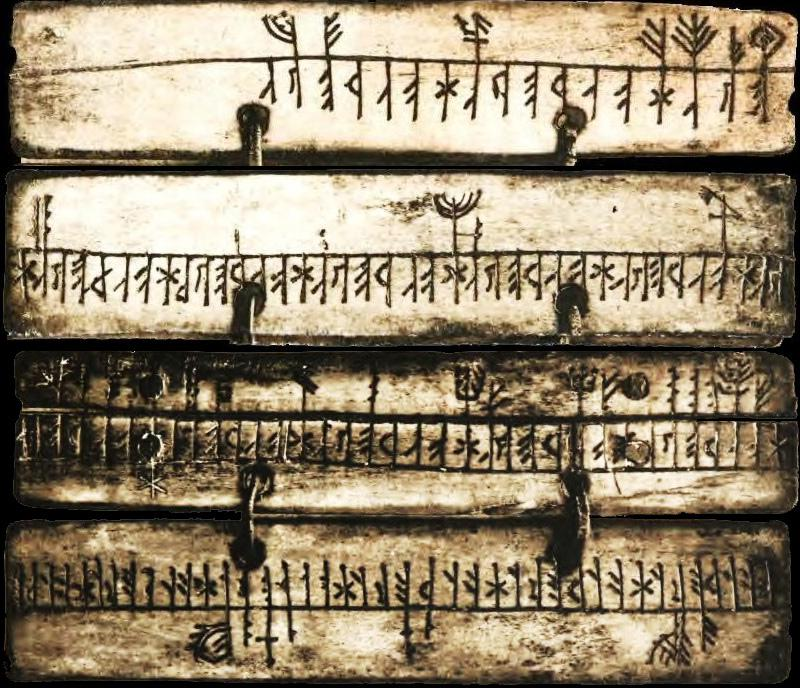
Younger furthark runic calendar.

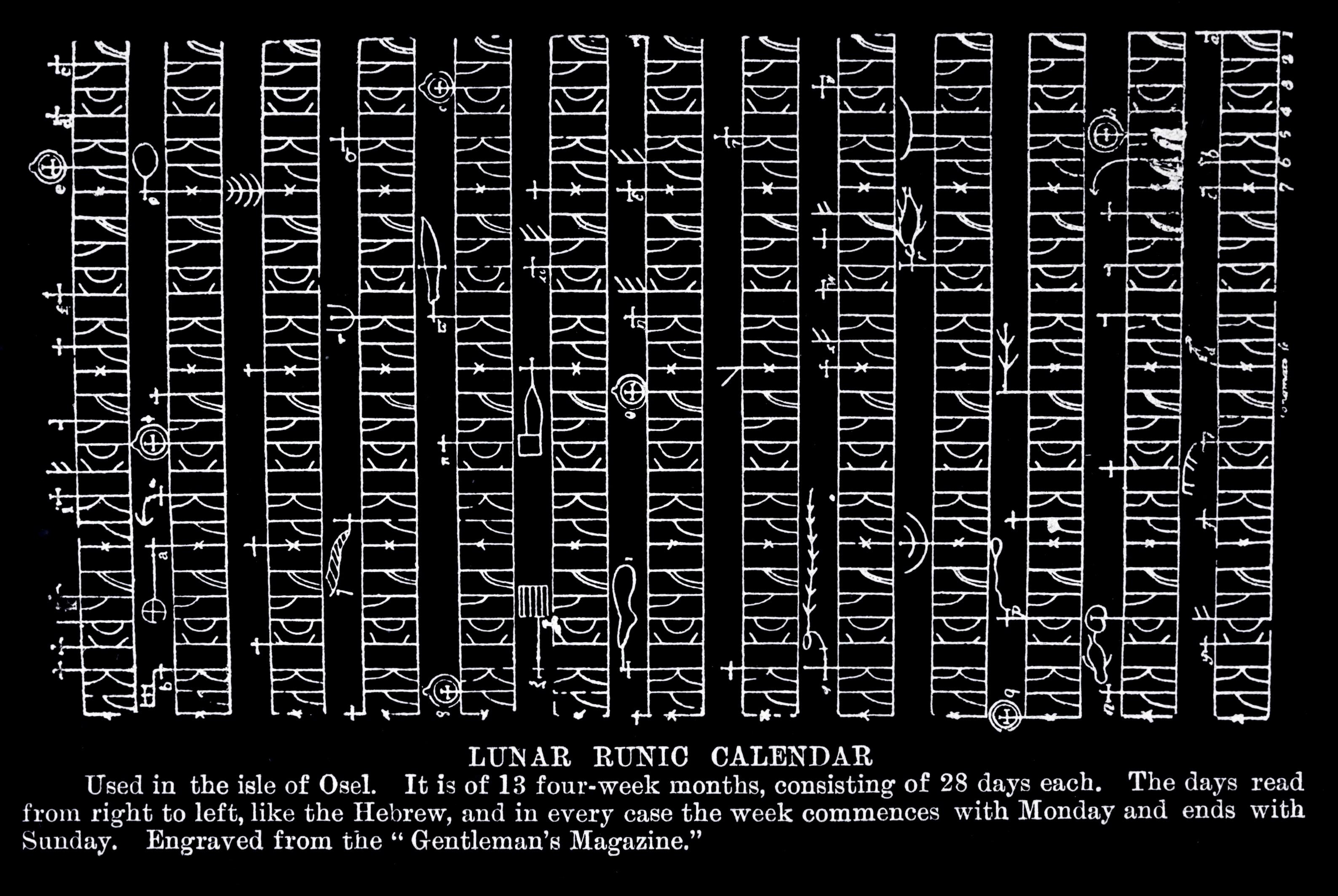
Runic calendar from the Estonian island of Saaremaa with each month on a separate wooden board.

A Runic calendar (also Rune staff or Runic almanac) is a perpetual calendar, variants of which were used in Northern Europe until the 19th century. A typical runic calendar consisted of several horizontal lines of symbols, one above the other, which are used to determine the days of the week for any day of the Gregorian (or Julian) calendar year, and also to predict moon phases. Special days like solstices, equinoxes, and celebrations (including Christian holidays and feasts) were marked with additional lines of symbols.

Runic calendars were written on parchment or carved onto staves of wood, bone, or horn. The oldest one known, and the only one from the Middle Ages, is a staff from Nyköping, Sweden, believed to date from the 13th century. Most of the several thousand which survive are wooden calendars dating from the 16th and the 17th centuries. During the 18th century, Runic calendars had a renaissance as antiques, and runic calendars dating from around 1800 were made in the form of brass tobacco boxes.

== Marks ==
On one line, 52 weeks of 7 days were laid out using 52 repetitions of the first seven runes of the Younger Futhark. The runes corresponding to each weekday varied from year to year.

On another line, many of the days were marked with one of 19 symbols representing the 19 Golden numbers, for the years of the Metonic cycle. In early calendars, each of the 19 years in the cycle was represented by a rune; the first 16 were the 16 runes of the Younger Futhark, plus three special runes improvised for the remaining three years: (árlaug; Golden Number 17), (tvímaðr; Golden Number 18), and (belgþórr; Golden Number 19). In 1636, Ole Worm documented the Younger Futhark numeral system, including these three characters, in his Runir seu Danica literatura antiquissima (Runes: the oldest Danish literature).

The new moon would always fall on the day with the same number as the year of the cycle. For example, in the 18th year of the cycle, the new moons would fall on all the dates marked with tvímaðr, the symbol for year 18. Later calendars used Pentadic numerals for the values 1–19.

Arabic	1	2	3	4	5	6	7	8	9	10	11	12	13	14	15	16	17	18	19
Golden Numbers	ᚠ	ᚢ	ᚦ	ᚬ	ᚱ	ᚴ	ᚼ	ᚾ	ᛁ	ᛅ	ᛋ	ᛏ	ᛒ	ᛚ	ᛘ	ᛦ	ᛮ	ᛯ	ᛰ

A version using the Latin alphabet for weekdays and Arabic numerals for the golden numbers was printed in 1498 as part of the Breviarium Scarense.

== Norway ==
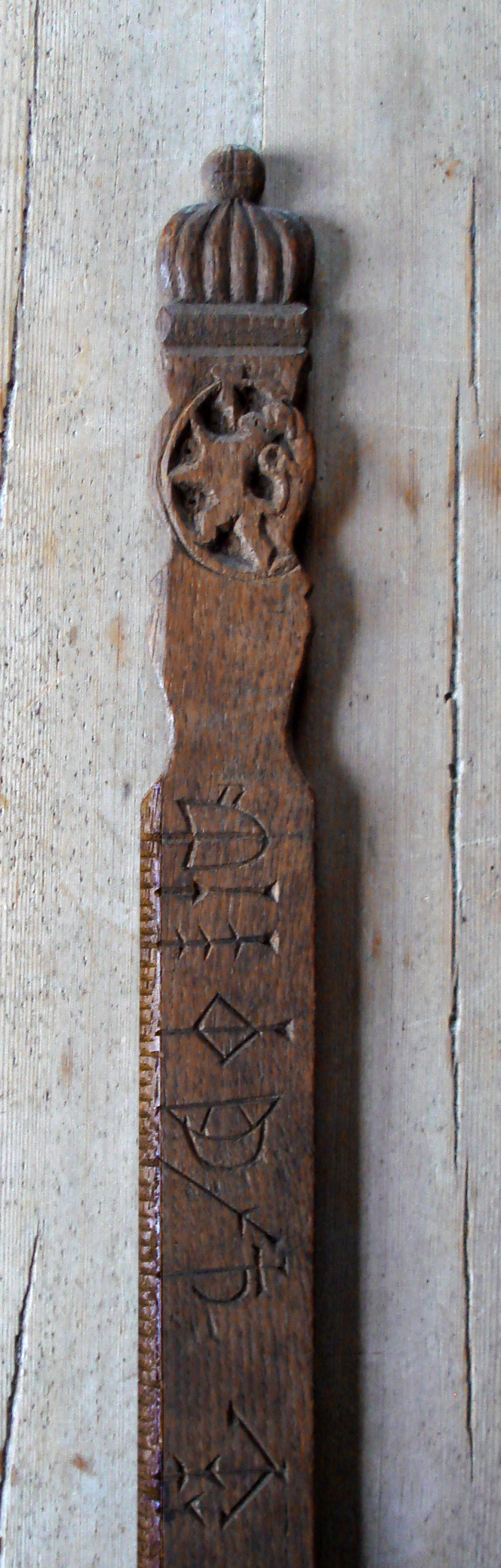
Primstav from Hallingdal with coat of arms of Norway, 17th century.

A primstav is the ancient Norwegian calendar stick. These were engraved with images instead of runes. The images depicted the different nonmoving religious holidays. The oldest primstav still in existence is from 1457 and is kept at the National Museum of Denmark.

== Estonia ==
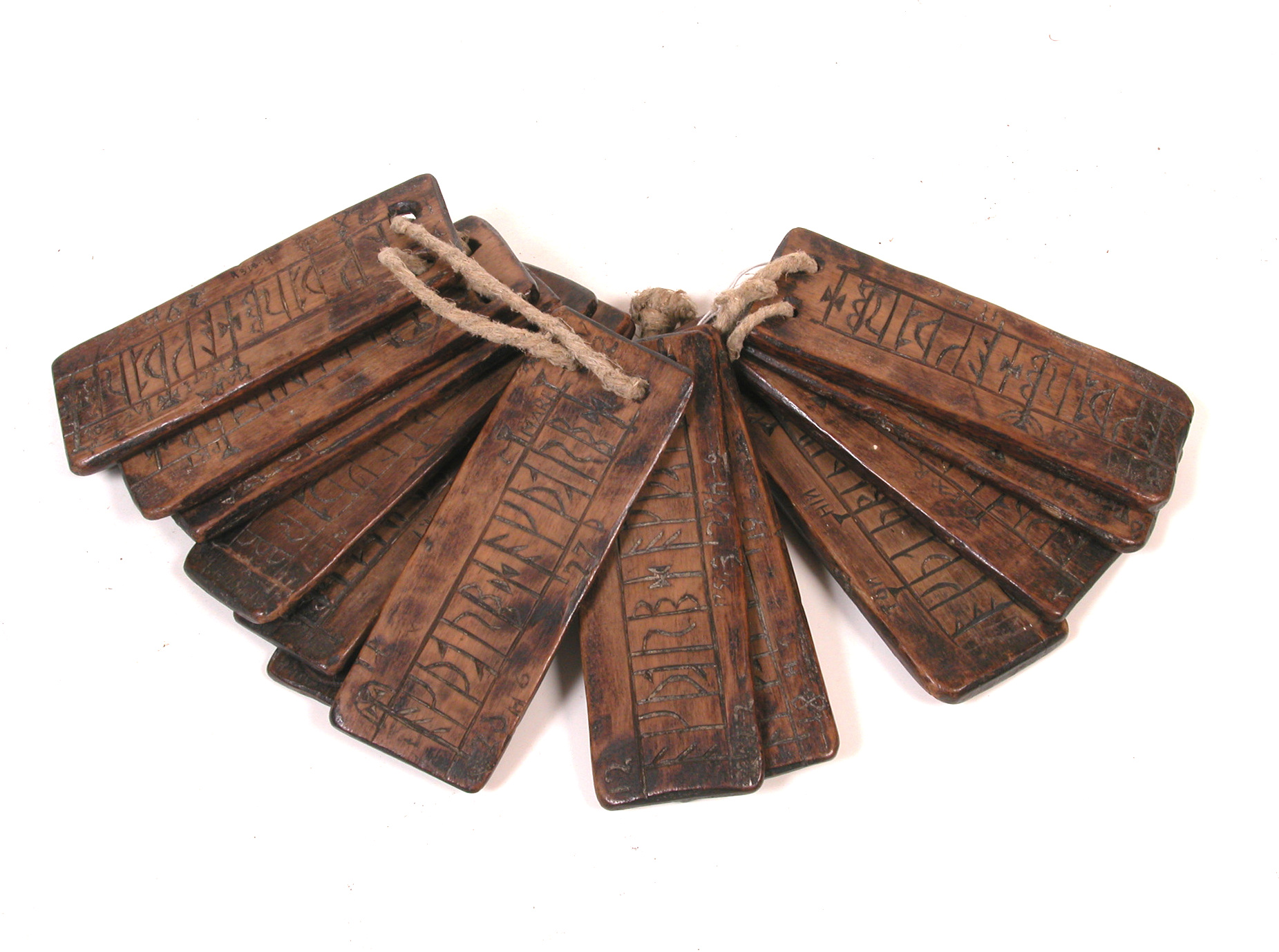
This original wooden sirvikalender currently held by the Estonian National Museum, is estimated to have been created between 1748 and 1761.

A sirvikalender, also called sirvilauad (singular: sirvilaud), or runnikalender is a pocket-sized Estonian lunar calendar, traditionally carved into small wooden tablets. These calendars are used by Estonians to track seasonal changes. The calendar uses symbols to denote moon phases and holidays, which is typical of runic calendars used throughout Northern Europe.

Adherents of the Estonian ethnic religion (Maausk) have published a sirvikalender every year since 1978. Until 1991, the calendar was an illegal samizdat publication under the Soviet government.

=== Structure ===
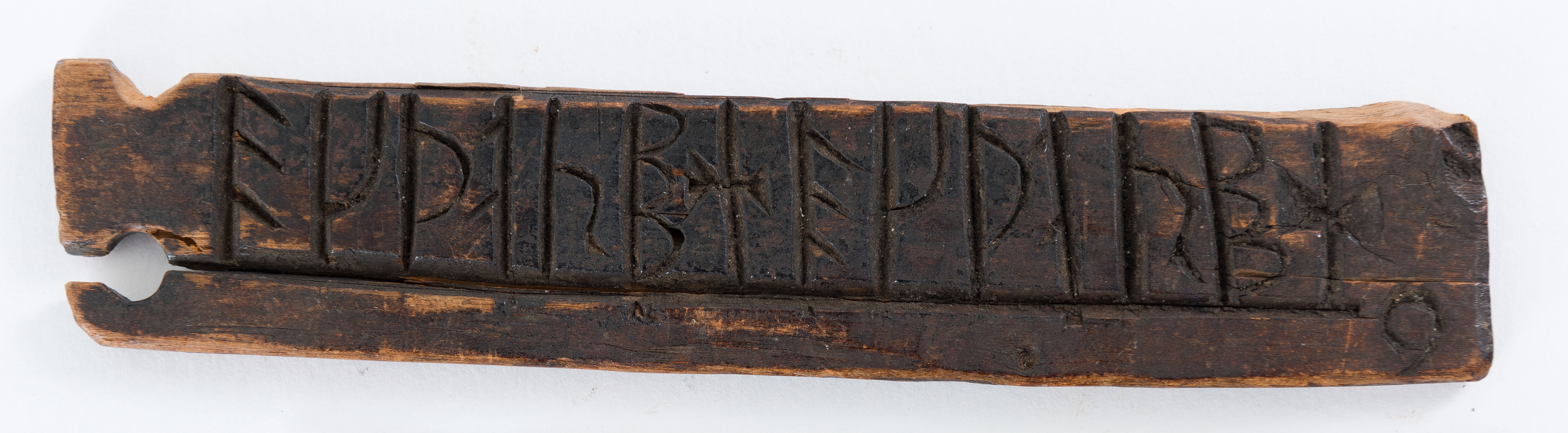
An Estonian sirvikalender with weathered wooden slats.

The name comes from the Estonian words sirvima, which means to flip through or browse, and laud, which means a board or tablet.

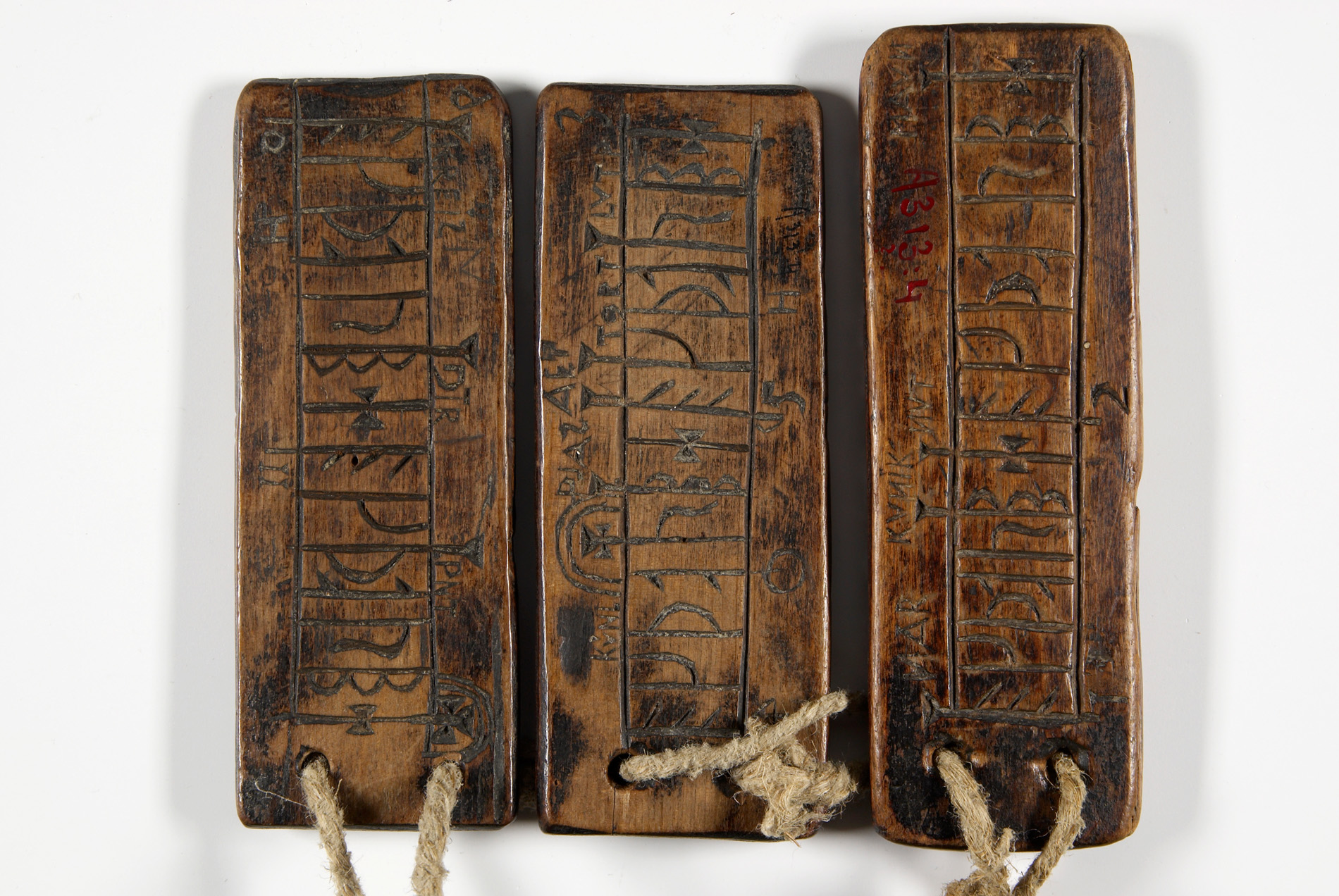
Held in the Estonian National Museum's collection since 1923, this 18th-century sirvikalender shows a close-up of the symbols used on these wooden calendars.

The calendar is made of several thin wooden boards tied together with a cord. This creates a small bundle that is easy to carry. The design is different from the wooden staves (like primstav) often used for calendars in Scandinavia. Instead, the sirvikalender is similar to calendars used by the Sámi people, which are also held together by a cord.

Signs that looked like objects were used to mark holidays on the sirvikalender. The markings on the boards utilize runic-like symbols to indicate the days of the week, lunar cycles, and important agricultural dates.

=== Function ===
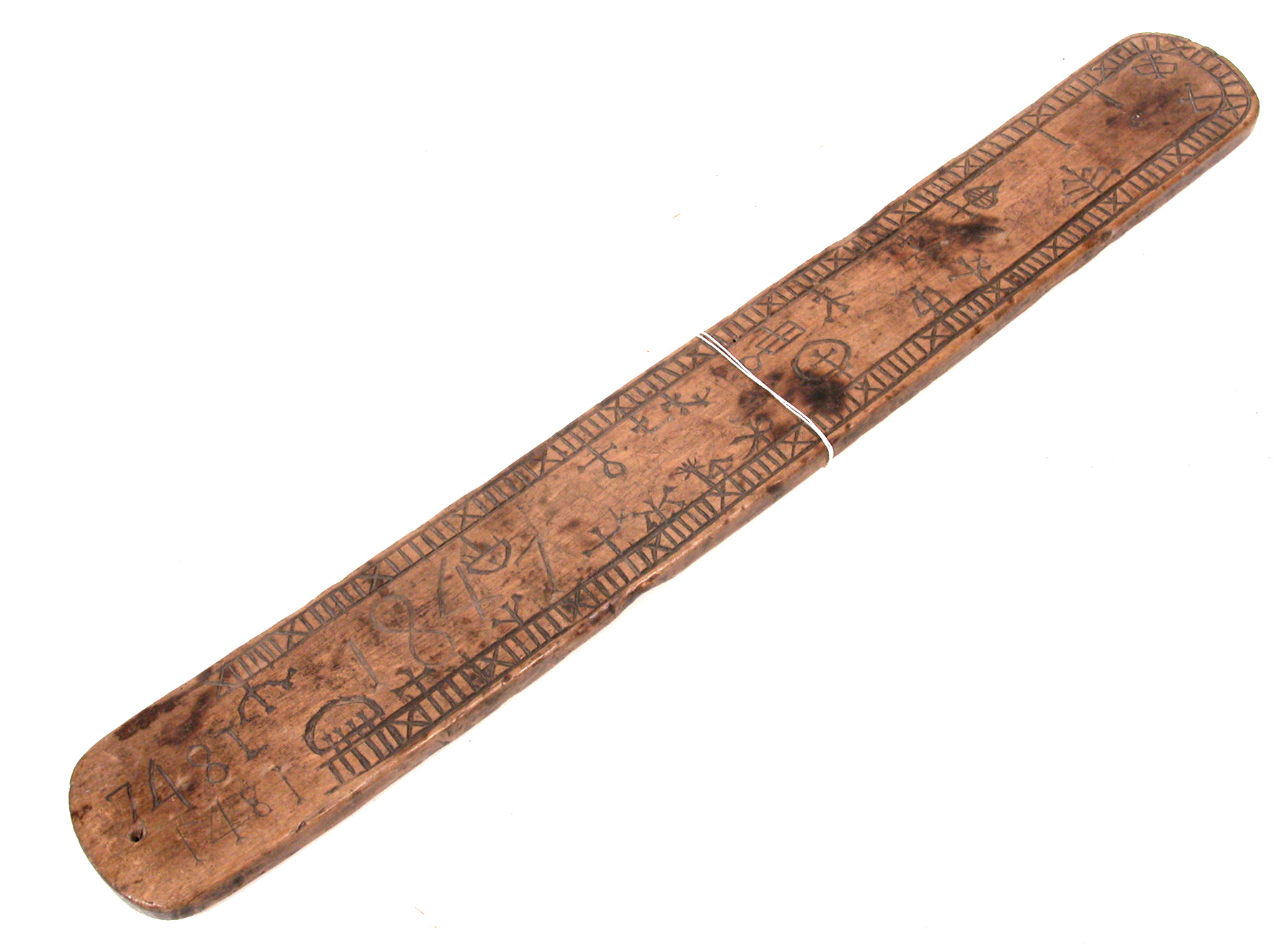
This 1841 sirvikalender originated from Henders Farm in the village of Pürksi, located within the historical Noarootsi parish in Estonia.

The logic of the sirvikalender is based on dividing time into hard (kõva aeg) and soft (pehme aeg) periods, and it suggests that certain jobs are more successful at certain moon phases due to observable factors in nature. Hard times happen during the new moon, full moon, and old moon. These times are good for tasks that need strength or durability. For instance, people traditionally believed that wood cut during a hard time would last longer and not rot, making it better for building houses. Soft times occur when the moon is growing or shrinking. These periods are linked to growth and flexibility. Modern users of the calendar suggest that planting to match these phases can help their crops grow better.

These cycles guided everyday life and spiritual beliefs. A new moon (noorkuu) is the best time to start new projects or build things that need to last. The growing waxing moon (kasvav kuu) is a time of increasing energy. The full moon (täiskuu) is a time of high energy, often chosen for picking medicinal herbs for potency. The waning or shrinking moon (kahanev kuu) is considered a better time for domestic cleaning and tasks intended to reduce or stop growth, and useful for processes that require breakdown. The old moon or vana kuuis better suited for finishing tasks like resolving problems or clearing brush to prevent regrowth.

=== History ===
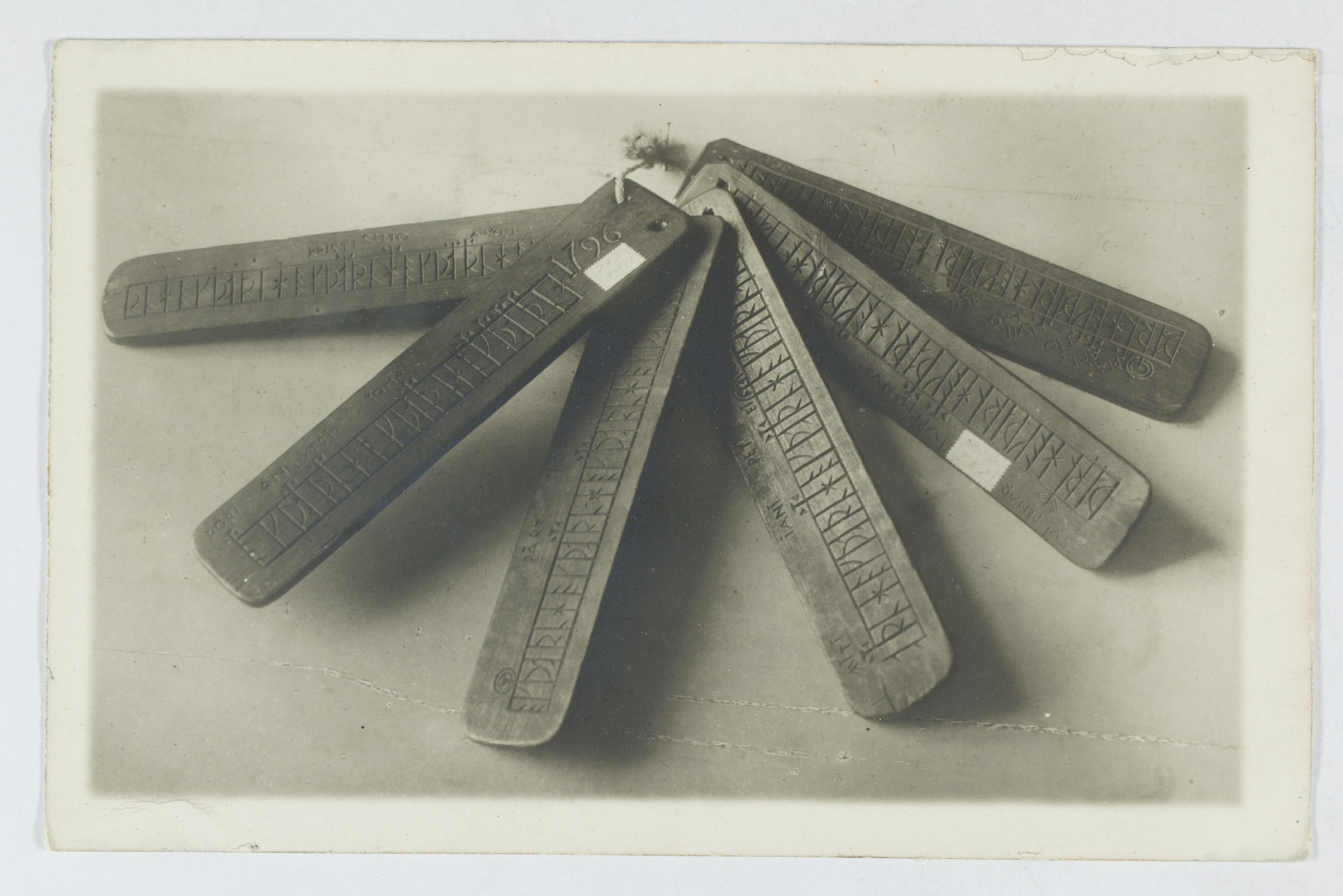
An Estonian sirvikalender from Hiiumaa held by the Estonian National Museum in Tartu.

The current dating system used in sirvikalender publications mark time since the Billingen event (sometimes referred to as the "birth of the land"). This event occurred roughly 10,000 years ago and led to the drainage of the Baltic Ice Lake, connecting the Baltic to the broader world ocean and exposing significant portions of Estonian land that had previously been underwater.

These calendars have been promoted through the Estonian native religion movement, Maausk. Since 1978, the Maavalla Koda, an organization promoting Maausk, has printed annual, modernized versions of the calendar that include traditional holiday names and moon phases.

The sirvikalendar was designed after close study of the environment to reflect the patterns and energy in nature. While today’s calendars are printed on paper instead of carved into wood, they still use the traditional names for holidays and the moon-based system. Members of Maausk have promoted use of the calendar in modern times. For example, meetings intended to launch a project might be scheduled during the new moon, whereas those focused on overcoming obstacles should ideally be deferred to the old moon.

== See also ==
- Computus Runicus
- Germanic calendar
- List of runestones
- Nationalencyklopedin
- Scythe sword
- Dominical letter
