= Pentadic numerals =

Scandinavian numeral system

Pentadic numerals are a notation for presenting numbers, usually by inscribing in wood or stone. The notation has been used in Scandinavia, usually in conjunction to runes.

The notation is similar to the older Roman numerals for numbers up to 9 (I–VIIII). Unlike the Roman notation, the ticks are placed vertically on a stem or stav of the rune. The number 4 is represented by four horizontal lines on the stem, 5 is represented by what looks like an inverted letter U. 10 is represented by two U's opposing each other. Numbers up to 19, or even 20, can be represented by a combination of I's and U's.

== History ==
The widest use of the notation is in presenting the golden numbers, 1–19 on runic calendars, also known as clogs). The numbers are commonly found in Modern Age and possibly Early Modern Age. It is unknown if they were in use in the Middle Ages, let alone in the Viking Age. On older runic calendar, a different notation for representing the golden numbers was used; the 16 letters of Younger Futhark represented the numbers from 1 to 16 with three special runes used for the numbers 17 to 19. The Computus Runicus, originally from 1343 put collected and published by Ole Worm in the 17th century used this notation.

Most runic texts, including the Viking age runestones use no number system, instead numbers are simply spelled out.

== Positional notation ==
Edward Larsson's notes from 1885 show the use of "pentadic" runic numerals to replace the Arabic numerals in representing dates.

In some peculiar instances runic numbers have been used as numerals in a base ten positional system, similar to the Arabic numbers. It is unknown if this use existed before the 19th century.

The oldest authenticated use is in the notes of an 18-year-old journeyman tailor, Edward Larsson, the contain the date 1885 in runes. A copy of the note was published by the Institute for Dialectology, Onomastics and Folklore Research in Umeå in 2004.

This positional notation however appears on two unrelated sets of rune stones allegedly discovered in North America. The first is the Kensington Runestone found in 1898, the second are the three Spirit Pond runestones found in 1971. Both refer to pre-Columbian Norse exploration of the Americas but are modern day hoaxes.

== See also ==
- Biquinary
- Ogham
