= Heavener, Oklahoma =

- City
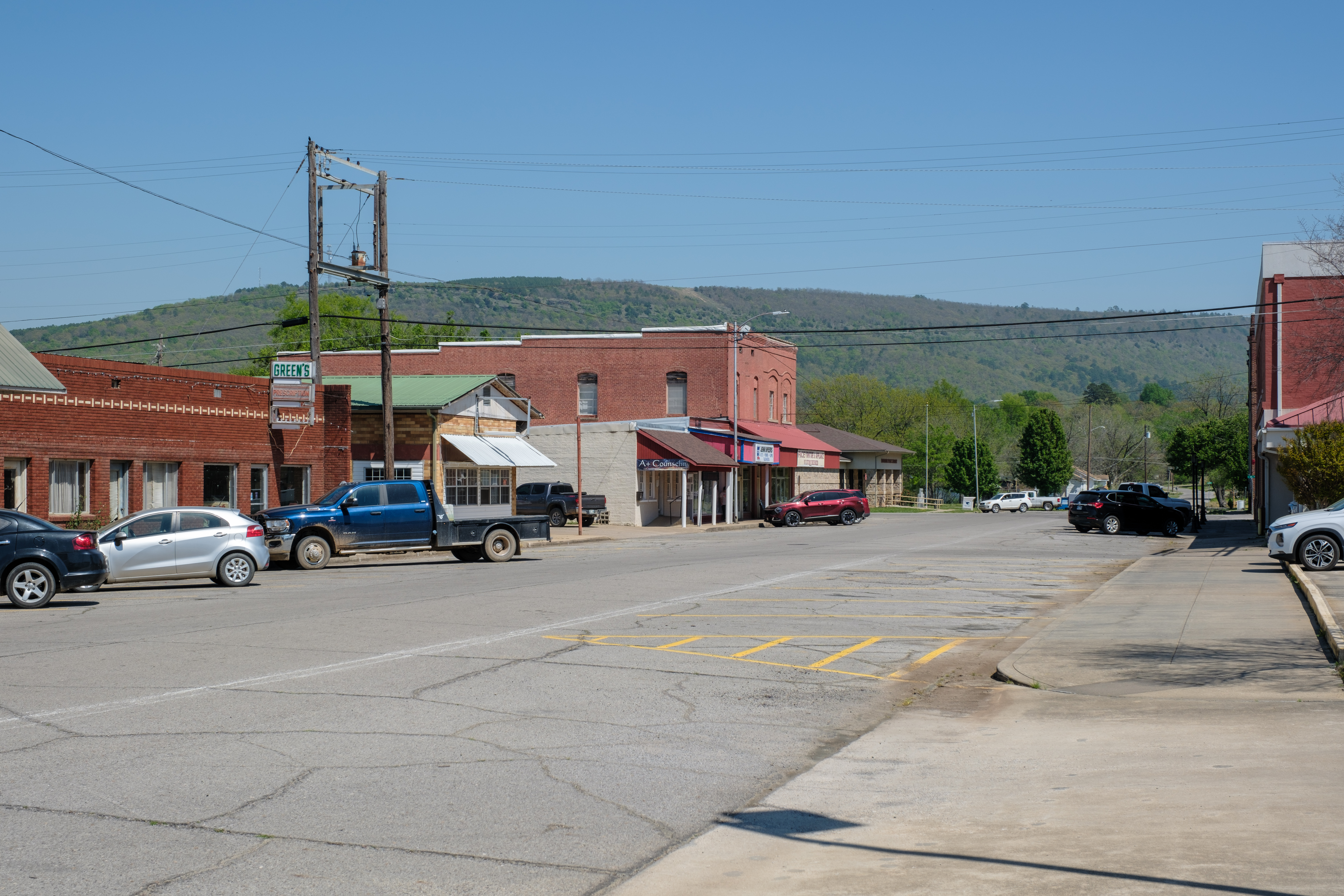

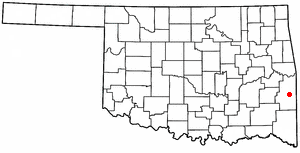
- Location of Heavener, Oklahoma
- Coordinates: 34°53′21″N 94°36′15″W
- Country: United States
- State: Oklahoma
- County: Le Flore
- Established: 1898

Area
  - Total: 4.92 sq mi (12.74 km^{2})
  - Land: 4.91 sq mi (12.71 km^{2})
  - Water: 0.012 sq mi (0.03 km^{2})
- Elevation: 610 ft (190 m)

Population (2020)
  - Total: 2,985
  - Density: 610/sq mi (235/km^{2})
- Time zone: UTC-6 (Central (CST))
  - Summer (DST): UTC-5 (CDT)
- ZIP code: 74937
- Area codes: 539/918
- FIPS code: 40-33400
- GNIS feature ID: 2410730
- Website: www.cityofheavener.com

Heavener /ˈhiːvnər/ is a town in Le Flore County, Oklahoma, United States. As of the 2020 census, Heavener had a population of 2,985. Heavener is notable for the Heavener Runestone just outside the city limits.

== History ==
Joseph H. Heavener and some other white settlers arrived, secured permits to farm from the Chocktaw Indians, and settled down to farm. In 1880, Zachary Taylor Ward and his Choctaw wife, Tabitha Hickman Ward, moved their store from Skullyville to the present site of Heavener. Ward died in 1883, and his widow, Tabitha, married Heavener. The couple owned the land on which the town was established. Before being named Heavener by a popular vote in 1895, the area was known by several different names, including Prairie of the Tall Grass, Choctaw City, Prairie View, Long Prairie, and Grand Prairie.

At the time of its founding, and through Oklahoma's statehood in 1907, Heavener was located in Sugar Loaf County, one of the counties making up the Moshulatubbee District of the Choctaw Nation.

Suitable agricultural land around Heavener attracted many farmers as settlers. Other improvements soon followed. A cotton gin and a grist mill were built in the town in 1885. In 1896 the Kansas City, Pittsburg and Gulf Railroad built tracks through the town. A post office was established in a boxcar on May 12, 1896, while another boxcar became the train station. In 1900-1901 a predecessor of the Arkansas Western Railroad constructed tracks from Heavener east into Arkansas.

The Curtis Act allowed Heavener to incorporate in Indian Territory in 1898; Henry Moore was elected as the first mayor. The town population was 254 in 1900 when the Kansas City Southern Railway purchased the rail line. The company established a roundhouse in 1910, making Heavener a division point. By 1910, the population was 780, and continued increasing to 1,850 by 1920.

Mining and timber came to the local economy in the 1930s. The 1930 census showed the population to be 2,269. The Burnett Lumber Company opened a sawmill in 1935. Then the population began declining: to 2,103 in 1950. Recovery began when the Heavener Charcoal Company began producing charcoal from its kilns in Heavener, shipping it to a plant in Arkansas. The 1970 census showed 2,566 residents in the town. However, the Burnett sawmill burned down in 1981.

Poultry farming became an important activity in the late 20th century. OK Foods established a hatchery in 1986. In 1992, the company built a poultry processing plant, followed by a poultry feed mill in 1995.

== Heavener Runestone ==
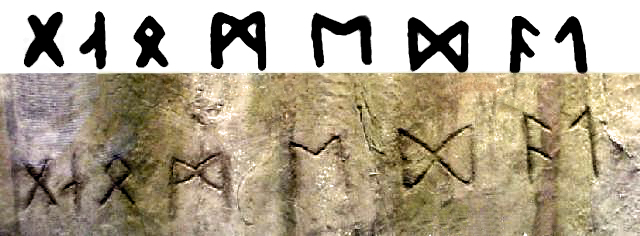
The Heavener Runestone

Heavener is best known for the Heavener Runestone, just outside the city limits in Heavener Runestone Park. The cryptic stone appears to have letters from the runic alphabet, some people speculate that it was etched by pre-Columbian Norsemen. Owing to this purported connection, Carl Albert State College in the nearby city of Poteau changed its mascot in the early 1990s from the "Trojan" to the "Viking."

== Geography ==
According to the United States Census Bureau, the city has a total area of 4.9 square miles (13 km^{2}), of which 4.9 square miles (13 km^{2}) is land and 0.04 square miles (0.10 km^{2}) (0.40%) is water.

== Media ==
The small weekly newspaper, The Heavener Ledger, dated back to 1904 but ceased publication in 2022. The radio tower for KPRV FM radio sits on top of Poteau Mountain less than a half mile from the Runestone. KPRV broadcasts out of nearby Poteau and has a sister station with the same call letters on the AM band.

== Economy ==
The CPKC railroad operates a major yard, crew base, and fueling facility in Heavener. It and its predecessors have been the town's largest employers for over 70 years. The second largest employer in Heavener is OK Foods. Since 1988 this poultry company has operated a processing plant, a feed mill, and a hatchery.

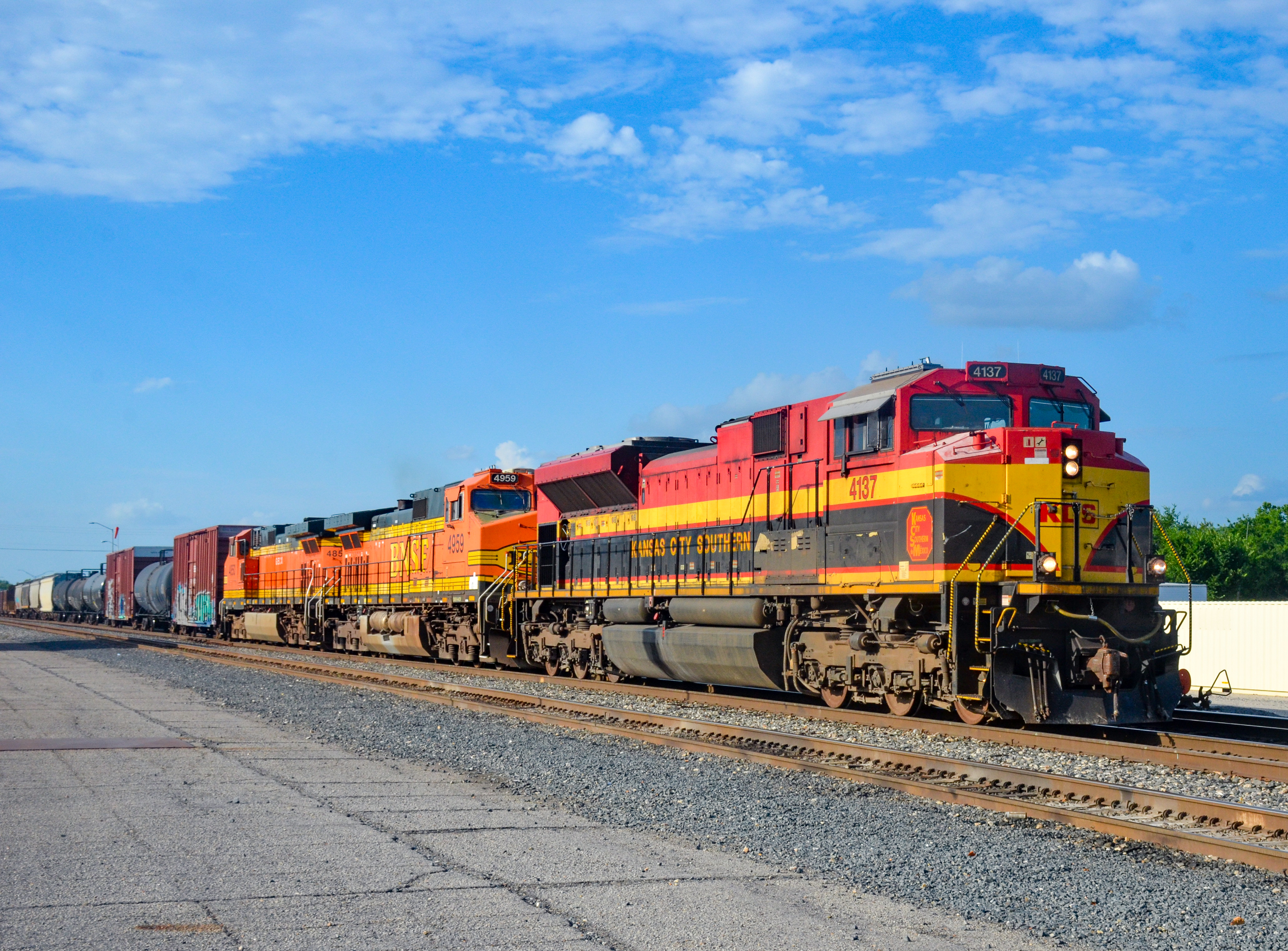
A Kansas City Southern Freight Leaves the Heavener Yard, which is one of the Crew Change Points on CPKC's Heavener Subdivision (June 26, 2021)

== Schools ==
All the schools, the sole educational facilities, are located in the city's center. Heavener High School's mascot is The Wolves. School colors are purple and gold. Main activities at the school include band, choir, football, cheerleading, basketball, baseball, softball, powerlifting, track, golf, soccer, drama, academic team, and jazz band.

== Demographics ==
Historical population
Census	Pop.	Note	%±
1900	234		—
1910	780		233.3%
1920	1,850		137.2%
1930	2,269		22.6%
1940	2,215		−2.4%
1950	2,103		−5.1%
1960	1,891		−10.1%
1970	2,566		35.7%
1980	2,776		8.2%
1990	2,601		−6.3%
2000	3,201		23.1%
2010	3,414		6.7%
2020	2,985		−12.6%
U.S. Decennial Census

=== 2020 census ===
As of the 2020 census, Heavener had a population of 2,985. The median age was 33.6 years. 30.5% of residents were under the age of 18 and 13.5% of residents were 65 years of age or older. For every 100 females there were 103.2 males, and for every 100 females age 18 and over there were 94.3 males age 18 and over.

0% of residents lived in urban areas, while 100.0% lived in rural areas.

There were 1,048 households in Heavener, of which 40.5% had children under the age of 18 living in them. Of all households, 42.7% were married-couple households, 21.8% were households with a male householder and no spouse or partner present, and 27.6% were households with a female householder and no spouse or partner present. About 28.2% of all households were made up of individuals and 11.6% had someone living alone who was 65 years of age or older.

There were 1,260 housing units, of which 16.8% were vacant. Among occupied housing units, 53.1% were owner-occupied and 46.9% were renter-occupied. The homeowner vacancy rate was 4.1% and the rental vacancy rate was 10.4%.

Racial composition as of the 2020 census
Race	Percent
White	49.6%
Black or African American	0.1%
American Indian and Alaska Native	11.7%
Asian	0.3%
Native Hawaiian and Other Pacific Islander	0.2%
Some other race	24.0%
Two or more races	14.0%
Hispanic or Latino (of any race)	36.9%

=== 2000 census ===
As of the 2000 census there were 3,201 people, 1,113 households, and 783 families residing in the city. The population density was 650 inhabitants per square mile (250/km^{2}). There were 1,255 housing units at an average density of 255.0 units per square mile (98.5 units/km^{2}). The racial makeup of the city was 73.79% White, 0.62% African American, 9.84% Native American, 0.16% Asian, 10.56% from other races, and 5.03% from two or more races. Hispanic or Latino of any race were 22.52% of the population.

There were 1,113 households, out of which 34.0% had children under the age of 18 living with them, 51.7% were married couples living together, 12.3% had a female householder with no husband present, and 29.6% were non-families. 25.2% of all households were made up of individuals, and 14.3% had someone living alone who was 65 years of age or older. The average household size was 2.81 and the average family size was 3.27.

In the city, the population was spread out, with 26.3% under the age of 18, 14.9% from 18 to 24, 26.2% from 25 to 44, 17.2% from 45 to 64, and 15.4% who were 65 years of age or older. The median age was 31 years. For every 100 females, there were 100.7 males. For every 100 females age 18 and over, there were 97.0 males.

The median income for a household in the city was $23,750, and the median income for a family was $28,654. Males had a median income of $19,848 versus $18,487 for females. The per capita income for the city was $11,313. About 23.6% of families and 26.3% of the population were below the poverty line, including 32.7% of those under age 18 and 12.5% of those age 65 or over.

The current mayor is Troy Dyer.
