= Vérendrye stone =

The Vérendrye stone was allegedly found on an early expedition into the territory west of the Great Lakes by the French Canadian explorer Pierre Gaultier de Varennes et de La Vérendrye, in the 1730s. It is not mentioned in the official records of La Vérendrye's expeditions, but in 1749 he discussed it with visiting Swedish scientist Pehr Kalm, from whose writings virtually all information about the stone is taken.

== Discovery ==
According to Kalm, Vérendrye's expedition found the tablet on the top of an upright stone (referred to by some as a cairn). Kalm's diary reported it to be about a French foot long, or nearly 13 inches (33 cm) long, and a hand's breadth wide (an early English translation gave this as between four and five inches). On it were said to be inscriptions in unknown characters. The location where it was found is disputed. Hjalmar Holand thought that it was found on an expedition in 1738 to a Mandan area "along the banks of the Missouri" in a location that may have been near present-day Minot, North Dakota. Father Antoine Champagne suggested that Kalm's account, which had the expedition traveling on horseback, could not have been in 1738 as the Mandan had no horses that early. Given that the distance from Montreal was said to be 900 French miles, Champagne suggested a location not far from Pierre, South Dakota. When asked, natives of the area claimed that the tablet and standing stone had always been there together.

== The stone's fate ==
La Vérendrye told Kalm that the tablet was sent back to Quebec, where Jesuit priests concluded that it was written in "Tatarian" writing. They reportedly then sent it to the French Secretary of State, the Comte de Maurepas. There are no descriptions of the stone after that time, but it has been claimed that it was shipped with other artifacts to a church in Rouen, later to be buried under a pile of rubble when the building which housed it was destroyed during World War II. The Minnesota Historical Society has offered a $1,000 reward for the stone's rediscovery.

== Speculated origins ==
Holand has speculated that the inscription was in fact in Norse Runes and is potentially related to the Kensington Runestone, the inscription on which claims it was left in 1362 by an expedition "west from Vinland". Holand argued that resources depicting "Tatarian" writing (such as the Old Hungarian script and its ancestor the Orkhon script) available to the Jesuit priests in Quebec would have shown examples containing a large percentage of characters that are identical to Norse characters. The scripts are of separate origins, but presumably the similar use (engraving in stone) led to similar structure of many characters.

Theodore C. Blegen wrote that "some stones with runelike markings actually carry traces left by small prehistoric creatures", which might mislead anyone who was not a professional runologist.
