= Computus Runicus =

1328 runic calendar

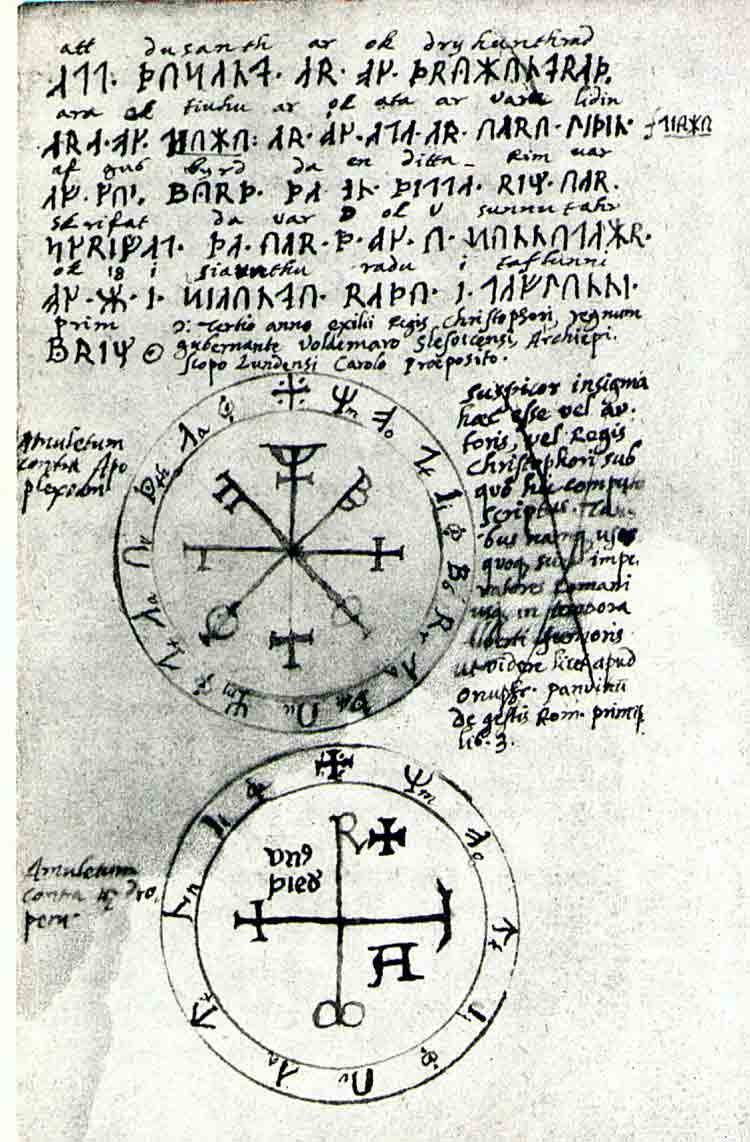
Page 21 of Ole Worm's Computus Runicus.

The Computus Runicus was a runic calendar produced in 1328 and found on the Swedish island of Gotland. A transcription / description of the text – called Computus Runicus – was published in 1626 by Ole Worm (Olaus Wormius) (1588–1654), a Danish physician and antiquarian.

== Description ==
The text consists of the 12 calendar pages and a series of additional pages with detailed explanations for finding information used in the medieval computus, including golden numbers and epacts.

The calendar is written in medieval runes with a gloss in Latin and some places also in Swedish added by Worm. It follows a standard layout for a medieval calendar similar to those found in a book of hours, with Christian feasts and saint's days. Worm attempted to identify some of the unusual symbols found in the calendar, including one marking fast days and another marking the beginning of the zodiacal months, which strangely start on the 18th day of each month instead of the more common 20th or 21st.

As with any medieval calendar, there is a column for the golden numbers used in the Metonic cycle (to find the date of Easter) and another column for the dominical letters (to find the date of Sunday each week). January 31 and the month of February have an additional column to be used for finding the beginning of Lent, while March and April have an additional column to assist with finding the date of Easter. The author used a similar system of rune replacements for the Latin letters and Roman numerals commonly found in other runic calendars, including the use of the extra runes Arlaug, Tvimadur, and Belgthor to represent the golden numbers 17, 18, and 19, which exceed the 16 runes in the younger Futhark.

== See also ==
- computus
- date of Easter
- runic alphabets
- runic calendar
