= Kensington Runestone =

Faked Viking runestone in Minnesota, US

Coordinates: 45°48.788′N 95°40.305′W

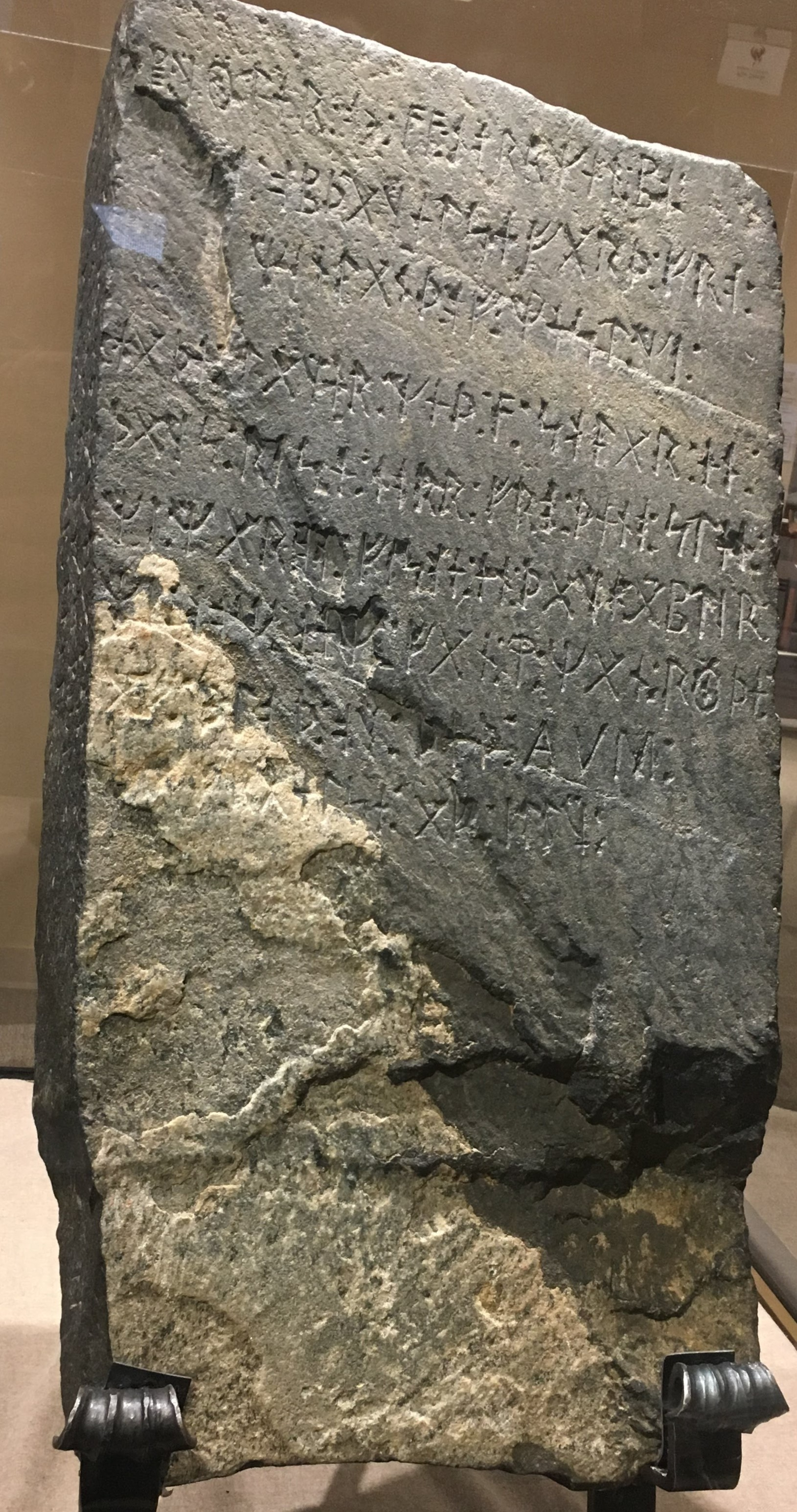
- The stone on display in the Alexandria Chamber of Commerce and Runestone Museum
- Created: 19th century
- Discovered: 1898 CE; Originally Kensington; currently located at Alexandria, Minnesota, United States
- Discovered by: Olof Öhman
- Runemaster: Disputed

Text – Native
- Swedish dialects 8 : göter : ok : 22 : norrmen : po :...o : opþagelsefärd : fro : vinland : of : vest : vi : hade : läger : ved : 2 : skLär : en : dags : rise : norr : fro : þeno : sten : vi : var : ok : fiske : en : dagh : äptir : vi : kom : hem : fan : 10 : man : röde : af : blod : og : ded : AVM : frälse : äf : illü. här : (10) : mans : ve : havet : at : se : äptir : vore : skip : 14 : dagh : rise : from : þeno : öh : ahr : 1362

Translation
- (word-for-word): Eight Götalanders and 22 Northmen on (this?) exploration journey from Vinland far to the west. We had a camp by two (shelters?) one day's journey north from this stone. We were fishing one day. After we came home, found 10 men red from blood and dead. Ave Maria save from evil. (side of stone) There are 10 men by the inland sea to look after our ships fourteen days journey from this peninsula (or island). Year 1362

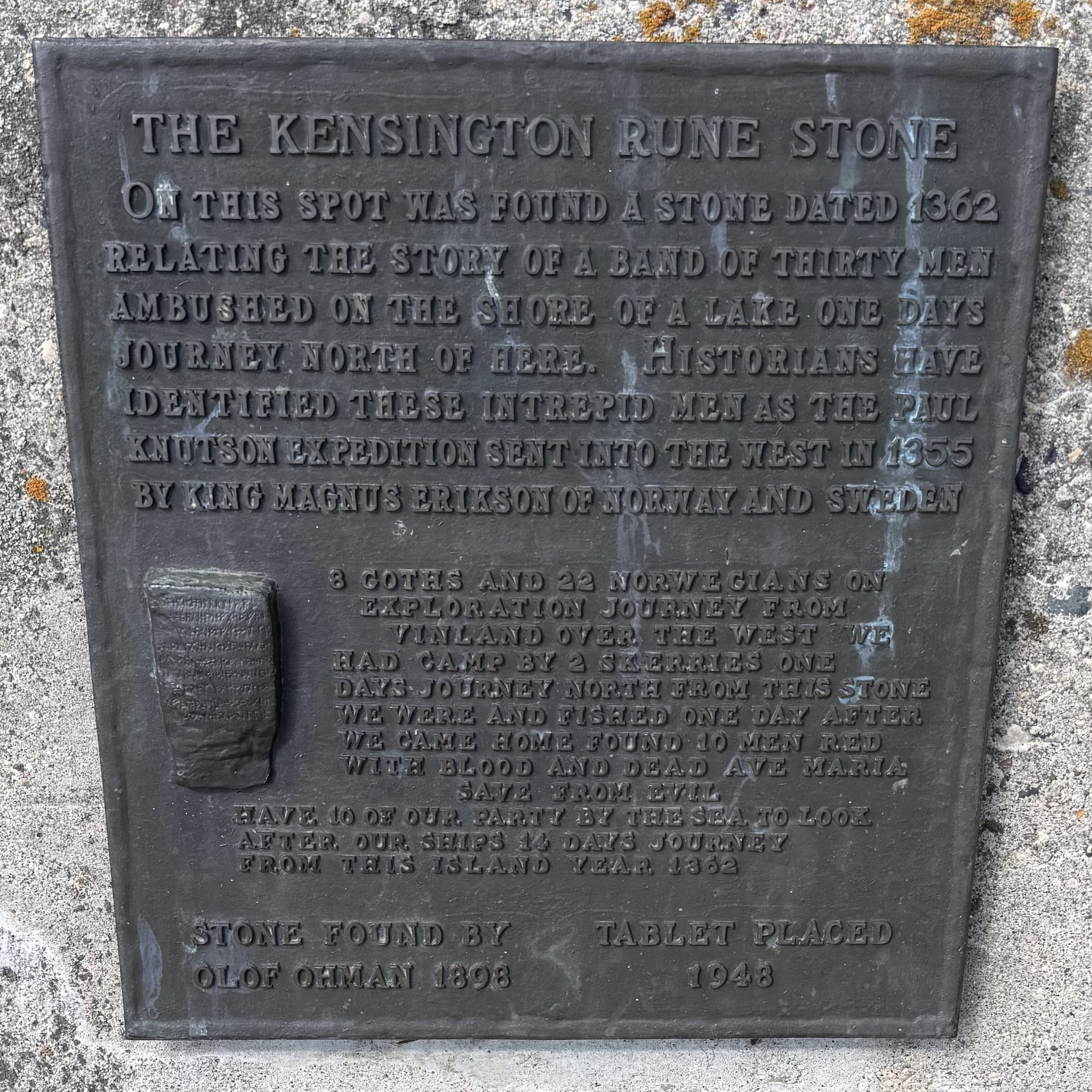
1948 marker where the stone was said to have been found.

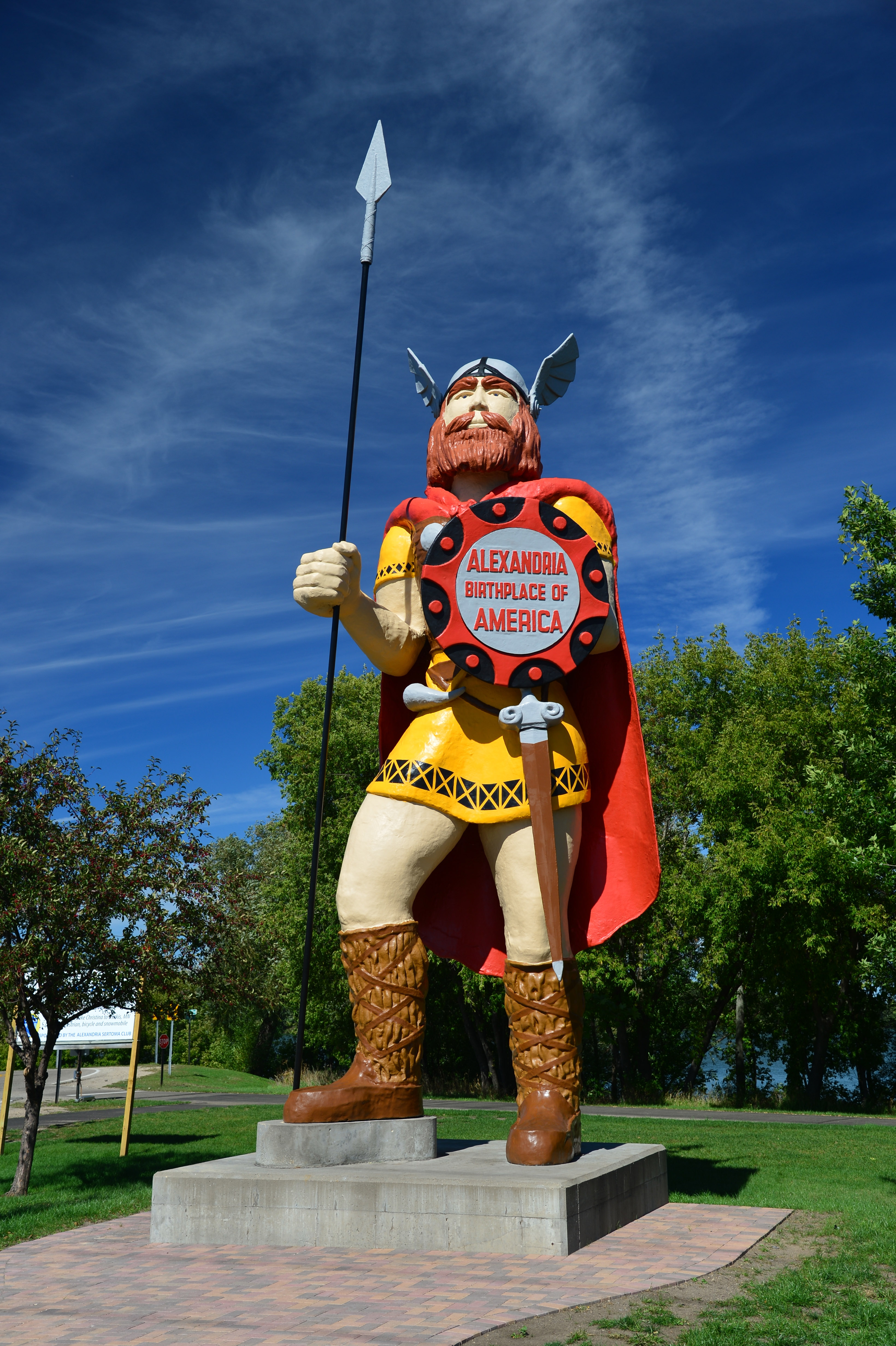
Statue of "Big Ole the Viking" in Alexandria, Minnesota, proclaiming the city the "Birthplace of America," based on an assumed authenticity of the Kensington Stone

The Kensington Runestone is a slab of greywacke stone covered in runes that was discovered in Western Minnesota, United States, in 1898. Olof Ohman, a Swedish immigrant, reported that he unearthed it from a field in the largely rural township of Solem in Douglas County. It was later named after the nearest settlement, Kensington.

The inscription purports to be a record left behind by Scandinavian explorers in the 14th century (internally dated to 1362). There has been a drawn-out debate regarding the stone's authenticity, but since the first scientific examination in 1910, the scholarly consensus has classified it as a 19th-century hoax, with some critics directly charging Ohman with fabrication. Nevertheless, there remains a community fueled by "natural scientists with no knowledge of linguistics" convinced of the stone's authenticity.

== Provenance ==
A Swedish immigrant, Olof Ohman, said that he found the stone late in 1898 while clearing his recently acquired land of trees and stumps before plowing. The stone was said to be near the crest of a small knoll rising above the wetlands, lying face down and tangled in the root system of a stunted poplar tree estimated to be from less than 10 to about 40 years old. The artifact is about 30 × 16 × 6 inches (76 × 41 × 15 cm) in size and weighs 202 pounds (92 kg). Ohman's 10-year-old son Edward noticed some markings, and the farmer later said that he thought they had found an "Indian almanac".

During this period, the journey of Leif Ericson to Vinland (North America) was being widely discussed and there was renewed interest in the Vikings throughout Scandinavia, stirred by the National Romanticism movement. Five years earlier, Norway had participated in the World's Columbian Exposition by sending the Viking, a replica of the Gokstad ship, to Chicago. There was also friction between Sweden and Norway (which ultimately led to Norway's independence from Sweden in 1905). Some Norwegians claimed that the stone was a Swedish hoax, and there were similar Swedish accusations because the stone references a joint expedition of Norwegians and Swedes. It is thought to be more than coincidental that the stone was found among Scandinavian newcomers in Minnesota, still struggling for acceptance and quite proud of their Nordic heritage. A copy of the inscription made its way to the University of Minnesota. Olaus J. Breda (1853–1916), professor of Scandinavian Languages and Literature in the Scandinavian Department, declared the stone to be a forgery and published a discrediting article which appeared in Symra in 1910. Breda also forwarded copies of the inscription to fellow linguists and historians in Scandinavia, such as Oluf Rygh, Sophus Bugge, Gustav Storm, Magnus Olsen and Adolf Noreen. They "unanimously pronounced the Kensington inscription a fraud and forgery of recent date".

The stone was then sent to Northwestern University in Evanston, Illinois. Scholars either dismissed it as a prank or felt unable to identify a sustainable historical context, and the stone was returned to Ohman. Hjalmar Holand, a Norwegian-American historian and author, claimed Ohman gave him the stone. However, the Minnesota Historical Society has a bill of sale showing Ohman sold them the stone for $10 in 1911. Holand renewed public interest with an article enthusiastically summarizing studies that were made by geologist Newton Horace Winchell (Minnesota Historical Society) and linguist George T. Flom (Philological Society of the University of Illinois), who both published opinions in 1910.

According to Winchell, the tree under which the stone was found had been destroyed before 1910. Several nearby poplars that witnesses estimated as being about the same size were cut down and, by counting their rings, it was determined they were around 30 to 40 years old. One member of the team who had excavated at the find site in 1899, county school superintendent Cleve Van Dyke, later recalled the trees being only 10 or 12 years old. The surrounding county had not been settled until 1858, and settlement was severely restricted for a time by the Dakota War of 1862 (although it was reported that, by 1867, the best land in the township adjacent to Solem, Holmes City, was already taken by a mixture of Swedish, Norwegian and "Yankee" settlers).

Winchell estimated that the inscription was roughly 500 years old, by comparing its weathering with the weathering on the backside, which he assumed was glacial and 8,000 years old. He also stated that the chisel marks were fresh. More recently geologist Harold Edwards has also noted that "The inscription is about as sharp as the day it was carved ... The letters are smooth showing virtually no weathering." Winchell also mentions in the same report that Prof. William O. Hotchkiss, the state geologist of Wisconsin, estimated that the runes were at least 50 to 100 years old. Meanwhile, Flom found a strong apparent divergence between the runes used in the Kensington inscription and those in use during the 14th century. Similarly, the language of the inscription was modern compared to the Nordic languages of the 14th century.

The Kensington Runestone is on display at the Runestone Museum in Alexandria, Minnesota.

== Text and translation ==
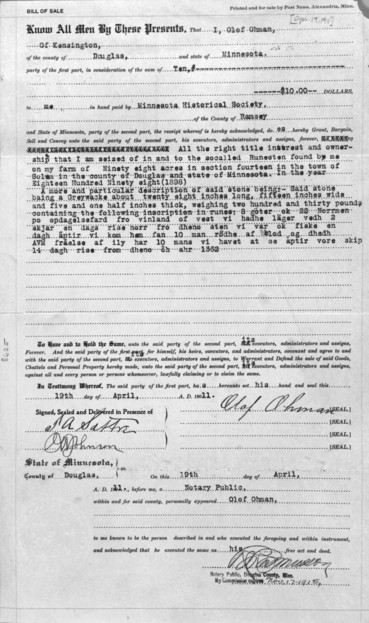
1911 bill of sale for the stone from Ohman to the Minnesota Historical Society

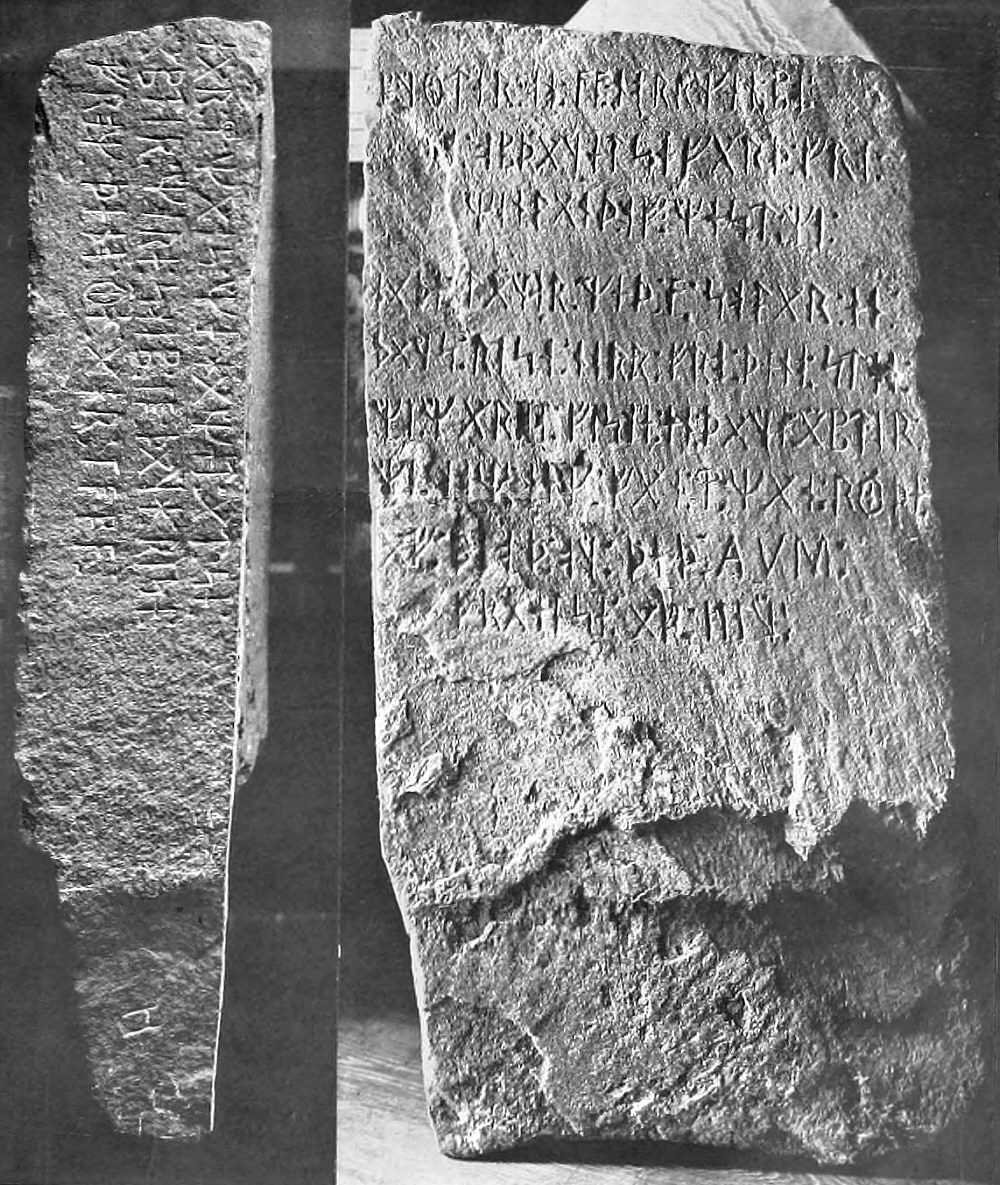
The stone in 1910

The text consists of nine lines on the face of the stone, and three lines on the edge, read as follows:

Front:

8 : göter : ok : 22 : norrmen : po :
...o : opdagelsefärd : fro :
vinland : of : vest : vi :
hade : läger : ved : 2 : skjär : en :
dags : rise : norr : fro : deno : sten :
vi : var : ok : fiske : en : dagh : äptir :
vi : kom : hem : fan : 10 : man : röde :
af : blod : og : ded : AVM :
frälse : äf : illü.

Side:

här : (10) : mans : ve : havet : at : se :
äptir : vore : skip : 14 : dagh : rise :
from : deno : öh : ahr : 1362 :

The sequences rr, ll and gh represent actual digraphs. The AVM is written in Latin capitals. The numbers given in Arabic numerals in the above transcription are given in pentadic numerals. At least seven of the runes, including those transcribed a, d, v, j, ä, ö above, are not in any standard known from the medieval period (see below for details). The language of the inscription is close to modern Swedish, the transliterated text being quite easily comprehensible to any speaker of a modern Scandinavian language. The language, being closer to the Swedish of the 19th than of the 14th century, is one of the main reasons for the scholarly consensus dismissing it as a hoax.

The text translates to:

"Eight Geats and twenty-two Norwegians on an exploration journey from Vinland to the west. We had camp by two skerries one day's journey north from this stone. We were [out] to fish one day. After we came home [we] found ten men red of blood and dead. AVM (Ave Virgo Maria) save [us] from evil."

"[We] have ten men by the sea to look after our ships, fourteen days' travel from this island. [In the] year 1362."

== Linguistic analysis ==
Holand took the stone to Europe and, while newspapers in Minnesota carried articles hotly debating its authenticity, the stone was quickly dismissed by Swedish linguists.

For the next 40 years, Holand struggled to sway public and scholarly opinion about the Runestone, writing articles and several books. He achieved brief success in 1949, when the stone was put on display at the Smithsonian Institution, and scholars such as William Thalbitzer and S. N. Hagen published papers supporting its authenticity. At nearly the same time, Scandinavian linguists Sven Jansson, Erik Moltke, Harry Andersen and K. M. Nielsen, along with a popular book by Erik Wahlgren, again questioned the Runestone's authenticity.

Along with Wahlgren, historian Theodore C. Blegen flatly asserted that Ohman had carved the artifact as a prank, possibly with help from others in the Kensington area. Further resolution seemed to come with the 1976 published transcript of an interview of Frank Walter Gran, conducted by Paul Carson, Jr. on August 13, 1967, that had been recorded on audio tape. In it, Gran said that his father John confessed in 1927 that Ohman made the inscription. John Gran's story, however, was based on second-hand anecdotes that he had heard about Ohman, and, although it was presented as a dying declaration, Gran lived for several more years, saying nothing more about the stone.

The possibility that the Runestone was an authentic 14th-century artifact was raised again, in 1982, by Robert Hall, an emeritus professor of the Italian language and Italian literature at Cornell University, who published a book (and a follow-up in 1994) questioning the methods of its critics. Hall asserted that the odd philological problems in the Runestone could be the result of normal dialectal variances in Old Swedish of the period. He contended that critics had not considered the physical evidence, which he found leaned heavily toward authenticity. Hall was not a runologist; his errors in reading the runes have been described by two runologists, James E. Knirk and R. I. Page.

In The Vikings and America (1986), Wahlgren again stated that the text bore linguistic abnormalities and spellings that he thought suggested that the Runestone was a forgery.

=== Lexical evidence ===
One of the main linguistic arguments for the rejection of the text as genuine Old Swedish is the term opthagelse farth (updagelsefard) 'journey of discovery'. This lexeme is unattested in either Scandinavian, Low Franconian or Low German before the 16th century. Similar terms exist in modern Scandinavian (Norwegian oppdagingsferd or oppdagelsesferd, Swedish upptäcktsfärd). Opdage is a loan from Low German *updagen, Dutch opdagen, which is in turn from High German aufdecken, ultimately loan-translated from French découvrir 'to discover' in the 16th century. The Norwegian historian Gustav Storm often used the modern Norwegian lexeme in late 19th-century articles on Viking exploration, creating a plausible incentive for the manufacturer of the inscription to use this word.

=== Grammatical evidence ===
Another characteristic pointed out by skeptics is the text's lack of cases. Early Old Swedish (14th century) still retained the four cases of Old Norse, but Late Old Swedish (15th century) reduced its case structure to two cases, so that the absence of inflection in a Swedish text of the 14th century would be an irregularity. Similarly, the inscription text does not use the plural verb forms that were common in the 14th century and have only recently disappeared: for example, (plural forms in parentheses) wi war (warum), hathe (hafðe), [wi] fiske (fiskaðum), kom (komum), fann (funnum) and wi hathe (hafðum).

Proponents of the stone's authenticity pointed to sporadic examples of these simpler forms in some 14th-century texts and to the great changes of the morphological system of the Scandinavian languages that began during the latter part of that century.

=== Paleographic evidence ===
The inscription contains pentadic numerals. Such numerals are known in Scandinavia, but nearly always from relatively recent times, not from verified medieval runic monuments, on which numbers were usually spelled out as words.

S. N. Hagen stated "The Kensington alphabet is a synthesis of older unsimplified runes, later dotted runes, and a number of Latin letters ... The runes for a, n, s and t are the old Danish unsimplified forms which should have been out of use for a long time [by the 14th century] ... I suggest that [a posited 14th century] creator must at some time or other in his life have been familiar with an inscription (or inscriptions) composed at a time when these unsimplified forms were still in use" and that he "was not a professional runic scribe before he left his homeland".

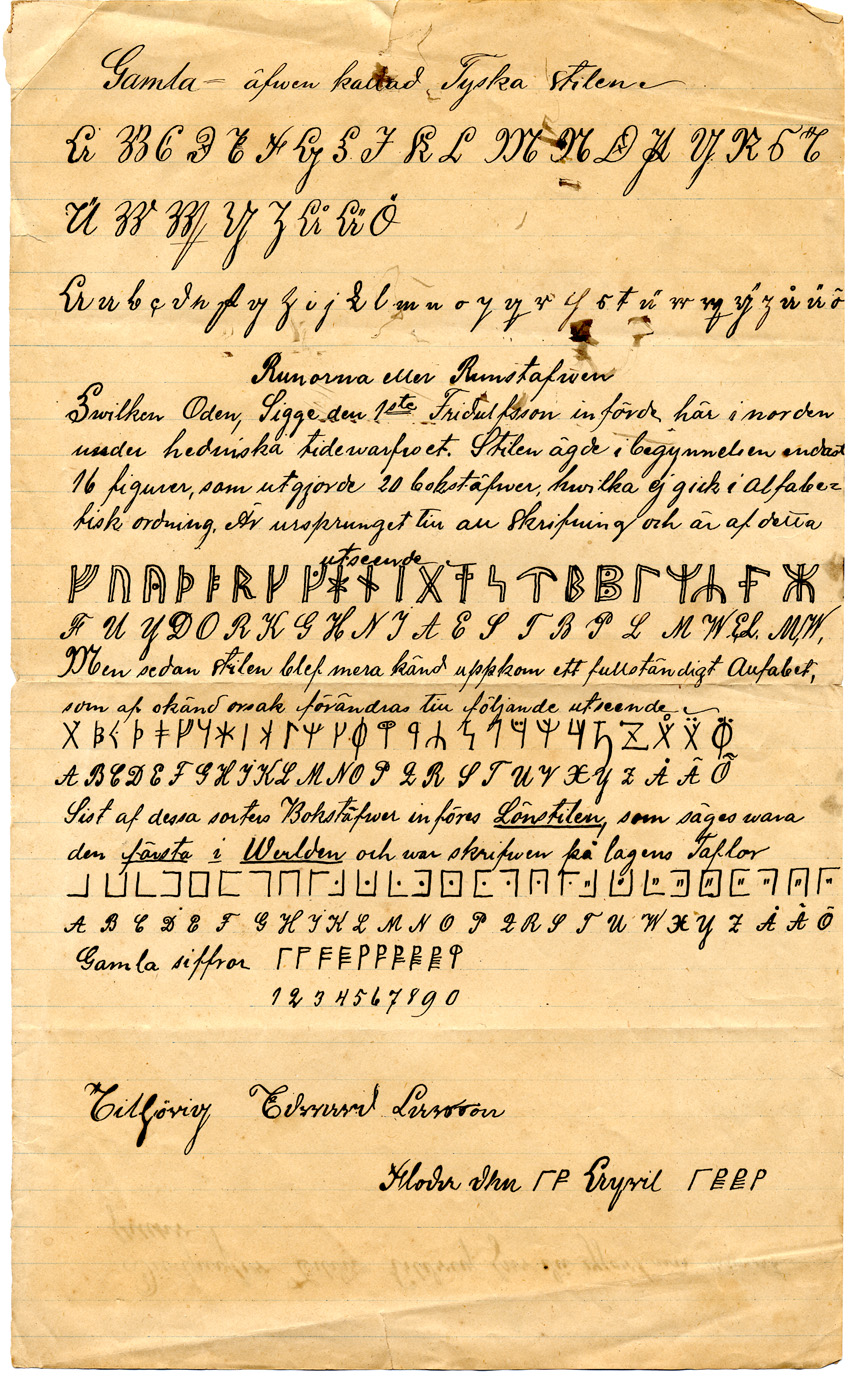
Edward Larsson's notes (1885)

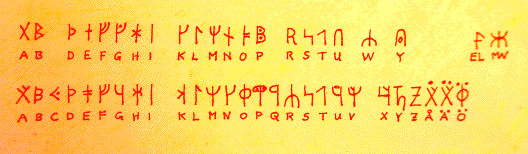
Edward Larsson's runic alphabets from 1885

A possible origin for the irregular shape of the runes was discovered in 2004, in the 1883 notes of a then-16-year-old journeyman tailor with an interest in folk music, Edward Larsson. Larsson's aunt had migrated with her husband and son from Sweden to Crooked Lake, just outside Alexandria, Minnesota in 1870. Larsson's sheet lists two different Futharks. The first Futhark consists of 22 runes, the last two of which are bind-runes, representing the letter-combinations EL and MW. His second Futhark consists of 27 runes, where the last three are specially adapted to represent the letters å, ä, and ö of the modern Swedish alphabet. The runes in this second set correspond closely to the non-standard runes in the Kensington inscription.

Another possible origin was discovered in 2019, when two short inscriptions with runes closely resembling the ones on the Kensington stone, dated 1870 and 1877 respectively, were discovered in a farm-hand's room in the village Kölsjön in the parish of Hassela, not too far from Olof Öhman's home parish Forsa. In 2020, Swedish archaeologist Mats G. Larsson discovered that Anna Ersson, cousin and childhood friend of Olof Öhman, lived in Kölsjön during 1878. Their relationship seems to have been close, as Öhman asked Ersson to marry him in 1879. More runic inscriptions were later discovered in the area around Kölsjön, and Larsson furthermore established that Öhman had relatives who owned land in Kölsjön, further increasing the proximity between Öhman and the runic inscriptions of 1870s Sweden.

The abbreviation for Ave Maria consists of the Latin letters AVM. Wahlgren (1958) noted that the carver had incised a notch on the upper right-hand corner of the letter V. The Massey Twins in their 2004 paper argued that this notch is consistent with a scribal abbreviation for a final -e used in the 14th century.

== Purported historical context ==
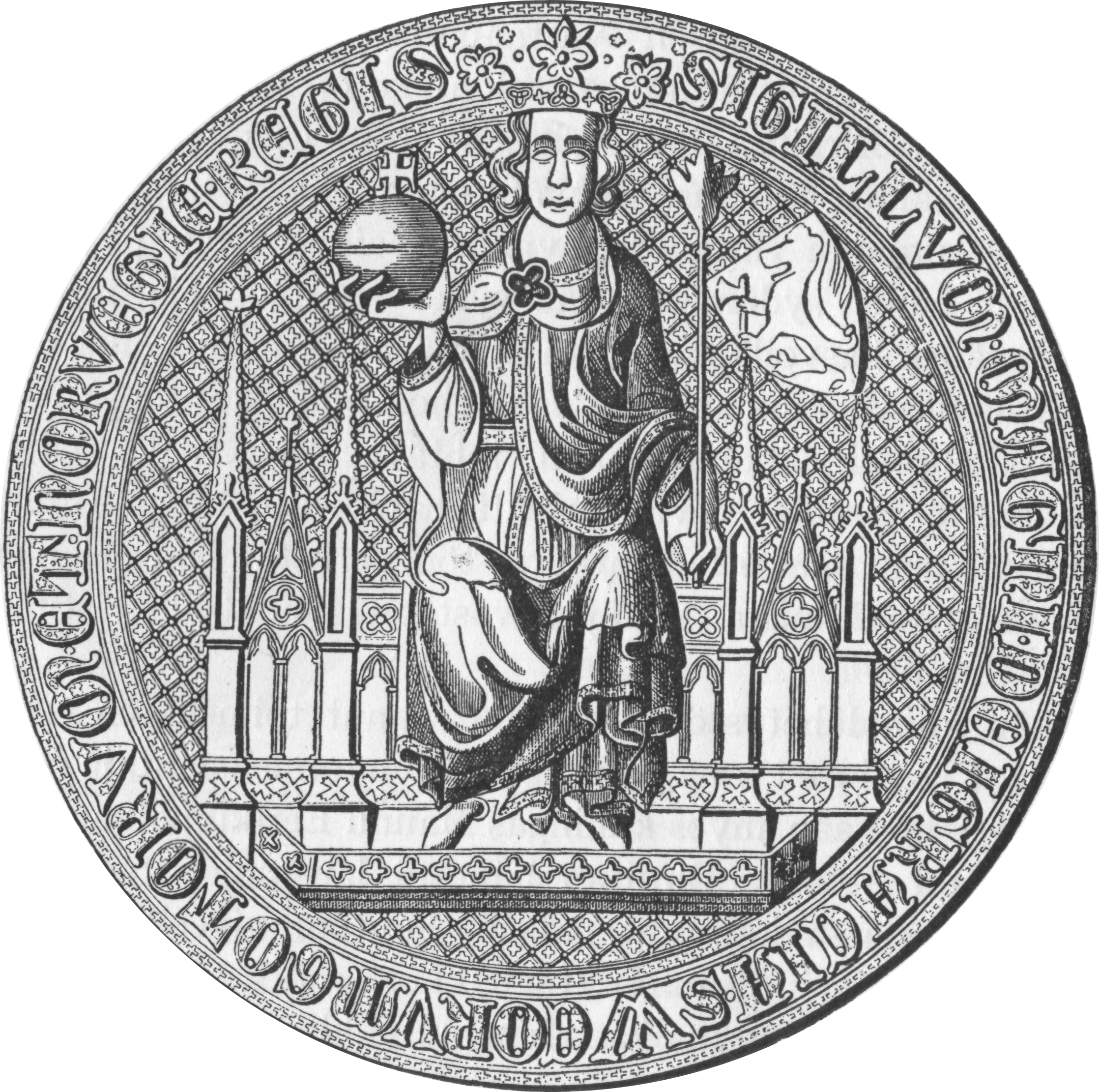
Sigillum ad causas for Magnus Eriksson, King of Norway and Sweden

Norse colonies are known to have existed in Greenland from the late 10th century to the 15th century, and at least one short-lived settlement was established in Newfoundland, at L'Anse aux Meadows, in the 11th century, but no other widely accepted material evidence of Norse contact with the Americas in the pre-Columbian era has yet emerged.

In a letter by Gerardus Mercator to John Dee, dated 1577, Mercator refers to a Jacob Cnoyen, who had learned that eight men returned to Norway from an expedition to the Arctic islands in 1364. One of the men, a priest, provided the king of Norway with a great deal of geographical information.

Furthermore, in 1354, King Magnus Eriksson of Sweden and Norway issued a letter appointing a law officer named Paul Knutsson as leader of an expedition to the colony of Greenland, in order to investigate reports that the population was turning away from Christian culture. Another of the documents reprinted by the 19th-century scholars was a scholarly attempt by Icelandic Bishop Gisli Oddsson, in 1637, to compile a history of the Arctic colonies. He dated the Greenlanders' fall away from Christianity to 1342 and claimed that they had turned instead to America. Supporters of a 14th-century origin for the Kensington Runestone argue that Knutson may, therefore, have travelled beyond Greenland to North America in search of renegade Greenlanders, whereupon most of his expedition was killed in Minnesota, leaving just the eight voyagers to return to Norway.

However, there is no evidence that the Knutson expedition ever set sail (the government of Norway went through considerable turmoil in 1355) and the information from Cnoyen as relayed by Mercator states specifically that the eight men who came to Norway in 1364 were not survivors of a recent expedition, but descended from the colonists who had settled the distant lands several generations earlier. Those early 19th-century books, which aroused a great deal of interest among Scandinavian Americans, would have been available to a late 19th-century hoaxer.

Hjalmar Holand adduced the "blond" Indians among the Mandan on the Upper Missouri River as possible descendants of the Swedish and Norwegian explorers. This was dismissed as "tangential" to the Runestone issue by Alice Beck Kehoe in her 2004 book The Kensington Runestone, Approaching a Research Question Holistically.

== In popular culture ==
Peter Stormare delved into the history and mystery of the Kensington Runestone in the 2021 Science Channel series Secrets of the Viking Stone.

In May 2022, the St. Paul–based History Theatre premiered Runestone! A Rock Musical. The show, written by Mark Jensen and composed by Gary Rue, explores the impact of the runestone on Öhman and his family, but leaves the veracity of the carving up to the audience to judge.

== See also ==
- AVM Runestone, a hoax planted near the site of the Kensington runestone
- Elbow Lake Runestone, a hoax planted in Minnesota
- Beardmore Relics, Viking Age relics, supposedly found in Canada, associated with the Kensington runestone
- Vérendrye Runestone, allegedly found west of the Great Lakes in the 1730s
- Heavener Runestone, a runestone found in Oklahoma
- Narragansett Runestone, marked stone visible during low tide in Rhode Island
- Spirit Pond runestones, several small runestones found in Maine
- Maine penny, a Norse coin that was found in Maine

== Literature ==
- Thalbitzer, William C. (1951). Two runic stones, from Greenland and Minnesota. Washington: Smithsonian Institution. OCLC 2585531.
- Hall, Robert A. Jr. (1982). The Kensington Rune-stone is Genuine: Linguistic, practical, methodological considerations. Columbia, SC: Hornbeam Press. ISBN 0-917496-21-3.
- Kehoe, Alice Beck (2005). The Kensington Runestone: Approaching a Research Question Holistically. Waveland Press. ISBN 1-57766-371-3.
- "Kensingtonstenens gåta – The riddle of the Kensington runestone" (PDF). Historiska Nyheter (in Swedish and English) (Specialnummer om Kensingtonstenen). Stockholm: Statens historiska museum: 16 pages. 2003. ISSN 0280-4115. Archived from the original (PDF) on June 17, 2009.
- Anderson, Rasmus B (1920). "Another View of the Kensington Rune Stone". Wisconsin Magazine of History. 3: 1–9.
- Flom, George T (1910). "The Kensington Rune-Stone: A modern inscription from Douglas County, Minnesota". Publications of the Illinois State Historical Library. 15. Illinois State Historical Society: 3–44.
