= Kensington, Minnesota =

City in Minnesota, United States

Kensington
- City
- Location of Kensington, Minnesota
- Coordinates: 45°46′40″N 95°41′44″W
- Country: United States
- State: Minnesota
- County: Douglas
- Founded: 1887
- Incorporated: 1891

Government

Area
  - Total: 0.36 sq mi (0.93 km^{2})
  - Land: 0.36 sq mi (0.93 km^{2})
  - Water: 0 sq mi (0.00 km^{2})
- Elevation: 1,309 ft (399 m)

Population (2020)
  - Total: 266
  - Estimate (2021): 272
  - Density: 743.7/sq mi (287.13/km^{2})
- Time zone: UTC-6 (CST)
  - Summer (DST): UTC-5 (CDT)
- ZIP code: 56343
- Area code: 320
- FIPS code: 27-32768
- GNIS feature ID: 2395510
- Website: kensingtonmn.com

Kensington is a city in Douglas County, Minnesota, United States. The population was 266 at the 2020 census. The city is notable in Minnesota history for being the place where the Kensington Runestone was first displayed. It is now at a museum in nearby Alexandria, Minnesota.

== History ==
Kensington was platted in 1887, and named after Kensington, in London. A post office has been in operation in Kensington since 1887. Kensington was incorporated in 1891.

== Geography ==
According to the United States Census Bureau, the city has an area of 0.36 square miles (0.93 km^{2}), all land.

Minnesota State Highway 55 serves as a main route in the community.

== Demographics ==
Historical population
Census	Pop.	Note	%±
1900	207		—
1910	244		17.9%
1920	252		3.3%
1930	283		12.3%
1940	337		19.1%
1950	354		5.0%
1960	324		−8.5%
1970	308		−4.9%
1980	331		7.5%
1990	295		−10.9%
2000	286		−3.1%
2010	292		2.1%
2020	266		−8.9%
2021 (est.)	272		2.3%
U.S. Decennial Census; 2020 Census

=== 2010 census ===
As of the census of 2010, there were 292 people, 137 households, and 75 families residing in the city. The population density was 811.1 inhabitants per square mile (313.2/km^{2}). There were 147 housing units at an average density of 408.3 per square mile (157.6/km^{2}). The racial makeup of the city was 96.9% White, 0.3% African American, 1.0% Native American, 0.3% from other races, and 1.4% from two or more races. Hispanic or Latino of any race were 2.7% of the population.

There were 137 households, of which 23.4% had children under the age of 18 living with them, 44.5% were married couples living together, 8.8% had a female householder with no husband present, 1.5% had a male householder with no wife present, and 45.3% were non-families. 40.9% of all households were made up of individuals, and 17.5% had someone living alone who was 65 years of age or older. The average household size was 2.13 and the average family size was 2.89.

The median age in the city was 40.3 years. 20.2% of residents were under the age of 18; 8.4% were between the ages of 18 and 24; 26.7% were from 25 to 44; 27.1% were from 45 to 64; and 17.5% were 65 years of age or older. The gender makeup of the city was 50.3% male and 49.7% female.

=== 2000 census ===
As of the census of 2000, there were 286 people, 132 households, and 67 families residing in the city. The population density was 1,093.9 inhabitants per square mile (422.4/km^{2}). There were 148 housing units at an average density of 566.1 per square mile (218.6/km^{2}). The racial makeup of the city was 97.55% White, 0.35% African American, 0.35% Native American, and 1.75% from two or more races. 35.4% were of German, 30.0% Norwegian, 8.7% Swedish and 5.3% Irish ancestry according to Census 2000.

There were 132 households, out of which 28.8% had children under the age of 18 living with them, 39.4% were married couples living together, 8.3% had a female householder with no husband present, and 49.2% were non-families. 40.9% of all households were made up of individuals, and 22.7% had someone living alone who was 65 years of age or older. The average household size was 2.17 and the average family size was 3.03.

In the city, the population was spread out, with 24.8% under the age of 18, 10.8% from 18 to 24, 26.2% from 25 to 44, 18.2% from 45 to 64, and 19.9% who were 65 years of age or older. The median age was 37 years. For every 100 females, there were 95.9 males. For every 100 females age 18 and over, there were 93.7 males.

The median income for a household in the city was $31,979, and the median income for a family was $39,750. Males had a median income of $26,250 versus $22,500 for females. The per capita income for the city was $14,932. About 5.1% of families and 14.8% of the population were below the poverty line, including 12.7% of those under the age of eighteen and 22.2% of those 65 or over.
