= New England Antiquities Research Association =

NEARA logo

The New England Antiquities Research Association (NEARA) is a non-profit organization founded 1964. According to its website, it "is dedicated to a better understanding of our historic and prehistoric past through the study and preservation of New England's stone sites in their cultural context."

== Criticism ==
The membership of NEARA consists for the most part of amateurs, and the organization was in 2003 described as a 'hotbed of "Diffusionist" thought, the belief that the Americas were widely visited by European and Asiatic cultures before Columbus'.

Writing about NEARA's interest in lithic sites, archaeologist Kenneth Feder has said that "For many in NEARA, these lithic sites represent a wealth of remarkable evidence of the ancient occupation of New England by ancient Celts and other western Europeans long before the arrival of the Pilgrims in Massachusetts or even Christopher Columbus in the Caribbean. Orthodox archaeology and history reject this claim, ascribing most of the lithic sites to more recent migrants to New England, namely, seventeenth-, eighteenth-, and nineteenth-century settlers and farmers. Archaeological skepticism about claims of much earlier dates for the chambers is based on the complete lack of any artifactual evidence found in any of the chambers that would allow us to confidently trace these features to an earlier time period."

== Publications ==
The association has published New England Antiquities Research Association Journal, formerly known as New England Antiquities Research Association Newsletter, since 1964. The Journal is published twice a year, as of 2016. It was formerly published quarterly. According to Ulrich as of 1997 the number of associated disciplines it discusses was growing. It also published Across Before Columbus? Evidence for Transoceanic Contact with the Americas prior to 1492 in 1998, ISBN 0-9663038-0-6.
