= Hjalmar Holand =

American historian (1872–1963)

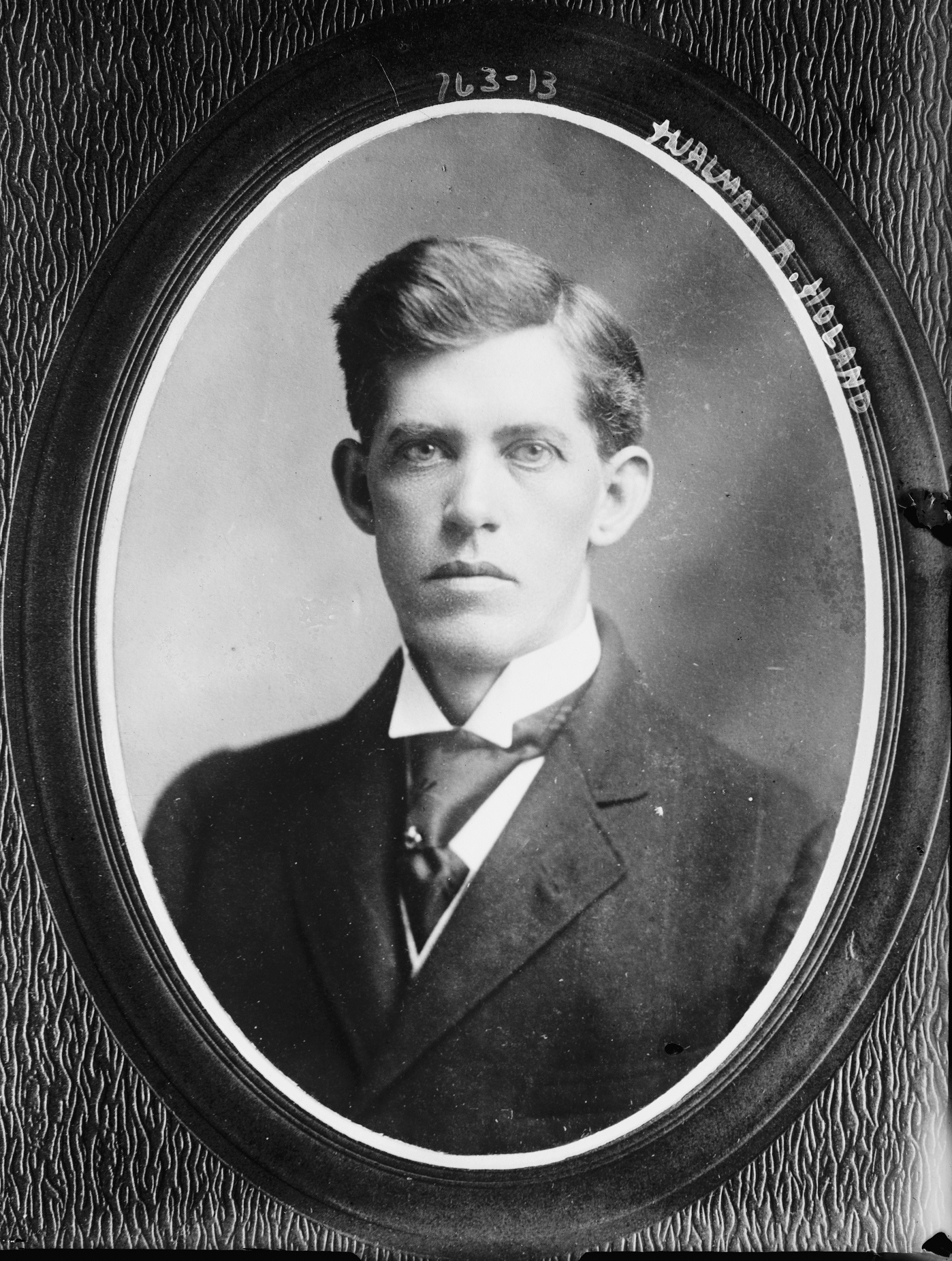
- Born: October 20, 1872; Høland, Akershus, Norway
- Died: August 6, 1963
- Genre: History
- Notable works: Norwegians in America

Hjalmar Rued Holand (October 20, 1872 – August 6, 1963) was a Norwegian-American historian and author. He was the author of a number of books and articles principally dealing with the history of Door County, Wisconsin, of the Upper Midwest, and with Norwegian-American immigration.

== Background ==
Hjalmar Rued Holand was born in Høland, Akershus, Norway. Holand, at age 13, along with his older sister, Helene, immigrated to America to stay with an older brother and his wife, living in Chicago. Unhappy with the living arrangements, Holand left Chicago to stay with another sister, Annette Johnson, living in Wautoma, Wisconsin. He received his BA from the University of Wisconsin in 1898, earning his MA the following year. Holand was awarded a Guggenheim Fellowship in anthropology and cultural studies during 1950.

== Career ==
Holand lived most of his life on a farm near Ephraim, Wisconsin. He was an early advocate of the now widely recognized realization that Vikings visited the New World in voyages that pre-dated Christopher Columbus. Holand also made an effort to confirm the authenticity of the Kensington Stone together with other rune stones and Viking relics found throughout North America. Holland also wrote a two volume history of Door County, Wisconsin, which was published in 1917 and founded and was the long-time president of the Door County Historical Society.

The scholarly consensus has classified the Kensington Runestone as a 19th-century hoax, with some critics directly charging its discoverer with fabrication.

Holand is most frequently associated with his two volume history of Norwegian-American immigration. Holand spent many years collecting the stories as he traveled to various Norwegian-American settlements in the Upper Midwest. The results were De Norske Settlements Historie released in 1908 and Den Siste Folkevandring Sagastubber Fra Nybyggerlivet I Amerika published in 1930. Both were written and published in Norwegian. These works have subsequently been translated and published in English. The first was a partial translation released in 1978, and the second was a complete translation released in 2006.

== Selected bibliography ==
- De Norske Settlements Historie (1908) - (published in English as Norwegians in America in 1978)
- Nils Otto Tank (1909)
- History of Door County, Wisconsin (1917)
- Old Peninsula Days (1925)
- Coon Prairie (1927)
- Coon Valley (1928)
- Den Siste Folkevandring Sagastubber Fra Nybyggerlivet I Amerika (1930) – (published in English under the title History of the Norwegian Settlements in 2006)
- Wisconsin’s Belgium Community (1931)
- The Kensington Stone (Ephraim, WI: Privately published, 1932)
- Westward from Vinland (1940) - (republished under the title Norse Discoveries and Explorations in North America, 982-1362 in 1969)
- America 1355-1364 (1946)
- Explorations in America before Columbus (1956)
- My First Eighty Years (1957)
- A Pre-Columbian Crusade to America (1962)

== See also ==
- Viking revival
- Norway Lutheran Church
- Simon Kahquados (1851 – 1930), Potawatomi leader and historical source for Holand

== Other sources ==
- Burton, Paul and Frances Ephraim Stories (Ephraim: Stonehill Publishing, published in 1999. reprinted in 2003)
- "H. Holand, Noted Author and Historian, Dead at 90". Door County Advocate. August 8, 1963, pp. 1 and 3)
