= Bødtker =

Bødtker is a surname. Notable people with the surname include:

- Carl Bødtker (1886–1980), Norwegian engineer and radio personality
- Carl Fredrik Johannes Bødtker (1851–1928), Norwegian military officer, teacher, and writer
- Erik Bødtker Øyno (born 1965), Norwegian businessperson and chief executive officer of Aktiv Kapital
- Eyvind Bødtker (1867–1932), Norwegian chemist
- Henning Bødtker (1891–1975), Norwegian jurist and civil servant
- Job Dischington Bødtker (1818–1889), Norwegian jurist and politician
- Johannes Sejersted Bødtker CBE (1879–1963), Norwegian banker, art collector and patron of the arts
- Ragnvald Bødtker (1859–1946), Norwegian engineer, known as the director of log driving in Halden for 42 years
- Sigurd Bødtker (1866–1928), Norwegian theatre critic
