= Jevne =

Jevne may refer to:

- Jevne (surname)
- H. Jevne & Co., an early grocery store in California, United States
- Jevne State Park, a state park in northern Minnesota, United States
- Jevne Township, Aitkin County, Minnesota, United States
