= Kristian Bakken =

Norwegian labourer and politician (1888–1954)

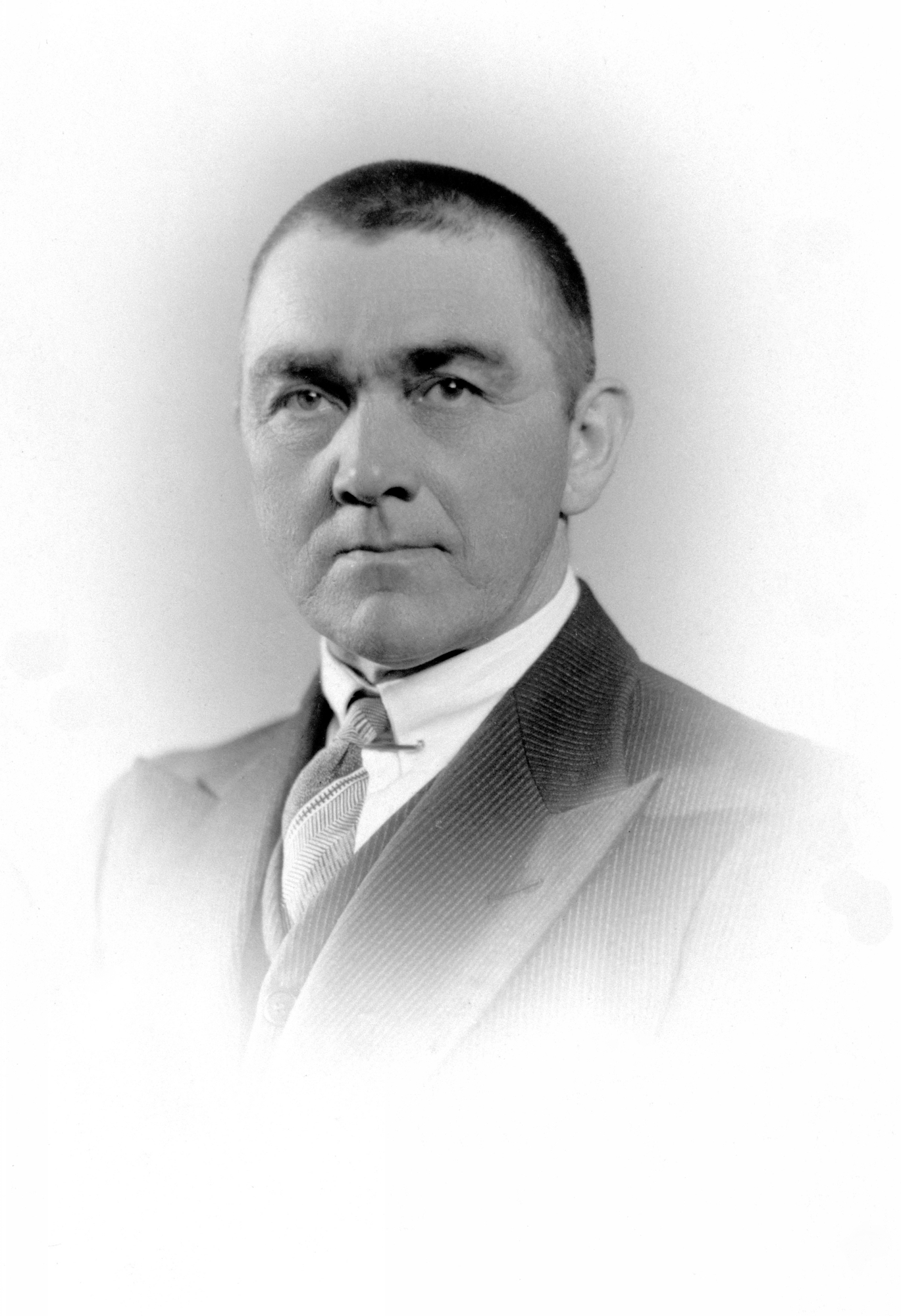

mayor of Hamar
- In office 1935–1940, 1945–1946

deputy mayor of Hamar
- In office 1932–1935

Personal details
- Born: 11 June 1888
- Died: 20 December 1954 (aged 66)
- Political party: Labour and Communist

Kristian Bakken (11 June 1888 – 20 December 1954) was a Norwegian labourer and politician for the Labour and Communist parties.

He was a plate worker by vocation, and worked in Hamar. He was a leading figure in the local Union of Iron and Metalworkers from 1907 until his death, was the second chairman of Hamar faglige samorg and was also a co-founder of the Socialist Youth Association in the city in 1911. He was elected to Hamar city council in 1917, and as the socialists gradually gained ground in the city council he became deputy mayor in 1932–1933. He was promoted to mayor of Hamar in 1935, when his predecessor Sigurd Pedersen was hired as burgomaster and as such was no longer eligible. He won re-election in the 1937 Norwegian local elections.

Bakken was a member of the splinter Communist Party during the 1920s, but in 1926 he was—together with Fredrik Monsen and Olav Larssen—one of the main proponents for a reunification with the Labour Party. The majority of Hedmark Communist Party did not agree, but Bakken was instrumental when the minority rejoined the Labour Party in 1927.

During the early stages of the occupation of Norway by Nazi Germany, in 1940, Bakken was deposed as mayor. In January 1944 he was arrested by the authorities and imprisoned in Grini concentration camp until May. He was then shipped to Sachsenhausen concentration camp and remained here until the liberation of the camps. After the war he returned to his legitimate position as mayor, but relinquished it in 1946. He died in 1954.

Political offices
Preceded by Sigurd Pedersen	Mayor of Hamar; 1935–1940	Succeeded by
Preceded by Einar Grill Fasting (Nazi)	Mayor of Hamar; 1945–1946	Succeeded by Erling Audensen
