= Hamar =

Town in Innlandet, Norway

- Town/City
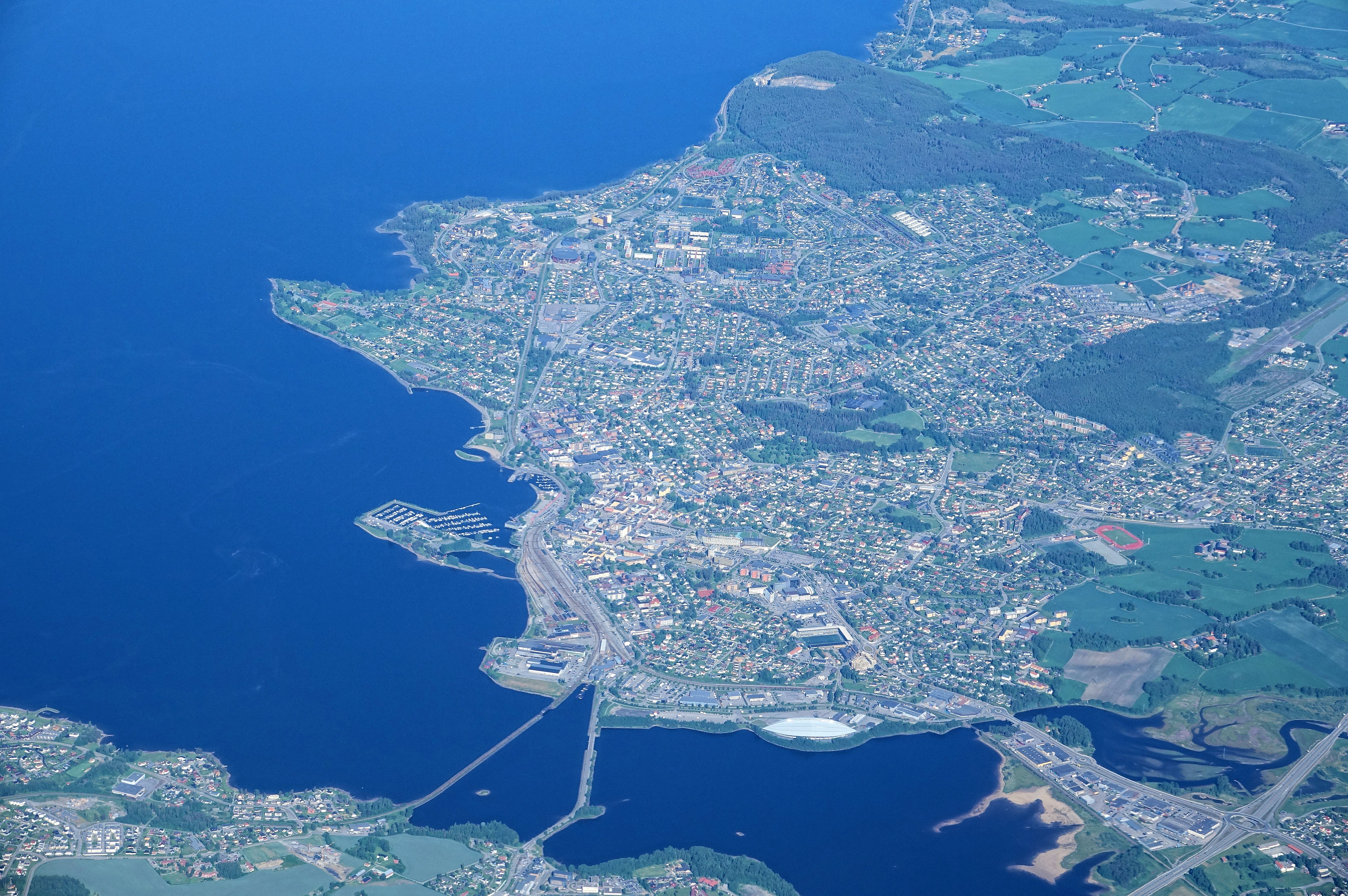
- Aerial view of Hamar

- Coat of arms
- Interactive map of Hamar
- Location within Innlandet Location within Norway
- Coordinates: 60.79451°N 11.06795°E
- Country: Norway
- Region: Eastern Norway
- County: Innlandet
- District: Hedmarken
- Municipality: Hamar Municipality
- Established as
- Kjøpstad, Episcopal see: c.1050–1587
- Kjøpstad: 21 March 1849

Area
  - Total: 14.21 km^{2} (5.49 sq mi)
- Elevation: 127 m (417 ft)

Population (2026)
  - Total: 33,940
  - Density: 2,113/km^{2} (5,470/sq mi)
- Demonym: Hamarenser/Hamarsing
- Time zone: UTC+01:00 (CET)
  - Summer (DST): UTC+02:00 (CEST)
- Post Code: 2300 to 2319
- Climate: Dfb

Hamar (Norwegian: [ˈhɑ̂ːmɑr]) is a City in Hamar Municipality in Innlandet county, Norway. Hamar is the administrative centre of Hamar Municipality. It is located in the traditional region of Hedmarken. The town is located on the shores of Mjøsa, Norway's largest lake. Historically, it was the principal city of the former Hedmark county, now part of the larger Innlandet county.

The city of Hamar lies in the southwestern part of Hamar Municipality. The 14.21-square-kilometre (5.49 sq mi) town has a population (2024) of 30,030 and a population density of 2,113 inhabitants per square kilometre (5,470/sq mi). The urban area of the city actually extends over the municipal borders into both Ringsaker Municipality and Stange Municipality. About 1.7 square kilometres (420 acres) and 2,438 residents within the town are actually located in Ringsaker Municipality and another 0.3 square kilometres (74 acres) and 332 residents of the city are located within Stange Municipality.

== General information ==
=== Name ===
The municipality (originally the town) is named after the old Hamar farm (Old Norse: Hamarr). The medieval market was first built on this farm, and that market eventually became a kjøpstad which in turn became a self-governing municipality. The name is identical with the word hamarr which means "rocky hill".

=== Coat of arms ===
The coat of arms was granted on 2 June 1896. The arms show a Black Grouse sitting in the top of a pine tree on a white background. An older version of the arms had been used for a long time. The old version was first described in the anonymous Hamar Chronicle, written in 1553.

== History ==
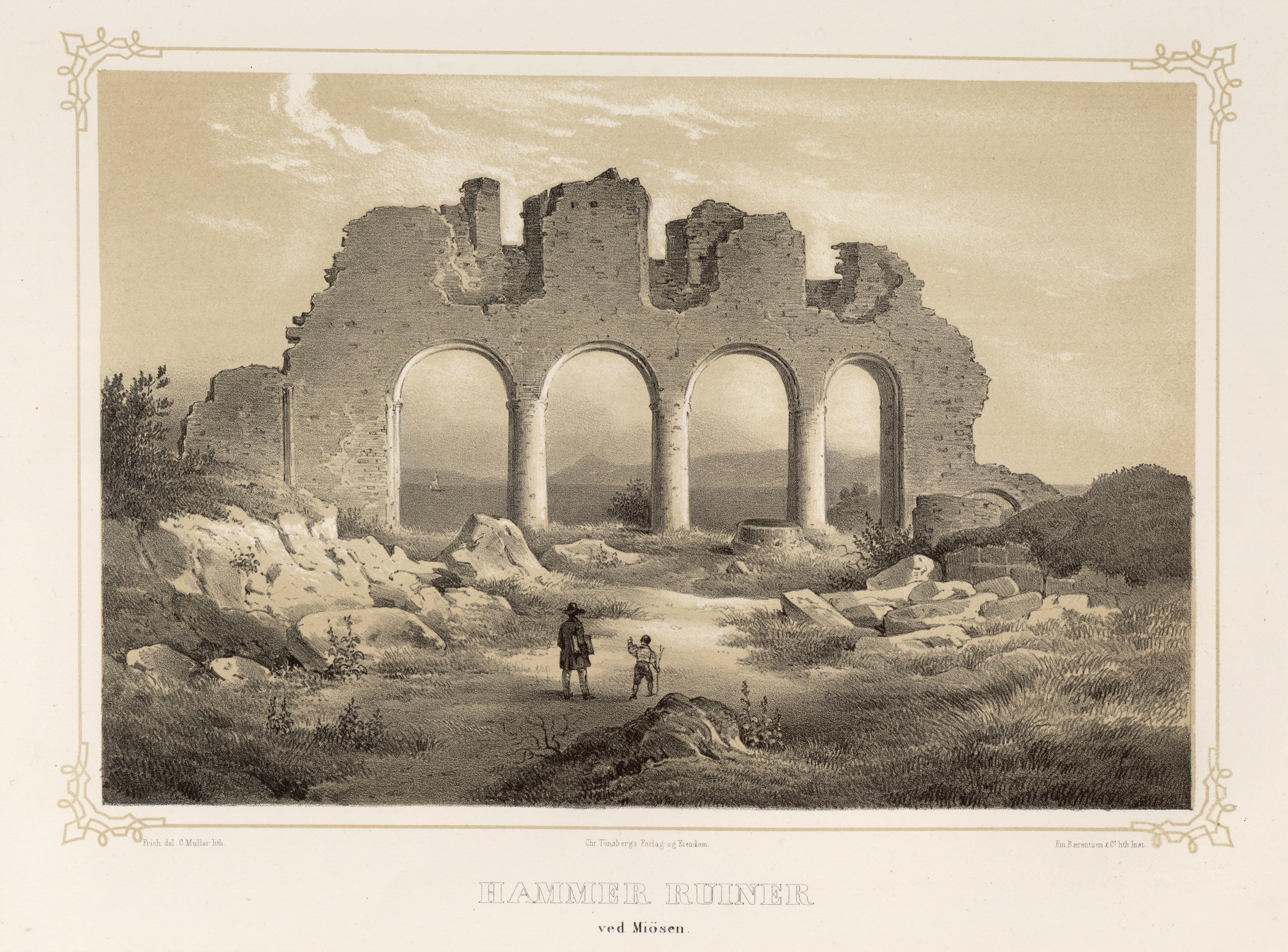
Ruins of the Cathedral; drawing by Joachim Frich (1810–1858), c. 1848

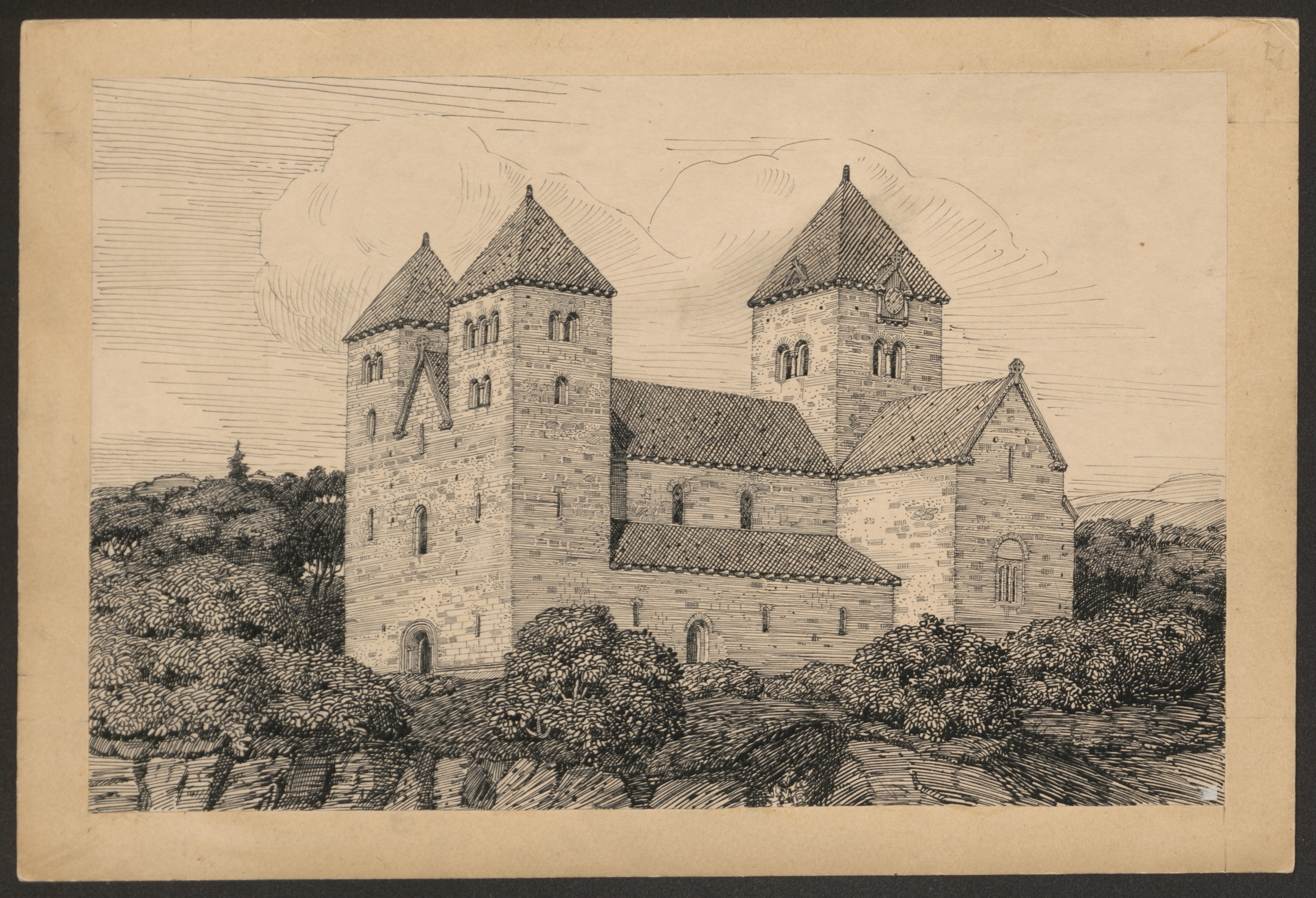
Hamar Cathedral; drawing by Olaf Nordhagen (1883–1925)

Between 500 and 1000 AD, the Åker farm was one of the most important power centres in Norway, located just a few kilometres away from today's town of Hamar. Three coins found in Ringerike in 1895 have been dated to the time of Harald Hardråde and are inscribed Olafr a Hamri.

=== Middle Ages ===
At some point, presumably after 1030 but clearly before 1152, the centre was moved from Åker to the peninsula near Rosenlundvika (today Domkirkeodden) in what is now the town of Hamar. There are some indications that Harald Hardråde initiated this move because he had property at the new site.

Much of the information about medieval Hamar is derived from the Hamar Chronicle, dated to about 1550. The town is said to have reached its apex in the early 14th century, dominated by the Hamar Cathedral, the bishop's manor, and a fortress, plus the surrounding urbanization. The town was known for its fragrant apple orchards, but there were also merchants, craftsmen, and fishermen in the town.

After the Christianization of Norway in 1030, Hamar began to gain influence as a centre for trade and religion. In 1152, the episcopal representative Nikolaus Breakspear founded Hamar Kaupangen as one of five dioceses in medieval Norway. This diocese included all of Hedemarkens Amt and Christians Amt, which were both separated from the Diocese of Oslo in 1152. The first bishop of Hamar was Arnold, Bishop of Gardar, Greenland (1124–1152). He began to build the (now ruined) Cathedral of Christ Church, which was completed about the time of Bishop Paul (1232–1252). Bishop Thorfinn (1278–1282) was exiled and died at Ter Doest abbey in Flanders, and was later canonised. Bishop Jörund (1285–1286) was transferred to Trondheim. A provincial council was held in 1380. Hamar remained an important religious and political centre in Norway, organized around the cathedral and the bishop's manor until the Reformation that took place in 1536–1537. At this time, Hamar lost its status as the seat of the Diocese after the last Catholic bishop, Mogens Lauritssøn (1513–1537), was taken prisoner in his castle at Hamar by Truid Ulfstand, a Danish noble, and then sent to Antvorskov in Denmark, where he was mildly treated until he died in 1542. At Hamar's peak, there was a Cathedral chapter with ten canons, a school, a Dominican Priory of St. Olaf, and a monastery of the Canons Regular of St. Anthony of Vienna.

Hamar, like most of Norway, was severely diminished by the Black Plague in 1349, and by all accounts continued this decline until the Reformation, after which it disappeared.

The Reformation in Norway took less than ten years to complete, from 1526 to 1536. During this time, the fortress in Hamar was made into the residence of the sheriff and renamed Hamarhus fortress. The cathedral was still used as a regular church, but it fell into disrepair, culminating with the Swedish army's siege and attempted demolition in 1567, during the Northern Seven Years' War. The old bishop's manor was also devastated during this siege.

=== Reformation and decline ===
By 1587, merchants in Christiania had succeeded in moving all of Hamar's market activities to Christiania such that Hamar lost its status as a market town (kjøpstad). Though some regional and seasonal trade persisted into the 17th century, Hamar as a town ceased to exist by then. In its place, the area was used for agriculture under the Storhamar farm, though the ruins of the cathedral, fortress, and lesser buildings became landmarks for centuries since then.

The King made Hamarhus a feudal seat until 1649, when Frederick III transferred the property known as Hammer to Hannibal Sehested, making it private property. In 1716, the estate was sold to Jens Grønbech (1666–1734). With this, a series of construction projects started, and the farm became known as Storhamar, passing through several owners until Norwegian nobility was abolished in 1831, when Erik Anker took over the farm.

=== The founding of modern Hamar ===
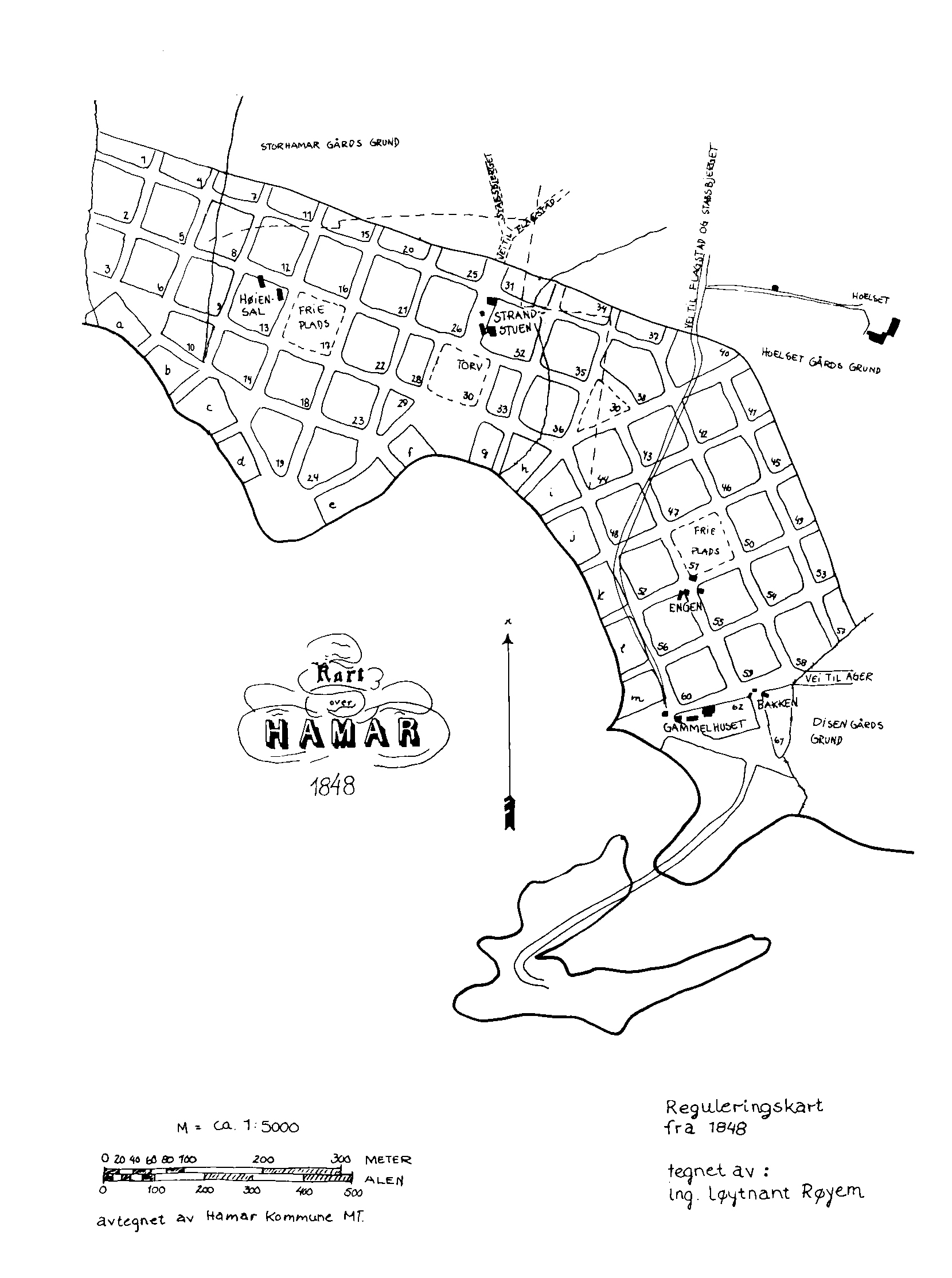
City plan for Hamar, c. 1848

As early as 1755, the Danish government in Copenhagen expressed an interest in establishing a trading center on the shores of the lake Mjøsa. Elverum was considered a frontier town with frequent unrest, and there was even talk of encouraging the dissenting Hans Nielsen Hauge to settle in the area. Bishop Fredrik Julius Bech, one of the most prominent officials of his time, proposed establishing a town at or near Storhamar, at the foot of Furuberget.

In 1812, negotiations started in earnest when the regional governor of Christians Amt proposed establishing a market on Mjøsa. A four-person commission was named on 26 July 1814, with the mandate of determining a suitable site for a new town along the shore. On 8 June 1815, the commission recommended establishing such a town at Lillehammer, then also a farm, part of the prestegjeld of Faaberg.

Acting on objections to this recommendation, the Department of the Interior asked two professors, Ludvig Stoud Platou and Gregers Fougner Lundh, to survey the area and develop an alternative recommendation. It appears that Lundh, in particular, put great effort into this assignment, and in 1824 he presented to the Storting a lengthy report that included maps and plans for the new town.

Lundh's premise was that the national economic interest reigned supreme, so he based his recommendation on the proposed town's ability to quickly achieve self-sustaining growth. He proposed that the name of the new town be called Carlshammer and proposed it be built along the shore just north of Storhamar and eastward. His plans were detailed, calling for streets that were 20 metres (66 ft) wide, rectangular blocks with 12 buildings in each, 2 metres (6 ft 7 in) separating each of them. He also proposed tax relief for 20 years for the town's first residents, that the state relinquish property taxes in favor of the town, and that the town be given monopoly rights to certain trade. He even proposed that certain types of foreigners be allowed to settle in the town to promote trade, in particular, the Quakers.

His recommendation was accepted in principle by the government, but the parliamentary committee equivocated on the location. It left the determination of the actual site to the king so as not to slow down things further. Another commission was named in June 1825, consisting of Herman Wedel-Jarlsberg, Professor Lundh, and other prominent Norwegians. After surveying the entire lake, it submitted another report that considered eleven different locations, including sites near today's Eidsvoll, Minnesund, Tangen (in Stange), Åker, Storhamar, Brumunddal, Nes, Moelven, Lillehammer, Gjøvik, and Toten. Each was presented with pros and cons. The commission itself was split between Lillehammer and Storhamar. The parliament finally decided on Lillehammer, relegating Hamar once more, it seemed, to be a sleepy agricultural area.

As steamboats were introduced on the lake, the urban elite developed an interest in the medieval Hamar, and in 1841, editorials appeared advocating the re-establishment of a town at Storhamar. By then, the limitations of Lillehammer's location had also become apparent, in particular those of its shallow harbor. After a few more years of discussions and negotiations, both regionally and nationally, Member of Parliament Frederik Stang put on the table once more the possibility of a town in or near Storhamar. The governor at the time, Frederik Hartvig Johan Heidmann, presented a thorough deliberation of possible specific locations and ended up proposing the current site, at Gammelhusbukten.

On 26 April 1848, the king signed into law the establishment of Hamar as a kjøpstad on the grounds of the farms of Storhamar and Holset, along the shores of the lake Mjøsa. The law stated that the town would be founded on the date its borders are settled, which turned out to be 21 March 1849. Hamar was given a trading zone up to 5 kilometres (3.1 mi) from its border. The new town was separated from Vang Municipality and established as Hamar Municipality under the formannskapsdistrikt law that was passed in 1838.

=== Building a city ===
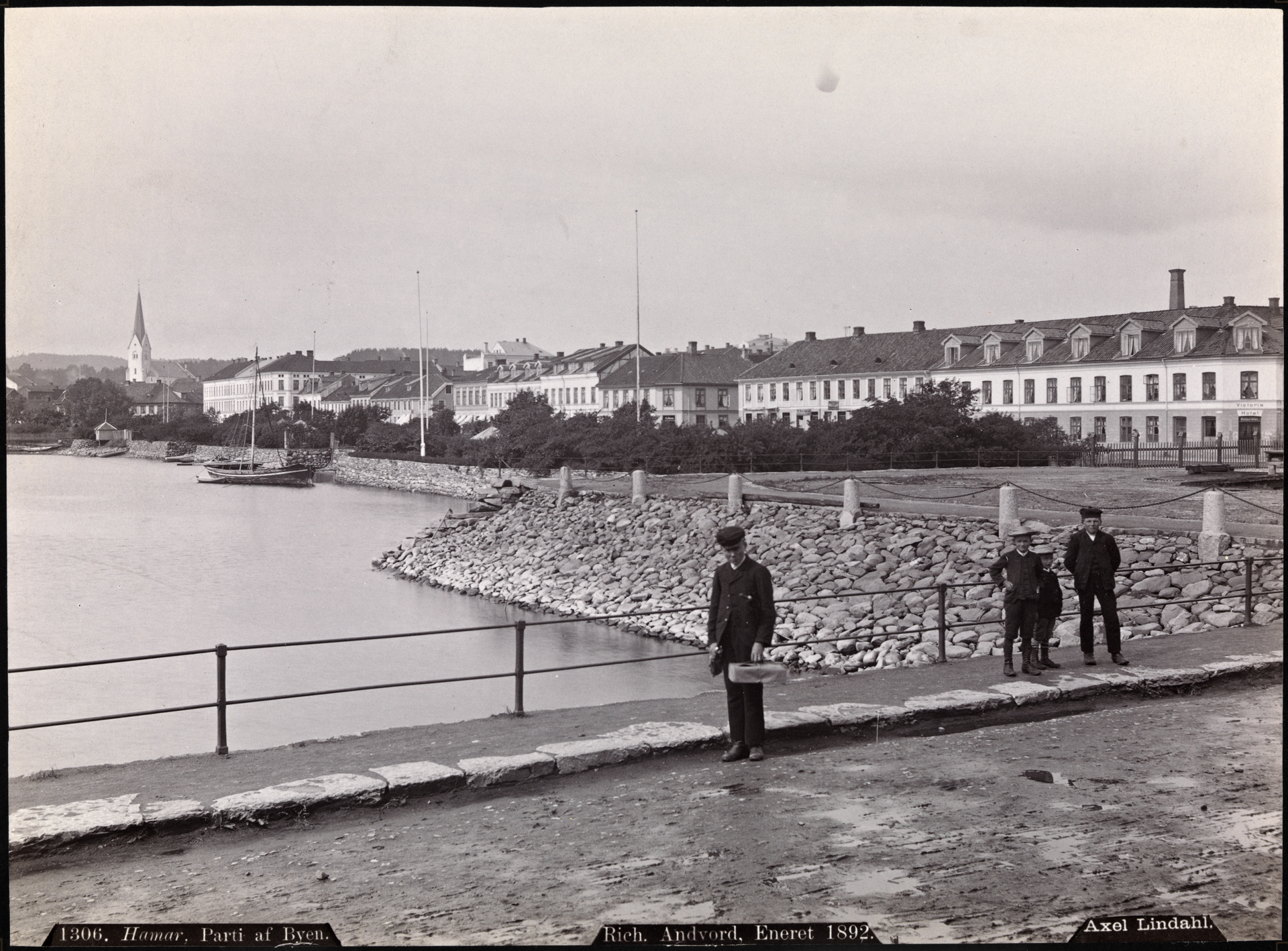
View of Hamar in the 1890s

The area of the new town and municipality covered an area measuring "400 mål", which is the equivalent of today's 40 hectares (99 acres). An army engineer, Røyem, drafted the initial plan. There would be three thoroughfares, at Strandgata, Torggata, and Grønnegate (the latter the name of a medieval road), and a grid system of streets between them. The orientation of the town was toward the shore. Røyem set aside space for three parks and a public square, and also room for a church just outside the town border.

There were critics of the plan, pointing out that the terrain was hilly and not suitable for the proposed rigid grid. Some adjustments were made, but the plan was largely accepted and is evident in today's Hamar. There were also lingering concerns about the town's vulnerability to flooding.

Construction began as soon as the law passed, in the spring of 1849. The first buildings were much like sheds, but there was great enthusiasm, and by the end of 1849, ten buildings were insured in the new town. None of these are standing today; the last two were adjacent buildings on Skappelsgate. By 1850, there were 31 insured houses; in 1852, there were 42; and in 1853, 56. Building slowed down for a few years and then picked up again in 1858, and by the end of 1860, there were a hundred insured houses in the town. The shore-side properties were obliged to grow gardens, setting the stage for a leafy urban landscape.

Roads quickly became a challenge – in some places, it was necessary to ford creeks in the middle of town. The road inspector found himself under considerable stress, and it took until 1869 to settle on street names. Highways in and out of the city also caused considerable debate, especially regarding how to finance them.

The first passenger terminal in Hamar was in fact a crag in the lake, from which travelers were rowed into the city. In 1850, another pier was built with a two-storey terminal building. All this was complicated by the significant seasonal variations in water levels. In 1857, a canal was built around a basin that would allow freight ships to access a large warehouse. Although the canal and basin still were not deep enough to accommodate passenger steamships, the area became one of the busiest areas in the town and the point around which the harbor was further developed.

The Diocese of Hamar was established in 1864, and the Hamar Cathedral was consecrated in 1866 and remains a central point in the city.

A promenade came into being from the harbor area, past the gardens on the shore, and north toward the site of the old town.

=== Establishment of government ===
The first executive of Hamar was Johannes Bay, who arrived in October 1849 to facilitate an election of a board of supervisors and representatives. The town's royal charter called for the election of three supervisors and nine representatives. Elections were announced in the paper and through the town crier. Of the ten eligible town citizens, three supervisors were elected, and the remaining six were elected by consent to be representatives, resulting in a shortfall of three on the board. The first mayor of Hamar was Christian Borchgrevink.

The first order of business was the allocation of liquor licenses and the upper limit of alcohol that could be sold within the town limits. The board quickly decided to award licenses to both applicants and set the upper limit to 12,000 "pots" of liquor, an amount that was, for all intents and purposes, limitless.

The electorate increased in 1849 to 26, including merchants and various craftsmen, and the empty representative posts were filled in November. In 1850, the board allowed for unlimited exercise of any craft for which no citizenship had been taken out, which led to much unregulated craftsmanship. Part-time policemen were hired, and the town started setting taxes and a budget by the end of 1849. In 1850, a new election was held for the town board.

The painter Jakobsen had early on offered the use of his home for public meetings and assembly, and upon buying a set of solid locks, his basement also became the town prison. One merchant was designated as the town's firefighter and was given two buckets with equipment, and later a simple hose. By 1852, a full-time fire chief was named. There was also some controversy around the watchman who loudly reported the time to all the town's inhabitants every half-hour, every night. Hamar also had a scrupulously enforced ordinance against smoking (pipe) without a lid in public or private.

In Hamar's early days, the entire population consisted of young entrepreneurs, and little was needed in the way of social services. After a few years, a small number of indigent people needed support, and a poorhouse was erected.

On 1 January 1878, the town/municipality of Hamar was enlarged by annexing about 800 decares (200 acres) of land and 138 people from the neighboring Vang Municipality to Hamar.

=== Fires, floods, and other disasters ===
In 1860, concerns about flooding were vindicated when a late and sudden spring caused the lake to flood, peaking around 24 June, when the street-level floor of the front properties was completely inundated. This was the worst flood recorded since 1789. By 9 July, the flooding had receded. In August, massive rainfall led to flash flooding in the area, putting several streets under water. This was immediately followed by unseasonably cold weather, freezing the potato crops and inconveniencing Hamar's residents. Then mild weather set in, and melted all the ice and accumulated snow, which led to another round of flooding. By the time a particularly cold and snow-filled winter set in, there was mostly relief about getting some stability.

In 1876, the town was scandalized by the apprehension of one Kristoffer Svartbækken, arrested for the cold-blooded murder of 19-year-old Even Nilsen Dæhlin. Svartbækken was convicted of the murder and executed the following year in the neighboring rural community of Løten, with an audience of 3,000 locals, presumably the majority of Hamar's population at the time.

In 1878, as the firefighting capabilities of the young town were upgraded, a fire broke out in a bakery. The fire was put out without doing too much damage. In February 1879, at 2:00 in the morning, another fire broke out after festivities, burning down an entire building that housed many historical items from the town. This was followed by a series of fires that left entire blocks in ashes. The fires kept happening until 1881, when a professional fire corps was hired.

In 1889, there were riots in Hamar over the arrest of one of their own constables, one Sergeant Huse, who had been insubordinate while on a military drill at the cavalry camp at Gardermoen. In an act of poor judgment, Huse's superior sent him to Hamar's prison in place of military stockades. Partly led and partly tolerated by other constables, the town's population engaged in demonstrations, marches, and other unlawful but non-violent acts that were effectively ended when a company of soldiers arrived from the camp at Terningmoen near Elverum.

Composer Fredrikke Waaler founded and directed the first orchestra in Hamar in 1893. She also directed a choir and wrote a song for the city.

=== Modern era ===
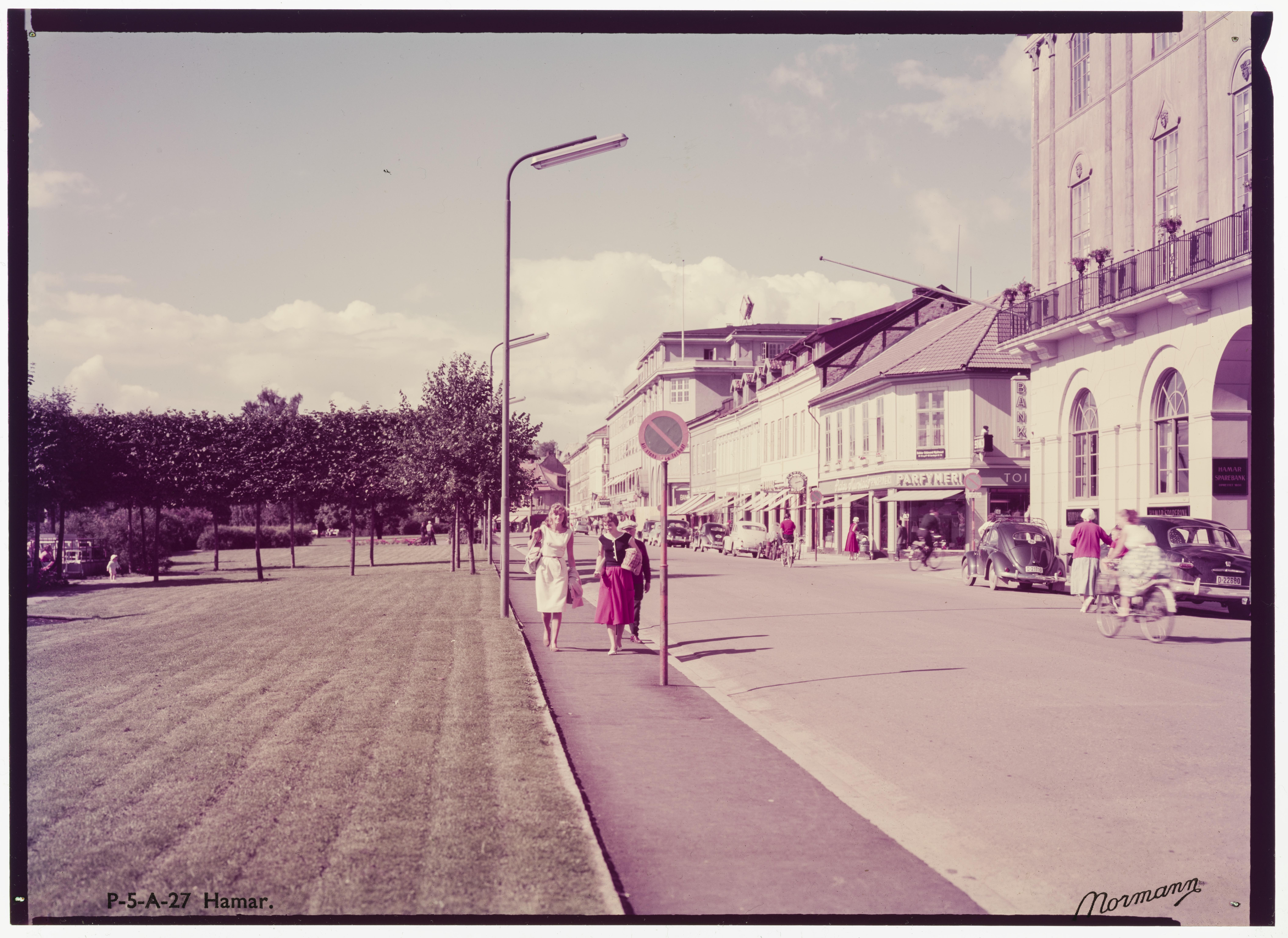
Hamar, 1960s

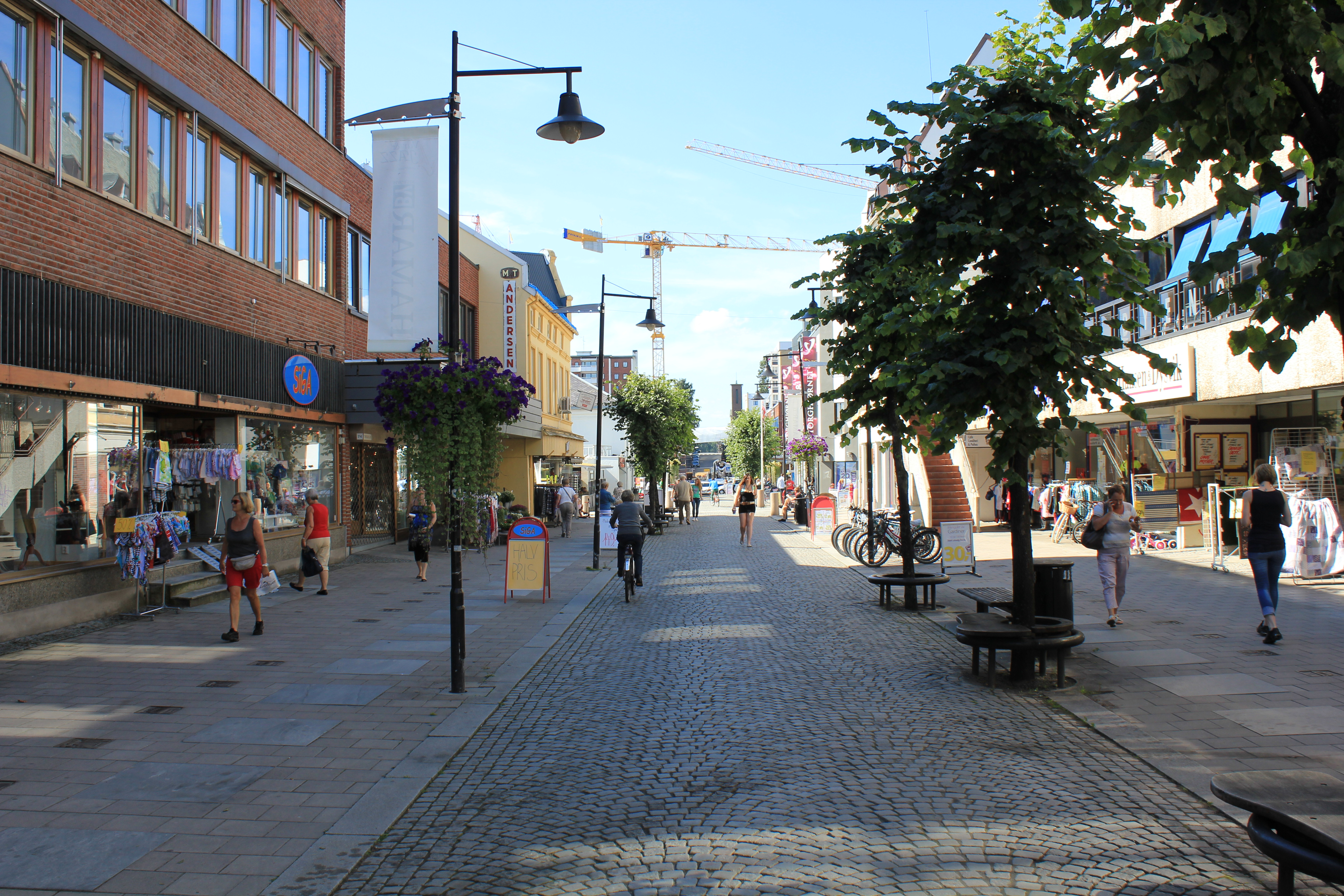
The walking street at Hamar (Gågata)

In 1946, a large area in Vang that surrounded the town of Hamar (population: 4,087) was transferred out of Vang and merged into Hamar. The following year, a part of the neighboring Furnes Municipality (population: 821) was also merged into Hamar. On 1 January 1965, a part of Ringsaker Municipality with a population of about 100 people was transferred to Hamar.

In 1975, Storhamar Church was built to serve Hamar's growing population.

On 1 January 1992, all of Vang Municipality (population: 9,103) was merged with the town of Hamar (population: 16,351) and parts of the Stensby, Hanstad, Viker, and Stammerud areas of Ringsaker Municipality (population: 224) to form a new, larger Hamar Municipality.

== Cityscape ==
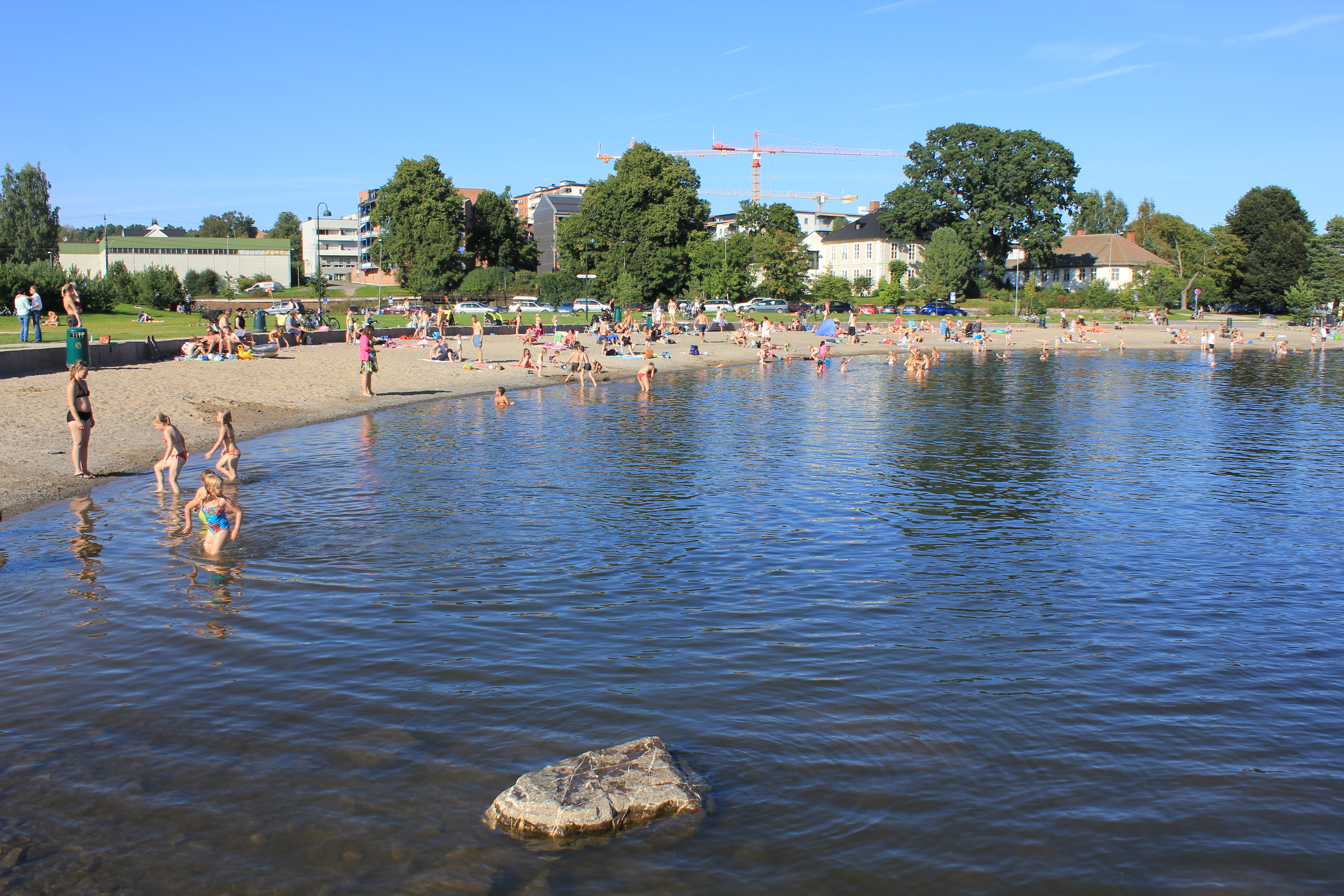
The beach at Koigen in Hamar

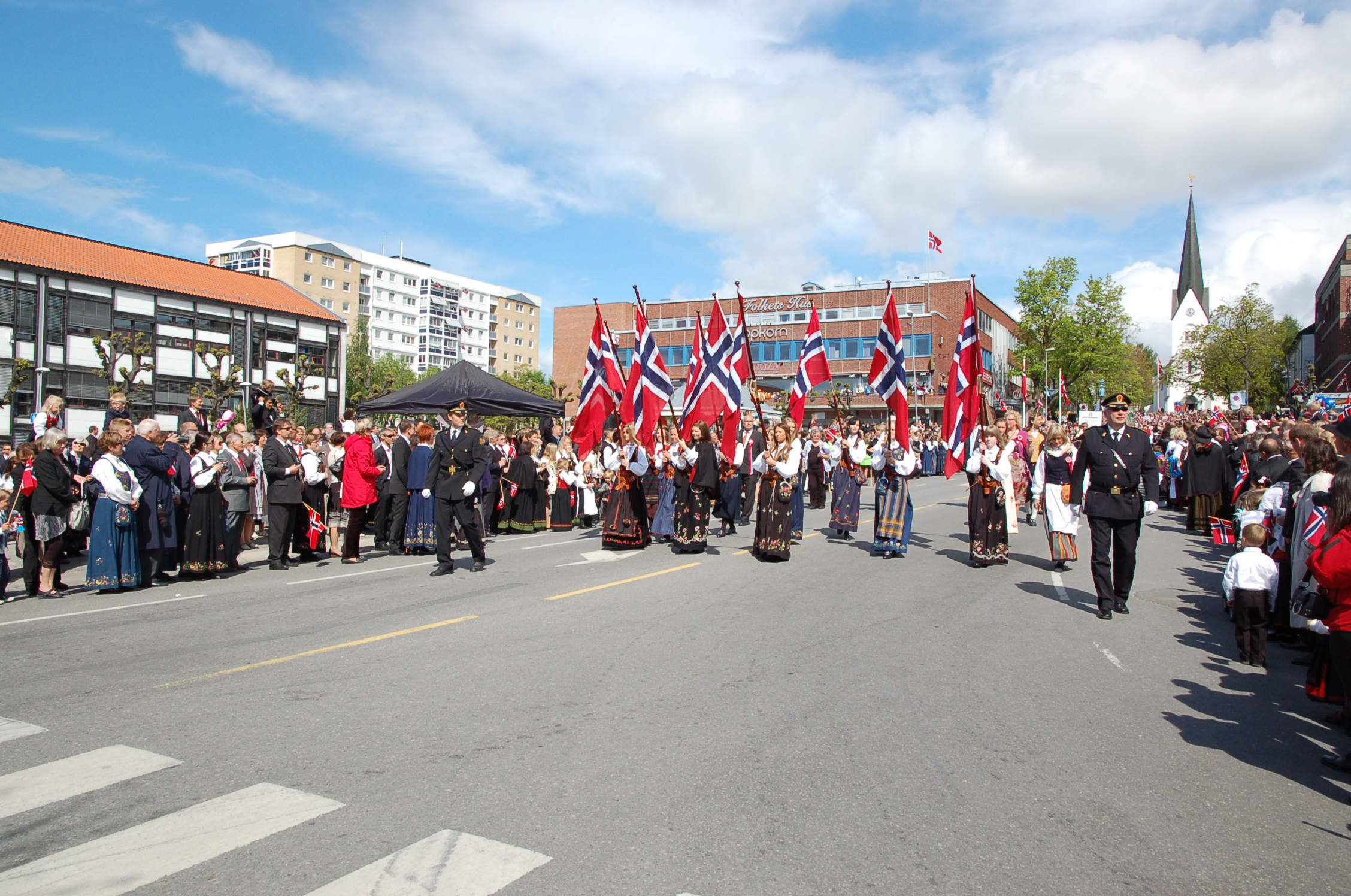
Norwegian national day at Stortorget, 2011

The Hedmark museum, located on Domkirkeodden, is an important historical landmark in Hamar, an outdoor museum with remains of the medieval church, in a protective glass housing, the episcopal fortress, and a collection of old farmhouses. The institution is a combined medieval, ethnological, and archaeological museum, and has received architectural prizes for its approach to conservation and exhibition. It also houses a vast photographic archive for the Hedmark region.

Additionally, Hamar is known for its indoor long track speed skating and bandy arena, the Olympia Hall, better known as Vikingskipet ("The Viking ship") for its shape. It was built to host the speed skating competitions of the 1994 Winter Olympics that were held in nearby Lillehammer. Already in 1993 it hosted the Bandy World Championship. The Vikingskipet Olympic Arena was later used in the winter of 2007 as the service park for Rally Norway, the second round of the 2007 World Rally Championship season. It has been the host for the world's second largest computer party The Gathering starting on the Wednesday in Easter each year, since 1996.

Also situated in Hamar is the Hamar Olympic Amphitheatre, which hosted the figure skating and short track speed skating events of the 1994 Winter Olympics. The figure skating competition was highly anticipated. It featured Nancy Kerrigan and Tonya Harding, who drew most of the media attention; however, the gold medal was won by Oksana Baiul of Ukraine.

The centre of Hamar is the pedestrian walkway in the middle of town, with the library, cinema, and farmer's market on Stortorget (the big square) on the western side, and Østre Torg (the eastern square), which sits on top of an underground multi-story carpark, on the eastern side.

== Transport ==
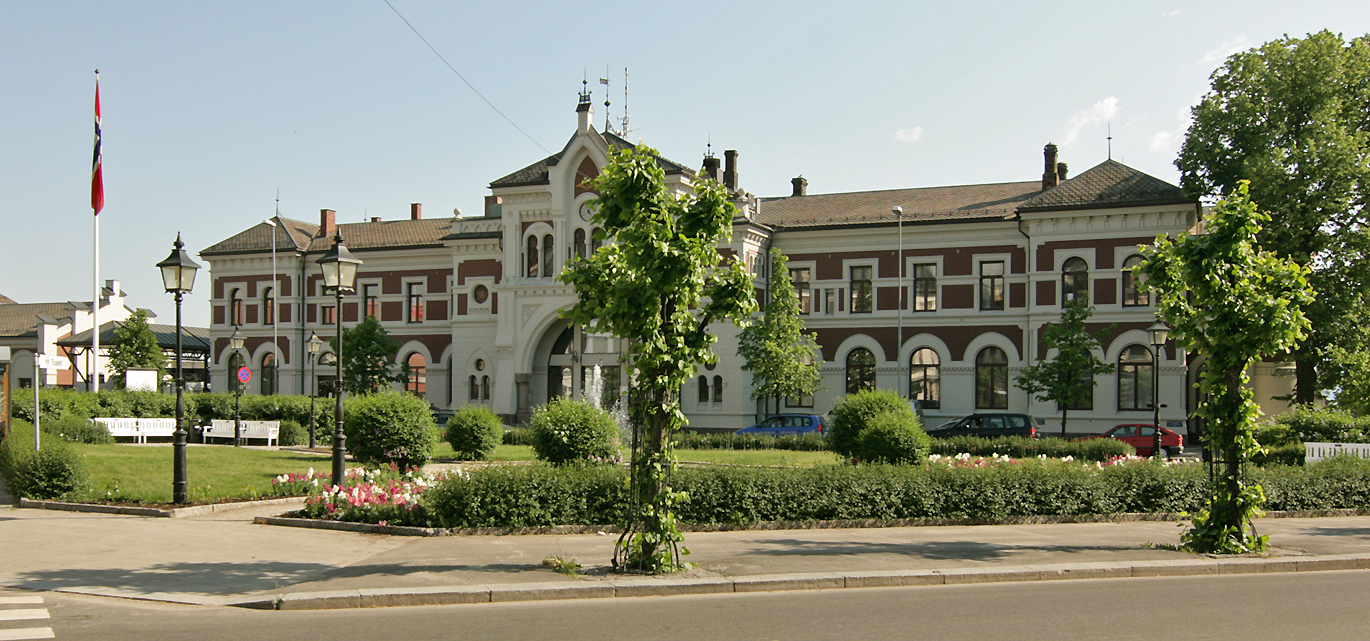
Hamar Railway Station

Hamar is an important railway junction between two different lines from Oslo to Trondheim. Rørosbanen, the old railway line, branches off from the mainline Dovre Line. The Norwegian Railway Museum (Norsk Jernbanemuseum) is also in Hamar. Hamar Airport, Stafsberg caters to general aviation. The nearest passenger airport is Oslo Airport, located 89.5 kilometers (55.6 mi) south of Hamar, it's easily accessible by road through the E6 and also by train, which is a 44-minute journey from Hamar Station.

== Climate ==
Hamar has a humid continental climate (Dfb) with fairly dry and cold winters, and comfortably warm summers. The Hamar II weather station, at an elevation of 141 metres (463 ft), started recording in 1968. The all-time high 33.0 °C (91.4 °F) was recorded in July 2018, which was the warmest month on record with average daily high 28.8 °C (83.8 °F) and mean 21.6 °C (70.9 °F). The all-time low −29.8 °C (−21.6 °F) is from December 2010, which was a very cold month with a mean −14.0 °C (6.8 °F) and an average daily low −18.2 °C (−0.8 °F). A previous weather station (Hamar I, at an elevation of 139 m) recorded the coldest month on record with a mean −17.2 °C (1.0 °F) in January 1917. In August 1975, the weather station "Staur Forsøksgård" in nearby Stange recorded 35 °C (95 °F).

Climate data for Hamar 1991-2020 (141 m, extremes 2008-2022, precipitation days 1961-90)
Month	Jan	Feb	Mar	Apr	May	Jun	Jul	Aug	Sep	Oct	Nov	Dec	Year
Record high °C (°F)	10.7 (51.3)	10.0 (50.0)	19.1 (66.4)	23.8 (74.8)	30.0 (86.0)	32.0 (89.6)	33.0 (91.4)	29.2 (84.6)	25.0 (77.0)	19.2 (66.6)	16.3 (61.3)	10.9 (51.6)	33.0 (91.4)
Mean daily maximum °C (°F)	−2.9 (26.8)	−0.9 (30.4)	4.3 (39.7)	10.5 (50.9)	16.0 (60.8)	20.2 (68.4)	22.5 (72.5)	20.5 (68.9)	16.1 (61.0)	8.9 (48.0)	3.0 (37.4)	−1.7 (28.9)	9.7 (49.5)
Daily mean °C (°F)	−5.7 (21.7)	−5.3 (22.5)	−1.1 (30.0)	4.4 (39.9)	10.3 (50.5)	14.6 (58.3)	17.0 (62.6)	15.5 (59.9)	10.9 (51.6)	5.0 (41.0)	0.1 (32.2)	−4.5 (23.9)	5.1 (41.2)
Mean daily minimum °C (°F)	−8.4 (16.9)	−8.2 (17.2)	−5.1 (22.8)	−0.3 (31.5)	5.6 (42.1)	10.2 (50.4)	12.2 (54.0)	10.7 (51.3)	6.7 (44.1)	2.1 (35.8)	−1.7 (28.9)	−6.7 (19.9)	1.4 (34.6)
Record low °C (°F)	−29.0 (−20.2)	−29.5 (−21.1)	−26.0 (−14.8)	−15.4 (4.3)	−3.7 (25.3)	0.0 (32.0)	4.4 (39.9)	3.0 (37.4)	−2.9 (26.8)	−12.5 (9.5)	−20.7 (−5.3)	−29.8 (−21.6)	−29.8 (−21.6)
Average precipitation mm (inches)	21.6 (0.85)	15.0 (0.59)	15.5 (0.61)	27.6 (1.09)	55.6 (2.19)	55.0 (2.17)	67.8 (2.67)	71.7 (2.82)	55.5 (2.19)	48.6 (1.91)	40.7 (1.60)	25.5 (1.00)	500.1 (19.69)
Average precipitation days (≥ 1.0 mm)	8	6	7	6	8	10	10	10	10	9	9	8	101
Source 1: eklima.no (mean, precipitaiton, extremes)
Source 2: Infoclimat (avg high/low temperatures)

== Sport ==
Map of the 1994 Winter Olympics venues

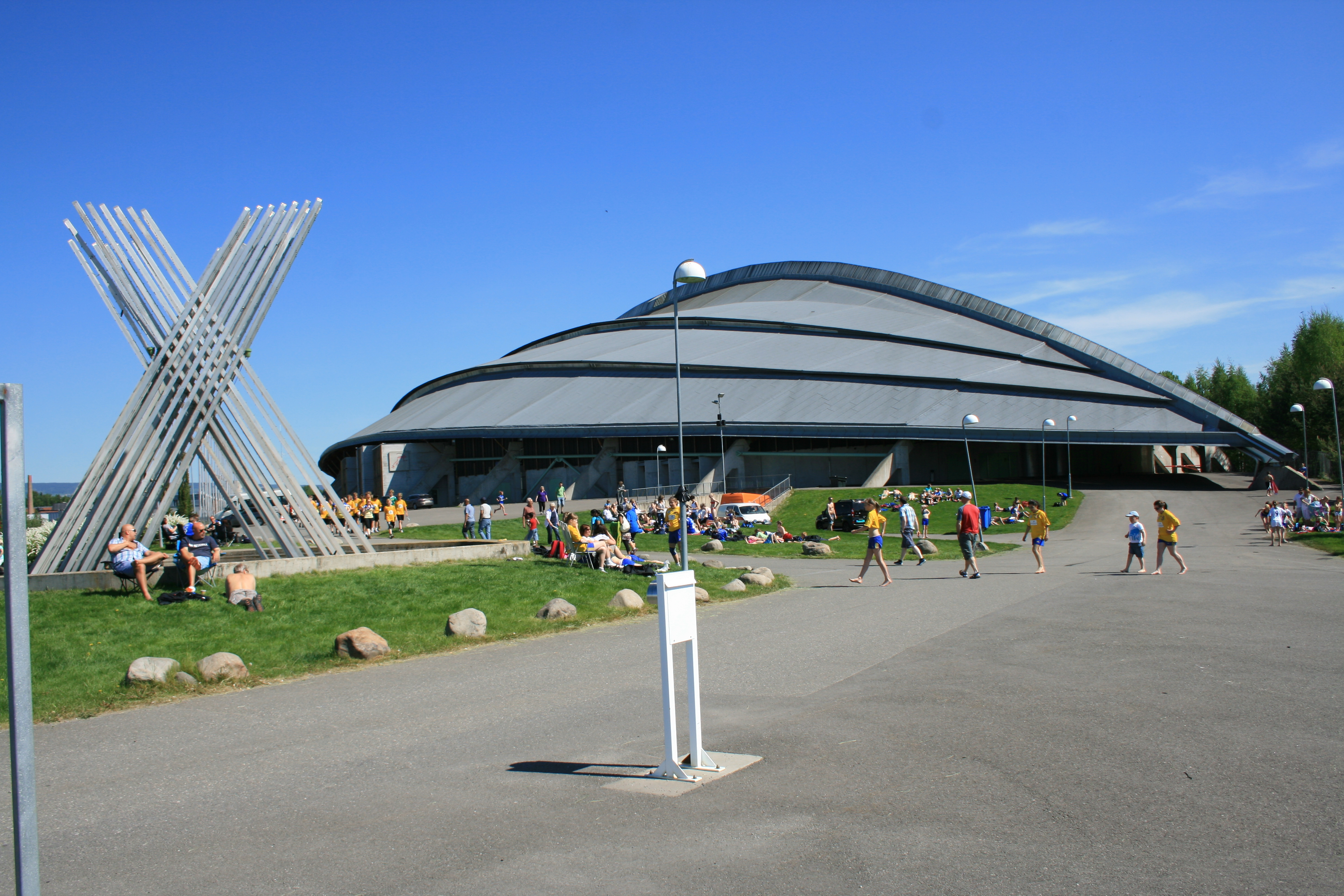
Vikingskipet, an Olympic venue of 1994

=== Team sports ===
Hamar boasts several teams at the Norwegian top level in various sports:

- Hamarkameratene (Ham-Kam) is a football club that plays in the Eliteserien, the top tier of Norwegian football.
- Storhamar Ishockey is an ice hockey team which is currently playing in the Norwegian GET-ligaen. The club has won the title a total of seven times, most recently during the 2017–18 season.
- Storhamar HE is a handball team that plays in Eliteserien, who won the 2024-25 Norwegian Championship.
- Fart IL is a women's football team currently playing its first season in the top league.
- Hamar Idrettslag has played in the highest bandy division recently, but this season, 2009–2010, they play in the 2nd.

=== Individual sports ===
Hamar is known for its speed skating history, both for its skaters and the championships that have been hosted by the city. Already in 1894, Hamar hosted its first European championship, and the first World Championship the following year. After the Vikingskipet was built, Hamar has hosted international championships regularly.

The most notable skaters from Hamar are Dag Fornæss and Even Wetten, both former World champions, allround and 1000m respectively. Amund Sjøbrend, Ådne Søndrål and Eskil Ervik have all been members of the local club Hamar IL, although they were not born in Hamar.

In Hamar on 17 July 1993, Scottish cyclist Graeme Obree set a world record for the longest distance covered in an hour. His 51,596 metres broke the 51,151 set at altitude nine years earlier. The record lasted only six days before Chris Boardman beat it in Bordeaux, France.

Motorcycle speedway has had a long association with Hamar, covering three venues. The Norwegian Championship was held at Hamar Idrettsplassen in 1939 and at the Briskebyen Utstillingsplassen in 1954. The Speedway Grand Prix of Norway was held at the Vikingskipet from 2002 to 2004.

=== Events ===
Hamar was the venue of three sports during the 1994 Winter Olympics, figure skating, short track and speed skating.

== International relations ==
=== Twin towns – Sister cities ===
The following cities, both in Scandinavia and around the world, are twinned with Hamar:

- Dalvík, Iceland
- Fargo, North Dakota, United States
- Greifswald, Mecklenburg-Vorpommern, Germany
- Karmiel, Northern District, Israel
- (Palestine) Khan Yunis, Gaza Strip, Palestinian territories
- Lund, Skåne County, Sweden
- Porvoo, Uusimaa, Finland
- Viborg, Region Midtjylland, Denmark
- Hamar, North Dakota, United States

== In literature and popular culture ==
Part of the plot of "The Axe", the first volume of Sigrid Undset's "The Master of Hestviken", is set in Medieval Hamar. The book's young lovers, denied the right to marry by malicious relatives, come to the town to try to get the help of the kindly and compassionate Bishop Thorfinn of Hamar.

Jorma Kaukonen, former guitarist of Jefferson Airplane, celebrated his love of speed-skating in the song Hamar Promenade on his 1974 album Quah.

Norwegian jazz-pop singer/songwriter Silje Nergaard dedicated her album Hamar Railway Station, released in December 2020, to Hamar's railway junction.

== Notable residents ==
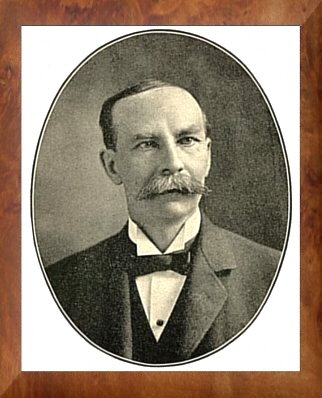
Hans Jevne

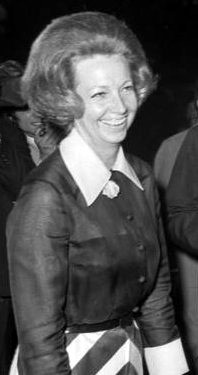
Rut Brandt, 1970

=== Public Service ===
- Claus Bendeke (1763–1828), jurist and representative at the Norwegian Constitutional Assembly
- Hans Jevne (1849–1927), grocer and civic leader in early Los Angeles
- Gustav Heiberg (1856–1935), barrister and mayor of Hamar in the 1910s
- Olav Johan Sopp (1860–1931), mycologist
- Martin Rønne (1861–1932), sail maker and polar explorer
- Katti Anker Møller (1868–1945), feminist, children's rights and civil rights activist
- Carl Schiøtz (1877–1938), physician and professor of hygiene and bacteriology
- Einar Grill Fasting (1883–1958), Nazi, co-founded the Hamar branch of Nasjonal Samling
- WFK Christie (1885–1956), jurist in Hamar, co-founded the Hamar branch of Nasjonal Samling
- Thorolf Vogt (1888–1958), geologist, professor, and Arctic explorer
- Kristian Bakken (1888–1954), labourer and politician, mayor of Hamar in the 1930s
- Rikka Deinboll (1897–1973), librarian and translator
- Kristian Birger Gundersen (1907–1977), politician, mayor of Hamar in the 1960s and 70s
- Ingrid Semmingsen (1910–1995), the first female professor of history in Norway
- Rut Brandt (1920–2006), writer, second wife of Willy Brandt
- Haakon Melhuus (born 1947), meteorologist and weather presenter
- Einar Busterud (born 1953), politician, mayor of Hamar since 2015
- Trygve Slagsvold Vedum (born 1978), politician, party leader, and government minister
- Anette Trettebergstuen (born 1981), openly lesbian politician

=== The Arts ===
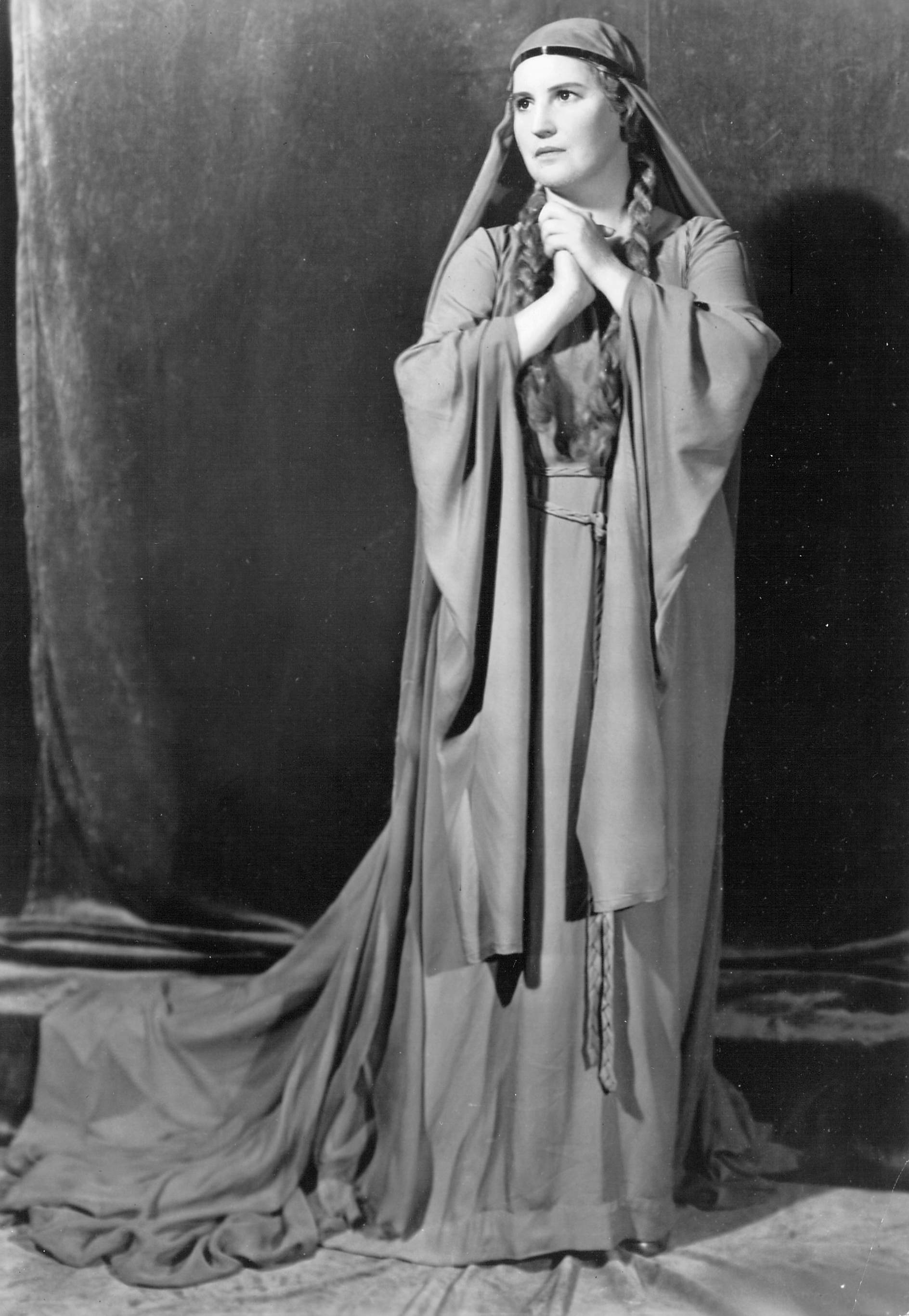
Kirsten Flagstad as Isolde

- Hulda Garborg (1862–1934), novelist, playwright, poet, and folk dancer
- Ulrikke Greve (1868–1951), leading textile artist, excelling in tapestry work
- Kirsten Flagstad (1895–1962), opera singer and highly regarded Wagnerian soprano
- Rolf Jacobsen (1907–1994), author, poet, and modernist writer
- Øivind Bergh (1909–1987), violinist and orchestral leader
- Jens Book-Jenssen (1910–1999), singer, songwriter, revue artist, and theatre director
- Sigurd Evensmo (1912–1978), author and journalist
- Gerd Thoreid (1924–2020), stand-up comedian and singer
- Kjell Heggelund (1932–2017), literary researcher, lecturer, editor, poet, and literary critic
- Knut Faldbakken (born 1941), novelist and writer
- Torill Kove (born 1958), Canadian film director and award-winning animator
- Ole Edvard Antonsen (born 1962), trumpeter, musician, and conductor
- Merete Morken Andersen (born 1965), novelist, children's writer, and magazine editor
- Ole Børud (born 1976), singer, songwriter, and instrumentalist
- Anders Baasmo Christiansen (born 1976), actor
- Ryan Wiik (born 1981), actor and entrepreneur, resides in Los Angeles
- Mari Chauhan (born 1988), beauty pageant titleholder, Miss Norway 2013
- Elise Dalby (born 1995), model and beauty pageant titleholder, Miss Norway 2014

=== Sport ===
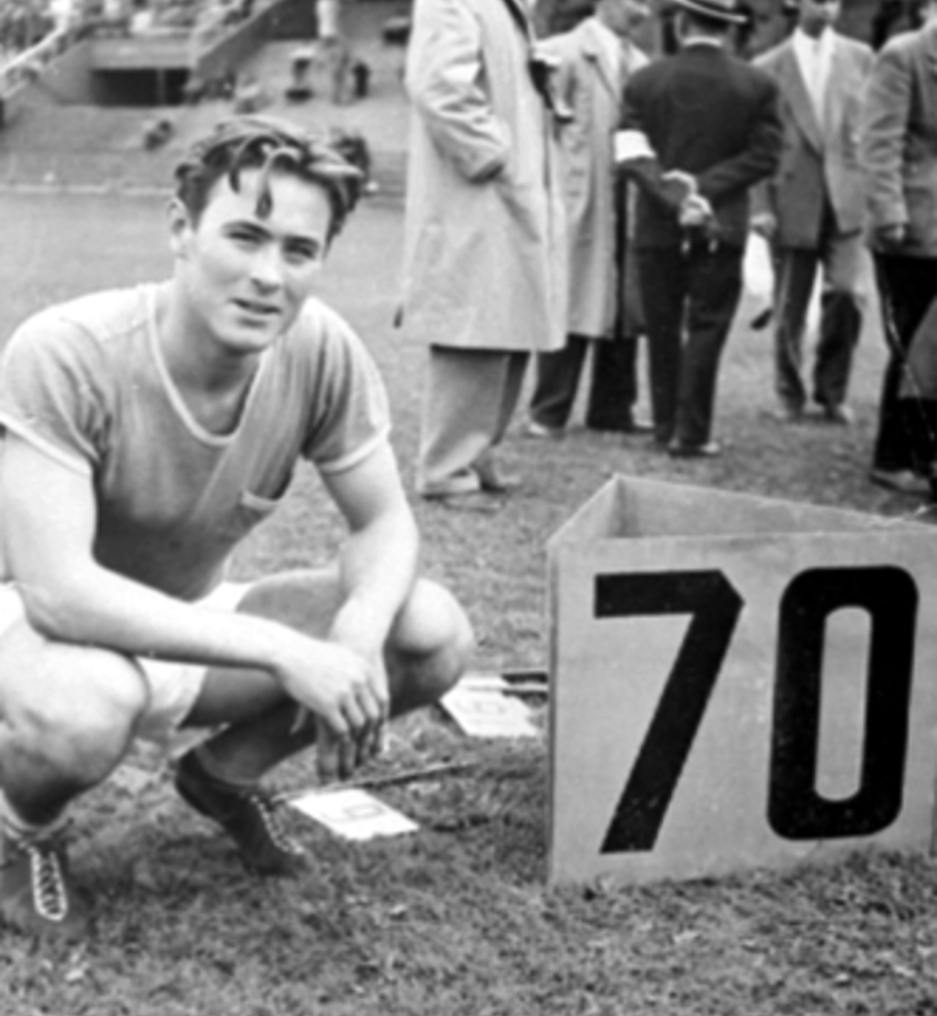
Egil Danielsen, 1953

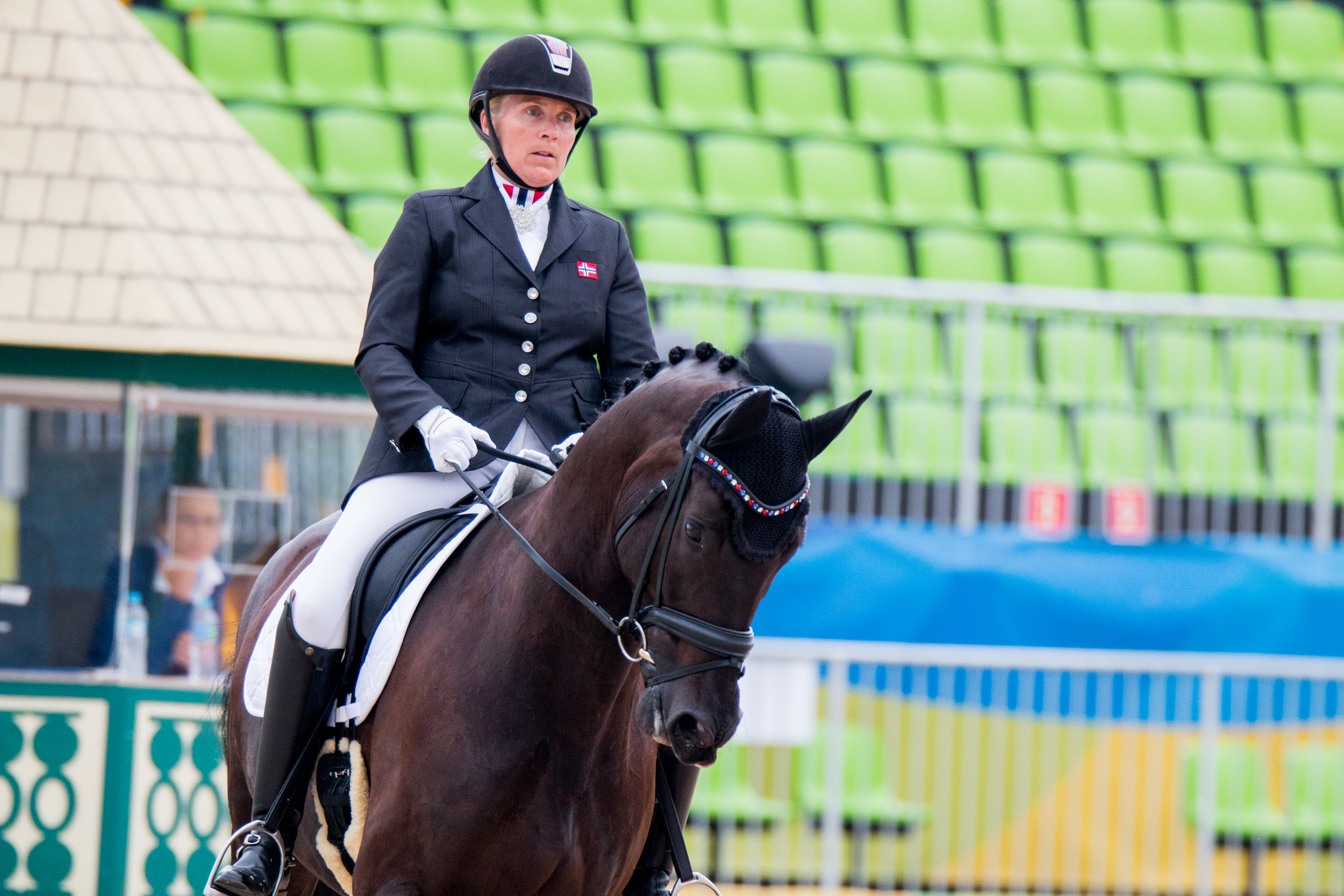
Ann Cathrin Lübbe, 2016

- Olaf Johannessen (1890–1977), sports shooter, competed at the 1924 Summer Olympics
- Sverre Sørsdal (1900–1996), boxer, silver and bronze medallist at the 1920 & 1924 Summer Olympics
- Egil Danielsen (1933–2019), Javelin thrower, gold medalist, at the 1956 Summer Olympics
- Ivar Eriksen (born 1942), former speed skater, team silver medallist at the 1968 Winter Olympics
- Terje Kojedal (born 1957), former footballer with 230 club caps and 66 for Norway
- Erik Kristiansen (born 1963), former ice hockey player
- Jon Inge Kjørum (born 1965), a former ski jumper, bronze medallist at the 1988 Winter Olympics
- Vegard Skogheim (born 1966), former footballer with over 400 club caps and 13 for Norway
- Kamilla Gamme (born 1969), diver
- Ann Cathrin Lübbe (born 1971), Paralympic equestrian for Norway
- Irene Dalby (born 1971), former top swimmer and three-time Olympian
- Jan Frode Andersen (born 1972), tennis player
- Audun Grønvold (1976–2025), freestyle skier, bronze medallist at the 2010 Winter Olympics
- Thorstein Helstad (born 1977), footballer with 448 club caps and 38 for Norway
- Kristin Bekkevold (born 1977), footballer, team gold medallist at the 2000 Summer Olympics
- Atle Gulbrandsen (born 1979), racing driver
- Even Wetten (born 1982), former speed skater
- Patrick Thoresen (born 1983), professional ice hockey player
- Petter Vaagan Moen (born 1984), footballer with 376 club caps and 9 for Norway
- Marius Holtet (born 1984), retired professional ice hockey forward
- Marcus Pedersen (born 1990), footballer with over 250 club caps and 9 for Norway
- Christian Krognes (born 1990), racing driver

== See also ==
- List of towns and cities in Norway
