= Thorstein Hiortdahl =

Norwegian chemist, mineralogist and politician (1839–1925)

Thorstein Hallager Hiortdahl (4 May 1839 – 29 October 1925) was a Norwegian chemist, mineralogist and politician.

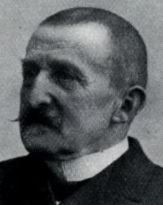
Thorstein Hiortdahl

== Biography ==
He was born in Bergen as a son of merchant Samuel Baar Hiortdahl (1807–1863) and Augusta Jacobine Hallager (1814–1892). In September 1869 he married Anna Karine Nilson Hals (1847–1908).

He finished his secondary education in 1857 at Bergen Cathedral School, and enrolled in medicine studies at the University of Christiania (now University of Oslo). In 1861 he defected, fascinated by the field of chemistry. He instead studied chemistry, mineralogy and crystallography; from 1864 to 1865 in Paris. He was behind the term partial isomorphy. The mineral hiortdahlite, which was first discovered at Langesundsfjorden in Larvik, was named after him.

He was a research fellow from 1866 and an associate professor from 1868 to 1872. From 1872 to 1918 he was a professor. During this period, from 1887 to 1892, he was the dean of the Faculty of Mathematics and Natural Sciences. He was succeeded by Eyvind Bødtker in the professor chair.

He wrote several books, and his textbooks were reprinted several times. He also contributed to the biographical dictionary Norsk biografisk leksikon. Hiortdahl was a co-founder of the Norwegian Chemical Society in 1893, and chaired the society from 1906 to 1912. When stepping down he became an honorary member. He also taught chemistry at the Norwegian Military College from 1868 to 1912, chaired the supervising committee for the Higher College of Agriculture at Aas from 1881 to 1896, and was also a member of Kristiania city council from 1883 to 1892. He was decorated as a Commander of the Order of St. Olav in 1911, and as a Knight of the Order of the Polar Star. He died in 1925 at Oslo.

== Select works ==
- Kortfattet Lærebog i Chemie (1870)
- Begyndelsesgrundene af den kvalitative analyse (1871)
- Fremstilling af kemiens historie (1906)
- Justus Liebig (1920)
