= Edvard Sylou-Creutz =

Norwegian classical pianist and composer (1881–1945)

- Born: Edvard Kreutz; 7 May 1881; Kristiania
- Died: 11 May 1945 (aged 64); Oslo
- Burial place: Vestre gravlund, Oslo
- Other names: Edvard Sylow-Kreutz; Edvard Sylou Kreutz
- Occupations: Pianist, composer, music critic, piano teacher, propagandist, program director
- Years active: 1910–1945
- Known for: Pianist in early radio, Nazi collaborator
- Political party: Nasjonal Samling
- Spouse(s): Signe Sylou-Creutz, née Jonson
- Children: 2

Edvard Sylou-Creutz (7 May 1881 – 11 May 1945) was a Norwegian classical pianist, composer and radio personality, who was especially active in Nazi-controlled radio in Germany and occupied Norway between March 1940 and the autumn of 1942.

== Pre-World War II life and career ==
Born in Kristiania (present-day Oslo) and named Edvard Kreutz, he changed his surname in the early 1900s. Initially, he used "Sylow-Kreutz" and "Sylou Kreutz" interchangeably. He was however sued by Colonel Carl Christian Weinwich Sylow in 1911, who claimed that he did not have the right to use the Sylow family name. Kristiania City Court concluded the case on 2 October 1911, with the verdict being that, according to the Norwegian name law, he could not use the Sylow name. The court found that he would however be allowed to use the name Sylou, which he claimed had been the surname of an early 19th-century ancestor who had emigrated to Norway.

He studied in Norway under the supervision of Agathe Backer-Grøndahl, Catharinus Elling and Iver Holter, and also for several years abroad, in Berlin, Germany, and Vienna, Austria-Hungary. He made his concert debut in 1910, went on nationwide tours in his early career, and was a music critic for the newspaper Morgenbladet from 1919. He also toured in France, giving concerts in Paris. Sylou-Creutz and his wife Signe Jonson had two sons, born in 1908 and 1910. Before World War II he worked as a pianist and composer, writing songs and piano pieces. He had been involved in the pioneer years of Norwegian radio in the 1920s. He accompanied the vocals of Dagny Schelderup in one of the earliest broadcasts of Kristiania Broadcasting on 12 April 1923, the first ever concert in Norwegian radio, featuring music by among others the Norwegian composers Edvard Grieg, Giacomo Puccini and Christian Sinding. Among the other artists Sylou-Creutz collaborated with as an accompanist was the renowned Norwegian opera singer Kirsten Flagstad. In 1936 Sylou-Creutz joined the Norwegian Society of Composers, and from 1934 to 1939, he taught the piano at the Oslo Conservatory of Music. Early on in his career, Sylou-Creutz offered private piano lessons in his home in Pilestredet, Oslo.

== Wartime collaboration ==
Sylou-Creutz was a member of the Fascist party Nasjonal Samling. In March 1940 he applied for a job in radio broadcasts from Germany to Norway, and he was hired as program presenter and news reader, based in Bremen. These broadcasts were propagandistic, and started on 1 April 1940, having been preceded by German broadcasts to Sweden from 20 November 1939 and to Denmark from January 1940. Sylou-Creutz worked anonymously in this job. The aim of the German broadcasts was to sway the generally pro-British Norwegian public opinion in favour of Germany, at which the broadcasts were not successful.

Syloud-Creutz continued his broadcasts after the German invasion of Norway on 9 April 1940. In the second half of April, the broadcasts switched from conveying German views on Norway (and often omitting Norway altogether, in favor of other war news) to being responses to British propaganda news. This shift was especially caused by the speech made by J. H. Marshall-Cornwall on 13 April, which called for Norwegian sabotage against the Germans. Sylou-Creutz also lamented the absence of German-friendly Victor Mogens as a foreign news commentator in Norwegian radio. Mogens had been pressured to resign in 1936.

By late April and early May 1940, preparations were made to close the Germany-based broadcasts to Norway, and instead make use of the Norwegian Broadcasting Corporation. Sylou-Creutz moved to Norway in early June after his last broadcast on German soil, and continued his career in Norway. Via contacts in the German Reichskommissariat Norwegen (which was the highest authority over the Broadcasting Corporation), Sylou-Creutz also managed to see his music get a lot of airtime.

On 28 September 1940, the Nazis took more control over the Norwegian Broadcasting Corporation; the pre-war director Olav Midttun was fired, and Edvard Sylou-Creutz and Eyvind Mehle were installed as program directors. Sylou-Creutz was also responsible for music. While being program directors, Mehle and Sylou-Creutz were subordinates of commissary president Wilhelm Frimann Koren Christie. There was a considerable rivalry and antagonism between Christie and Mehle, Christie and administrative director Carl Bødtker, and to a lesser degree between Mehle and Sylou-Creutz. Among other things, Mehle and Sylou-Creutz bickered over the right to the largest office. More importantly however, Mehle and Sylou-Creutz were on the same side in that they were German-friendly. By December 1941, reports of the internal quarrels involving Sylou-Creutz had reached the Norwegian-language American newspaper Nordisk Tidende, which described them as a "showdown between the Germans' errand boys".

In 1940 Sylou-Creutz made announcements stating that Jewish music should be banned from Norwegian airwaves and all performers should also be members of Nasjonal Samling. Among the conflicts Sylou-Creutz was involved with during his time as program director, was in connection with the radio broadcasting of church services. Sylou-Creutz demanded to be informed in advance of who would speak at the services, and to be given a veto. In 1941 this led to a conflict between the Church of Norway and the Nazi-led Norwegian Broadcasting Corporation, with increasing attempts at censorship from the Nazi authorities and boycotts from the priests. By the fall of 1941, the German occupational authorities had confiscated the radios from all Norwegians who were not members of Nasjonal Samling. This increased the boycott of the radio broadcasts by the priests.

Sylou-Creutz, having failed in his attempt at making performing in the radio a legal obligation for Norwegian artists, on 27 August 1942 banned six artists belonging to the concert company Brødrene Hals' Konsertbyrå from renting the Aulaen Hall of the University of Oslo. The artists banned were Robert Riefling, Jan Wølner, Frithjof Backer-Grøndahl, Amalie Christie, Rolf Størseth and Kari Glaser. The ban attracted great controversy, with the national music consultant Geirr Tveitt resigning in an 18-page protest letter to minister Gulbrand Lunde. Tveitt called Sylou-Creutz' actions "... madness... for it can lead to nothing but the destruction of all musical life." (Note: Norwegian: ...galskap... for det kan ikke annet enn føre til ødeleggelse av alt musikkliv. Voksø 1994: p. 260) The ban was reversed on 26 September 1942. Amidst towering intrigue, Sylou-Creutz was let go from the Broadcasting Corporation on 28 October 1942.

In connection with the 100th anniversary of the birth of the famous Norwegian composer Edvard Grieg on 15 June 1943 Sylou-Creutz was to hold the official Grieg concert in Stavanger. The city's orchestra had been offered 10-15,000 kr in public funds to perform with him, but declined. Sylou-Creutz ended up playing alone for an audience of 48 people, 40 of whom had been given free tickets. The paying members of the audience were asked to move from the gallery to the front benches. In comparison, non-Nazi artist Ivar Johnsen performed a single piece of Grieg's music in the park Fornøyelsesparken in Stavanger in storming rain with an audience of between 1,000 and 2,000 people the same day. At yet another concert, organized by the Norwegian-German Society in Larvik on 23 November 1943, almost no audience attended the concert hall. Sylou-Creutz performed works by Grieg, Franz Schubert, Franz Liszt and Richard Wagner, as well several of his own compositions. The Nazi-censured newspaper Larvik Dagblad stated at the time that it was to Sylou-Creutz's credit "both as a human being and an artist" to be able to perform "under these circumstances".

Sylou-Creutz died on 11 May 1945 in Oslo, and was buried at the cemetery Vestre gravlund in Oslo on 18 May 1945.

In the post-war legal purge in Norway, a file on the late Sylou-Creutz was compiled by the Norwegian authorities. His widow, Signe Sylou-Creutz, was convicted of treason in June 1947, being fined 25,000 kr and ordered to pay a further 30,000 kr in damages by Oslo City Court.
