= Wilhelm Frimann Koren Christie (1885–1956) =

Norwegian Nazi collaborator (1885–1956)

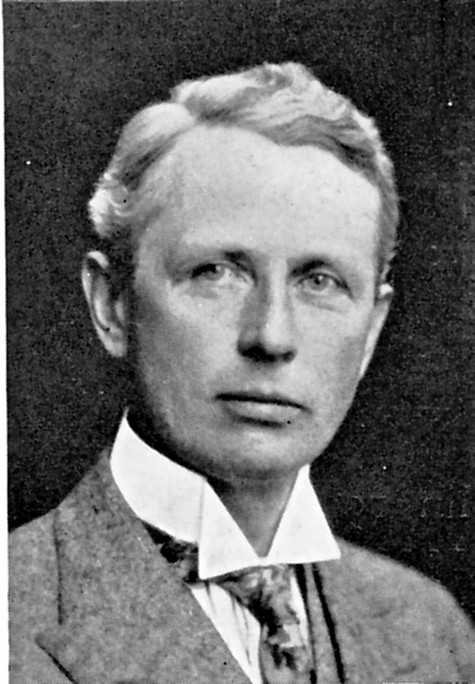
Wilhelm Frimann Koren Christie

Wilhelm Frimann Koren Christie (9 January 1885 – 1 December 1956) was a Norwegian jurist and Nazi collaborator. He is best known as director of the Norwegian Broadcasting Corporation for some time during the occupation of Norway by Nazi Germany.

Already in the 1930s he was the leader (Fører) of the Norwegian Fascist party Nasjonal Samling in Hedmark. He spent his professional life as a jurist in Hamar, where he co-founded the local branch of Nasjonal Samling in March 1933 together with Albert Wiesener and Einar Grill Fasting, among others. The party was relatively successful in the city, winning two city council seats in its first election outing. Christie was also a high-ranking freemason.

On 9 April 1940 Norway was invaded by Nazi Germany. Vidkun Quisling usurped the radio broadcaster in Oslo, the Norwegian Broadcasting Corporation (NRK), and performed a coup d'etat via radio. Christie travelled to Oslo on 10 April and worked for a few days as the secretary of Quisling's cabinet, although this cabinet soon became defunct. In September 1940, Christie was named by Gulbrand Lunde as commissary president of the Norwegian Broadcasting Corporation. He held his inaugural speech in the radio on 29 September. This was written by someone else and given to Christie minutes before airing—Christie had no experience with NRK whatsoever.

Christie was the boss of four sub-directors, and answered to Gulbrand Lunde who in turn answered to Josef Terboven. However, the director position of the Broadcasting Corporation, which before the war had belonged to Olav Midttun, was now shared between two of Christie's subordinates: Eyvind Mehle and Edvard Sylou-Creutz. Christie's task was mostly to deal with the foreign occupants, represented by the broadcasting department (German: Abteilung Rundfunk) of the Reichskommissariat Norwegen, which was also led by Terboven. Intrigues and disagreements soon arose, most importantly between Christie and Mehle. Christie was totally inexperienced with radio, whereas Mehle showed signs of paranoia and general mental instability. In addition, another subordinate, the director of administration Carl Bødtker was self-willed, considering himself the "real director". Christie managed to have him fired in June 1941. In December 1941 the towering intrigues led to Christie himself being fired. He instead became stipendiary magistrate of Oslo, a post that became vacant when stipendiary magistrate Harald Gram fled to Sweden—he was involved in resistance to the Nazi rule.

After the war, Christie lost his position, and was sentenced for treason as a part of the legal purge. He was released from custody on health grounds on 22 November 1946, and died in 1956 and was buried at Vestre gravlund.
