= Haakon Melhuus =

Norwegian meteorologist and weather presenter

Haakon Melhuus (born 2 August 1947) is a Norwegian meteorologist and weather presenter.

He was born in Hamar, and grew up in Furnes, Skjåk, Melhus, and Ørland. He finished his secondary education in Trondheim in 1967, and after one year of compulsory military service he enrolled at the University of Oslo. He graduated with the cand.real. degree in 1976, and after taking the pedagogical seminary in 1977 he worked briefly as a science teacher in Lørenskog Municipality.

Melhuus was hired in the Norwegian Meteorological Institute in 1977. After several stations around the country he was hired in the weather forecast department at Blindern in 1986. Between 1988 and 2013 he was a prime time weather presenter for the Norwegian Broadcasting Corporation.

He resides at Sofiemyr.
