= Eyvind Mehle =

Norwegian media scholar and broadcaster

Eyvind Mehle (13 September 1895 – 15 July 1945) was a Norwegian radio personality, media professor and Nazi collaborator.

== Background ==
He was born as Eyvind Mæhle, but changed his last name in 1930. He was hired in 1925 in Kringkastingsselskapet, the first broadcaster of Norwegian radio. One of his specialities were half-hour lectures in the form of travel descriptions. He later joined the Norwegian Fascist party Nasjonal Samling in its first year of existence, 1933, and served as its press spokesperson for some years.

On 9 April 1940 Norway was invaded by Nazi Germany, and a German occupation followed. On 25 September 1940, Mehle was named as director of verbal programs in Norwegian Broadcasting Corporation radio. As one of two program directors, the other being Edvard Sylou-Creutz, Mehle was considered as the successor of pre-war broadcasting director Olav Midttun, despite being a subordinate of commissary president Wilhelm Frimann Koren Christie.

This command chain did not work well. Although there was some rivalry between Mehle and Sylou-Crantz, the most severe rivalry was between Mehle and Christie. To start with, Mehle had to hand Christie his inaugural speech on 29 September, because Christie had limited knowledge of the Norwegian Broadcasting Corporation. In a broader context, as Nazis, Mehle was a Germanophile Hitler supporter whereas Christie was a more Norwegian-nationalistic Quisling supporter. In addition, Christie's freemasonry caused resentment. Mehle intrigued by pitting Christie against the broadcasting department (German: Abteilung Rundfunk) of the Reichskommissariat Norwegen. He also treated his own subordinates badly; he threatened employees with a gun on numerous occasions, and showed signs of paranoia and general mental instability.

== Final years and death ==
In the spring of 1941, Mehle became leader (Führer) of the Nasjonal Samling party chapter at the Broadcasting Corporation. After a while, however, the personal antagonisms led to him seeking another job. He was appointed as professor of media studies at the Nazi-occupied University of Oslo. Since late 1943 no tuition or teaching had taken place at the University, only research.

Around the end of World War II in Norway in May 1945, Mehle fled to Sweden. He drowned there later in 1945.

== See also ==
- List of fugitives from justice who disappeared
