= Edward Isak Hambro =

Norwegian judge and legal scholar

Edward Isak Hambro (26 December 1851 – 1936) was a Norwegian judge and legal scholar.

== Personal life ==
He was born in Christiania as a son of Christian Fredrik Hambro and Stine Bødtker. On the maternal side he was a nephew of B. A. Bødtker. On the paternal side he was a first cousin of Edvard Isak Hambro Bull and the educator Edvard Isak Hambro, and a first cousin once removed of the British banker Charles Joachim Hambro. His paternal grandfather was a Danish Jew who had migrated to Norway in 1810.

In August 1881 in Fet married his second cousin Julie Sejersted Bødtker. He thus became a brother-in-law of Major General Carl Fredrik Johannes Bødtker.

== Career ==
He finished his secondary education in 1869, and first studied philology, then jurisprudence from 1873. He graduated from the Royal Frederick University in 1875 with the cand.jur. degree. He worked as a lawyer and public jurist before being named as an assessor (judge) in Kristiania City Court in 1891. From 1910 to 1921 he was an assessor in the Supreme Court of Norway.

He also worked as a lecturer at the university, notably in Roman law. Academic works in this field include Omrids av den romerske civilproces (1887), Den romerske obligationsrets specielle del (1921), Den romerske tingsret (1921), Den romerske familie- og arveret (1923) and Om nogle med forbud beslegtede retsmidler i den romerske ret (1924). He wrote numerous other books, and contributed to the journals Norsk Retstidende and Tidsskrift for Retsvidenskap.

He served in Kristiania city council from 1902 to 1907. He died in 1936.
