= Eyvind Bødtker =

Norwegian chemist (1867–1932)

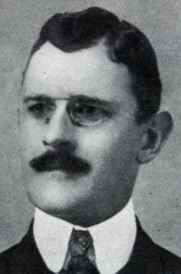
Eyvind Bødtker.

Eyvind Bødtker (5 August 1867 – 24 November 1932) was a Norwegian chemist. He spent most of his career at the University of Kristiania, where he was a professor from 1918.

== Personal life ==
He was born in Trondhjem as a son of physician Fredrik Waldemar Bødtker (1824–1901) and Sophie Jenssen (1830–1898). He was the brother of theatre critic Sigurd Bødtker, a second cousin of military officer Carl Fredrik Johannes Bødtker, log driving manager Ragnvald Bødtker and County Governor Eivind Bødtker, and a second cousin once removed of banker and art collector Johannes Sejersted Bødtker and radio personality Carl Bødtker. His mother was a daughter of landowner Anthon Petersen Jenssen, and as such Bødtker was a grandson of Matz Jenssen, nephew of Jens Nicolai, Hans Peter and Lauritz Dorenfeldt Jenssen and first cousin of Christian Mathias, Anthon Mathias and Lauritz Jenssen. Eyvind Bødtker did not marry.

== Career ==
He originally took education as a pharmacist, graduating in 1887, but also studied a wide array of fields of chemistry. He eventually specialized in "benzol homologs" and alicyclic compounds. He spent much time abroad, and studied under Carl Remigius Fresenius (Wiesbaden), Walther Nernst (University of Göttingen), Küster (Clausthal University of Technology), Albin Haller (University of Paris, Sorbonne) and at the Institut Pasteur. Throughout his career, he mostly published in German and French periodicals. He took the dr.philos. degree at the University of Leipzig in 1891, and was then hired as an associate professor at the University of Kristiania. From 1910 he also worked at the Norwegian Military Academy, and from 1913 at the Norwegian Military College. He succeeded Thorstein Hiortdahl in the professor chair at the University of Kristiania in 1918. From 1920 he also chaired the Norwegian Chemical Society. He died in 1932.
