= Johannes Sejersted Bødtker =

Norwegian banker, art collector and patron of the arts

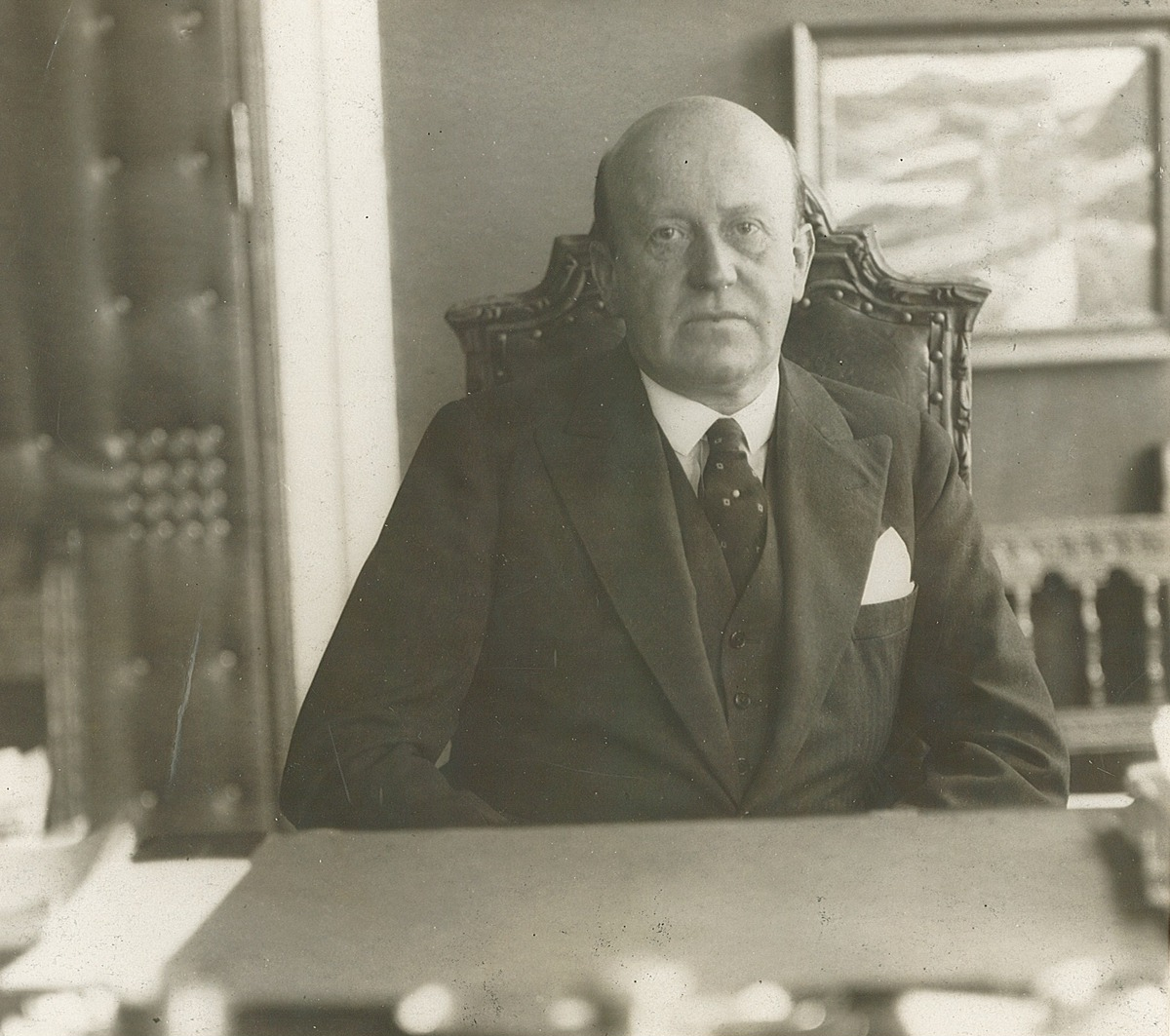
- Sejersted Bødtker in the 1930s.
- Born: 29 May 1879
- Died: 17 January 1963 (aged 83)
- Occupation: Banker
- Known for: Art collector and patron of the arts
- Parent: Carl Fredrik Johannes Bødtker
- Relatives: Carl Bødtker (brother)
- Awards: Order of St. Olav; Order of the British Empire; Order of the Dannebrog; Order of the Polar Star; Order of the White Rose

Johannes Mathias Sejersted Bødtker CBE (29 May 1879 – 17 January 1963) was a Norwegian banker, art collector and patron of the arts.

== Early and personal life ==
Bødtker was born in Kristiansand, as a son of Major General Carl Fredrik Johannes Bødtker and Karen Agathe Falck. He was a brother of radio personality Carl Bødtker, and nephew of log driving manager Ragnvald Bødtker and County Governor Eivind Bødtker, and a second cousin once removed of theatre critic Sigurd Bødtker and chemist Eyvind Bødtker.

He married Louise Beer in 1914. She died in 1919, and in 1921, Bødtker married Ingeborg Beer, Louise's sister. His wives were granddaughters of Anders Beer.

== Career ==
Bødtker was manager for Norsk Investment from 1917 to 1923, and for Andresens Bank in 1919, and from 1920 for the combined Forretningsbanken. He started his own banking company in 1923. Bødtker was a board member of several companies, including Union Co. from 1934, and Forsikringsselskapet Fram from 1937. He was a board member of Oslo Handelsstands Forening from 1921 to 1924, and Finland's Honorary Consul to Oslo from 1934 to 1958. He was a passionate art collector, and collected a number of paintings, by artists such as Reidar Aulie, J. C. Dahl, Kai Fjell, Per Krohg and Edvard Munch. Of his large collection of modern art, eight of the paintings were testamentary donated to the National Gallery. He was a board member of the National Theatre for many years. Norway was invaded and occupied by Nazi Germany in 1940, and because the National Theatre's board did not abide to the directions from the Nazi government, Bødtker, along with board members Harald Grieg, a publisher, and Francis Bull, a professor of literature were arrested in 1941. He was held at Grini concentration camp from August 1941 to July 1944.

== Awards ==
Sejersted Bødtker was decorated as a Knight, First Class of the Royal Norwegian Order of St. Olav in 1912. He was appointed Commander of the Order of the British Empire, the Danish Order of the Dannebrog, the Swedish Order of the Polar Star, and the Finnish Order of the White Rose.
