= Ragnvald Bødtker =

Norwegian engineer (1859–1946)

Ragnvald Bødtker (29 June 1859 – 22 March 1946) was a Norwegian engineer, known as the director of log driving in Halden Municipality for 42 years.

== Personal life ==
He was born in Overhalla Municipality as a son of district stipendiary magistrate Job Dischington Bødtker (1818-1889) and his wife Fredrikke Sophie Sejersted (1825-1872). He was the brother of military officer Carl Fredrik Johannes Bødtker and County Governor Eivind Bødtker, a second cousin of theatre critic Sigurd Bødtker and chemist Eyvind Bødtker and an uncle of banker and art collector Johannes Sejersted Bødtker and radio personality Carl Bødtker. In November 1887 he married Inger Marie Soot (1858–1939), a daughter of another log driving inspector.

== Career ==
The family moved to Tønsberg in 1861, and despite ill health he graduated from middle school. He then attended Trondhjem Technical School between 1878 and 1881. He worked as a road engineer from 1882 to 1883, and with mapping from 1883 to 1889. From 1890 to 1932 he was the director of log driving in the Halden Watershed. Several dams and canals were constructed during his period; the lakes Setten, Rødenessjøen, Femsjøen (twice), Øgderen, Ertevann, Øymarksjøen, Aspern and Ara were regulated. In 1907 the Tista Canal was finished. He was also a member of the executive committee of the municipal council of Halden Municipality. In 1932 he retired, and took on writing the history of log driving in Norway. This was released in two volumes, Norsk fløtnings historie inntil 1860 (1938) and Norsk fløtnings historie 1860 inntil 1943 (1945). Bødtker died in March 1946 in Oslo.
