= Sigurd Bødtker =

Norwegian theatre critic (1866–1928)

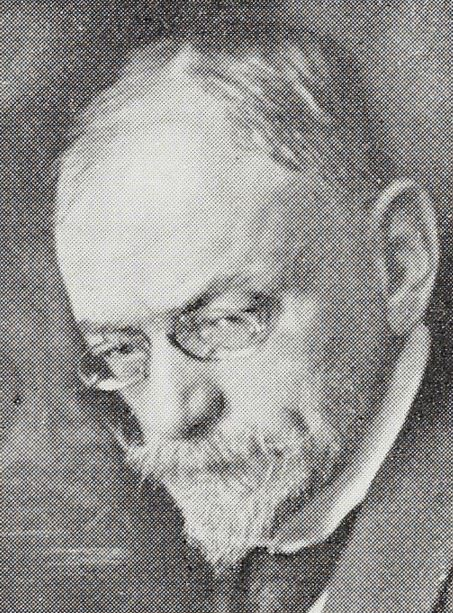
Sigurd Bødtker

Sigurd Bødtker (2 February 1866 – 6 March 1928) was a Norwegian theatre critic.

== Personal life ==
He was born in Trondhjem as a son of physician Fredrik Waldemar Bødtker (1824-1901) and Sophie Jenssen (1830-1898). He was the brother of chemist Eyvind Bødtker, a second cousin of military officer Carl Fredrik Johannes Bødtker, log driving manager Ragnvald Bødtker and County Governor Eivind Bødtker, and a second cousin once removed of banker and art collector Johannes Sejersted Bødtker and radio personality Carl Bødtker. His mother was a daughter of landowner Anthon Petersen Jenssen, and as such Bødtker was a grandson of Matz Jenssen, nephew of Jens Nicolai, Hans Peter and Lauritz Dorenfeldt Jenssen and first cousin of Christian Mathias, Anthon Mathias and Lauritz Jenssen.

He married Ingrid Blehr (1881–1959) in July 1901; they divorced in 1910. Through his wife's sister he was a brother-in-law of Gunnar Heiberg.

== Career ==
He finished his secondary education in 1884, and enrolled in law studies at the University of Kristiania. His 1888 literary debut, the poetry collection Elskov ('Love'), was ill-received. He was found guilty of "seduction", a breach of the by-laws of the University. The case went all the way to the Supreme Court of Norway, and he was relegated for one year. It was his first and last work of fiction, and he instead concentrated on studies for the rest of the period and graduated with the cand.jur. degree from the University of Kristiania in 1891.

In 1896, he was hired as a secretary in the Norwegian Ministry of the Interior. More importantly however, from the same year he worked as a theatre critic for the newspaper Morgenbladet. Then, after a period in Verdens Gang he followed Olaf Thommessen to the new newspaper Tidens Tegn. Bødtker worked for Tidens Tegn in two periods, intercepted by a brief tenure in Aftenposten. Bødtker did work as a secretary in the Norwegian Ministry of Agriculture from 1900 to 1903, but then became a full-time theatre critic—Norway's first. His critic pieces were later published in three volumes, the first two by Einar Skavlan in 1923 and 1924 and the last by Anton Rønneberg in 1929.

In 1905, Bødtker agitated for dissolution of the union between Norway and Sweden through a pamphlet. He died in March 1928 in Oslo.
