= Carl Fredrik Johannes Bødtker =

Norwegian military officer, teacher and writer

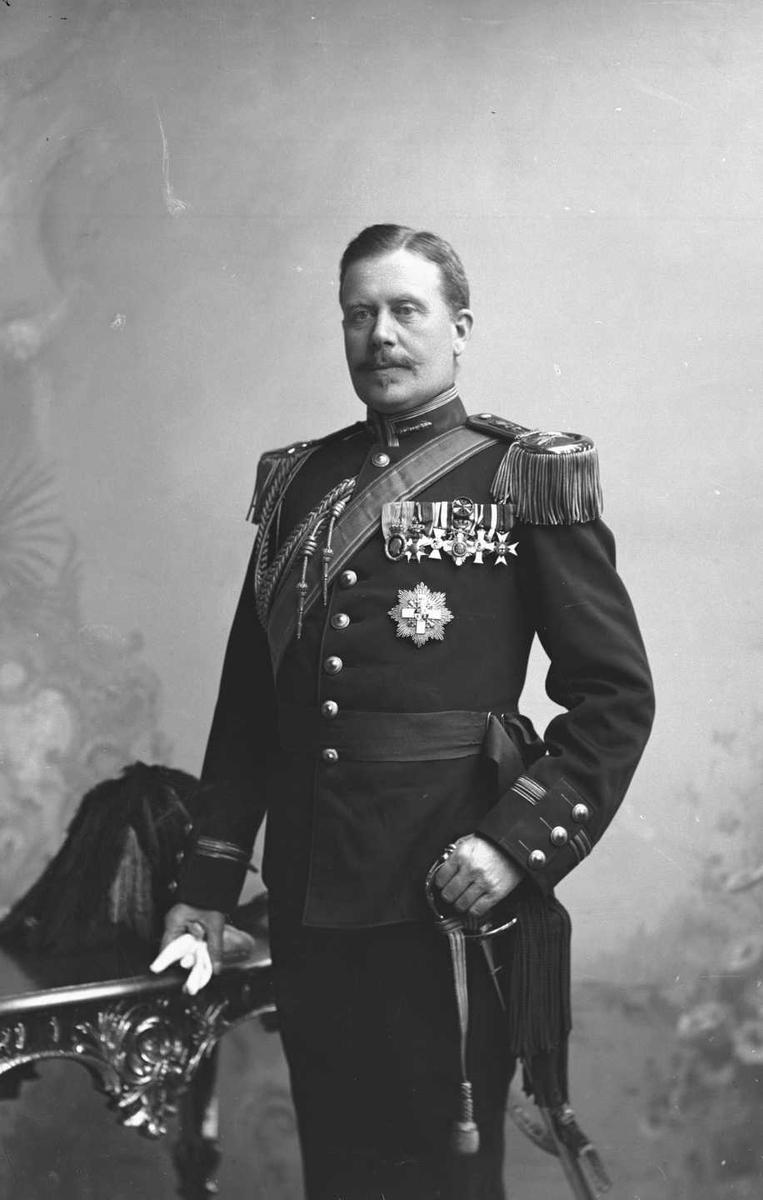
Carl Fredrik Johannes Bødtker

Carl Fredrik Johannes Bødtker (20 June 1851 – 22 January 1928) was a Norwegian military officer, teacher and writer.

== Personal life ==
Bødtker was born in Christiania, the son of district stipendiary magistrate Job Dischington Bødtker and his wife Fredrikke Sophie Sejersted. Bødtker had two brothers, log driving manager Ragnvald Bødtker and county governor Eivind Bødtker, and was second cousin to theatre critic Sigurd Bødtker and chemist Eyvind Bødtker. His sister Julie married the judge Edward Isak Hambro.

In April 1878 he married Karen Agathe Falck, a ship-owner's daughter from Tønsberg, at a ceremony in Nøtterø Municipality. The couple had two sons, banker and art collector Johannes Sejersted Bødtker, and radio personality Carl Fredrik Johannes Bødtker, Jr. Johannes married twice, to granddaughters of Anders Beer.

== Career ==
Bødtker embarked on a military career at a young age. He enrolled at the Military College, from where he graduated in 1875 before rising through the ranks as second lieutenant in 1876, premier lieutenant in 1877, captain in 1889, major in 1899 and lieutenant colonel in 1902. Most of his military career was spent in the artillery; he oversaw the construction of artillery (1893 to 1897) and managed the workshops of Norway's main arsenal (from 1890). He also taught at the Military College from 1893 to 1910, published several academic articles on artillery, and acted as an aide-de-camp to King Oscar II of Norway and Sweden from 1892 to 1905. He was thus a member of the Royal Swedish Academy of War Sciences. From 1910 until his retirement in 1919 Bødtker served as general inspector of the Norwegian field artillery, with the rank of major general.

Bødtker was for many years a prominent freemason, and was grand master of the Norwegian Order of Freemasons from 1923. He died in 1928.
