= Jevne (surname) =

Jevne is a surname. Notable people with the surname include:

- Erling Jevne (born 1966), Norwegian cross-country skier
- Jack Jevne (1892–1972), American screenwriter, actor, and World War I sergeant
- Tor Jevne (1928–2001), Norwegian footballer
