= Einar Grill Fasting =

Norwegian politician (1883–1958)

Einar Grill Fasting (25 October 1883 – 21 April 1958) was a Norwegian businessperson and Nazi politician.

In 1933 he co-founded the local branch of the Norwegian Fascist party Nasjonal Samling in Hamar. He became the city leader (Führer), whereas townsman Wilhelm Frimann Koren Christie became county leader. Compared to elsewhere in Norway, the party was relatively successful in Hamar, winning two city council seats in its first election outing. Fasting also chaired the local sports club Hamar IL from 1930 to 1934.

On 9 April 1940 Norway was invaded by Nazi Germany. During the subsequent occupation, Fasting was installed by the Germans as mayor of Hamar on 1 January 1941. In July 1941 he was installed as chairman of Hamar, Vang og Furnes Kommunale Kraftselskap.

After the Second World War, Fasting was removed from his positions, and was arrested in May 1945. In the post-war Norwegian legal purge he was tried for treason, and in Hamar City Court he was sentenced to nine years of prison in October 1946. His case was finally decided in the Supreme Court of Norway in December 1948, where his sentence was reduced to seven years. He died in 1958.
