= Carl Bødtker =

Norwegian engineer and radio personality

Carl Fredrik Johannes Bødtker (19 May 1886 – 5 February 1980) was a Norwegian engineer and radio personality.

== Early and personal life ==
He was born at Oscarsborg Fortress as a son of Major General Carl Fredrik Johannes Bødtker (1851–1928) and Karen Agathe Falck (1852–1932). He was the brother of banker and art collector Johannes Sejersted Bødtker, a nephew of log driving manager Ragnvald Bødtker and County Governor Eivind Bødtker and a second cousin of theatre critic Sigurd Bødtker and chemist Eyvind Bødtker.

Bødtker first followed in his father's footsteps, taking education as a machine engineer at Kristiania Technical School in 1906. In 1906 he was hired as controller at a cannon factory in Düsseldorf; from 1911 he worked at a steel works in the same city. He met his future wife, Anita Emily Möhlau (1889–1979) here and married her in 1914. In the same year he returned to Norway, and was hired at Norsk Hydro Rjukan.

== Media career ==
An avid amateur radio operator, Bødtker participated in the early broadcasting in Norway. The first radio program aired in December 1924, and Bødtker was the presenter. He especially became known as the host of the popular children's program Lørdagsbarnetimen; in this program he was nicknamed "Uncle Bødtker". He lost his job at Norsk Hydro due to downsizing around 1925, and then became a board member of Kringkastingselskapet from 1925 to 1930. In 1933 the Norwegian Broadcasting Corporation was established.

In 1940 Norway was invaded and subsequently occupied by Nazi Germany as a part of World War II. The Nazi occupants soon moved to cease normal activity at the Norwegian Broadcasting Corporation. In September 1940 the corporation was taken over by the newly created Norwegian Ministry of Culture and Enlightenment. As a part of a broader Nazification strategy, the directors were replaced, and Bødtker agreed to assume the position as director of administration. He was one of four sub-directors under commissary president Wilhelm Frimann Koren Christie, who in turn answered to the Minister of Culture and Enlightenment. Christie struggled with intrigues both internally and in relation to the Reichskommissariat Norwegen. Bødtker saw his opportunity and "neglected" Christie in daily affairs. He also enrolled in the Fascist party Nasjonal Samling to strengthen his position. Christie answered with scrutiny of Bødtker's economic affairs, and found some exaggerated costs for rent of cars, hotel rooms et cetera. This was enough to have Bødtker, who lacked a human network in Nasjonal Samling, fired in June 1941. At the same time he left the party. However, he was asked to return in October 1942, with Christie long gone. By that time the Norwegian Broadcasting Corporation had experienced severe hardships, as most of the listeners abruptly disappeared: radios had become prohibited in the autumn 1941 for everybody save members of Nasjonal Samling. Bødtker remained in his position until Victory in Europe Day, when the Nazi regime fell; he was arrested shortly thereafter.

As a part of the legal purge he was sentenced for Nazi collaboration. However, after a while it became clear that he had worked to help the Norwegian Broadcasting Corporation through a difficult time, and tried to resist Nazi German attempts of monetary exploitation of the company. Also his brother Johannes was imprisoned during the last years of the war. Nonetheless Bødtker maintained a low profile for the rest of his life and died in February 1980 in Ådal.
