= H. Jevne & Co. =

Defunct American grocery company based in Los Angeles

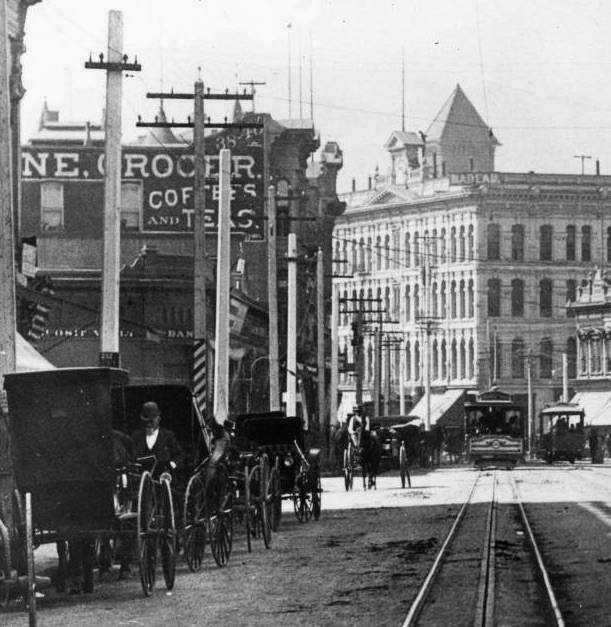
- View towards the south of the side of H. Jevne & Co. building around 1893–6.
- Type: Privately held company
- Industry: Groceries
- Founded: 1882
- Founder: Hans Jevne
- Defunct: 1941
- Fate: Closed after death of owner
- Headquarters: Los Angeles, United States
- Area served: California
- Key people: Hans Jevne and his son Jack Jevne
- Products: Groceries

H. Jevne & Company was an American grocery company based in Los Angeles. It was one of the leading grocers in the early evolution of the city. It was founded and operated by Hans Jevne (February 28, 1849 – May 6, 1927).

== History ==
In February, 1882, Norwegian immigrant Hans Jevne, left a partnership that he had had with his brother in Chicago, came to Los Angeles, and a few months later he opened a small grocery store in the Strelitz Block at what was then 38–40 North Spring Street (numbering changed to 136 N. Spring in 1890), between First and Franklin/Court, a demolished street. Leading business Harris Newmark wrote in his memoirs, "in less than no time, so to speak, the good housewives of the town were able to secure the rarest tidbits from all the markets of the world. Jevne, since his advent here, has been identified with the most important steps in the evolution of the city."

On June 21, 1896, Jevne moved to the Wilcox Building at the southeast corner of 2nd and Spring. In 1906–7, the H. Jevne & Co. Building was constructed at the southwest corner of 6th and Broadway, and is still standing, just next to the Los Angeles Theatre. According to the Los Angeles Times, it was said to be one of the finest grocery stores in the country. Jevne's closed the retail store around 1920, to concentrate on the wholesale business including manufacturingn bakery goods and confectionery.

Jevne produced olives, olive oil and different varieties of wines in La Crescenta, California, today a suburb on the northeast edge of Glendale.

Hans Jevne retired around 1926 and his son J. A. Jevne assumed the presidency of the company.

Hans Jevne was active in the Merchants & Manufacturers Association, the California Club, Los Angeles Athletic Club, the Los Angeles Country Club, the California Yacht Club, the Sunset Club and in the organization of the annual Fiesta de Los Angeles. He was for some years one of the directors of the First National Bank.

Company gallery
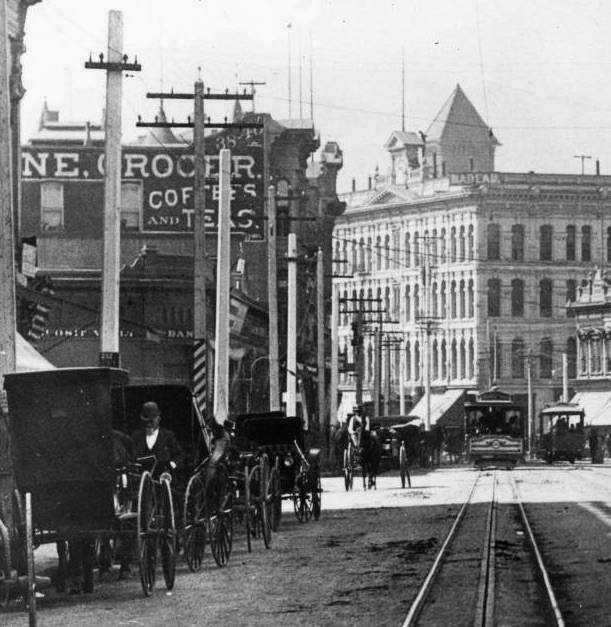
View towards the south of the side of H. Jevne & Co. ("ne Grocer Coffees and Teas") on N. Spring around 1893–6. At back, Hotel Nadeau at the corner of 1st St.

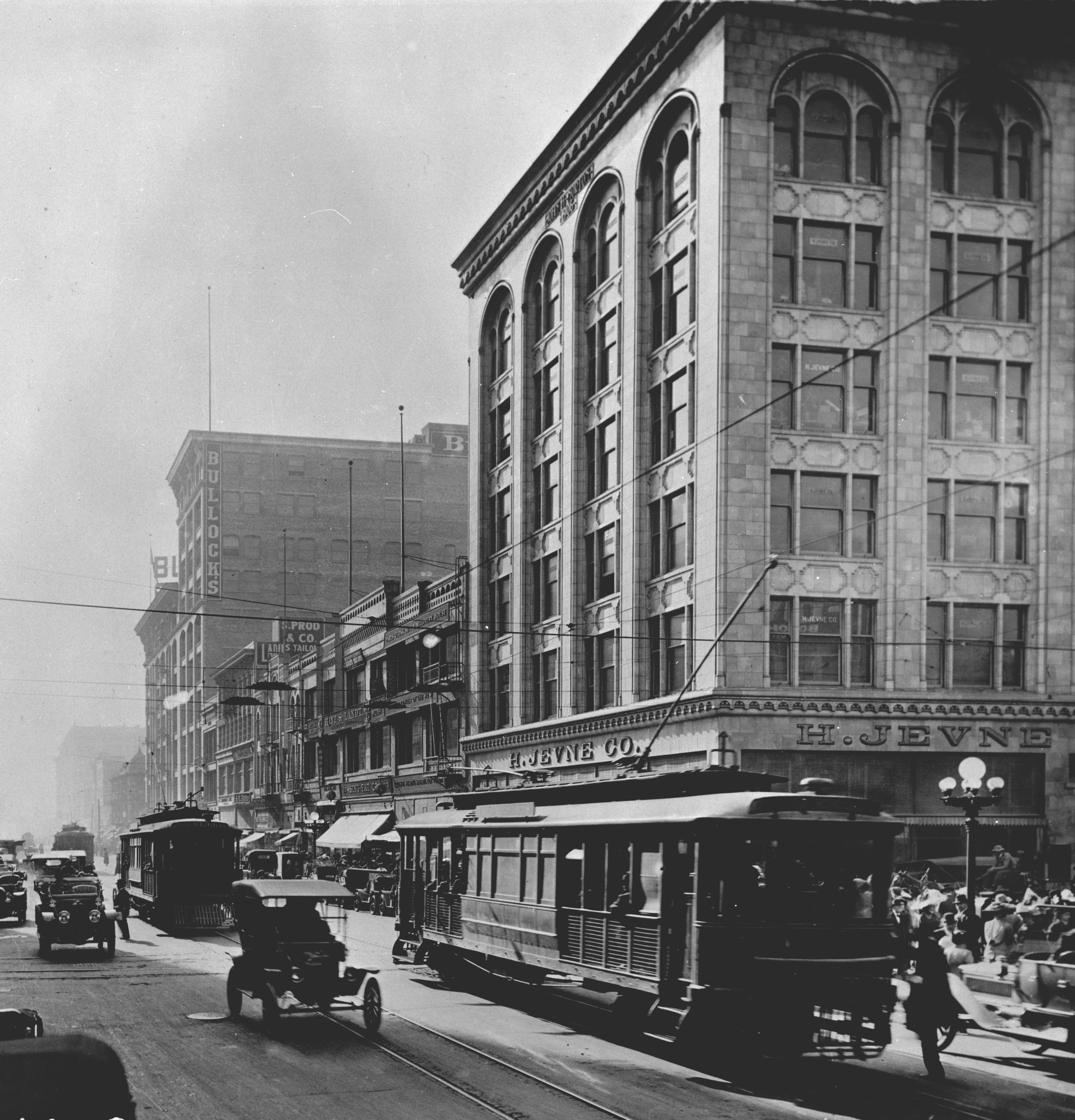
H. Jevne & Co. Building (right) at southwest corner of 6th and Broadway (Los Angeles), c.1915. Bullock's department store at back left

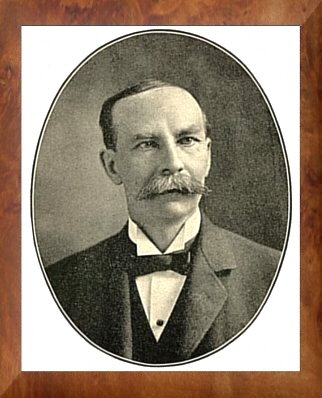
Hans Jevne
