= Norwegian Chemical Society =

Norwegian scientific organization

The Norwegian Chemical Society (Norwegian: Norsk kjemisk selskap) is a professional society in Norway for chemists. Formed in 1893, its purpose is to "promote the interest and understanding of chemistry and chemical technology".

Chair is Jørn H. Hansen, vice chair is Karina Mathisen and board members are Camilla Løhre, Stein Helleborg and Magne Sydnes.
