= Klæbu Municipality =

Former municipality in Trøndelag, Norway

Klæbu Municipality Klæbu kommune
- Former municipality
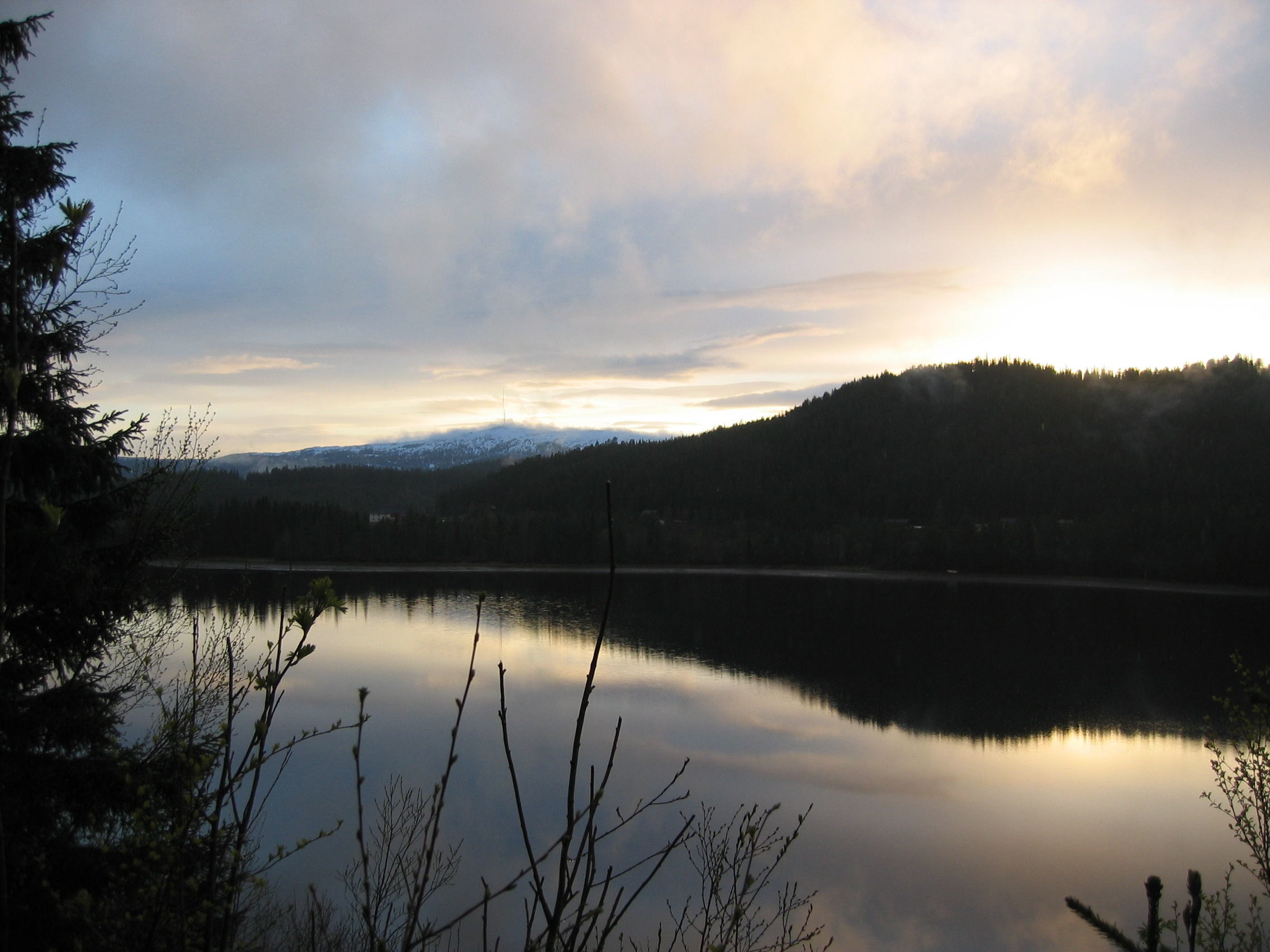

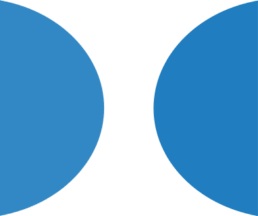
- Flag Coat of arms

- Trøndelag within Norway

- Klæbu within Trøndelag
- Coordinates: 63°16′34″N 10°30′51″E
- Country: Norway
- County: Trøndelag
- District: Trondheim Region
- Established: 1 January 1838
  - Created as: Formannskapsdistrikt
- Disestablished: 1 January 2020
  - Succeeded by: Trondheim Municipality
- Administrative centre: Klæbu

Government
  - Mayor (2015-2019): Kirsti Tømmervold (Ap)

Area (upon dissolution)
  - Total: 186.35 km^{2} (71.95 sq mi)
  - Land: 174.80 km^{2} (67.49 sq mi)
  - Water: 11.55 km^{2} (4.46 sq mi) 6.2%
  - Rank: #337 in Norway
- Highest elevation: 816.7 m (2,679 ft)

Population (2019)
  - Total: 6,076
  - Rank: #171 in Norway
  - Density: 32.6/km^{2} (84/sq mi)
  - Change (10 years): ▲ +7.8%
- Demonym: Klæbygg

Official language
  - Norwegian form: Bokmål
- Time zone: UTC+01:00 (CET)
  - Summer (DST): UTC+02:00 (CEST)
- ISO 3166 code: NO-5030

Klæbu is a former municipality in Trøndelag county, Norway. It existed from 1838 until its dissolution in 2020 when it was incorporated into the neighboring Trondheim Municipality. It was located in the southern part of the Trondheim Region, about 20 kilometres (12 mi) south of the city of Trondheim. The administrative center was the village of Klæbu. The other major village in Klæbu Municipality was Tanem.

At the time of its dissolution in 2020, the 186-square-kilometre (72 sq mi) municipality was the 337th largest by area out of the 422 municipalities in Norway. Klæbu Municipality was the 171st most populous municipality in Norway with a population of 6,076. The municipality's population density was 32.6 inhabitants per square kilometre (84/sq mi) and its population had increased by 7.8% over the previous 10-year period.

Even though agriculture was traditionally the main industry for Klæbu, the municipality most recently functioned more as a commuter town of Trondheim, where many of Klæbu's inhabitants worked or attended school.

== General information ==
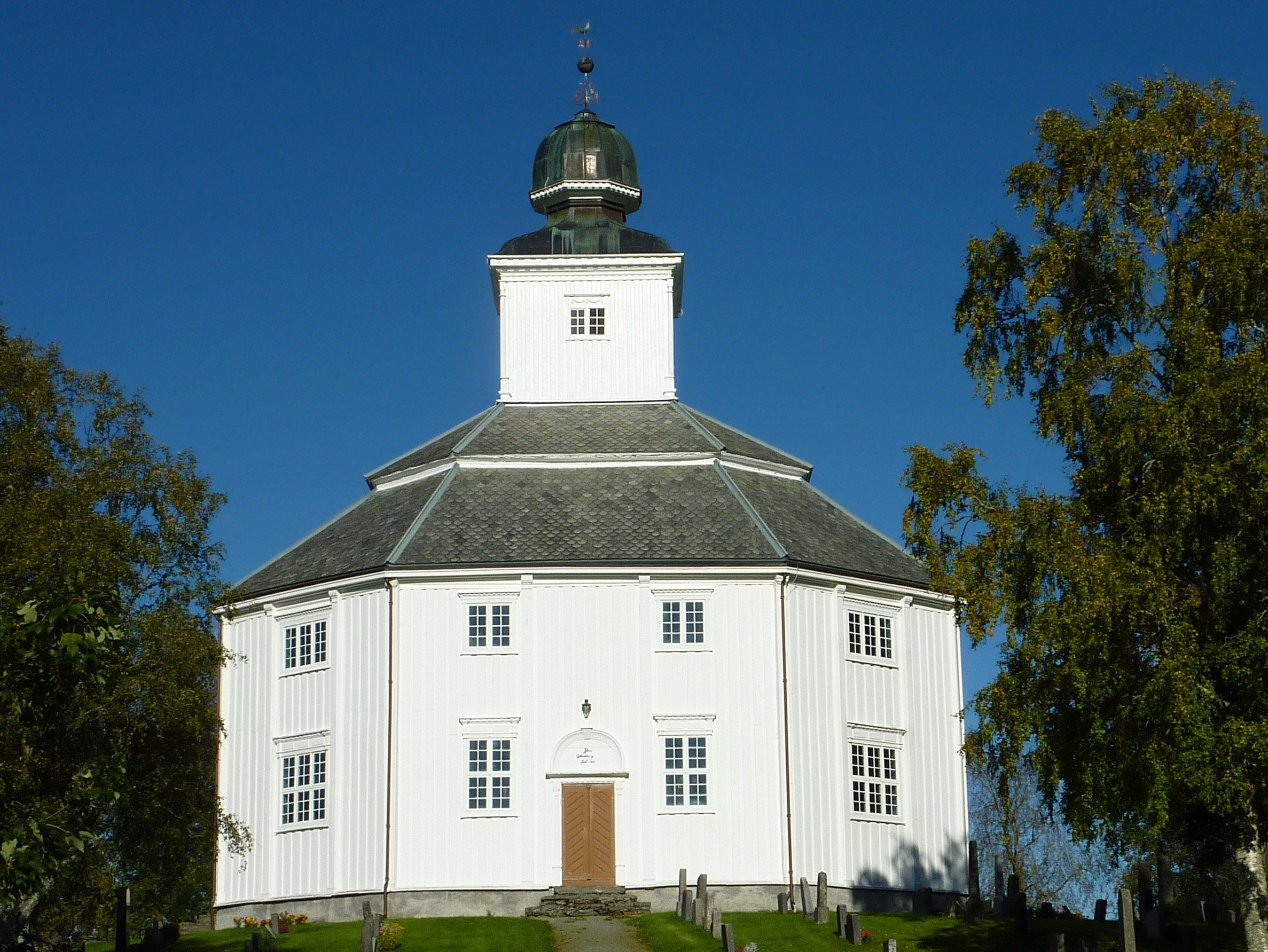
Klæbu Church

The municipality of Klæbu was established on 1 January 1838 (see formannskapsdistrikt law). On 1 January 1899, the small northwestern part of Klæbu (population: 533) was separated from Klæbu to form the new Tiller Municipality.

On 1 January 2018, the municipality switched from the old Sør-Trøndelag county to the new Trøndelag county.

On 1 January 2020, Klæbu Municipality merged with the neighboring Trondheim Municipality to the north.

=== Name ===
The municipality (originally the parish) is named after the old Klæbu farm (Old Norse: Kleppabú) since the first Klæbu Church was built there. The first element is the plural genitive case of kleppr which means "rocky hill". The last element is bú which means "rural district". The district/parish has a lot of small rocky hills.

=== Coat of arms ===
The coat of arms was granted on 8 July 1983 and it was in use until 1 January 2020 when the municipality was dissolved. The official blazon is "Argent, flaunches azure" (Norwegian: I sølv to buede blå flanker). This means the arms have a field (background) that has a tincture of argent which means it is commonly colored white, but if it is made out of metal, then silver is used. Each side of the arms have blue flaunches. The arms symbolize the Trangfossen waterfall in the Nidelva river, which is now the deepest canyon in Norway measuring 56 metres (184 ft). The river has been of great importance for the local development, for agriculture and hydroelectricity generation, hence the use of the waterfall as a typical symbol for the municipality. The waterfall is no longer visible as that part of the river became part of Bjørsjøen lake after the building of the dam at Hyttfossen. The arms were designed by Einar H. Skjervold.

=== Churches ===
The Church of Norway had one parish (sokn) within Klæbu Municipality. It is part of the Heimdal prosti (deanery) in the Diocese of Nidaros.

Churches in Klæbu Municipality
Parish (sokn)	Church name	Location of the church	Year built
Klæbu	Klæbu Church	Klæbu	1790
Klæbu	Vassfjell Chapel	Vassfjellet mountain	1974

== Geography ==
The Nidelva river flowed through Klæbu Municipality. The river was a large source of hydroelectric power with a total of 3 power stations within the municipal borders. The river runs north from the lake Selbusjøen. The mountain Vassfjellet was located along the western border with Melhus Municipality. The highest point in the municipality was the 816.7-metre (2,679 ft) tall mountain Kråkfjellet.

The landlocked municipality of Klæbu had three municipalities that bordered it: Melhus Municipality to the west and south, Selbu Municipality to the east, and Trondheim Municipality to the north.

== Media ==
The newspaper KlæbuPosten is published in Klæbu.

== Government ==
While it existed, Klæbu Municipality was responsible for primary education (through 10th grade), outpatient health services, senior citizen services, welfare and other social services, zoning, economic development, and municipal roads and utilities. The municipality was governed by a municipal council of directly elected representatives. The mayor was indirectly elected by a vote of the municipal council. The municipality was under the jurisdiction of the Sør-Trøndelag District Court and the Frostating Court of Appeal. Waste management was after 2003 provided by the inter-municipal agency Envina.

=== Municipal council ===
The municipal council (Kommunestyre) of Klæbu Municipality is made up of 23 representatives that are elected to four year terms. The tables below show the historical composition of the council by political party.

Klæbu kommunestyre 2015–2019
Party name (in Norwegian)	Number of representatives
Labour Party (Arbeiderpartiet)	9
Progress Party (Fremskrittspartiet)	2
Green Party (Miljøpartiet De Grønne)	1
Conservative Party (Høyre)	3
Centre Party (Senterpartiet)	3
Socialist Left Party (Sosialistisk Venstreparti)	2
Liberal Party (Venstre)	3
Total number of members:	23

Klæbu kommunestyre 2011–2015
Party name (in Norwegian)	Number of representatives
Labour Party (Arbeiderpartiet)	8
Progress Party (Fremskrittspartiet)	3
Conservative Party (Høyre)	5
Centre Party (Senterpartiet)	3
Socialist Left Party (Sosialistisk Venstreparti)	2
Liberal Party (Venstre)	2
Total number of members:	23

Klæbu kommunestyre 2007–2011
Party name (in Norwegian)	Number of representatives
Labour Party (Arbeiderpartiet)	6
Progress Party (Fremskrittspartiet)	5
Conservative Party (Høyre)	3
Christian Democratic Party (Kristelig Folkeparti)	1
Centre Party (Senterpartiet)	3
Socialist Left Party (Sosialistisk Venstreparti)	3
Liberal Party (Venstre)	2
Total number of members:	23

Klæbu kommunestyre 2003–2007
Party name (in Norwegian)	Number of representatives
Labour Party (Arbeiderpartiet)	5
Progress Party (Fremskrittspartiet)	4
Conservative Party (Høyre)	3
Christian Democratic Party (Kristelig Folkeparti)	2
Centre Party (Senterpartiet)	1
Socialist Left Party (Sosialistisk Venstreparti)	8
Total number of members:	23

Klæbu kommunestyre 1999–2003
Party name (in Norwegian)	Number of representatives
Labour Party (Arbeiderpartiet)	6
Progress Party (Fremskrittspartiet)	2
Conservative Party (Høyre)	4
Christian Democratic Party (Kristelig Folkeparti)	2
Centre Party (Senterpartiet)	2
Socialist Left Party (Sosialistisk Venstreparti)	6
Liberal Party (Venstre)	1
Total number of members:	23

Klæbu kommunestyre 1995–1999
Party name (in Norwegian)	Number of representatives
Labour Party (Arbeiderpartiet)	7
Progress Party (Fremskrittspartiet)	1
Conservative Party (Høyre)	5
Christian Democratic Party (Kristelig Folkeparti)	1
Centre Party (Senterpartiet)	2
Socialist Left Party (Sosialistisk Venstreparti)	6
Liberal Party (Venstre)	1
Total number of members:	23

Klæbu kommunestyre 1991–1995
Party name (in Norwegian)	Number of representatives
Labour Party (Arbeiderpartiet)	10
Progress Party (Fremskrittspartiet)	1
Conservative Party (Høyre)	5
Christian Democratic Party (Kristelig Folkeparti)	1
Centre Party (Senterpartiet)	3
Socialist Left Party (Sosialistisk Venstreparti)	4
Liberal Party (Venstre)	1
Total number of members:	25

Klæbu kommunestyre 1987–1991
Party name (in Norwegian)	Number of representatives
Labour Party (Arbeiderpartiet)	11
Progress Party (Fremskrittspartiet)	2
Conservative Party (Høyre)	5
Christian Democratic Party (Kristelig Folkeparti)	1
Centre Party (Senterpartiet)	2
Socialist Left Party (Sosialistisk Venstreparti)	2
Liberal Party (Venstre)	2
Total number of members:	25

Klæbu kommunestyre 1983–1987
Party name (in Norwegian)	Number of representatives
Labour Party (Arbeiderpartiet)	11
Progress Party (Fremskrittspartiet)	1
Conservative Party (Høyre)	6
Socialist Left Party (Sosialistisk Venstreparti)	2
Liberal Party (Venstre)	1
Joint list of the Centre Party (Senterpartiet) and the Christian Democratic Party (Kristelig Folkeparti)	4
Total number of members:	25

Klæbu kommunestyre 1979–1983
Party name (in Norwegian)	Number of representatives
Labour Party (Arbeiderpartiet)	7
Conservative Party (Høyre)	5
Christian Democratic Party (Kristelig Folkeparti)	1
Centre Party (Senterpartiet)	2
Socialist Left Party (Sosialistisk Venstreparti)	1
Liberal Party (Venstre)	1
Total number of members:	17

Klæbu kommunestyre 1975–1979
Party name (in Norwegian)	Number of representatives
Labour Party (Arbeiderpartiet)	7
Socialist Left Party (Sosialistisk Venstreparti)	1
Joint list of the Conservative Party (Høyre), Christian Democratic Party (Kristelig Folkeparti), New People's Party (Nye Folkepartiet), Centre Party (Senterpartiet), and Liberal Party (Venstre)	8
The Free Voters (De Frie Velgere)	1
Total number of members:	17

Klæbu kommunestyre 1971–1975
Party name (in Norwegian)	Number of representatives
Labour Party (Arbeiderpartiet)	9
Christian Democratic Party (Kristelig Folkeparti)	1
Joint List(s) of Non-Socialist Parties (Borgerlige Felleslister)	7
Total number of members:	17

Klæbu kommunestyre 1967–1971
Party name (in Norwegian)	Number of representatives
Labour Party (Arbeiderpartiet)	7
Joint List(s) of Non-Socialist Parties (Borgerlige Felleslister)	6
Total number of members:	13

Klæbu kommunestyre 1963–1967
Party name (in Norwegian)	Number of representatives
Labour Party (Arbeiderpartiet)	8
Centre Party (Senterpartiet)	2
Joint List(s) of Non-Socialist Parties (Borgerlige Felleslister)	3
Total number of members:	13

Klæbu herredsstyre 1959–1963
Party name (in Norwegian)	Number of representatives
Labour Party (Arbeiderpartiet)	8
Conservative Party (Høyre)	1
Christian Democratic Party (Kristelig Folkeparti)	1
Centre Party (Senterpartiet)	2
Liberal Party (Venstre)	1
Total number of members:	13

Klæbu herredsstyre 1955–1959
Party name (in Norwegian)	Number of representatives
Labour Party (Arbeiderpartiet)	7
Joint List(s) of Non-Socialist Parties (Borgerlige Felleslister)	6
Total number of members:	13

Klæbu herredsstyre 1951–1955
Party name (in Norwegian)	Number of representatives
Labour Party (Arbeiderpartiet)	6
Joint List(s) of Non-Socialist Parties (Borgerlige Felleslister)	6
Total number of members:	12

Klæbu herredsstyre 1947–1951
Party name (in Norwegian)	Number of representatives
Labour Party (Arbeiderpartiet)	6
Liberal Party (Venstre)	2
Joint List(s) of Non-Socialist Parties (Borgerlige Felleslister)	4
Total number of members:	12

Klæbu herredsstyre 1945–1947
Party name (in Norwegian)	Number of representatives
Labour Party (Arbeiderpartiet)	6
Joint List(s) of Non-Socialist Parties (Borgerlige Felleslister)	6
Total number of members:	12

Klæbu herredsstyre 1937–1941*
Party name (in Norwegian)	Number of representatives
Labour Party (Arbeiderpartiet)	7
Joint List(s) of Non-Socialist Parties (Borgerlige Felleslister)	5
Total number of members:	12
Note: Due to the German occupation of Norway during World War II, no elections were held for new municipal councils until after the war ended in 1945.

=== Mayors ===
The mayor (Norwegian: ordfører) of Klæbu Municipality was the political leader of the municipality and the chairperson of the municipal council. The following people have held this position:

- 1838–1839: Hans Jørgen Darre
- 1840–1851: Lars Larsen Forseth, Sr.
- 1852–1855: Eskild Lysklæth
- 1856–1863: Nicolai Ulstad
- 1864–1867: Eskild Lysklæth
- 1868–1879: Lars Larsen Forseth, Jr. (V)
- 1880–1881: Sivert Thonstad (H)
- 1882–1887: Ludvig Lysklæth
- 1888–1892: Hannibal Hartmann
- 1892–1893: Andreas Nideng (H)
- 1894–1895: Sivert Thonstad (H)
- 1896–1904: Ole Aune (V)
- 1905–1913: Paul O. Lium (V)
- 1914–1916: Karl Ulstad (V)
- 1917–1919: Ole Halseth (Ap)
- 1920–1928: Paul O. Lium (Bp)
- 1929–1931: Ole Halseth (Ap)
- 1932–1934: John E. Nervik (Ap)
- 1935–1937: Bernt Forset (Bp)
- 1938–1941: John E. Nervik (Ap)
- 1941–1945: Torbjørn Lium (NS)
- 1945–1945: Bernt Forset (Bp)
- 1945–1945: John E. Nervik (Ap)
- 1946–1957: Johan Nervik (Ap)
- 1958–1959: Lars Bendiksvoll (Ap)
- 1960–1963: Sigurd Gjølgali (Ap)
- 1964–1967: Lars Bendiksvoll (Ap)
- 1968–1979: Reidar Fosshode (Ap)
- 1980–1983: Arild Huitfeldt (H)
- 1984–1987: Ivar Myhre (Ap)
- 1988–1989: Kai Nordseth (Ap)
- 1990–1991: Sverre Tangen (Ap)
- 1992–2007: Ivar Skei (SV)
- 2007–2015: Jarle Martin Gundersen (Sp)
- 2015–2019: Kirsti Tømmervold (Ap)

== See also ==
- List of former municipalities of Norway
