= Sholem =

Sholem is a given name and a surname. Notable people called Sholem include:

Given name:

- Sholem Yakov Abramovich (1836–1917), Jewish author, founder of modern Yiddish and Hebrew literature
- Sholem Aleichem (1859–1916), Yiddish author and playwright in the Russian Empire and United States
- Sholem Asch (1880–1957), Polish-Jewish novelist, dramatist, and essayist who settled in the United States
- Sholem Schwarzbard (1886–1938), Jewish Russian-born French Yiddish poet
- Sholem Shtern (1907–1990), Canadian Yiddish poet, novelist, and critic

Surname:

- Gerschom Sholem (1897–1982), German-born Israeli philosopher and historian
- Lee Sholem (1913–2000), American television and film director

== See also ==
- Scholem
- Shalem (disambiguation)
- Shalom
- Sholim
- Solem (disambiguation)
