= Solem (surname) =

Solem is a Norwegian surname. As of 2013, there were 1,926 people with this surname in Norway.

== Notable people ==
Notable people with this surname include:

- Alan Solem (1931–1990), American malacologist
- Arent Solem (1777-1857), Norwegian merchant and Haugean
- Erik Solem (1877–1949), Norwegian judge
- Jeff Solem (born 1948), American football player
- Johndale Solem (born 1941), American physicist
- Kari Solem (born 1974), Norwegian handball player
- Morten Solem (born 1980), Norwegian ski jumper
- Ossie Solem (1891-1986), American football coach
- Phil Solem (born 1956), American musician
- Randi Solem (1775-1859), Norwegian religious leader
- Rolf Solem (1917–2011), Norwegian jurist
