= List of tallest structures in Norway =

A list of the tallest structures in Norway. This list contains all types of structures.

Name	Pinnacle height		Year	Structural type	Location	Coordinates	Remarks
Longwave transmitter Ingøy	360 m	1,181 ft	2000	Guyed mast	Ingøya, Finnmark	71°4′17″N 24°5′14″E	Tallest structure in Scandinavia
Hovdefjell transmitter	250 m	820 ft	?	guyed mast	Myra, Agder	58°42′12.62″N 8°39′30.21″E	
Vigra transmitter	243 m	797 ft	1953	Guyed mast	Vigra, Møre og Romsdal	62°32′26″N 6°2′52″E	Height was reduced to 232 metres in 1999. Demolished 2011.
Hamnefjell transmitter	241 m	791 ft	?	guyed mast	Båtsfjord, Finnmark	70°40′12.26″N 29°42′37.67″E	
Høiåsmasten	231 m	758 ft	1980	Partially guyed tower	Halden, Østfold	59°10′31″N 11°25′43″E	Height above ground is 758 feet (231 m) according to official VFR chart of Southern Norway.
Kløfta transmitter	230 m	755 ft	1954	Guyed mast	Kløfta, Akershus	60°3′16″N 11°9′39″E	Longwave transmitter on 216 kHz, shutdown in 1995, dismantled (when?)
Værlandet LORAN-C transmitter	220 m	722 ft		Guyed mast	Værlandet, Vestland	61°17′50″N 4°41′47″E	Insulated against ground
Berlevåg LORAN-C transmitter	219 m	719 ft		Guyed mast	Berlevåg, Finnmark	70°50′43″N 29°12′17″E	Insulated against ground
Greipstad transmitter	218 m	715 ft	1958	Partially guyed tower	Greipstad, Kristiansand, Agder	58°13′8″N 7°51′6″E	
Tryvannshøyden TV Mast	209 m	686 ft		Guyed mast	Oslo	59°59′5.87″N 10°40′11.8″E	close to Tryvannstårnet. Height above ground is 686 ft according to Norway VFR chart.
Gossen transmitter	200 m	656 ft	?	guyed mast	Gossa, Møre og Romsdal	62°47′08.97″N 6°54′05.01″E	LF-transmitter, insulated against ground
Vassfjellet transmitter, large mast	200 m	660 ft	2001	Guyed mast	Melhus/Trondheim, Trøndelag	63°15′39.27″N 10°21′27.73″E	On the summit of Vassfjellet
Bø LORAN-C transmitter	192 m	630 ft		Guyed mast	Bø, Nordland	68°38′6″N 14°27′47″E	Insulated against ground
LORAN-C transmitter Jan Mayen	190 m	623 ft		Guyed mast	Jan Mayen, Arctic Ocean	70°54′51.478″N 8°43′56.53″W	Insulated against ground, built as replacement of 190.5 metre tower collapsed in 1980 as result of icing.
Nordhue transmitter	182 m	597 ft		Partially guyed tower	Elverum, Innlandet	60°59′38″N 11°20′16″E	lattice tower as basement
Bokn transmitter	168 m	551 ft		Guyed mast	Bokn, Rogaland	59°13′12.79″N 5°25′42.37″E	
Grenland Bridge	166 m	545 ft	1996	Bridge	Porsgrunn, Telemark	59°3′10″N 9°40′33″E	
Skavlen transmitter	165 m	541 ft	1975	Guyed mast	Inderøy, Trøndelag	63°46′19″N 10°57′4″E	
Kongsvinger transmitter	163 m	535 ft		Guyed mast	Kongsvinger, Innlandet	60°10′4″N 11°59′38″E	
Vealøs TV Tower	163 m	535 ft		Tower	Skien, Telemark	59°14′9.48″N 9°41′57.24″E	Tallest completely free-standing radio tower in Norway
Lyngdal transmitter	156 m	512 ft	1954	Partially guyed tower	Lyngdal, Agder	58°11′33″N 6°55′57″E	
Gamlemsveten transmitter	154 m	505 ft	?	Partially guyed tower	Haram, Møre og Romsdal	62°34′29.53″N 6°19′6.37″E	
Skarnsund Bridge	152 m	499 ft	1991	Bridge	Inderøy, Trøndelag	63°50′35.42″N 11°4′31.54″E	
Askøy Bridge	152 m	499 ft	1992	Bridge	Bergen/Askøy, Vestland	60°23′46″N 5°12′51″E	
Storøy Vindpark	150 m	492 ft	2018	Windmill	Karmøy, Rogaland	59°24′56″N 5°13′37″E	
Steinfjellet transmitter	148 m	486 ft	?	Partially guyed tower	Bremanger, Vestland	61°52′31″N 4°59′23″E	
Old chimney of Sarpsborg Borregaard Works	147 m	482 ft	1976	Chimney	Sarpsborg, Østfold	59°16′36.09″N 11°7′39.19″E	demolished in 2008
Karmsundet Powerline Crossing	143.5 m	471 ft		Electricity pylon	Karmsund, Rogaland	59°19′7″N 5°19′11″E ;59°19′3″N 5°19′11″E ;59°19′0″N 5°19′10″E ;59°19′6″N 5°20′17″E ;59°19′1″N 5°20′9″E ;59°18′56″N 5°20′5″E	6 pylons
Bagn transmitter	140 m	459 ft		Concrete Tower	Bagn, Innlandet	60°48′32″N 9°37′0″E	
Kattnakken transmitter	140 m	460 ft		Concrete Tower	Leirvik, Vestland	59°52′26″N 5°29′36″E	
Helgeland Bridge	140 m	459 ft	1991	Bridge	Sandnessjøen, Nordland	66°2′10″N 12°42′30″E	
Sotra Decca Transmitter	136 m	446 ft		Guyed mast	Ågotnes, Vestland	60°24′24″N 5°00′34″E	Insulated against ground, demolished
Hodne Decca Transmitter	136 m	446 ft		Guyed mast	Hodne, Stavanger, Rogaland	58°47′15″N 5°32′42″E	Insulated against ground, demolished 22 January 1997.
Geitfjellet transmitter	131 m	430 ft	1962	Partially guyed tower	Grong, Trøndelag	64°24′51″N 12°12′45″E	
Lakssvelafjellet transmitter	130 m	427 ft	?	Partially guyed tower	Bjerkreim, Rogaland	58°37′59″N 5°57′17″E	
New chimney of Sarpsborg Borregaard Works	130 m	427 ft		Chimney	Sarpsborg, Østfold		
Tyholttårnet	124 m	407 ft		TV tower	Trondheim, Trøndelag	63°25′21″N 10°25′55″E	Tallest observation tower in Norway (revolving restaurant included in tower)
Sognal transmitter	124 m	407 ft		Concrete Tower	Kaupanger, Vestland	61°10′23.39″N 7°7′13.12″E ; 61°10′24.4″N 7°7′11.49″E	
Stad Decca Transmitter, Site North	122 m	400 ft		Guyed mast	Stad, Vestland	62°11′35″N 5°07′31″E	Insulated against ground, today mobile phone mast
Stad Decca Transmitter, Site South	122 m	400 ft		Guyed mast	Stad, Vestland	62°11′15″N 5°07′46″E	Insulated against ground, demolished
Gullsvagfjellet transmitter	120 m	394 ft		Concrete Tower	Gladstad, Nordland	65°39′25″N 11°49′41″E	
Tryvannstårnet	118 m	387 ft	1962	TV tower	Oslo	59°59′19.08″N 10°40′5.06″E	
Kvitsøy Tower	117.5 m	385 ft	1982	Tower	Kvitsøy, Rogaland	59°3′21″N 5°26′14″E	Grounded tower with cage antenna for MF-broadcasting
Oslo Plaza	117 m	384 ft	1991	High-rise	Oslo	59°54′44.1″N 10°45′18.9″E	Oslo PlazaTallest high-rise building in Norway
Postgirobygget	110 m	361 ft	1975	High-rise	Oslo	59°54′41″N 10°45′16″E	Seven floors were added to the top of this building in 2003
Gjemnessund Bridge	108 m	354 ft	1992	Bridge	Gjemnes, Møre og Romsdal	62°58′12″N 7°46′40″E	
Vassfjellet transmitter, small mast	107 m	351 ft		Guyed mast	Melhus/Trondheim, Trøndelag	63°15′39.48″N 10°21′27.27″E	On the summit of Vassfjellet
Gulen transmitter	107 m	351 ft		Concrete Tower	Gulen, Vestland	61°2′2″N 5°9′13″E	
Kongsberg transmitter	103 m	338 ft		Concrete Tower	Kongsberg, Buskerud	59°40′15″N 9°31′19″E	
Reinsfjell transmitter	103 m	338 ft		Concrete Tower	Gjemnes, Møre og Romsdal	62°55′50.2″N 7°55′38.44″E	
Nidarosdomen	98 m	322 ft	1090	Cathedral	Trondheim, Trøndelag	63°25′37″N 10°23′49″E	
Stord Bridge	97 m	318 ft	2000	Bridge	Stord, Vestland	59°44′51″N 5°24′10″E	
Jetta transmitter				Concrete Tower	Blåhø, Innlandet	61°53′52″N 9°17′0″E	
Tron transmitter				Concrete Tower	Alvdal, Innlandet	62°10′26″N 10°41′44″E	
Hol transmitter				Guyed mast	Ål, Telemark	60°33′32″N 8°24′12″E	
Lonahorgi transmitter				Concrete Tower	Skulestadmoen, Vestland	60°41′38.62″N 6°24′51.73″E	
Nordfjordeid transmitter				Concrete Tower	Nordfjordeid, Vestland	61°53′24.59″N 6°6′32.2″E	
Ulriken Tower	1959			Concrete Tower	Bergen, Vestland	60°22′37.82″N 5°22′52.91″E	
