= Vinne Church =

Church in Trøndelag, Norway

- Vinne kirke
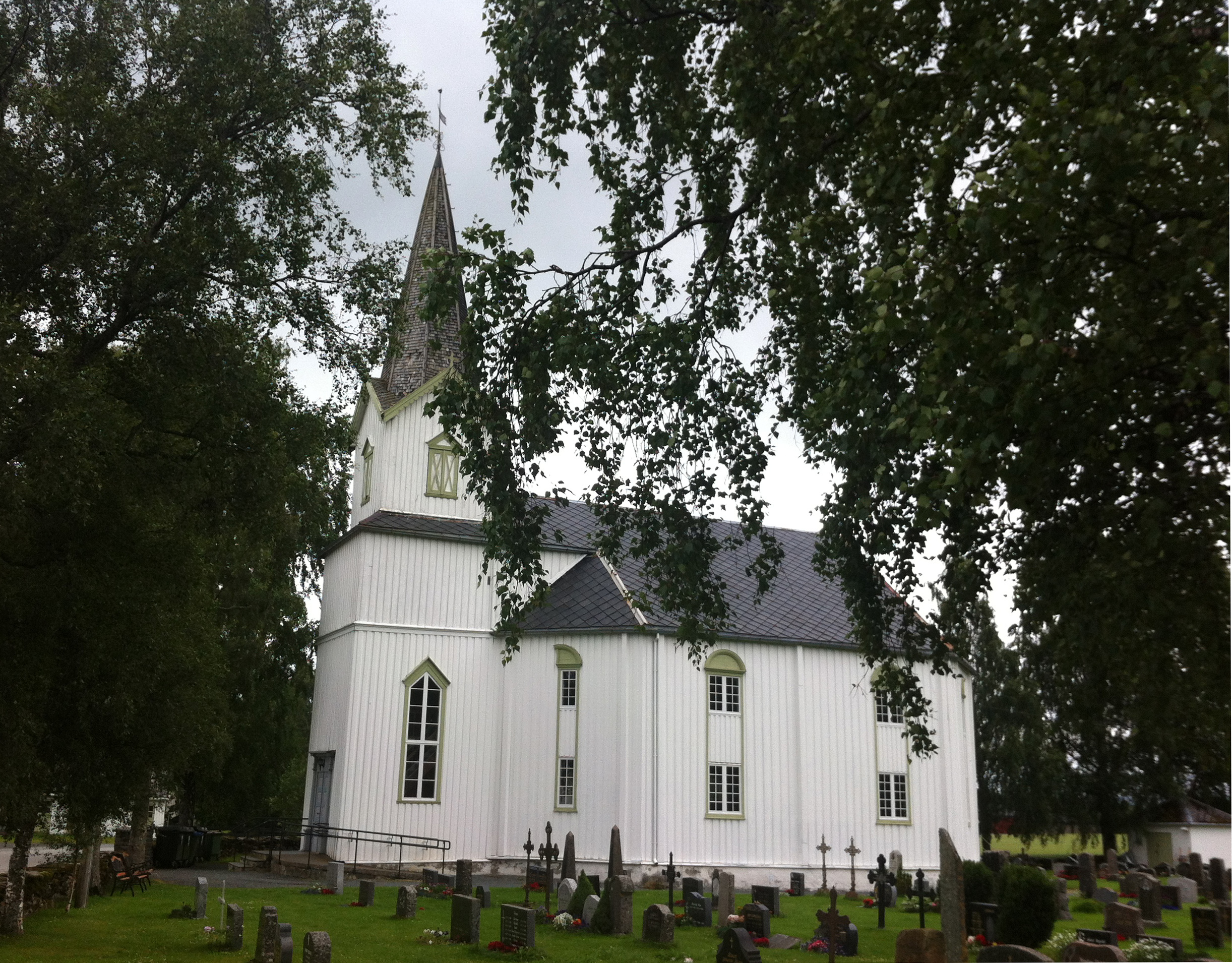
- View of the church Credit: Kj. Lie
- Vinne Church
- 63.77224647°N 11.52619511°E
- Location: Verdal Municipality, Trøndelag
- Country: Norway
- Denomination: Church of Norway
- Previous denomination: Catholic Church
- Churchmanship: Evangelical Lutheran

History
- Status: Parish church
- Founded: 15th century
- Consecrated: 29 July 1817

Architecture
- Functional status: Active
- Architectural type: Octagonal
- Completed: 1817 (209 years ago)

Specifications
- Capacity: 180
- Materials: Wood

Administration
- Diocese: Nidaros bispedømme
- Deanery: Stiklestad prosti
- Parish: Vinne
- Norwegian Cultural Heritage Site
- Type: Church
- Status: Automatically protected
- ID: 85857

Vinne Church (Norwegian: Vinne kirke) is a parish church of the Church of Norway in Verdal Municipality in Trøndelag county, Norway. It is located in the village of Vinne. It is the church for the Vinne parish which is part of the Stiklestad prosti (deanery) in the Diocese of Nidaros. The white, wooden church was built in an octagonal style in 1817 using plans drawn up by an unknown architect. The church seats about 180 people.

== History ==
The earliest existing historical records of the church date back to the year 1513, but the church was not new that year. The first church here was a stave church located at Hallan, about 3.5 kilometres (2.2 mi) southwest of the present church site. The church was originally dedicated to St. Egedius. Not much is known about the old church, but it was rather small, only measuring about 20 square metres (220 sq ft). Over the years, parts of the church were rebuilt and renovated. A new sacristy was built in 1652. In 1678, a new entry porch was built. In 1725–1726, the church received a new slate roof, a new spire, a new baptistery, and larger windows. By 1813, the church was in very poor condition so it was decided to build a new church at Vinne and to tear down the old church.

Work on the new church in Vinne, about 3.5 kilometres (2.2 mi) northeast of the old church site began in 1814. The new church was designed to be octagonal, inspired by the design of the Klæbu Church. After the new church was completed, the old church was intended to be turned into a local granary. Johannes Forberg from Ytterøy worked as a builder for Vinne Church in the summer of 1815, and the church quickly was framed and enclosed. On 21 June 1815, the old church was struck by lightning and it burned to the ground. Nothing was saved from the old church. The new church wasn't finished when the old church burned down, so the parish was without a church for some time. Also during this time there was dissatisfaction with the builder of the new church, and the builder was fired in August 2016. While the disagreements raged, it seems that the builder and his work team continued. Special permission was granted to start using the new church December 1816 even though the church was not yet finished. The new church in Vinne was consecrated on 29 July 1817. After the fire, the old cemetery at Hallan was used for burials until almost 1880. In 1983, a memorial stone was erected on the site.

== Media gallery ==
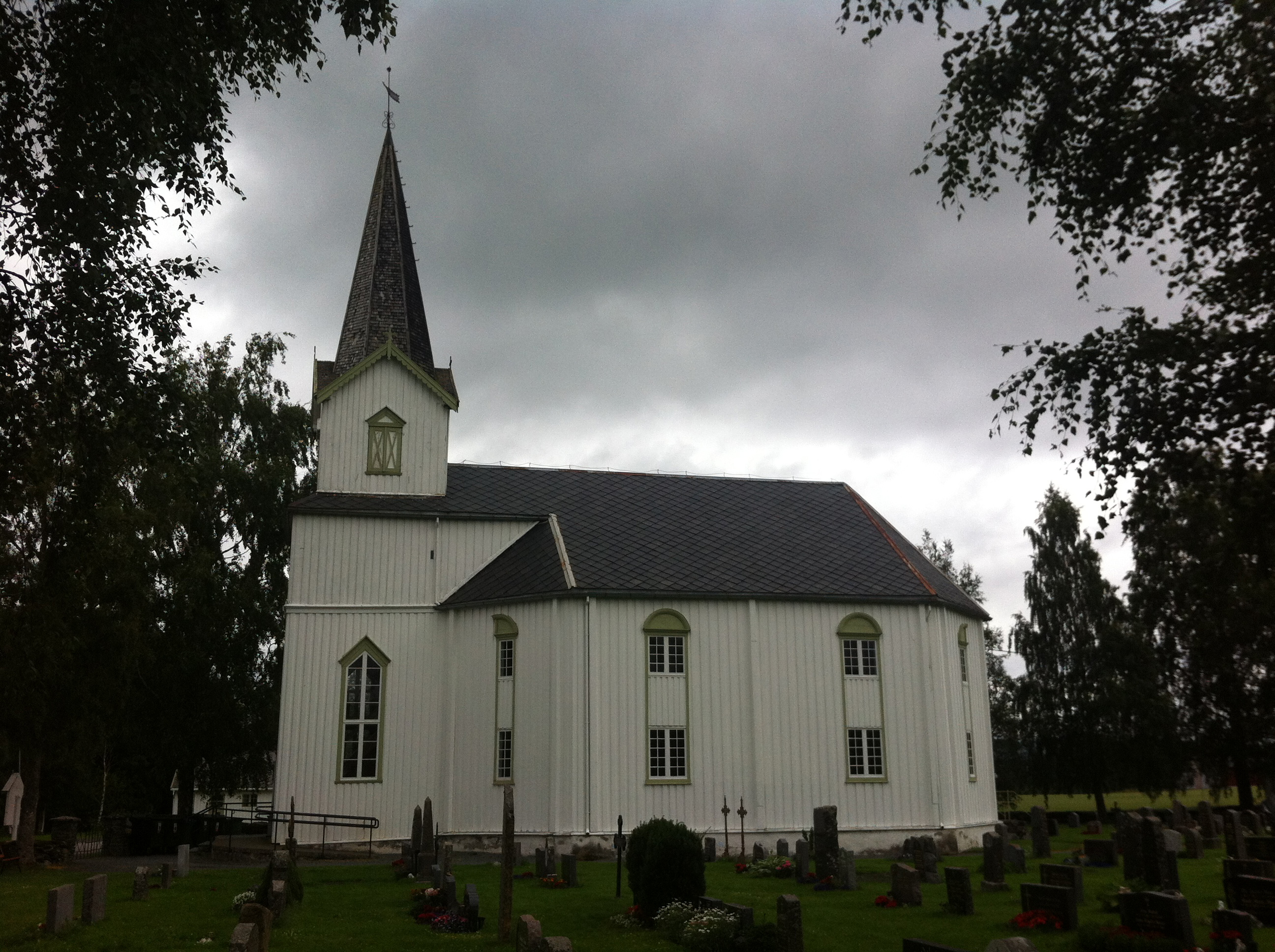

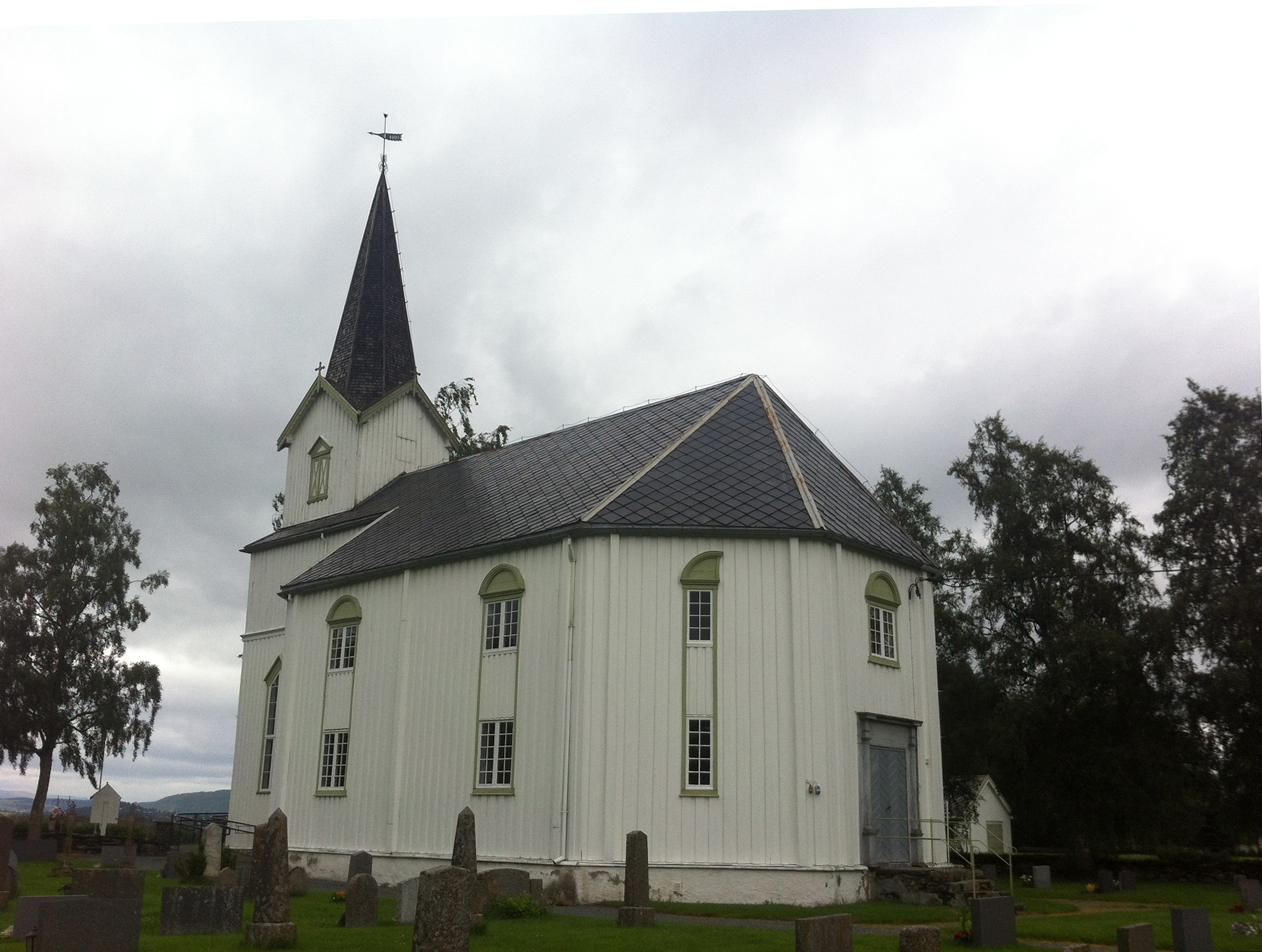

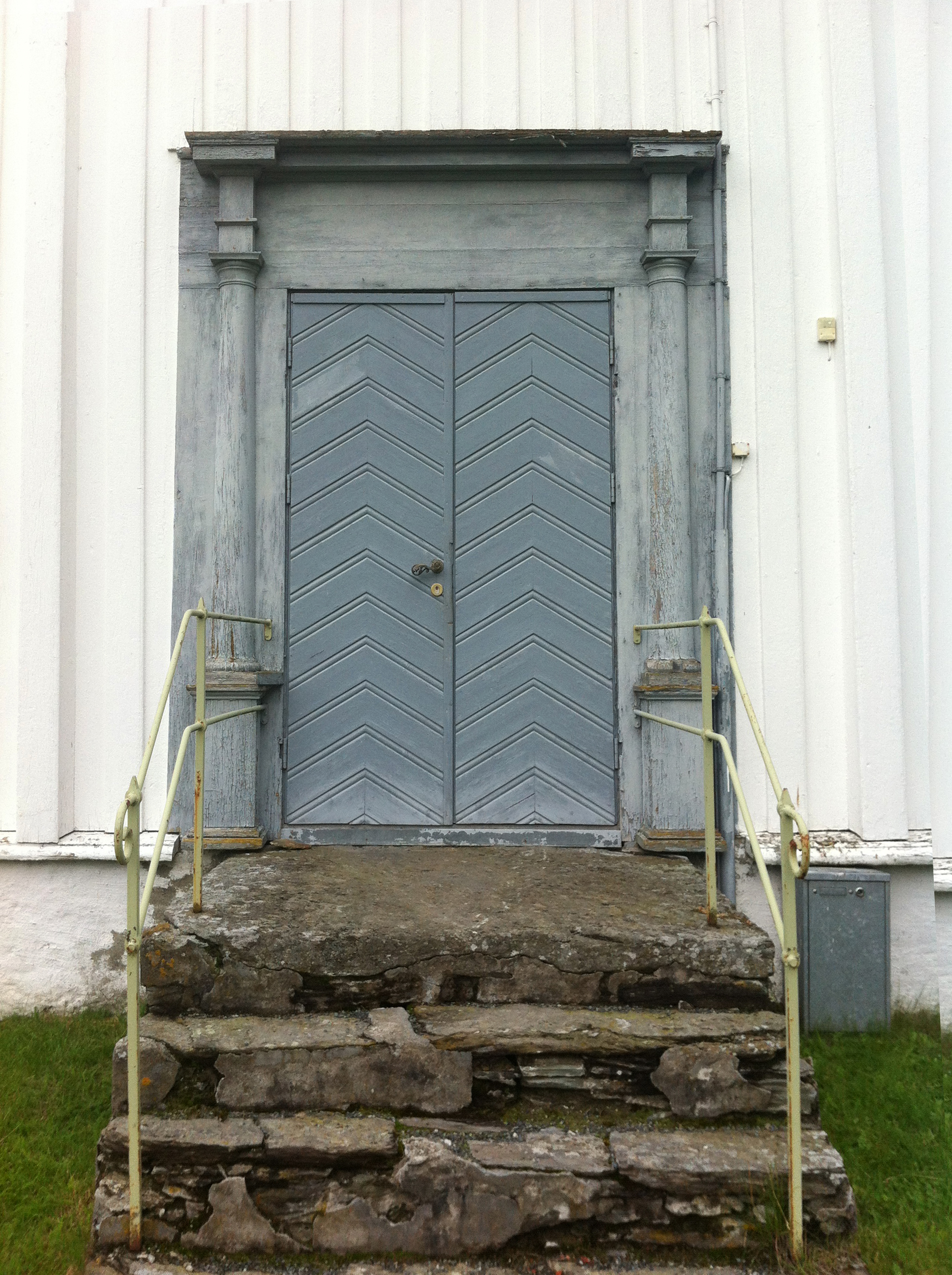

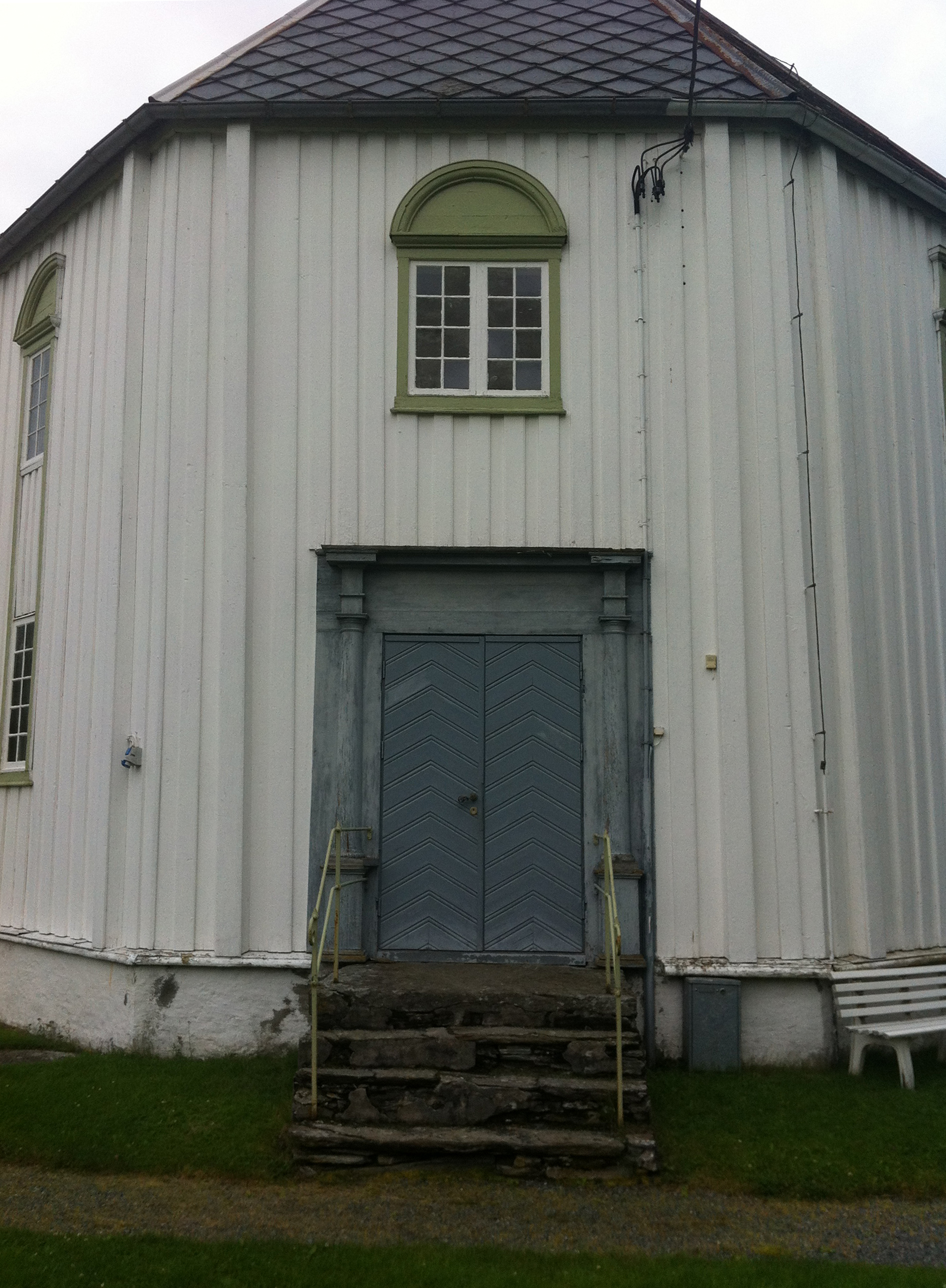

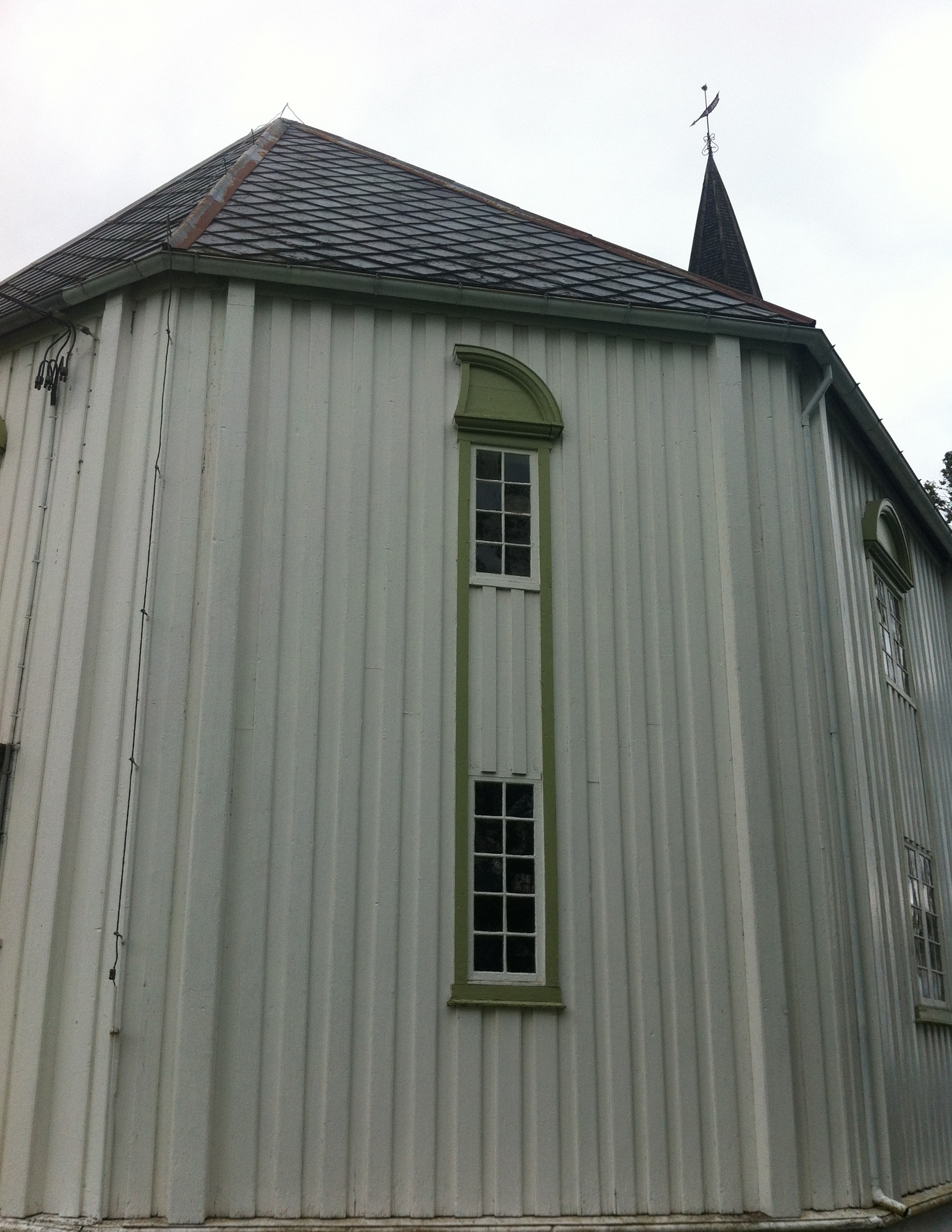

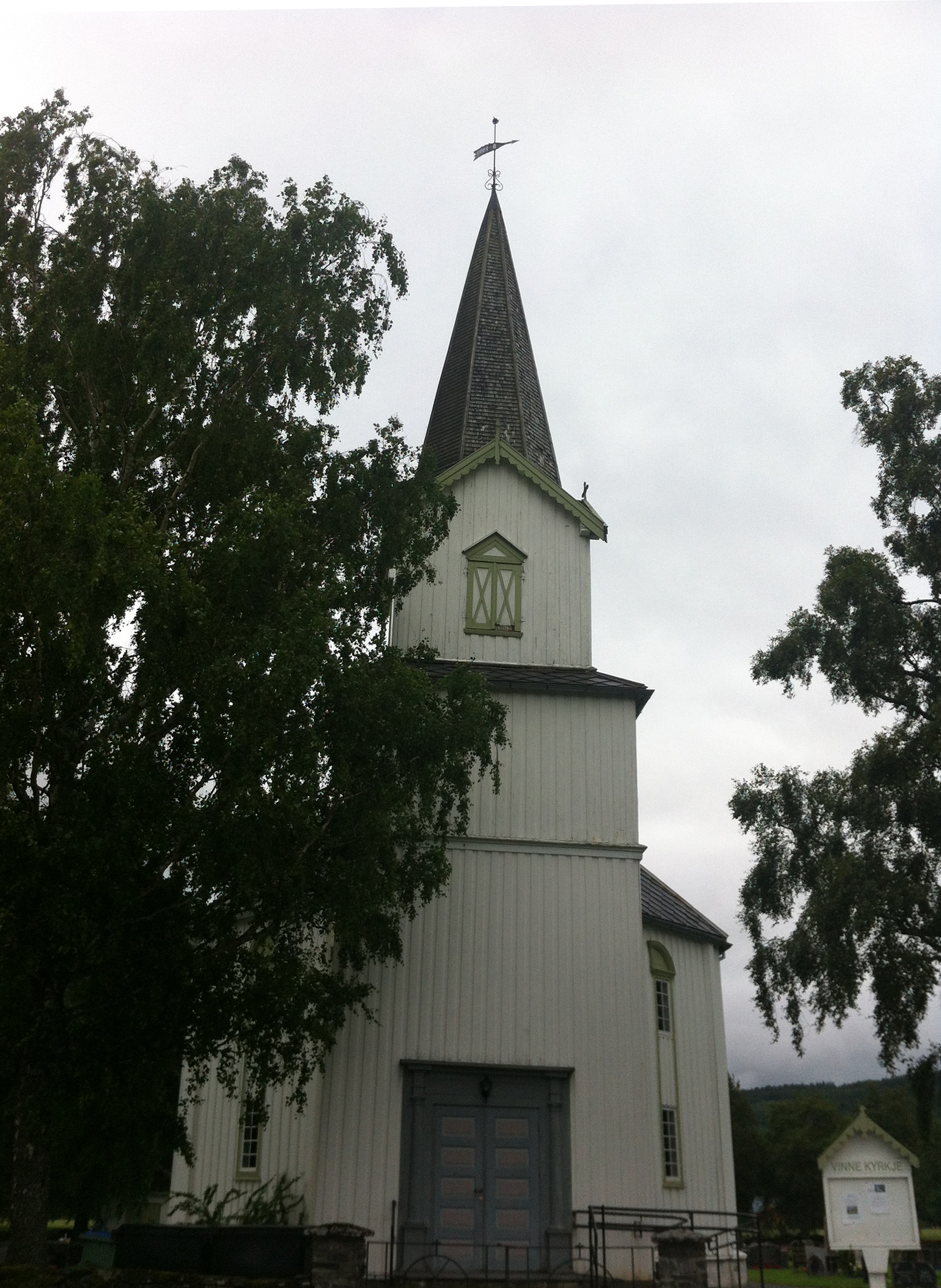

== See also ==
- List of churches in Nidaros
