= Vassfjell Chapel =

Chapel in Trøndelag, Norway

- Vassfjellkapellet
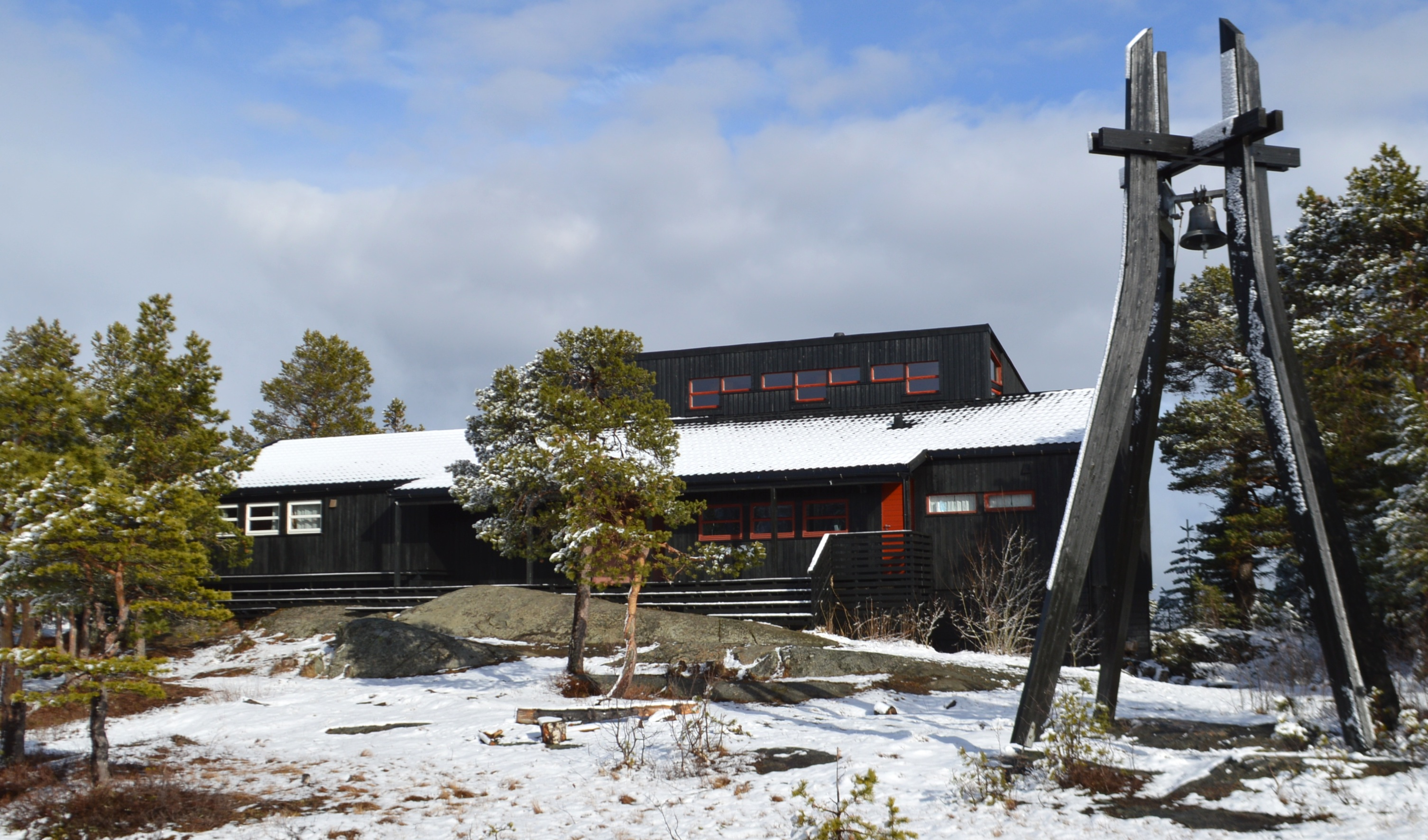
- View of the chapel in 2015
- Vassfjell Chapel
- 63.309831865°N 10.404846668°E
- Location: Trondheim Municipality, Trøndelag
- Country: Norway
- Denomination: Church of Norway
- Churchmanship: Evangelical Lutheran
- Website: vassfjellkapellet.no

History
- Status: Chapel
- Founded: 1974
- Consecrated: 4 Mar 1974

Architecture
- Functional status: Active
- Architect(s): Steinar Romedal, Jan Oddvar Hareide, I. Tolo, and O. Holen
- Architectural type: Long church
- Completed: 1974 (52 years ago)

Specifications
- Materials: Wood

Administration
- Diocese: Nidaros bispedømme
- Deanery: Heimdal og Byåsen prosti
- Parish: Klæbu
- Norwegian Cultural Heritage Site
- Type: Church
- Status: Not protected
- ID: 85778

Vassfjell Chapel (Norwegian: Vassfjellkapellet) is a chapel in Trondheim Municipality in Trøndelag county, Norway. It is located in a rural area northeast of the mountain Vassfjellet, about 1.5 kilometres (0.93 mi) west of the village of Tanem. There is no direct road access to the chapel, but there is a 1-kilometre (0.62 mi) long hiking path from a parking lot located on the road to the north. It is an annex chapel for the Klæbu parish which is part of the Heimdal og Byåsen prosti (deanery) in the Diocese of Nidaros. The white, wooden church was built in a long church style in 1974 by the architect students Steinar Romedal, Jan Oddvar Hareide, I. Tolo, and O. Holen.

== History ==
At a meeting of the Trondheim Christian Student Association (TKS) in February 1969, a decision was made to build a sports chapel in rural Klæbu Municipality (now part of Trondheim Municipality) that could be the weekend centre for students from the region. The architecture students Steinar Romedal, Jan Oddvar Hareide, I. Tolo, and O. Holen began the work of drawing the designs for the chapel, and they were able to present the drawings to the association in the spring of 1971. On 16 September 1973, the first construction phase was completed. This phase included the chapel, kitchen, and bathroom. The church was formally consecrated by the Bishop Tord Godal on 4 March 1974. Construction phase two was to build an annex building and this was constructed from 1975 to 1977. It was architect Steinar Romedal who designed this building. In 1977, the third construction phase began where they built some leadership offices and prayer rooms on the site. The last project to be completed was a free-standing bell tower that was built in 1980.

== See also ==
- List of churches in Nidaros
