= Tanem =

Village in Trondheim Municipality, Norway

- Village
- Interactive map of Tanem
- Location within Trøndelag Location within Norway
- Coordinates: 63.3081°N 10.4375°E
- Country: Norway
- Region: Central Norway
- County: Trøndelag
- Municipality: Trondheim Municipality
- Borough: Heimdal

Area
  - Total: 0.45 km^{2} (0.17 sq mi)
- Elevation: 164 m (538 ft)

Population (2024)
  - Total: 1,295
  - Density: 2,878/km^{2} (7,450/sq mi)
- Time zone: UTC+01:00 (CET)
  - Summer (DST): UTC+02:00 (CEST)
- Post Code: 7549 Tanem

Tanem is a village in Trondheim Municipality in Trøndelag county, Norway. It is located between Nidelva river and Vassfjellet approximately 3 kilometres (1.9 mi) west of the village of Klæbu which sits on the other side of the river.

The 0.45-square-kilometre (110-acre) village has a population (2024) of 1,295 and a population density of 2,878 inhabitants per square kilometre (7,450/sq mi). Tanem's population has been growing rapidly. The Tanem village itself and surrounding areas provides few employment opportunities and most of the residents of Tanem commute to Trondheim to work.

== Location ==
The village of Tanem lies at the foot of the mountain Vassfjellet and stretches westwards almost down to the river Nidelva. Vassfjellet and the forested areas around the village provides opportunities for tourism including outdoors activities like hiking, mountain biking, and foraging for berries. The local skiing clubs include Freidig Alpin and Vassfjellet SK. The local Motorcycle Club Sprengstart MC was founded here in 1983.

== Industries ==
Tanem and the areas along the Vassfjellet mountain has been a large source of naturally occurring sand and gravel and during the last 30 years has seen the establishment of several large gravel pits. This is because Tanem has been below sea level during various ice ages, and large amounts of glacifluvial residue were piled up here. Other industries in the vicinity of Tanem include logging and a water-powered electrical plant.

== History ==
The village of Tanem dates back to before the Viking Age. The hill today known as Tanemsåsen was fortified in ancient times, the remnants of this still exist and have been excavated. This hill gave its name to the old Klæbu Municipality in which Tanem was previously located, the name Klæbu being derived from the old Klæppabu, which means "the place where people live under the hill with a fort on it". Runestones have been found from this and later ages in the whole area, and one of these is the Tanem Runestone, which is listed as N KJ89 U in the Rundata catalog.
