= Solem =

Solem may refer to:

== Places ==
- Solem Ridge, in Palmer Land, Antarctica
- Solem Township, Douglas County, Minnesota

== People ==
- Solem (surname)

== Court cases ==
- Solem v. Bartlett
- Solem v. Helm
