= Ingøy radio transmitter =

Longwave transmitter

Coordinates: 71°4′18″N 24°5′14″E

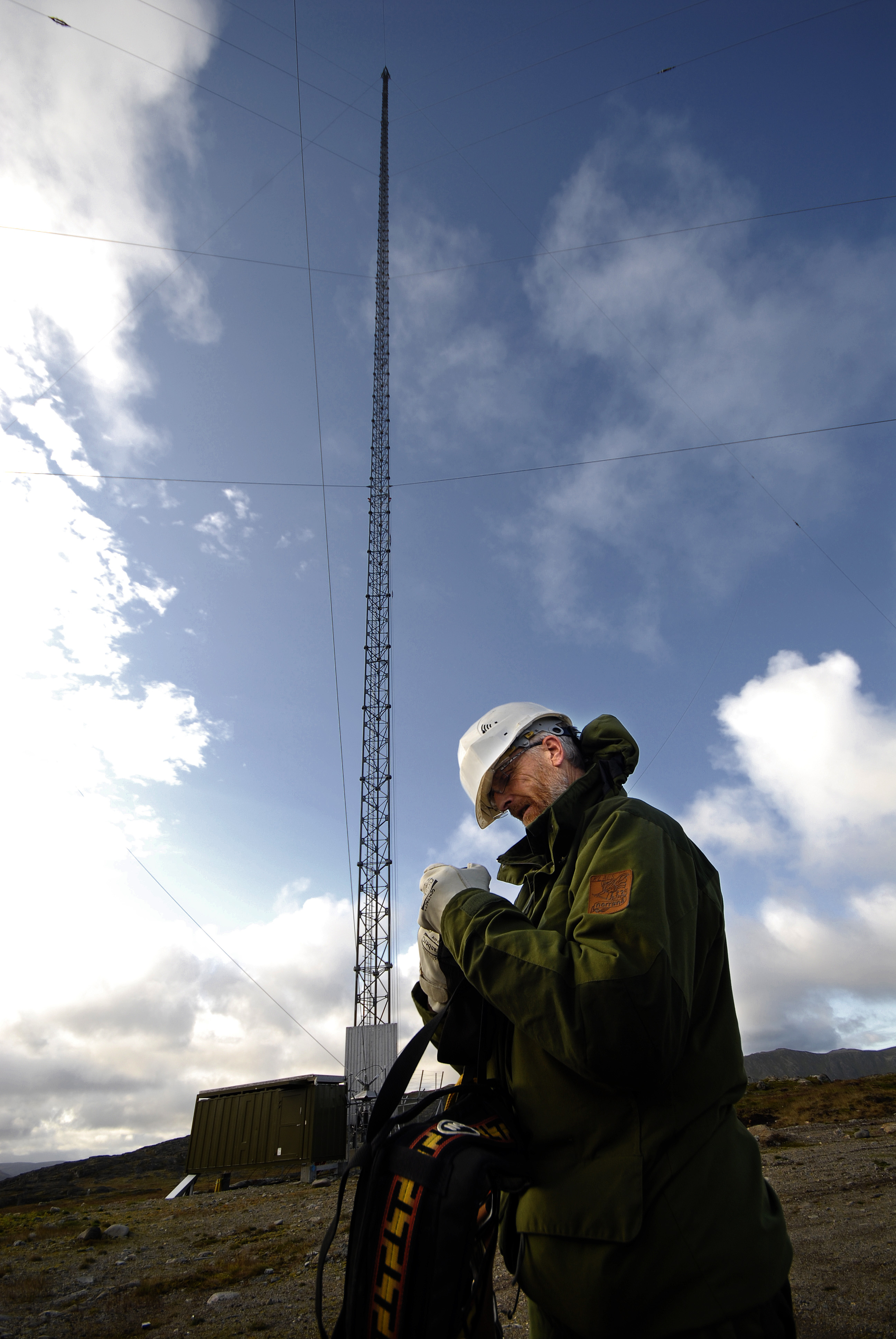
View of the Ingøy mast

The Ingøy radio transmitter was a longwave transmitter of the Norwegian Broadcasting Corporation located in the far north of the country. It broadcast on a frequency of 153 kHz in the longwave band and with a power of 100 kW.

It is located about 2 kilometres (1 1/4 miles) south of the village of Ingøy on the island of Ingøya in Måsøy Municipality in Finnmark county, Norway. The current transmitter commenced service in 2000 transmitting the NRK P1 radio station and uses as antenna a 362-metre-tall (1,188 ft) guyed mast, which is grounded and fed over the guys with the radio power to be radiated. There is an Antenna tuning hut at the base of mast. The mast is the tallest structure in Norway and Scandinavia.

Norwegian public service broadcaster NRK were quoted in 2015 as saying "It’s a service mainly for boats in the Barents Sea, northern parts of Norwegian Sea and waters around Svalbard."

There was also a previous, unrelated transmitter at Ingøya which was built in 1911 and was mainly used to communicate with mining companies operating in Svalbard until the German occupation of Norway in 1940, after which it was taken over by the Luftwaffe. That transmitter was bombed by the Germans on 6 June 1940 and by the British on 22 August 1944.

Transmissions from the Ingøy radio transmitter ended on 2 December 2019 at 00:06 CET. NRK said that the fishing vessels now used a different technology and no longer needed longwave radio broadcasts.

Although the mast still stands, the owners (Telenor Towers) have no plans to dismantle it. Due to its height, the mast is regarded as an aviation obstacle.

== See also ==
- List of masts
- List of tallest structures in Norway
