= Randi Solem =

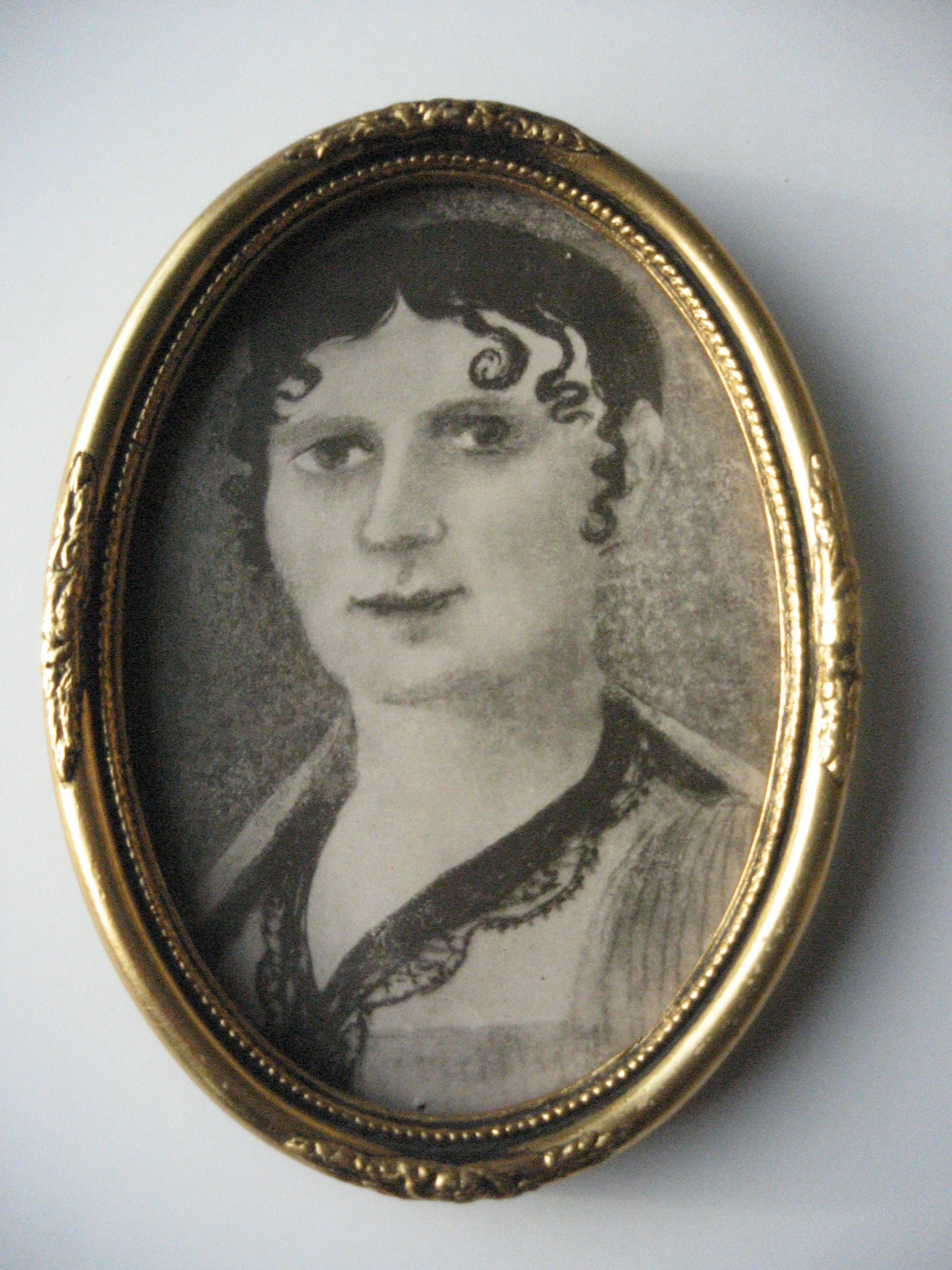
- A picture of a portrait of Randi Solem
- Born: 1775; Klæbu, Norway
- Died: 27 February 1859 (aged 83–84); Strinda, Norway
- Occupation: Religious organiser
- Spouse: Arent Solem (1775–1859)

Randi Andersdatter Solem (1775 – 27 February 1859), née Randi Lauvaas, was a religious organiser. She was married to Arent Bjørnsen Solem.

She was born in Klæbu, Sør-Trøndelag, to the farmer Anders Halvorsen Løvaas (c. 1730) and his wife Maren Larsdatter Forsæt (c. 1744). On 25 May 1797, Solem married the soldier Haagen Erichsen Nideng, who died the following year. While she was mourning she was visited in Trondheim by Hans Nielsen Hauge, leader of the Haugean Movement (haugianere). She was influenced by his engaging speeches, and traveled with him across the country and helped him with book binding in Bergen the following year. Hauge became quickly aware of her leading abilities.

In 1802, Solem was mentioned in a small publication as one of five out of thirty people he gave status as one of the "oldest" or most respected. She was at that time only 26 years old.

Before being married again, Solem skied across the Dovre Mountains to preach in the eastern regions, and was, according to Inger Furseth, a "courageous and fearless woman".

At some point after 1800 she married the one year younger Arent Solem, who was a successful businessman in Trondheim. They often held Haugean meetings in their house, where Solem developed her religious beliefs. She became interested in the works of N. F. S. Grundtvig and wanted to popularise his thoughts in Norway. After Hauge's death, Solem moved with her husband to Christiania (now Oslo) in 1824. Here, Arent established more successful enterprises, and Solem became increasingly interested in Grundtvig's thoughts. Beyond having frequent written correspondence with him, she also served as a "commissionary" for all the Haugeans in Norway wanting to read his works.

In 1840, Solem returned with her husband to Trøndelag, where their wealthy home continued to be a centre for the Haugean movement in the area.
