= Høiåsmasten =

Coordinates: 59.1753°N 11.4286°E

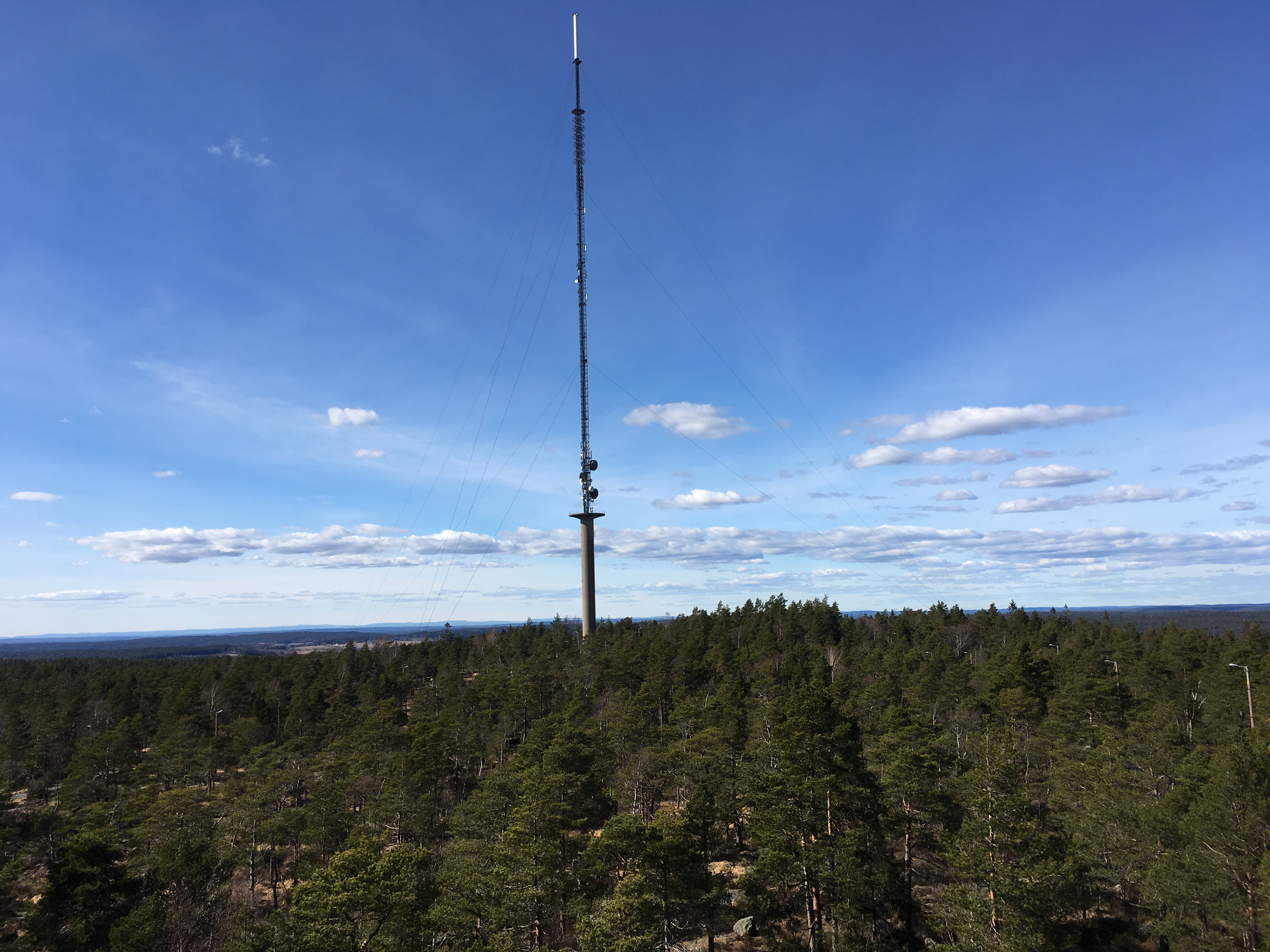
Høyås transmitter Halden

Høiåsmasten is a TV tower used for DAB-, GSM-, FM- and TV-transmission near Halden, Norway. Høiåsmasten, built in 1973, is one of the tallest partially guyed towers in the world and with a height of 238 metres (781 ft) the second tallest tower of Norway. It consists, like the Gerbrandy Tower and Vännäs TV Tower, of a concrete tower as basement on which the guyed antenna mast is mounted. However this mast is, in contrast to that of Gerbrandy Tower, a lattice structure and not a tube structure.

== See also ==
- List of masts
- List of towers
- List of tallest structures in Norway
