= Arent Solem =

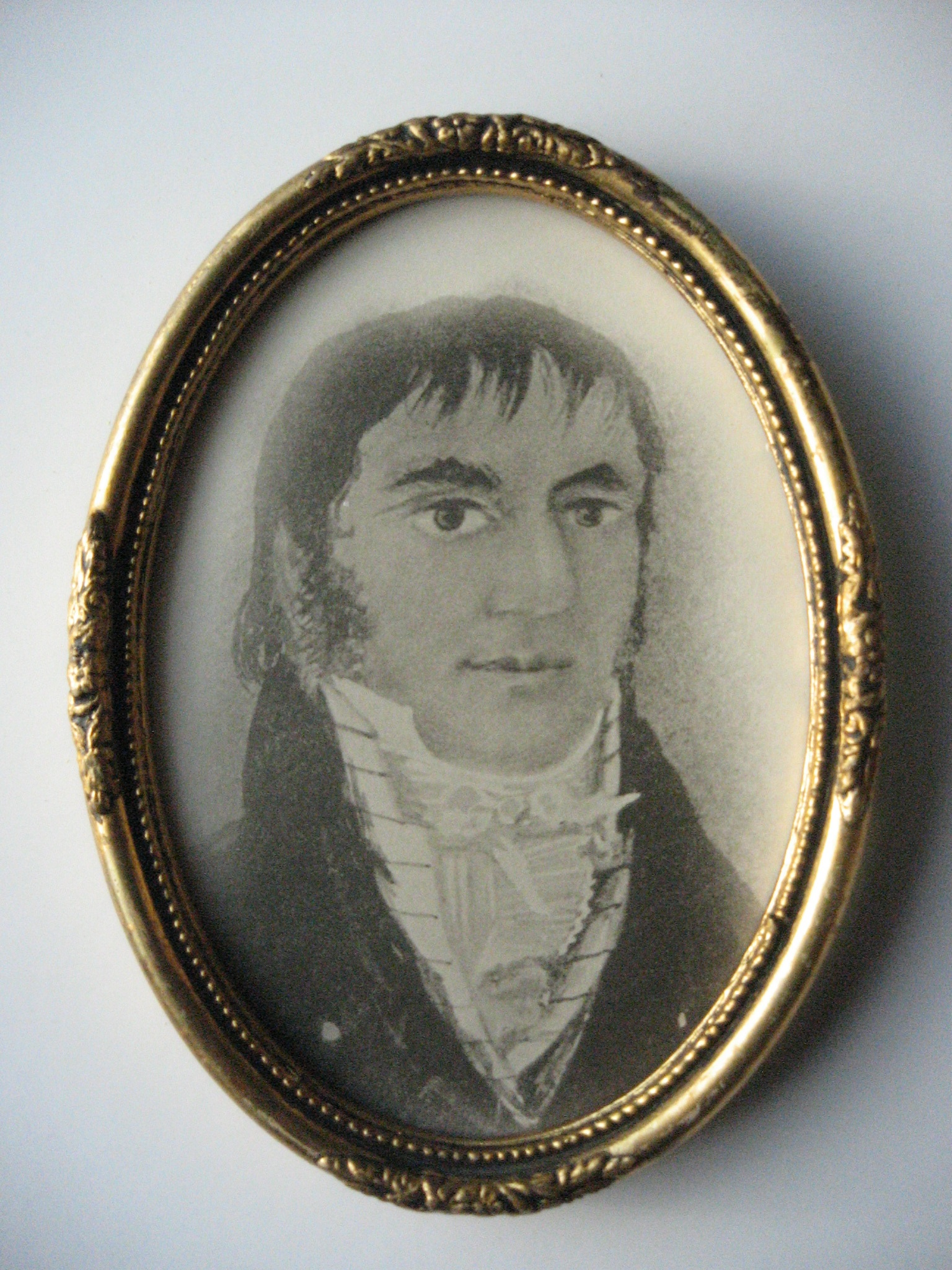
- A picture of a portrait of Arent Solem
- Born: 22 October 1777; Klæbu, Norway
- Died: 8 February 1857 (aged 79); Strinda, Norway
- Occupations: Merchant, entrepreneur
- Spouse: Randi Solem (1775–1859)

Arent Bjørnsen Solem (22 October 1777 – 8 February 1857) was a Norwegian merchant and a prominent member of the Haugean Movement (haugianere).

== Background ==
Arent Bjørnsen Solem was born in Klæbu, Søndre Trondhjems Amt, Norway. He was born to farmer Bjørn Olsen Solem (1742–1797) and his wife Magnhild Olsdatter (c. 1742–??). Although little is known about Solem's early life, it is known that he traveled to Trondheim where he worked as a carpenter. He later made success as a merchant and property investor in Trondheim, before he established a flax weavery in Moholt.

== Career ==
He became a successful entrepreneur and trusted follower of Hans Nielsen Hauge, leader of the Haugean Movement. He married Randi Nideng (née Lauvaas) in the beginning of the 19th century, with whom he maintained a hospitable home. Solem made success as a merchant and property investor in both Trøndelag and Christiania (now Oslo). After advice from Hans Nielsen Hauge, Solem bought the fishing and trade centre Sør-Gjæslingan in Sør-Trøndelag.After Hauge's death in 1824, Solem's connection with the Haugean movement was weakened.

In 1825, Solem moved to Christiania, where he bought the farms Sandaker and Storo and started a mill-and-saw enterprise at Bjølsen. Solem and his wife lived at the Sandaker farm. The farm became a centre for Grundtvigianism. Solem also extended the mill at Bakke which Hans Nielsen Hauge had earlier built in 1815.

In 1840, Solem went home with his family to Trondheim, where he continued with his mercantile business. He established during this time a shipyard in Hommelvik.

== Marriage and death ==
Solem married Randi Andersdatter Nideng (1775–1859) at some point after 1800, although the exact year is disputed. His and her entry in Norsk biografisk leksikon, both written by Andreas Aarflot, state that the marriage occurred on 9 July 1805. Historian Sverre Røvik considers this less likely, as they both met in the Haugean network many years before. Solem died at his farm in Strinda Municipality in 1857 as a wealthy and respected businessman, two years before his wife. His son, Fredrik, committed suicide in 1861 after the revealing of a fraud in Trondheim.
