= Shalem =

Shalem is an alternative name for Shalim, the Canaanite god of dusk, and the Hebrew name for the Biblical town of Salem (Hebrew: שָׁלֵם). It may also refer to:

== Places ==
- Kfar Shalem, a neighbourhood in Tel Aviv
  - Hapoel Kfar Shalem F.C., a football club based in Kfar Shalem
- Mitzpe Shalem, a settlement and former kibbutz in the West Bank
- Shalem Center, a former research institute in Jerusalem
- Shalem College, an arts college in Jerusalem
- Shalem Institute for Spiritual Formation, a Christian educational organization in Washington D.C.
- Tzur Shalem, Israeli outpost in the West Bank

== People ==
- Avinoam Shalem (born 1959), Israeli art historian
- Natan Shalem (1897–1959), Israeli geographer and geologist
- Yehoshua Shalem (born 1944), Israeli tennis player
