= KlæbuPosten =

Norwegian newspaper

KlæbuPosten (The Klæbu Gazette) is a local Norwegian newspaper published in Klæbu in the municipality of Trondheim in Trøndelag county. The newspaper was launched in February 2007, and it is published on Wednesdays.

== Editors ==
- Svein Halvor Moe (2007–2008)
- Åke Nord

== Circulation ==
According to the Norwegian Audit Bureau of Circulations and the National Association of Local Newspapers, KlæbuPosten has had the following annual circulation:

- 2008: 1,170
- 2009: 1,044
- 2010: 1,138
- 2011: 1,150
- 2012: 1,119
- 2013: 1,139
- 2014: 1,105
- 2015: 1,117
- 2016: 1,056
