= Skavlen Transmitter =

Mast in Norway

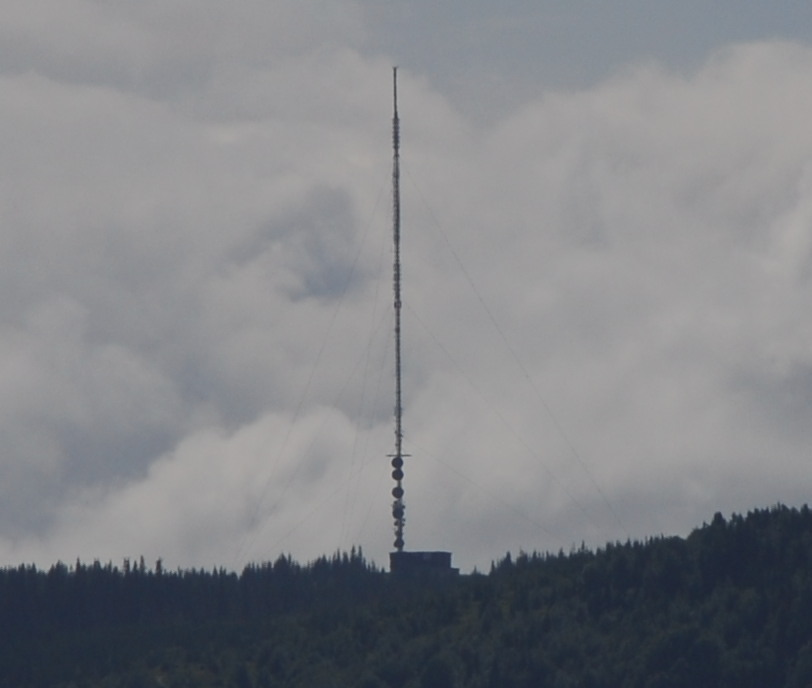
Skavlen Tramsitter

The Skavlen Transmitter is a television and radio guyed mast transmitter located about 5 kilometres (3.1 mi) to the southwest of the village of Mosvik in Inderøy Municipality, Norway at 63°46′19″N 10°57′4″E. The transmitter is 165 metres (541 ft) tall. Among the channels broadcast from the station include NRK1, NRK2, TV 2 (television), NRK P1, NRK P2, NRK P3, Radio Norge and P4 Radio Hele Norge (radio). The transmitter was constructed in 1973.
