= Klæbu Church =

Church in Trøndelag, Norway

- Klæbu kirke
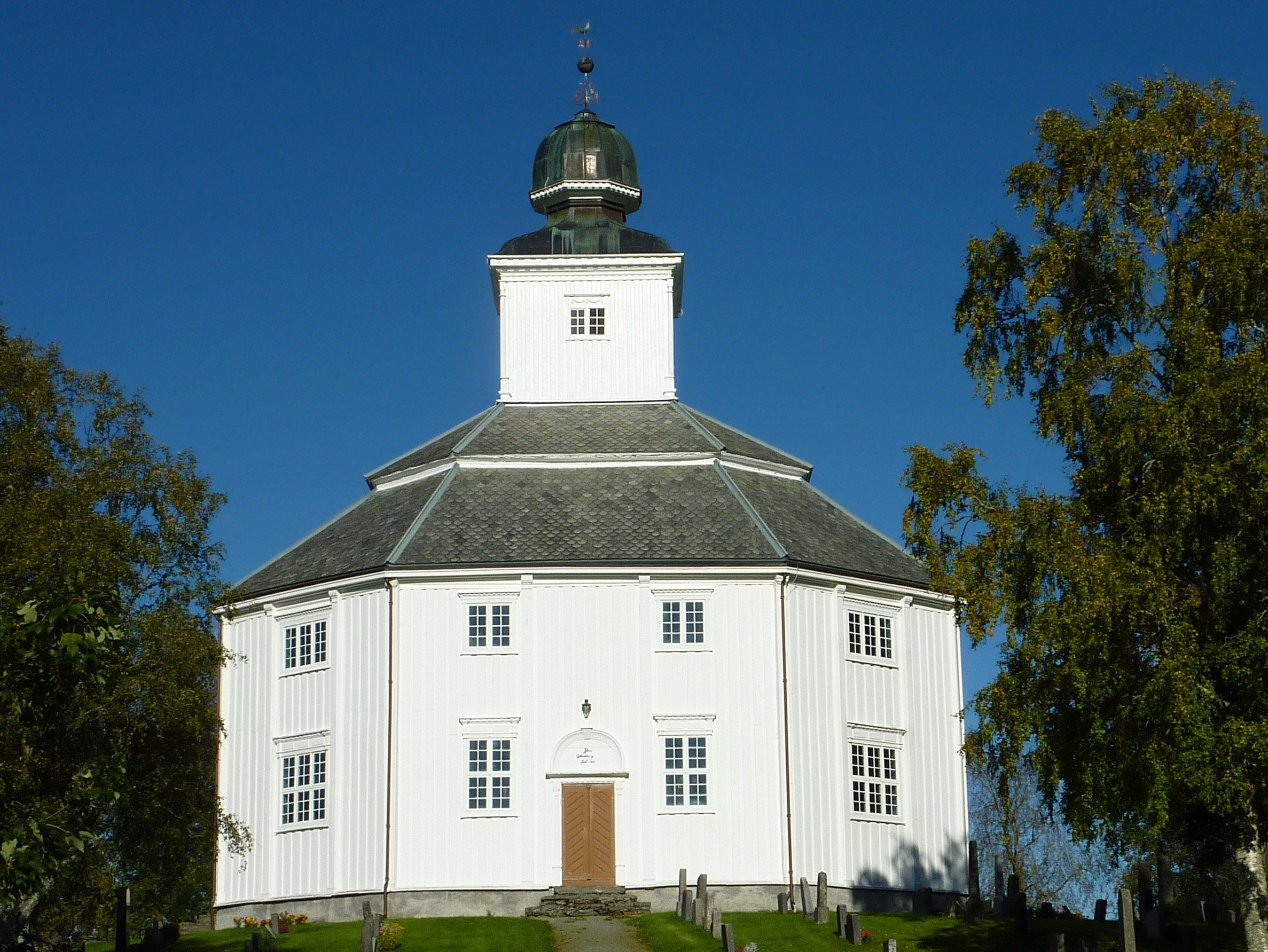
- View of the church
- Klæbu Church
- 63.2953299387°N 10.4767223597°E
- Location: Trondheim Municipality, Trøndelag
- Country: Norway
- Denomination: Church of Norway
- Churchmanship: Evangelical Lutheran

History
- Status: Parish church
- Founded: 13th century
- Consecrated: 1790

Architecture
- Functional status: Active
- Architect: Lars Forseth
- Architectural type: Octagonal
- Completed: 1790 (236 years ago)

Specifications
- Capacity: 330
- Materials: Wood

Administration
- Diocese: Nidaros bispedømme
- Deanery: Heimdal og Byåsen
- Parish: Klæbu
- Norwegian Cultural Heritage Site
- Type: Church
- Status: Automatically protected
- ID: 84797

Klæbu Church (Norwegian: Klæbu kirke) is a parish church of the Church of Norway in Trondheim Municipality in Trøndelag county, Norway. It is located in the village of Klæbu. It is the church for the Klæbu parish which is part of the Heimdal og Byåsen prosti (deanery) in the Diocese of Nidaros. The white, wooden church was built in an octagonal style in 1790 by the architect Lars Larsen Forsæth. The church seats about 330 people.

== History ==
The earliest existing historical records of the church date back to the year 1430, but the church was not new that year. The first church in Klæbu was likely a stave church and it may have been built during the 13th century.

In 1669, the old stave church was in very poor shape with parts of the choir and nave rotting away. That year, the old choir and a part of the nave were completely torn down and rebuilt using log construction. In 1685, the remainder of the old stave church was torn down and rebuilt as a log building in a cruciform design. Thus during the period from 1669-1685, the entire medieval church was torn down and rebuilt with new materials.

The log building was torn down in 1789 and a new church was built on the same site from 1789-1790. The new building was a timber-framed church was built in the shape of an elongated octagon. The new building was consecrated in 1790.

In 1814, this church served as an election church (Norwegian: valgkirke). Together with more than 300 other parish churches across Norway, it was a polling station for elections to the 1814 Norwegian Constituent Assembly which wrote the Constitution of Norway. This was Norway's first national elections. Each church parish was a constituency that elected people called "electors" who later met together in each county to elect the representatives for the assembly that was to meet at Eidsvoll Manor later that year.

From 1938-1940, the architect John Tverdahl led a restoration project in the church.

== Media gallery ==
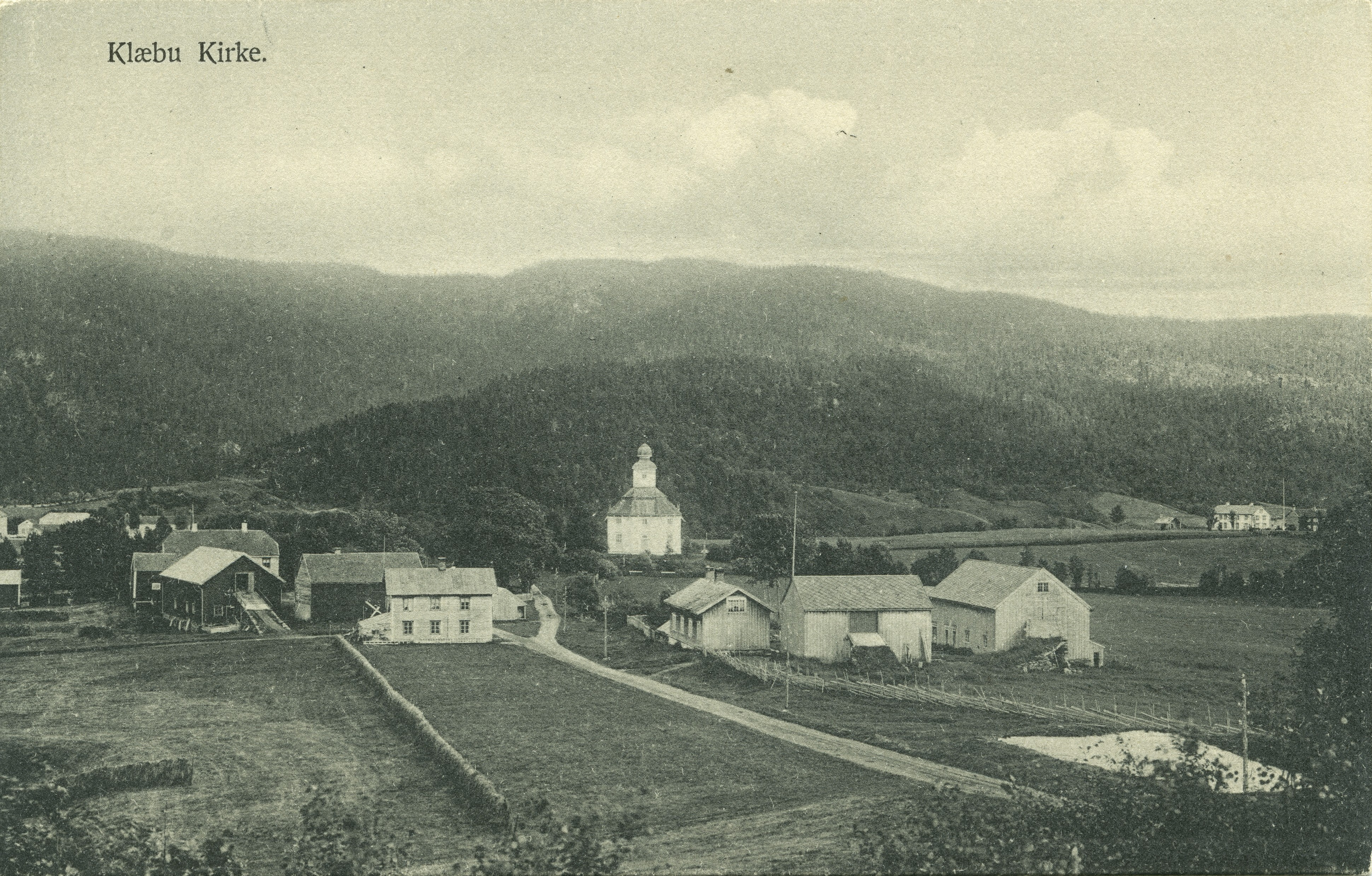

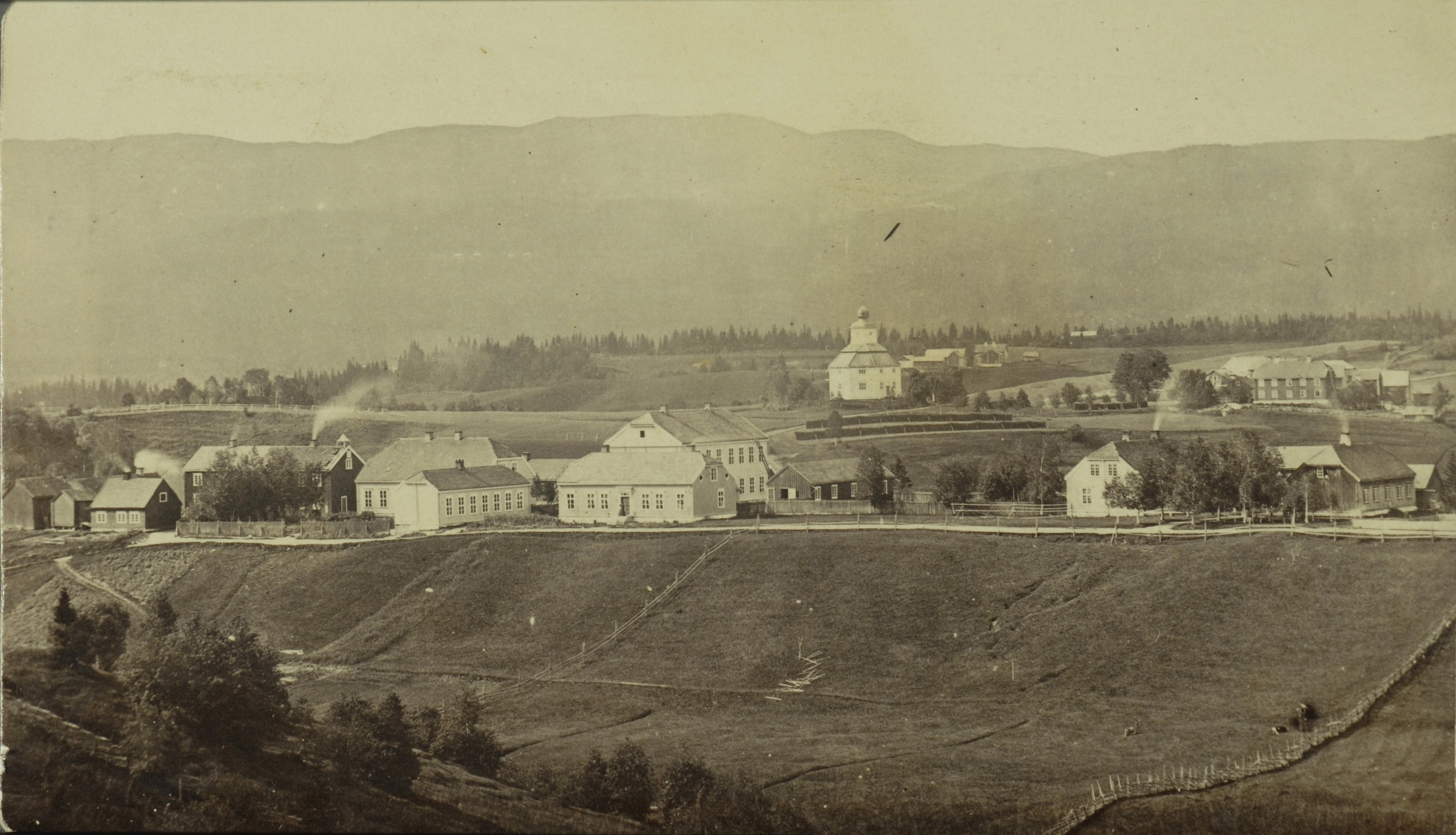

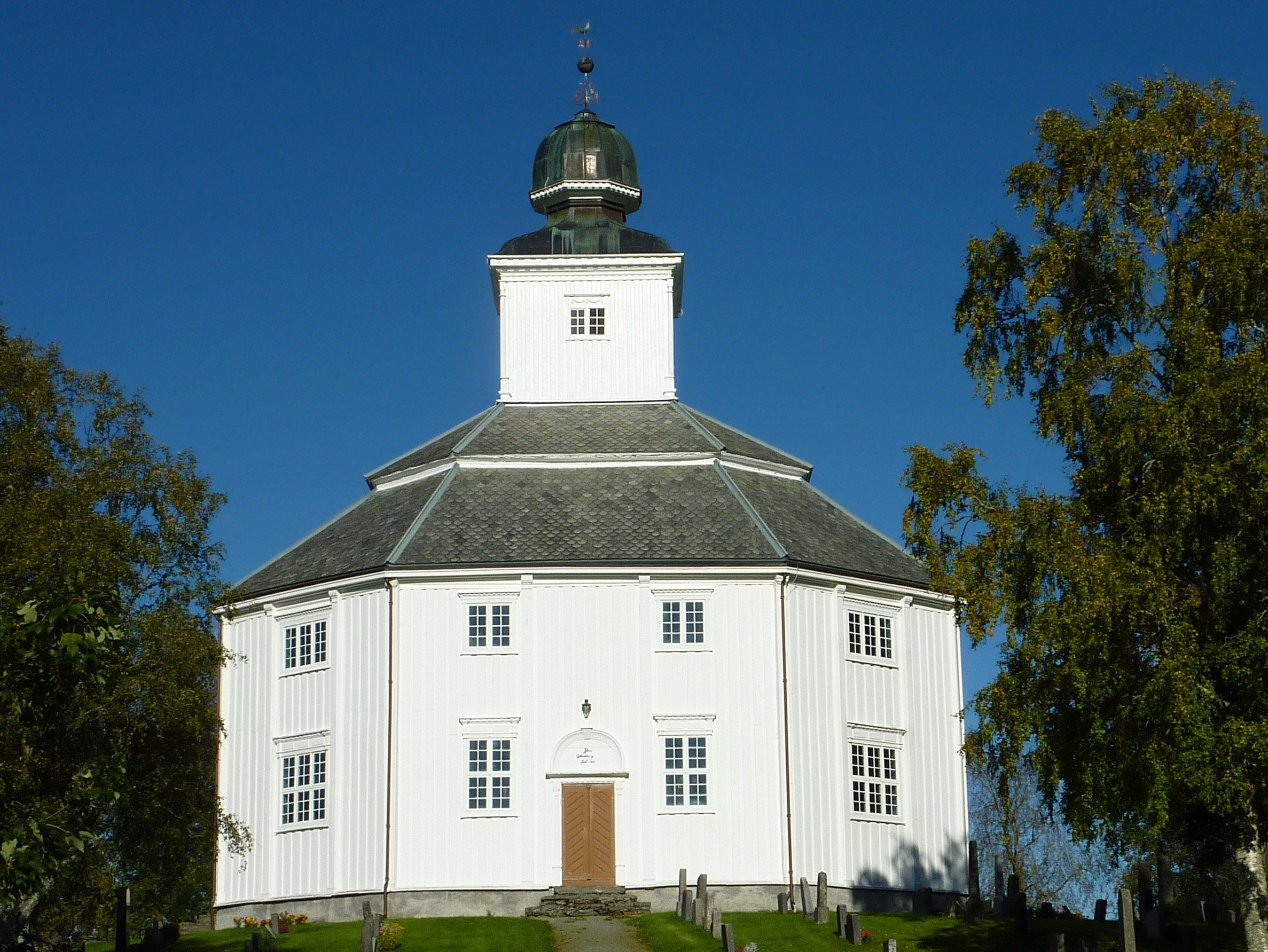

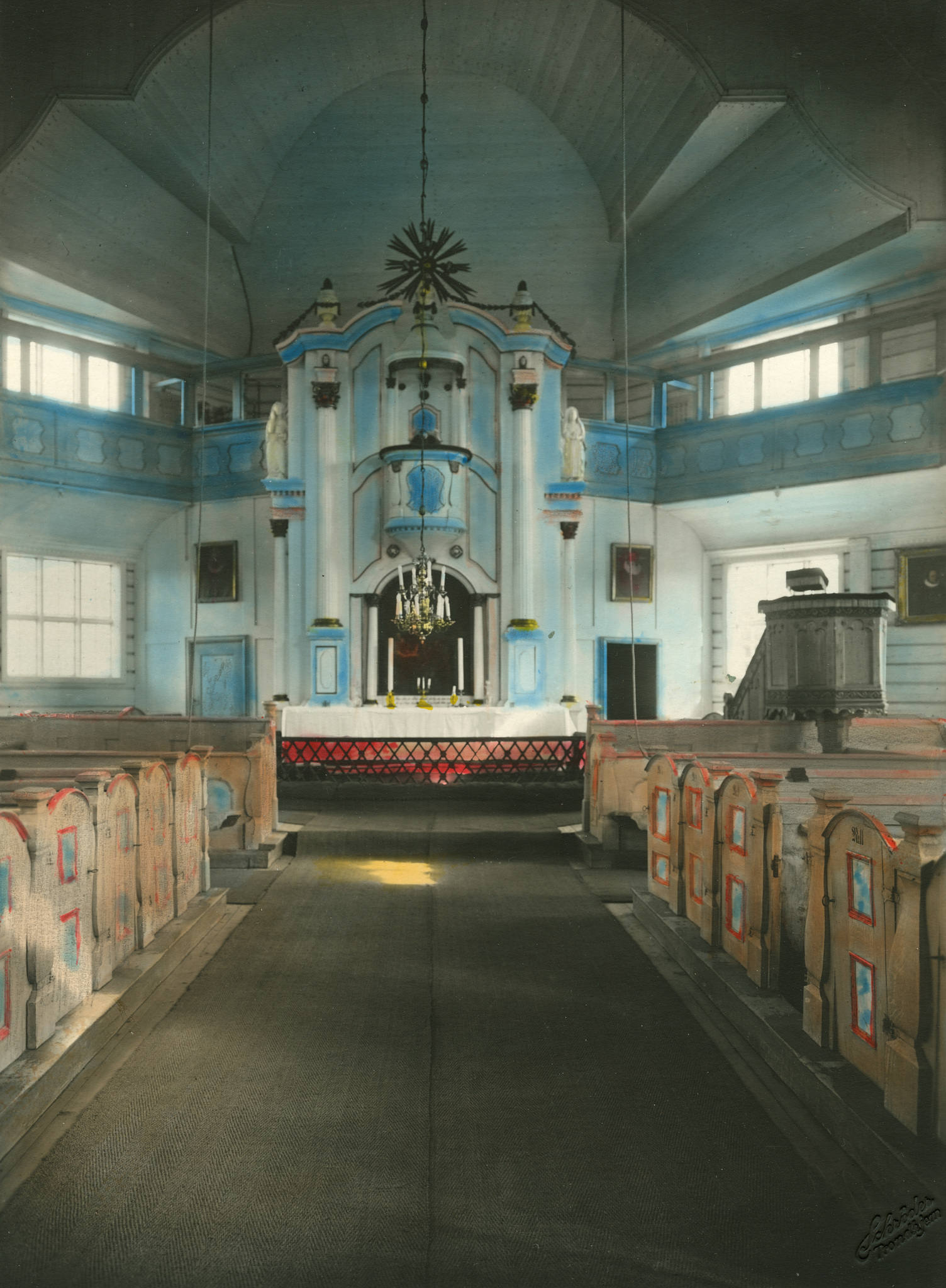

== See also ==
- List of churches in Nidaros
