= Vassfjellet =

Mountain in Trøndelag, Norway

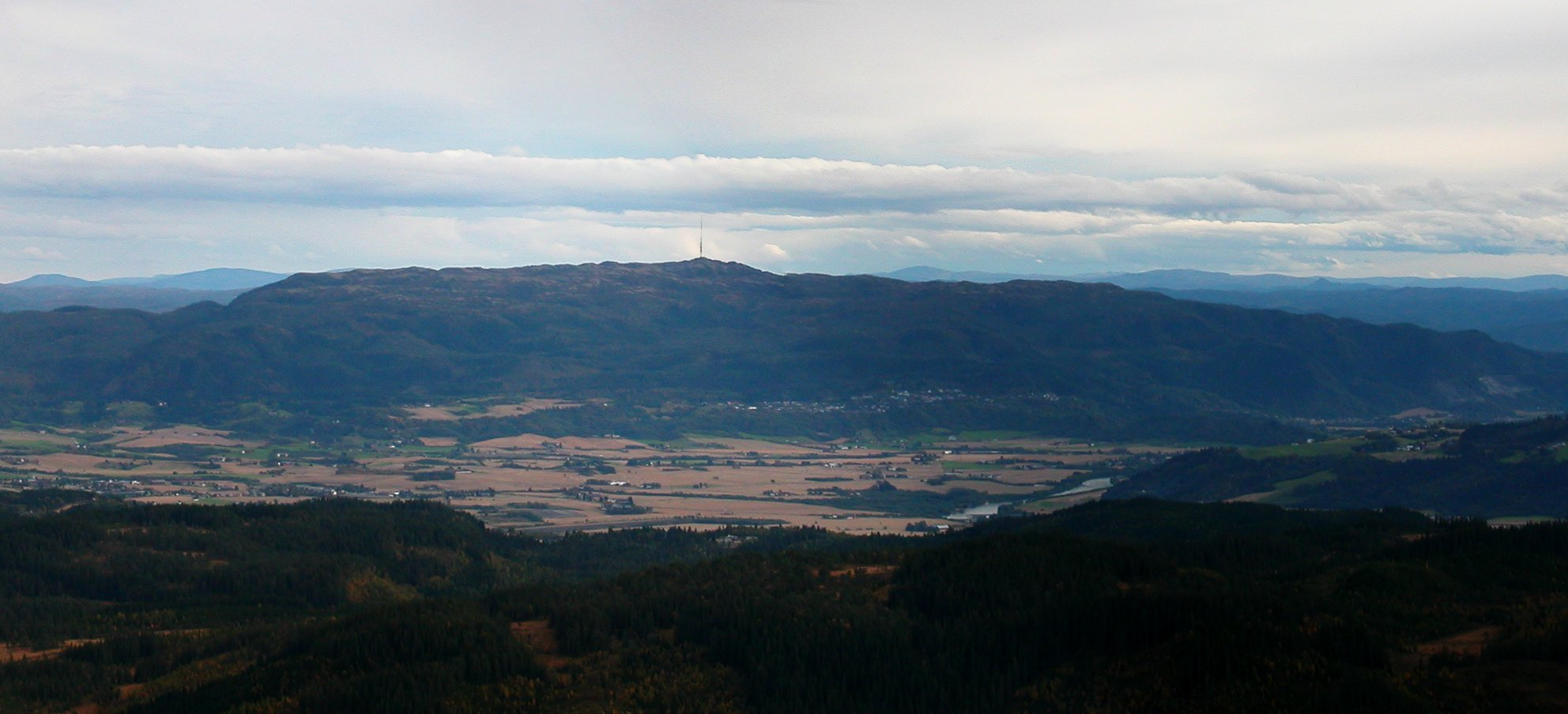
- Vassfjellet seen from Storheia (northwest)

Highest point
- Elevation: 710 m (2,330 ft)
- Prominence: 510 m (1,670 ft)
- Coordinates: 63.2618°N 10.3561°E

Geography
- Interactive map of the mountain
- Location: Trøndelag, Norway
- Topo map(s): 1621 IV Trondheim and 1621 III Støren

Climbing
- Easiest route: Road

Vassfjellet is a mountain on the border of Melhus Municipality and Trondheim Municipality in Trøndelag county, Norway. The eastern side of the mountain hosts a ski resort, Vassfjellet Skisenter. The 710-metre (2,330 ft) tall mountain lies about 4 kilometres (2.5 mi) southeast of the village of Melhus.

At the top there is a radio and television transmitting tower, which extends 220 metres (720 ft) above the top of the tall mountain. A road leading to the top has been built for maintenance access to the tower. This road starts in the village of Kvål in Melhus Municipality, but is closed to public vehicle access. It is however an excellent route for hiking.

The Vassfjell Chapel is located on the northeast side of the mountain in Trondheim Municipality.

== Name ==
The first element is the genitive case of vatn which means "water", "lake", or "tarn". The last element is the finite form of fjell which means "mountain". (There is a small tarn near the top of Vassfjellet.)

== See also ==
- List of tallest structures in Norway
