= Klæbu (village) =

Village in Trondheim Municipality, Norway

- Village
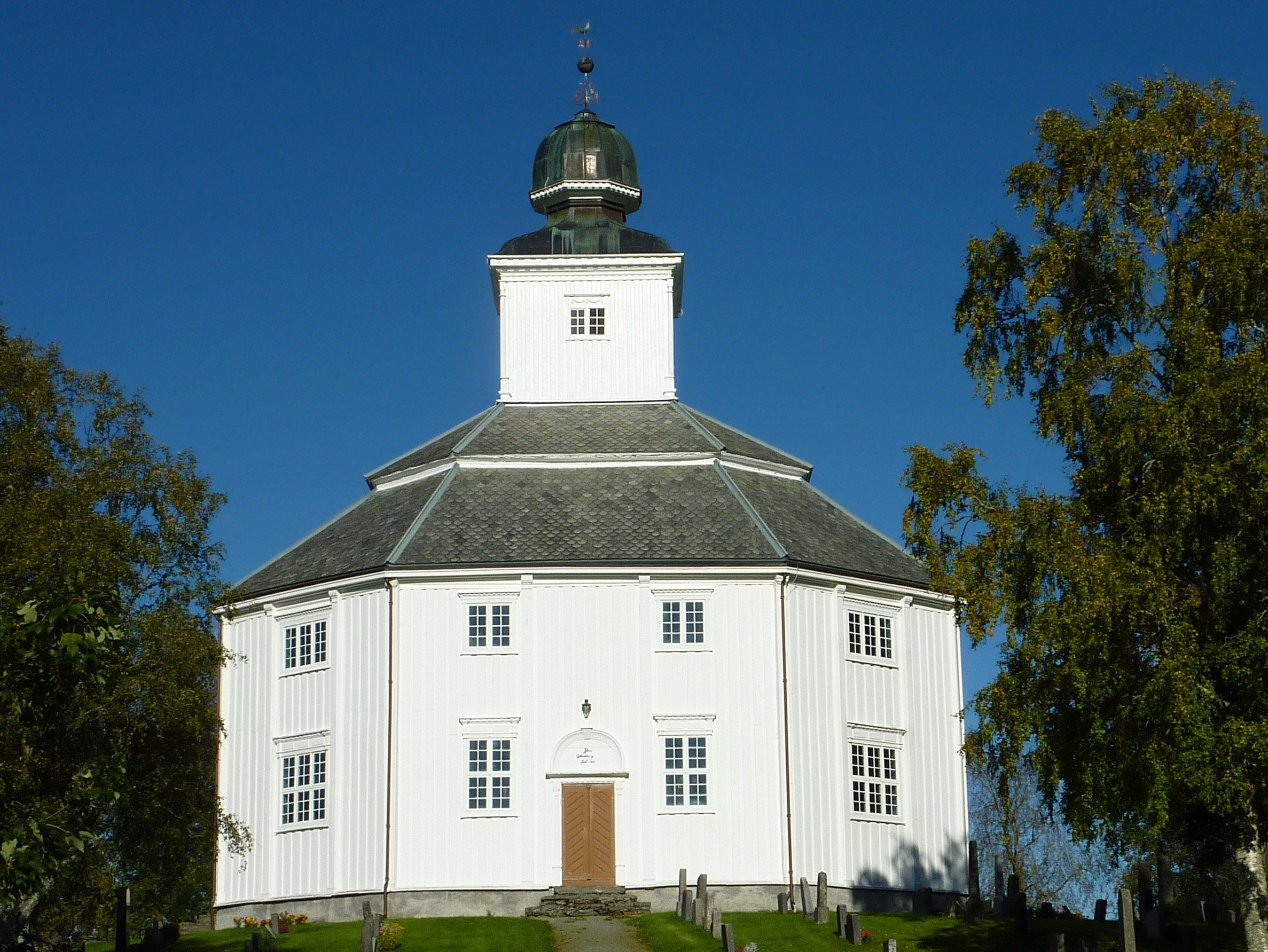
- View of the local church
- Interactive map of Klæbu
- Location within Trøndelag Location within Norway
- Coordinates: 63.2976°N 10.4826°E
- Country: Norway
- Region: Central Norway
- County: Trøndelag
- Municipality: Trondheim Municipality
- Borough: Heimdal

Area
  - Total: 1.5 km^{2} (0.58 sq mi)
- Elevation: 140 m (460 ft)

Population (2024)
  - Total: 3,545
  - Density: 2,363/km^{2} (6,120/sq mi)
- Time zone: UTC+01:00 (CET)
  - Summer (DST): UTC+02:00 (CEST)
- Post Code: 7540 Klæbu

Klæbu is a village in Trondheim Municipality in Trøndelag county, Norway. The village is located on the eastern shore of the river Nidelva, about 2 kilometres (1.2 mi) east of the village of Tanem and about 15 kilometres (9.3 mi) south of the city of Trondheim.

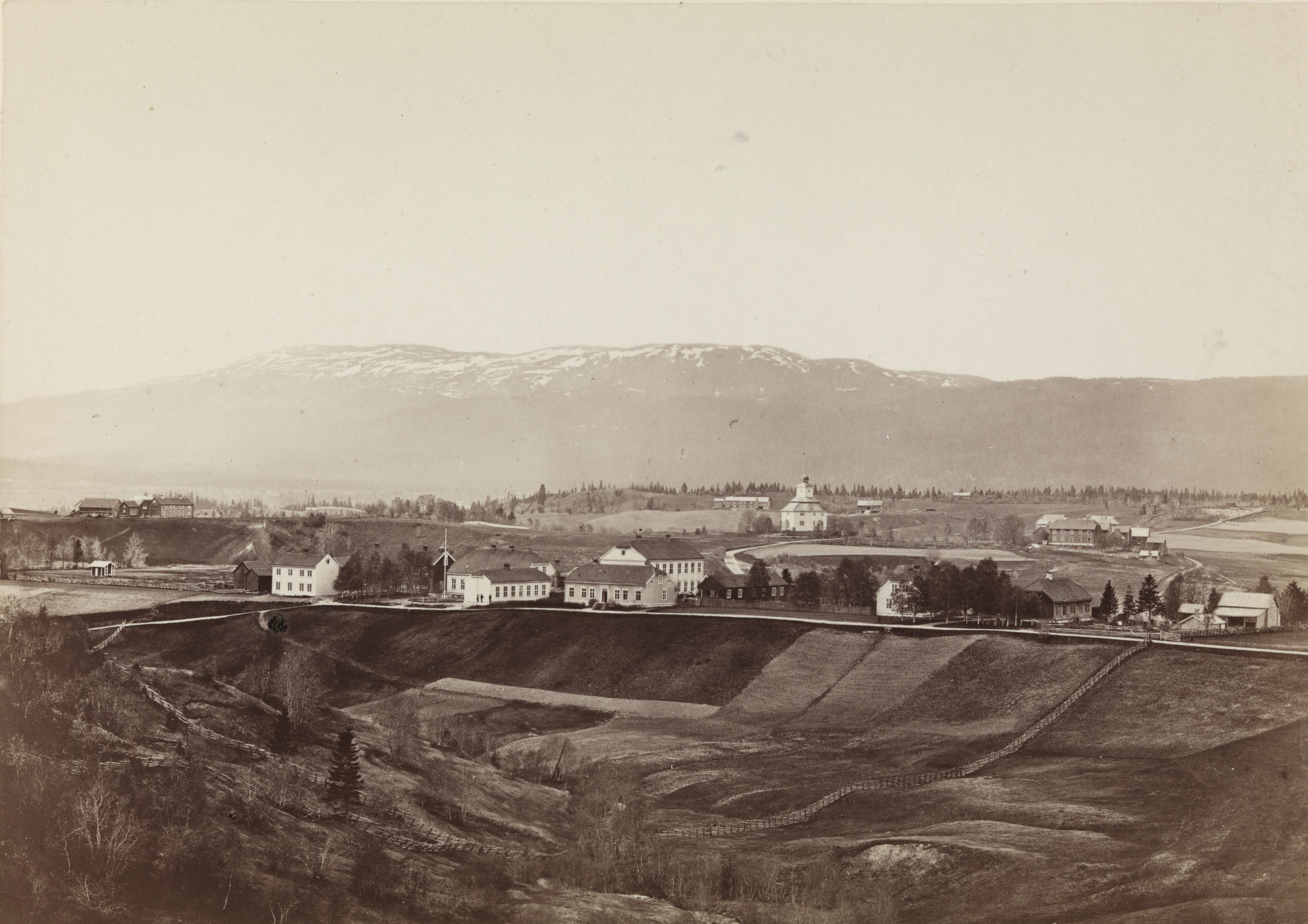
View of Klæbu in the late 19th century.

The village sits at the junction of Norwegian county roads 805 and 921. The historic Klæbu Church is located in the village.

The 1.5-square-kilometre (370-acre) village has a population (2024) of 3,545 and a population density of 2,363 inhabitants per square kilometre (6,120/sq mi).

The newspaper KlæbuPosten is published in Klæbu.

== History ==
The village was the administrative centre of the old Klæbu Municipality which existed from 1838 until 2020 when it was merged into Trondheim Municipality.
