= Mathias Dugstad =

Norwegian politician (1844–1929)

Mathias Gotskalksen Dugstad (20 January 1844 – 5 April 1929) was a Norwegian farmer and politician.

He was born in Voss Municipality, Norway, as a son of farmer and politician Gotskalk Mathiassen Seim and Ingeborg Olsdatter née Fladekval. Both his father and paternal grandfather Mathias Gotskalksen Ringheim were members or deputies in Parliament. Mathias Dugstad took secondary education, but spent his career at the family farm Dugstad, being its owner from 1873 to 1906. He married Brita Nilsdatter Nesthus.

Dugstad was a member of the municipal council of Voss Municipality from 1876 to 1901 and served as mayor from 1878 to 1889. He was also director of the savings bank Voss Sparebank.

He was elected to the Parliament of Norway from Søndre Bergenhus amt in 1885, 1888, 1891 and 1894. He represented the Moderate Liberal Party and was a member of the Lagting during his last three terms. Lastly he served as a deputy representative during the term 1903–1906. He died in 1929.
