= Theodor Nilsen Stousland =

Norwegian politician

Theodor Nilsen Stousland (16 March 1842 – 7 April 1910) was a Norwegian politician for the Liberal Party.

He was elected to the Norwegian Parliament from the constituency Lister og Mandal amt in 1889, representing the Moderate Liberal Party. He then joined the Liberal Party and was re-elected three times, before serving as a deputy representative during the term 1900–1903. He then returned, being re-elected three more times.

Born in Søgne, he was a member of the municipal council of Søgne Municipality from 1874 to 1893, serving as mayor from 1880 to 1885.

He mainly worked as a farmer, but was also treasurer in the local bank from 1875 to 1893, county auditor from 1882 to 1886 and bailiff from 1893 to 1899. Towards the end of his career he worked at the Office of the Auditor General of Norway.
