= Magne Johnsen Rongved =

Norwegian politician

Magne Johnsen Rognved (27 June 1858 - 28 October 1933) was a Norwegian politician for the Moderate Liberal Party and the Liberal Party.

He was elected to the Norwegian Parliament in 1904, representing the constituency of Søndre Bergenhus Amt. He had served as a deputy representative during the term 1900–1903, and returned as a deputy in 1913–1915. He represented the Moderate Liberal Party in the first two terms.

Born in Haus Municipality, Rongved first had a career in the military before returning to his home on the island of Osterøy in 1909 to serve as police sergeant in the village of Hammer. Besides this, he worked as a farmer. He was mayor of Haus Municipality for twelve years.

He married three times.
