= Demographics of Western Norway =

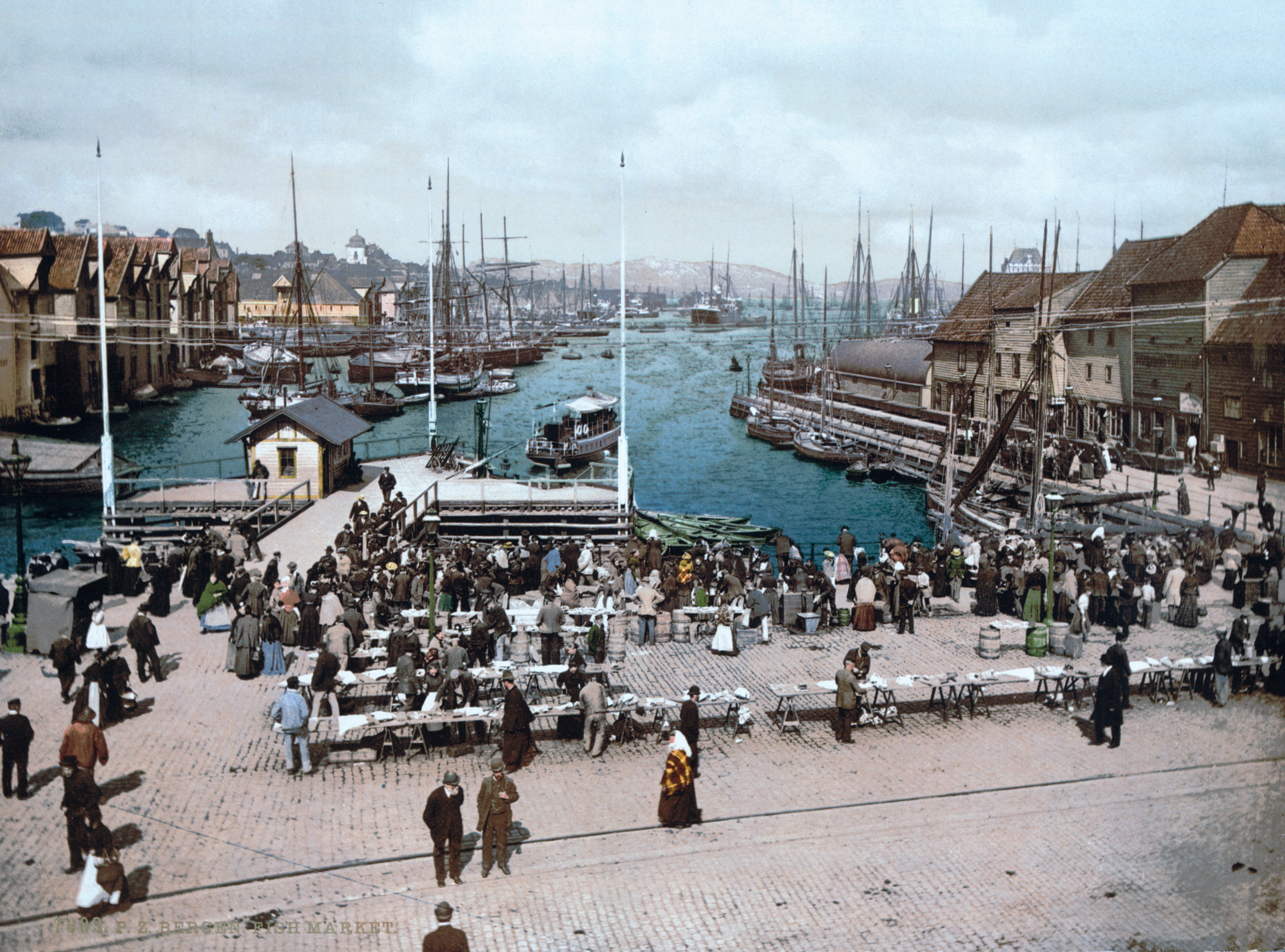
A picture from Bergen Municipality fish market, taken between 1890 and 1905

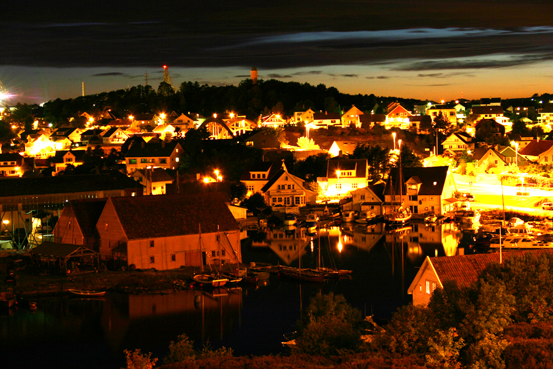
Buøy, a neighbourhood in Stavanger Municipality

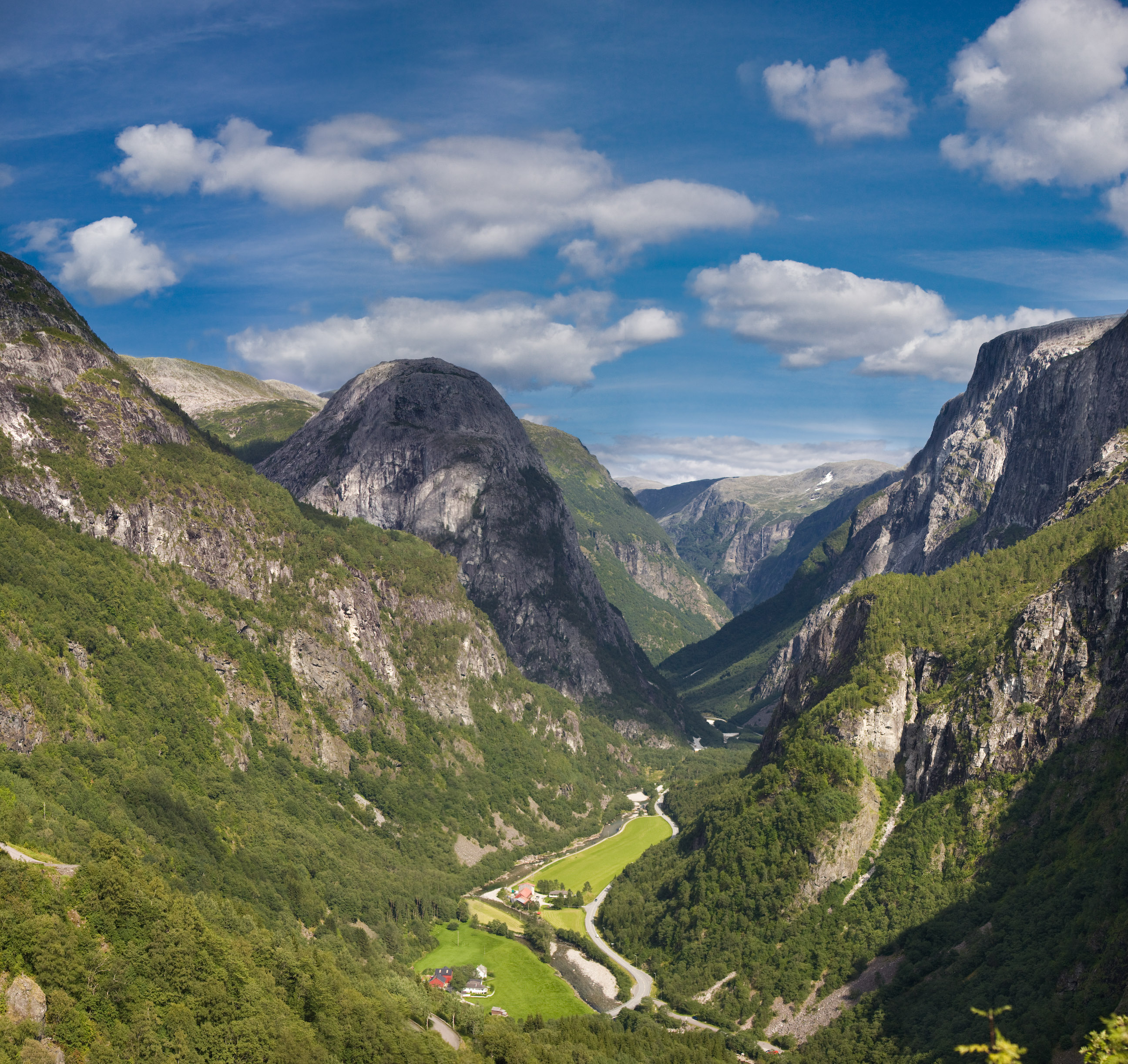
Some parts of western Norway have small populations, such as here at Stalheim, Voss Municipality.

The Western Norway region of Norway showed the highest population growth rate in Norway in 2010, at 1.44%. The fertility rate in this region is higher than in other parts of Norway. The population as of 1 January 2010 was 1,263,464, with 37.7% of the population living in Hordaland, 33.8% in Rogaland, 19.8% in Møre og Romsdal, and 8.4% in Sogn og Fjordane. 60% of the population is under 40 years old, and 30% is under 20 years old. Many of the historical immigrants in Western Norway came from countries like Scotland, England, Netherlands, Germany, Denmark and Sweden. Western Norway is the part of Norway which has the largest immigration from the western world.

The following demographic statistics are from the Statistics Norway, unless otherwise indicated.

== Historical population ==
Historical population
Year	Pop.	±%
1769	193,259	—
1801	230,053	+19.0%
1855	392,588	+70.7%
1900	560,765	+42.8%
1950	811,411	+44.7%
1955	846,977	+4.4%
1960	887,537	+4.8%
1965	919,909	+3.6%
1970	961,676	+4.5%
1975	1,002,465	+4.2%
1980	1,033,902	+3.1%
1985	1,061,367	+2.7%
1990	1,089,763	+2.7%
1995	1,124,756	+3.2%
2000	1,159,176	+3.1%
2001	1,164,937	+0.5%
2002	1,170,763	+0.5%
2003	1,178,263	+0.6%
2004	1,185,699	+0.6%
2005	1,193,168	+0.6%
2006	1,201,833	+0.7%
2007	1,212,856	+0.9%
2008	1,228,392	+1.3%
2009	1,245,439	+1.4%
2010	1,263,464	+1.4%
2015?	1,330,975	+5.3%
2020?	1,397,393	+5.0%
2025?	1,464,086	+4.8%
2030?	1,525,853	+4.2%
Source: Statistics Norway .

== Age and sex distribution ==
=== Age structure ===
==== Norway ====
(2010 estimate)
0–14 years: 18.9% (male 470,253; female 447,472)
15–64 years: 66.2% (male 1,641,821; female 1,575,980)
65 years and over: 14.9% (male 314,678; female 407,995)

==== Western Norway ====
(2010 estimate)
0–14 years: 19.9% (male 128,405; female 123,094)
15–64 years: 65.8% (male 429,302; female 401,410)
65 years and over: 14.3% (male 79,008; female 102,245)

=== Population ===
  - 1,159,176 (1 January 2000)
  - 1,263,464 (1 January 2010)
- Population growth
  - 104,288 (8.9%)
  - 1,263,464 (1 January 2010)
  - 1,397,393 (1 January 2020)
- Population growth
  - 133,929 (10.6%)
  - 1,397,393 (1 January 2020)
  - 1,525,853 (1 January 2030)
- Population growth
  - 128,460 (9.1%)

=== Population – comparative ===
Slightly larger than East Timor and Eswatini, but slightly smaller than Hawaii and Estonia.

=== Population growth rate ===
1.44% (in 2010)

=== Population growth rate – comparative ===
Slightly larger than El Salvador and Iran, but slightly smaller than India.

=== Births and deaths ===
	Births	Deaths	Birth surplus	Birth rate	Death rate	Net migration rate
2000	16,345	10,405	5,940	14.1	8.9	-0.1
2008	16,644	10,028	6,616	13.5	8.1	8.5

=== Life expectancy at birth ===
(2008)
total population: 80.4 years
male: 77.8 years
female: 83.0 years

=== Total fertility rate ===
Western Norway has a higher fertility rate than Iran, Iceland, France and the United States, and it is the highest in Norway.

County	Fertility rate (2009)
Rogaland	2.18
Møre og Romsdal	2.13
Sogn og Fjordane	2.10
Hordaland	2.03

=== Literacy ===
definition: age 15 and over can read and write
total population: 100%
male: NA%
female: NA%

== Immigration ==
Country of origin	Norway	Immigrants	Eastern Europe	Asia	Western Europe	Africa	Nordic countries	Latin America	North America	Oceania	Total
Population	1,148,324	115,140	35,913	33,154	16,726	11,085	10,103	5,082	2,588	489	1,263,464
Percent of total	90.88%	9.11%	2.84%	2.62%	1.32%	0.87%	0.79%	0.40%	0.20%	0.03%	100%
Percent of immigrants		100%	31.19%	28.79%	14.52%	9.62%	8.77%	4.41%	2.24%	0.42%	9.11%

Country of origin	Norway	Immigrants	Asia	Eastern Europe	Western Europe	Africa	Nordic countries	Latin America	North America	Oceania	Total
Hordaland	434,081	42,374	12,292	13,065	5,325	4,740	3,405	2,497	872	178	477,175
Rogaland	378,956	48,991	14,989	14,334	7,465	4,391	4,447	1,758	1,370	237	427,947
Møre og Romsdal	234,477	16,785	6,143	4,338	2,680	1,287	1,541	496	243	57	251,262
Sogn og Fjordane	100,090	6,990	2,489	1,417	1,256	667	710	331	103	17	107,080

=== Immigrants in Bergen and Stavanger ===
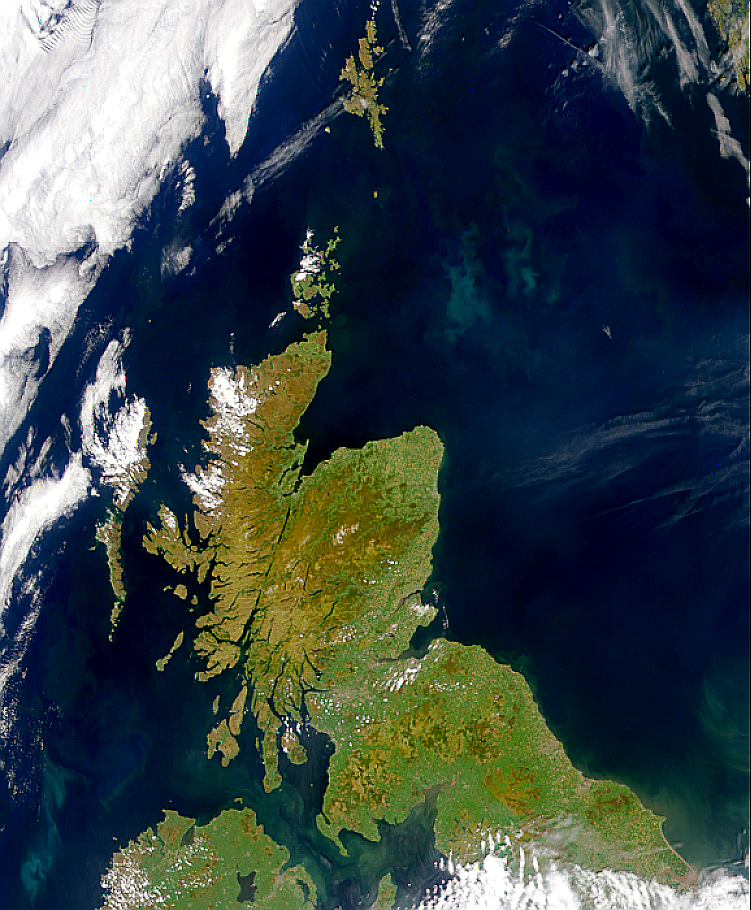
Many people had emigrated from the neighbour to the west, Scotland.

Country	Inhabitants
Total	380,450
Ethnic Norwegians	331,209
Immigrants	49,241
Poland	5,085
United Kingdom	2,336
Iraq	2,067
Germany	1,890
Vietnam	1,827
Sweden	1,780
Turkey	1,769
Somalia	1,746
Denmark	1,382
Bosnia and Herzegovina	1,327

== Religion ==
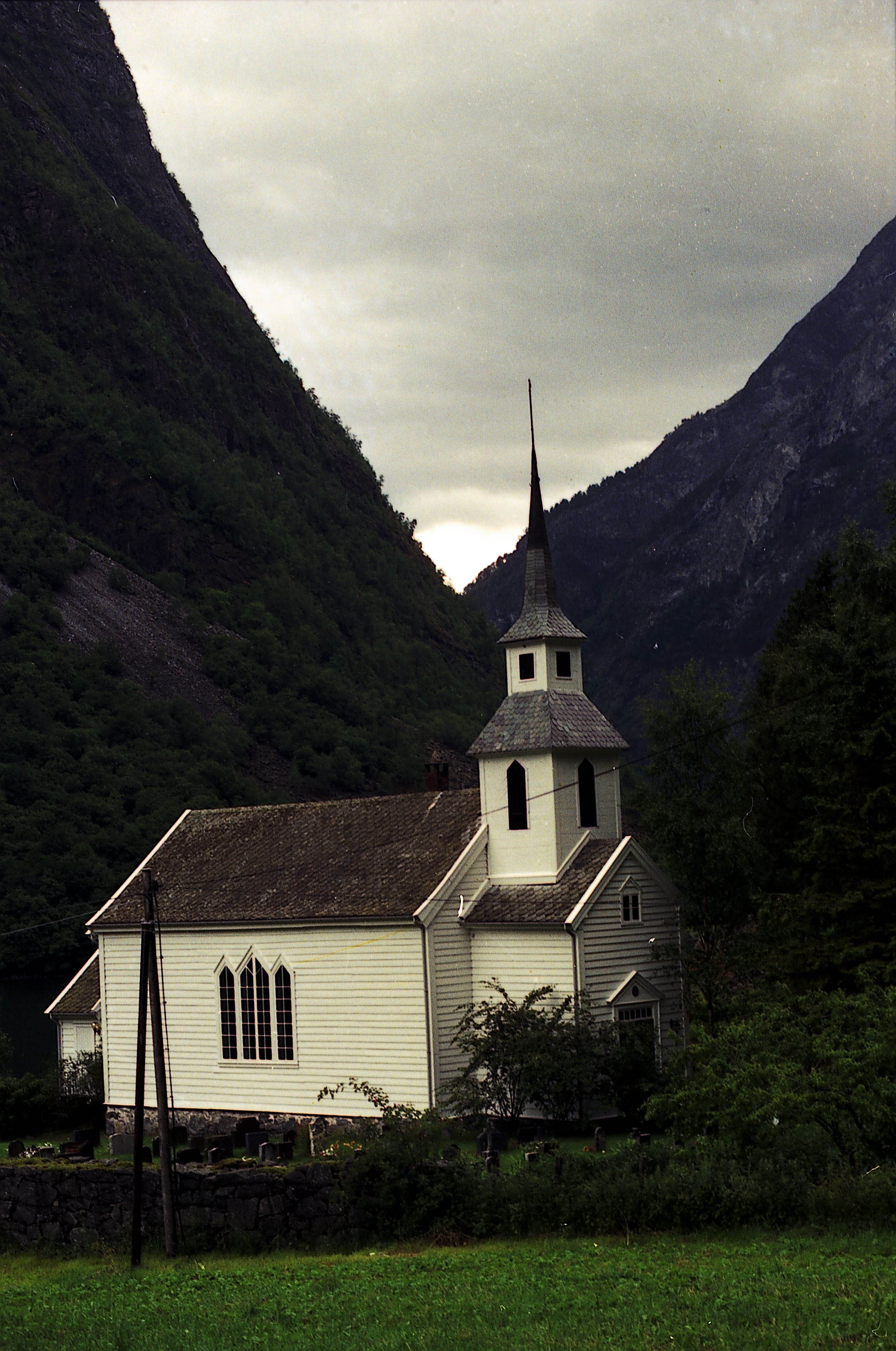
Bakka Church in Aurland Municipality, Sogn.

Religion in Western Norway
religion	percent
Christianity	88.65%
Irreligion	10.23%
Islam	0.85%
Buddhism	0.16%
Baháʼí Faith, Judaism, Sikhism	0.11%

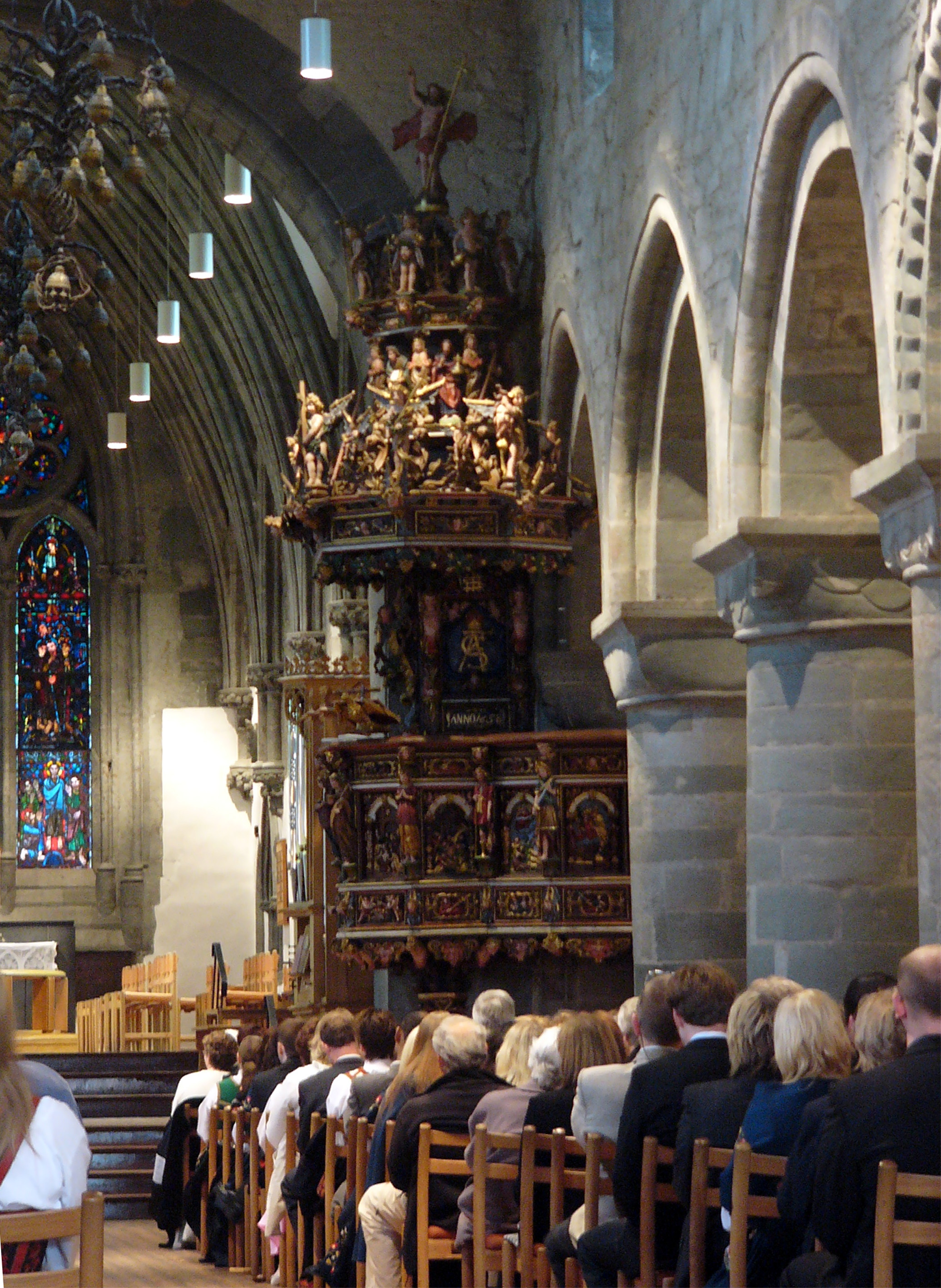
A liturgy in Stavanger Cathedral.

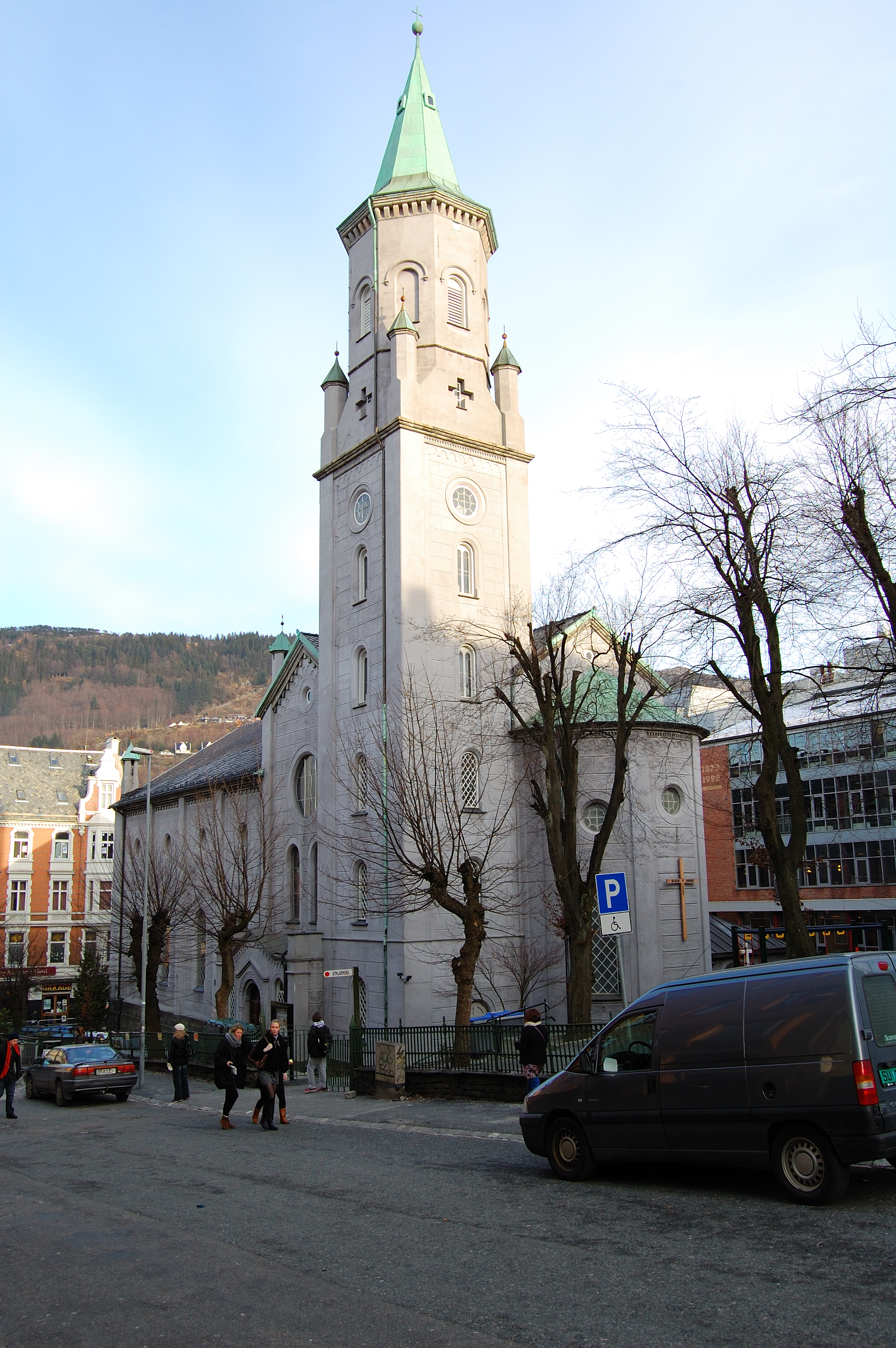
Saint Paul Church, a Catholic church in Western Norway.

Christianity is the largest religion. 1,054,573 people are members of the Church of Norway. There is also 52,365 members in other Christian churches. Islam has 10,685 adherents in Western Norway, Buddhism has 2,082. 1,171 are of the Baháʼí Faith, Judaism, Sikhism and other religions.

There are more than thousand Protestant churches (in all municipalities), six Catholic churches (in Bergen, Stavanger, Haugesund, Ålesund, Molde and Kristiansund), two mosques (in Bergen and Stavanger), two Orthodox churches (in Bergen and Stavanger), and one Hindu temple (in Bergen).

The name "Bible Belt" has been applied historically to the Southern and Western parts of Norway. The region thus defined included most of Western Norway, especially Rogaland, Møre og Romsdal and some parts of Hordaland. Notably absent from this belt are bigger cities like Bergen and Stavanger where many people identify themselves as non-religious or with other religions. In these areas the conservative branch of the Church of Norway has a stronghold and the members usually associate themselves to Indremisjonen (Inner Mission). There are also numerous Pentecostals and members of the Free Churches, but these movements are also strongly represented in the rest of the country. The Bible Belt in Norway traditionally reflects the support for the Christian Democratic Party. However, especially since the first decade of the 21st century, conservative bible belt Christians unhappy with the more liberal development of the party have increasingly turned to the Progress Party.

=== Christianity ===
Christianity is the largest religious group. Although more and more ethnic Norwegians are less religious, Christian immigrants have increased the population. Many known Christian missionaries came from Western Norway, for example Torill Selsvold Nyborg, who is now the county mayor of Hordaland.

Year	2006	2007	2008	2009
Christianity in Western Norway	1,099,277	1,103,804	1,105,047	1,104,127
Percent	91.4%	91.0%	89.9%	88.6%

==== Protestantism ====
Year	2005	2006	2007	2008	2009
Members of the Church of Norway	1,062,634	1,051,209	1,053,114	1,054,573	1,051,762
Percent of total population	89.0%	87.4%	86.8%	85.8%	84.4%

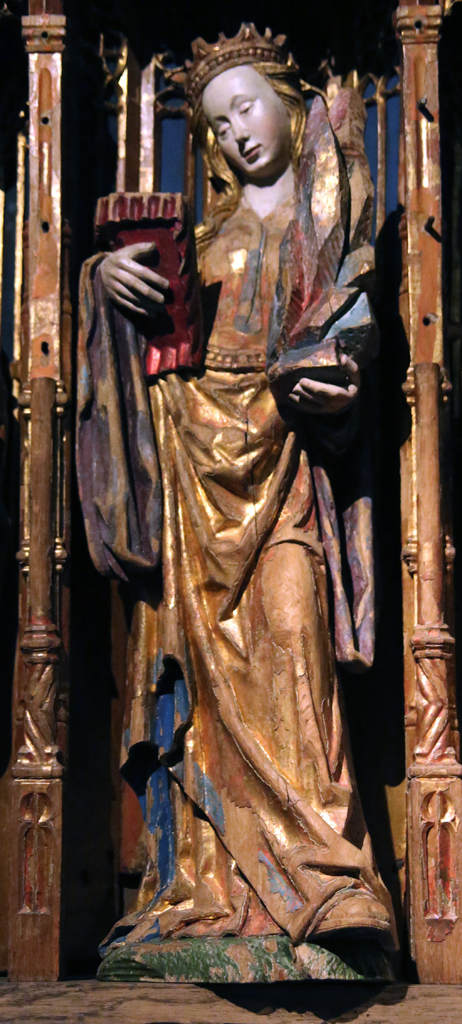
Statue of Saint Sunniva, the patron saint of the Norwegian Diocese of Bjørgvin. According to legend, Sunniva was the heir of an Irish kingdom, but had to flee when a heathen king, who wanted to marry her, invaded. At the Norwegian island of Selja, in the present-day Stad Municipality, she and her followers took refuge in a cave. The locals suspected the foreigners of stealing their sheep, and the ruler Håkon Jarl was sent for. Sunniva and her followers prayed to God that they should not fall into the hands of the heathens, upon which rocks fell down blocking the entrance to the cave.

Protestantism is the majority religion in Norway. Most Norwegians are Lutheran and members of the Church of Norway. Over 85% of the population is member here. Every municipalities have Protestant churches. Many municipalities, for example Austevoll Municipality, a small municipality with around 4,000 inhabitants, have over 13 church buildings. Most Norwegians are not active in the church. Nevertheless, there are many who participate to worship at Christmas Eve. People outside the cities are often more religious than the population in the cities, although there are many religious Christians immigrants in the cities.

==== Catholicism ====
Catholicism increased its members in Western Norway due to immigration from Poland, the Philippines, Chile, and other Latin American and European countries. There are six Catholic churches (as of 2004), in Bergen (4,925 members), Stavanger (2,863 members), Haugesund (822 members), Ålesund (595 members), Molde (289) and Kristiansund (212). The largest church is St. Paul church in Bergen. The number of Catholics increased rapidly from 2005, because of immigration (mainly Polish). The capacity in the region is too small for all Catholics, and it is therefore planned to build several Catholic churches in the region, in addition to Orthodox churches.

Year	1995	2000	2004
Members in the Catholic Church	7,760	8,721	9,706
Percent	0.68%	0.75%	0.81%

==== Orthodoxy ====
There are only two Orthodox congregations in Western Norway, in Bergen and Stavanger. 368 people are members in Stavanger, but not all of them live in Rogaland. Congregations in some churches in Bergen have Orthodox worship in different languages. The numbers of Orthodox Christians in the region due to increased immigration from countries such as Russia and the rest of Eastern Europe.

==== Smaller denominations ====
- 9,803 people are Pentecostals.
- 3,876 people are Jehovah's Witnesses, up from 3,872 in 2003.
- 3,692 people are Methodists.
- 1,949 people are Baptists, up from 1,880 in 2003.
- 1,314 people are members in the Norwegian Mission Association.
- 1,086 people are members in the Seventh-day Adventist Church.

=== Islam ===
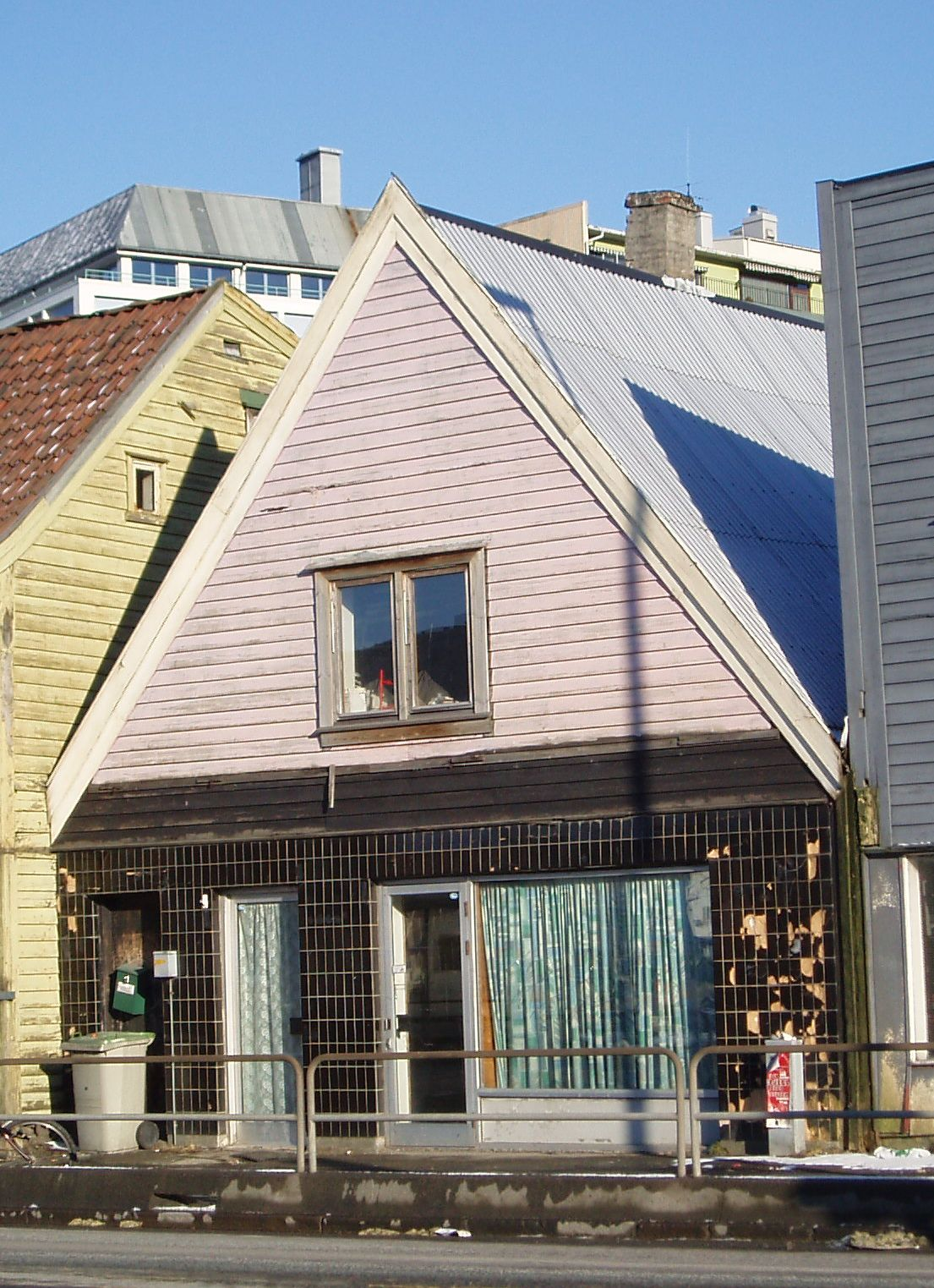
The mosque of The Islamic Association of Bergen (Det Islamske Forbundet i Bergen), like most Norwegian mosques situated in a regular town house.

While as many as 7.2% of Oslo's population are Muslims, this figure is only 0.85% in Western Norway. There are two mosques, one in Bergen and Stavanger. In total, 10,685 people members of this religious community.

Year	2006	2007	2008	2009
Islam in Western Norway	8,697	9,540	9,578	10,685
Percent	0.72%	0.78%	0.77%	0.85%

=== Buddhism ===
Buddhism increased its number of adherents from 0 in 2004 to 2,082 in 2009.

Year	2006	2007	2008	2009
Buddhism in Western Norway	1,489	1,583	1,689	2,082
Percent	0.12%	0.13%	0.13%	0.16%

=== Others ===
Year	2006	2007	2008	2009
Baháʼí Faith, Judaism, Sikhism in Western Norway	1,140	1,181	1,171	1,397
Percent	0.09%	0.09%	0.09%	0.11%

==== Judaism ====
Western Norway has a small Jewish community. There has never been a synagogue in this part of the country, but before World War II, there was one congregation in Bergen and one in Kristiansund.

== See also ==
- List of regions of Norway
