= Moderate Liberal Party =

Moderate Liberal Party Moderate Venstre
- Founded: 1888
- Dissolved: 1906
- Split from: Liberal Party
- Merged into: Conservative Party
- Newspaper: Vestlands-Posten; Stavanger Aftenblad; Folketidende (from 1887); Framgang (from 1894)
- Ideology: Christian democracy Social conservatism Pietistic revivalism Unionism (from 1893)
- Political position: Centre
- National affiliation: Coalition Party (1903–06)

The Moderate Liberal Party (Norwegian: Moderate Venstre, literally "Moderate Left") was a political party in Norway that emerged from the moderate and religious branches of the Liberal Party in 1888. The party's turn towards cooperation with the Conservative Party caused a party split in 1891, eventually sharpening its profile as a moderate-conservative party based among the low church of south-western Norway. The party was dissolved shortly after the dissolution of the union with Sweden in 1905.

== History ==
The Moderate Liberal Party was formed on 4 February 1888, when a conservative and religious wing broke away from the Liberal Party. Leading members of the party included Jakob Sverdrup, Baard Haugland, Ole Vollan, and Lars Oftedal. The political conflicts between the Liberals and Conservatives in 1891 resulted in a split among the Moderates themselves, with the more left-leaning Moderates returning to the mother party. The split resulted in a more uniformed profile as the remaining party sharpened its opposition against the "pure" Liberals and became more supportive towards the Conservatives.

In the mid-1890s, the party's central goal became to work against the Liberals' increasingly radical policy of challenging the union with Sweden, granting the population general voting rights, and introducing direct state taxes. The split of 1891 also caused the party to become more firmly based among the revivalist low church of south-western Norway. As such, other important issues for the party included temperance, religion and moral, while it took centrist stands in regards to social and economical questions. The party gained an eastern Norway counterpart in 1893 by the party Centre, the "Eastern Moderates", and for a brief time there was talks of a merger between the two parties.

From 1895 to 1898, the party was represented in Hagerup's First Cabinet. In 1903, the party joined the Coalition Party alongside the Conservatives. It was part of Michelsen's Cabinet during the dissolution of the union with Sweden, from 1905 until 1906 when it effectively merged into the Conservative Party after the introduction of single-member districts. Magnus Halvorsen is however registered under the Moderate Liberal label as Minister of Finance in Løvland's Cabinet from 1907 to 1908. The party had never developed any strong party organisation, functioning more as a vehicle for individual representatives.

The party has sometimes been described as a Christian democratic predecessor to the modern Christian Democratic Party, which was founded in 1933.

== MPs elected ==
- Niri Guldbrandsen Kolkinn (1889–1891)
- Christian Johansen Ihlen (1889–1891)
- Peder Johan Pedersen Holmesland (1889–1891)
- Søren Pedersen Jaabæk (1889–1891)
- Theodor Nilsen Stousland (1889–1900)
- Peder Tobias Eiesland (1889–1891)
- Aasmund Halvorsen Vinje (1889–1906)
- Jonas Mikal Olsen Ueland (1889–1900)
- Olaus Olsen Eskeland (1889–1891)
- Njeld Larsen Kolbenstvedt (1889–1891)
- Ole Osmundsen Berge (1889–1891)
- Nikolai Larsen Lima (1889–1897)
- Mathias Gotskalksen Dugstad (1889–1897)
- Ole Johannessen Veseth (1889–1891)
- Andreas Johannessen Lavik (1889–1891)
- Nils Nilsson Skaar (1889–1894)
- Johannes Olsen Helleland (1889–1891)
- Iver Jonassen Svendsbøe (1889–1897)
- Arne Olsen Tonning (1889–1894)
- Gjert Martines Markvarsen Holsen (1889–1891)
- Edvard Apolloniussen Liljedahl (1889–1891)
- Jakob Jakobsen Myklebust (1889–1891)
- Henrik Mohn Dahl (1889–1891)
- Anfinn Larsen Refsdal (1889–1900)
- Peder Ferdinand Reinhardt (1889–1891)
- Lars Oftedahl (1889–1894)
- Ole Jacob Louis Sparre (1889–1891)
- Johannes Andreas Henschien (1892–1894)
- Eilert Gerhard Schanche (1892–1900)
- Jakob Liv Rosted Sverdrup (1892–1897)
- Frederik Baltazar (Hillestad) Fraas (1892–1900)
- Jørgen Gunnarson Løvland (1892–1897)
- Thore Olsen Wølstad (1895–1903)
- Baard Madsen Haugland (1895–1897)
- Knut Andersen Taraldset (1895–1900)
- Poul Christian Pedersen (1895–1897)
- Johannes Ottersen Finstad (1898–1900)
- Johannes Martin Johannesen Furre (1898–1900)
- Lars Konrad Bjørnsen Jelsa (1901–1906)
- Peder Hansen (1901–1903)
- Eivind Hanssen Hognestad (1904–1906)
- Erik Kristensen Austbø (1904–1906)
- Magne Johnsen Rongved (1904–1906)
- Iver Jonassen Svendsbøe (1904–1906)
- Knut Andersen Taraldset (1904–1906)
- Frederik Baltazar (Sjøtun) Fraas (1904–1906)
- Adolf Theodor Pedersen (1904–1906)
- Hakon Magne Wrangell (1904–1906)

== Election results ==
| Date | Votes | Seats | | Size | Government |
| Date | % | # | ± | Size | Government |
|---|---|---|---|---|---|
| 1888 | 19.5% | 25 / 114 | ▲25 | 3rd | Opposition |
| 1891 | 49.2%* | 16 / 114 | ▼9 | 3rd | Opposition |
| 1894 | 49.3%* | 15 / 114 | ▼1 | 3rd | Minority (1895–1898) |
| 1897 | 46.7%* | 10 / 114 | ▼5 | 3rd | Opposition |
| 1900 | 40.8%* | 6 / 114 | ▼4 | 3rd | Opposition |
| 1903 | 44.8%* | 10 / 117 | ▲4 | 3rd | Minority (1905–1906) |

- *Indicates shared vote between the Moderate Liberals and Conservatives. Seats indicated are the Moderate Liberals alone.
