= Baard Madsen Haugland =

Norwegian politician

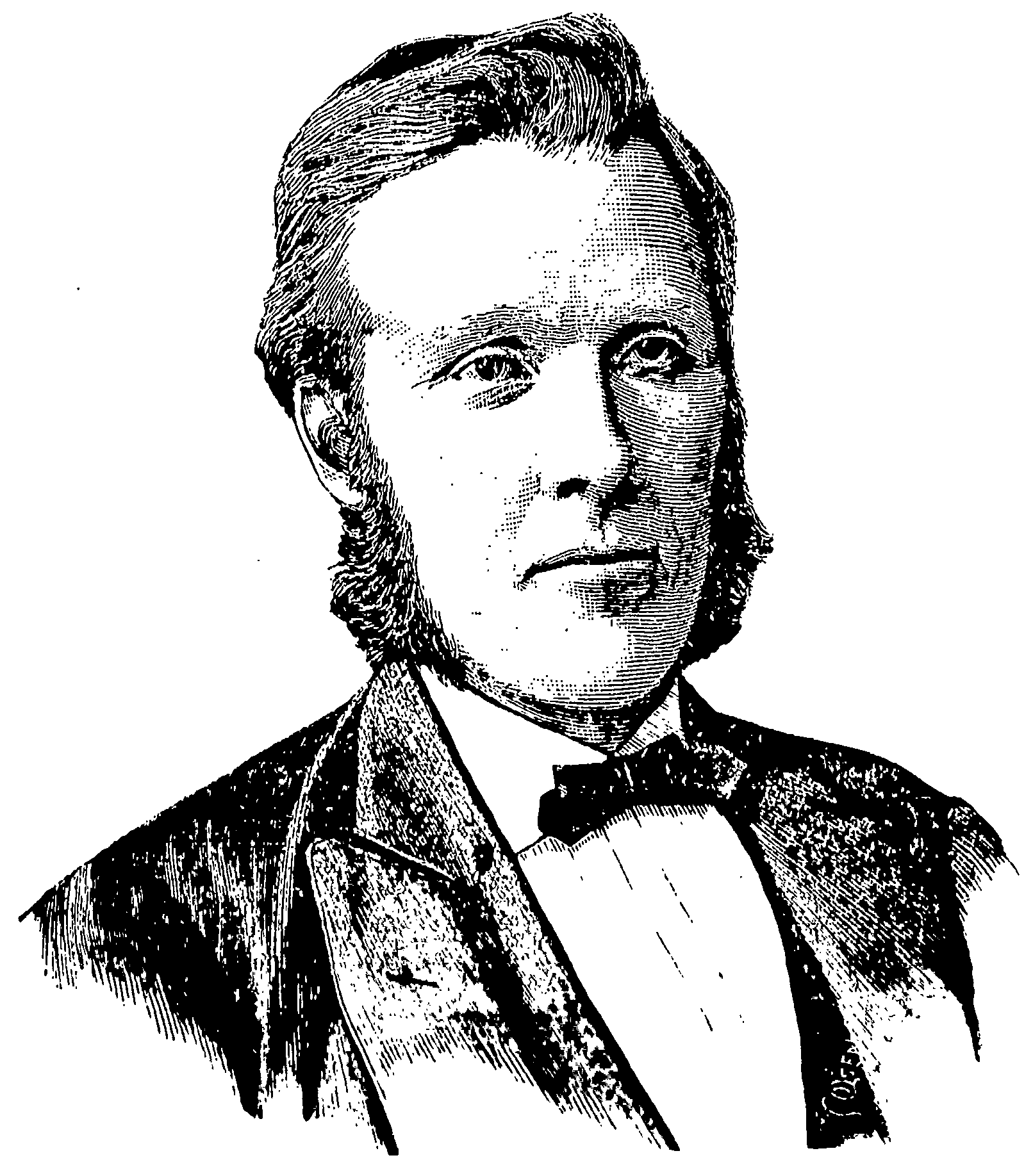
Baard Madsen Haugland

Baard Madsen Haugland (12 January 1835 – 7 May 1896) was a Norwegian merchant and politician with the Liberal Party.

== Biography ==
He was born at the Haugland farm on the island of Stord (Haugland på Stord) in Søndre Bergenhus, Norway. Haugland was a merchant by profession and worked in the trade business in Bergen from 1851 until 1884.

Haugland was mayor (ordførar) of Stordøen Municipality from 1864. In 1870, he entered the Norwegian Parliament as a representative of Søndre Bergenhus amt (now Hordaland). He was Minister of Finance 1884-1888 and member of the Council of State Division in Stockholm 1888-1889 and 1895-1896 under Prime Minister Johan Sverdrup.

Haugland was made a member of the Order of St. Olav in 1886 and received the Commander's Cross 1st class in 1895. He was also made a commander of the Order of the Polar Star. He died in Stockholm during the spring of 1896 and was buried at Vår Frelsers gravlund in Oslo.
