= 1900 Norwegian parliamentary election =

- 1900

All 114 seats in the Storting 57 seats needed for a majority
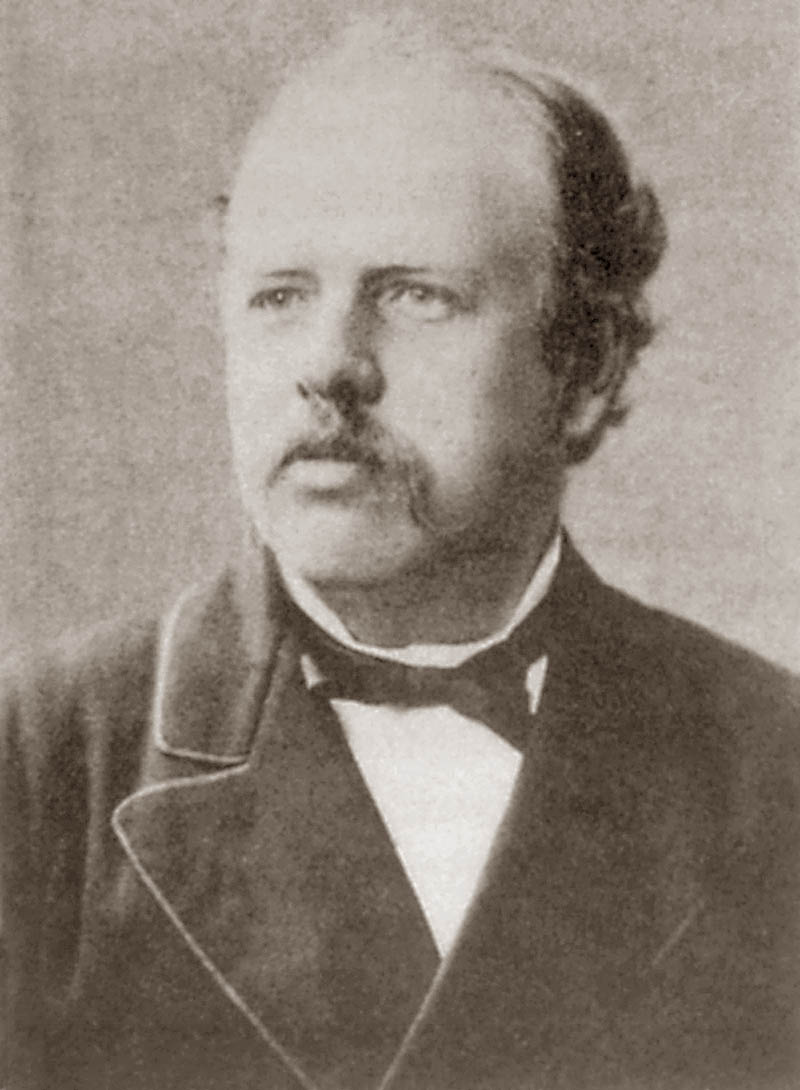

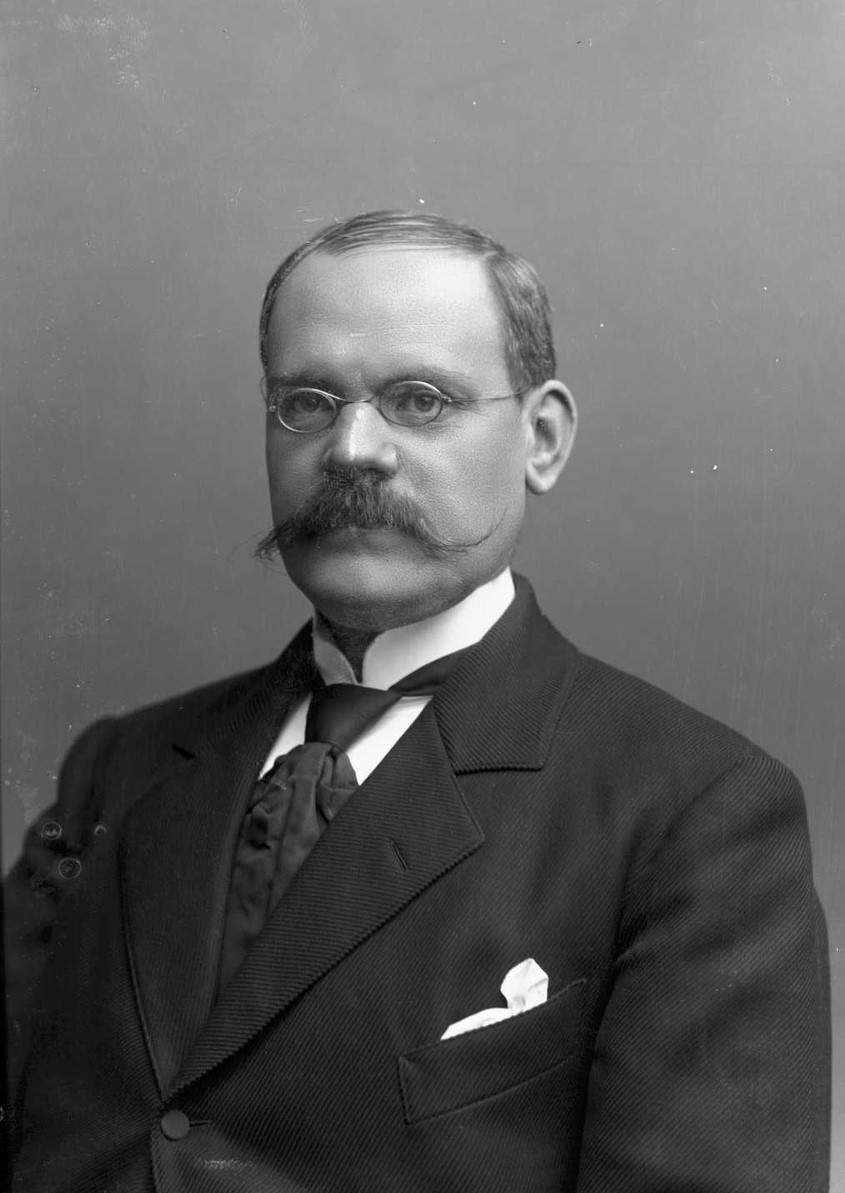

	First party	Second party	Third party
Leader	Lars Holst	Francis Hagerup
Party	Liberal	Conservative	Moderate Liberal
Last election	52.68%, 79 seats	46.75%, 25 seats	10 seats with H
Seats won	77	31	6
Seat change	▼2	▲6	▼4
Popular vote	127,142	96,092 (H+MV)	Alliance with H
Percentage	54.01%	40.82% (H+MV)	—
Prime Minister before election
Johannes Steen
Liberal
Prime Minister after election
Johannes Steen
Liberal

Parliamentary elections were held in Norway in 1900. The result was a victory for the Liberal Party, which received 54% of the vote and won 79 of the 114 seats in the Storting. No party has received a majority of the vote in a Norwegian election since.

== Results ==
Party	Votes	%	Seats	+/–
Liberal Party	127,142	54.01	77	–2
Conservative Party	96,092	40.82	31	+6
Moderate Liberal Party	96,092	40.82	6	–4
Labour Party	7,013	2.98	0	0
Other parties	5,163	2.19	0	–
Total	235,410	100.00	114	0
Valid votes	235,410	98.66		
Invalid/blank votes	3,207	1.34		
Total votes	238,617	100.00		
Registered voters/turnout	416,593	57.28		
Source: Nohlen & Stöver
