= Conservative Party (Norway) =

Norwegian political party

Conservative Party Høyre Høgre
- Abbreviation: H
- Leader: Ine Eriksen Søreide
- Parliamentary leader: Ine Eriksen Søreide
- Founders: Severin Løvenskiold; Albert Bøhn; Christian August Anker; Otto Rode; Christian Selmer; Eduard Bøckmann and 40 others
- Founded: 25 August 1884
- Headquarters: Stortingsgaten 20 0161, Oslo
- Youth wing: Norwegian Young Conservatives
- Membership (2024): ▼29,181
- Ideology: Liberal conservatism Pro-Europeanism
- Political position: Centre-right
- European affiliation: European People's Party (associate)
- International affiliation: International Democracy Union
- Nordic affiliation: Conservative Group
- Colours: Blue
- Slogan: Ingen Slagord bare løsningene som virker ('No slogans, just solutions that work')
- Storting: 24 / 169
- County councils: 167 / 777
- Municipal councils: 1,717 / 10,620
- Sámi Parliament: 1 / 39

Website
- høyre.no

The Conservative Party or The Right (Bokmål: Høyre, Nynorsk: Høgre, lit. 'Right', H; Northern Sami: Olgešbellodat) is a liberal-conservative political party in Norway. It is the major party of the Norwegian centre-right, and was the leading party in government as part of the Solberg cabinet from 2013 to 2021. The current party leader is former foreign minister Ine Eriksen Søreide. The party is a member of the International Democracy Union and an associate member of the European People's Party.

The party is traditionally a pragmatic and politically moderate conservative party strongly associated with the traditional elites within the civil service and Norwegian business life. During the 20th century, the party advocated economic liberalism, tax cuts, individual rights, support of monarchism, the Church of Norway and the Armed Forces, anti-communism, pro-Europeanism, and support of the Nordic model: over time, the party's values have become more socially liberal in areas such as gender equality, LGBTIQ+ rights, and immigration and integration issues; the party defines itself as a party pursuing a "conservative progressive policy based on Christian cultural values, constitutional government and democracy". In line with its Western bloc alignment during the Cold War era, the party strongly supports NATO, which Norway co-founded, and has consistently been the most outspokenly pro-European Union party in Norway, supporting Norwegian membership during both the 1972 and 1994 referendums.

The Conservative Party traditionally caters to the educated elite and is the most popular party among elite groups. In the postwar era, the party formed a grand consensus with the Labour Party regarding foreign and security policy—frequently expressed by the maxim "the foreign policy is settled" (utenrikspolitikken ligger fast)—that led Norway to co-found NATO and enter into a close alliance with the United States, and the parties' economic policies have gradually become more similar. Both parties are pragmatic, relatively technocratic, anti-populist, and close to the political centre. The party supports the Nordic model, but also a certain amount of semi-privatisation through state-funded private services.

Founded in 1884, the Conservative Party is the second-oldest political party in Norway after the Liberal Party. In the interwar era, one of the main goals for the party was to achieve a centre-right alliance against the growing labour movement, when the party went into decline. In the post-war era until 2005, the party participated in six governments: two 1960s national governments (Lyng's Cabinet and Borten's Cabinet); one 1980s Conservative Party minority government (Willoch's First Cabinet); two 1980s three-party governments (Willoch's Second Cabinet and Syse's Cabinet); in the 2000s Bondevik's Second Cabinet; and from 2013 to 2021 it was the dominant partner in a coalition government that also included the Christian Democrats and the Liberal Party.

== History ==
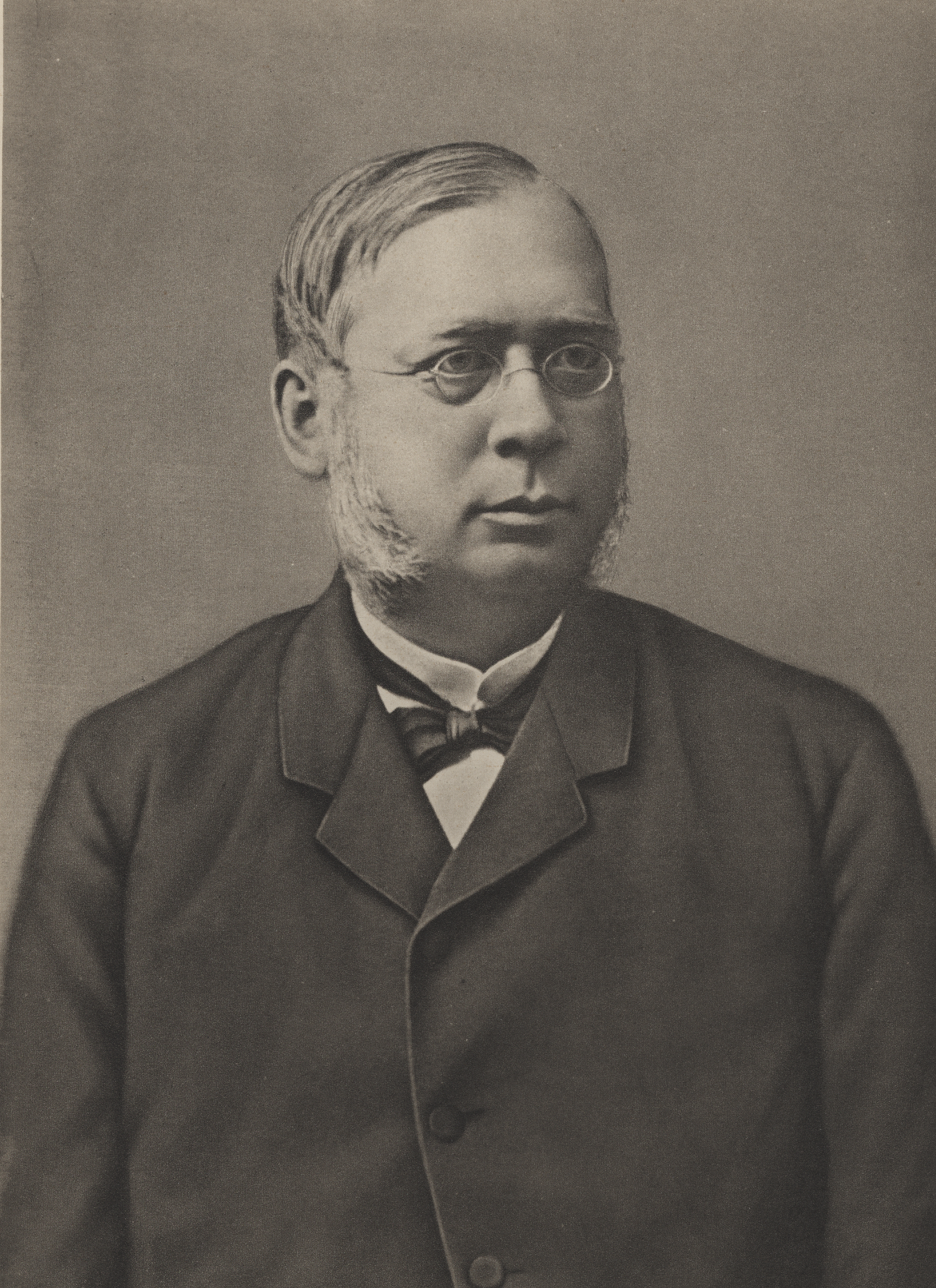
Emil Stang was the first leader of The Conservative Party.

The Conservative Party of Norway (Høire, now spelled Høyre, lit. "The Right") was founded in 1884 after the implementation of parliamentarism in Norway. The jurist Emil Stang was elected the first chairman of the party. Stang underlined important principles for the work in Høyre. The party was to be a social party of reforms that worked within the constitutional frames set by a parliamentary democracy.

Høyre's electoral support has varied. In the 1981 election it obtained 31.7%, its best result since 1924. The result in 1993 was 17%, which saw the election influenced by the EU membership issue which divided the Liberal Party. The 1997 parliamentary election resulted in the lowest support for Høyre since 1945, with only 14.3% of the votes. Since then it has seen support ranging from just over 14% to just under 27%.

=== Early 1900s ===
In the beginning of the 20th century, Høyre took the initiative to construct a modern Norwegian communications network. After the devastating First World War the party felt it important to work for the reconstruction of sound economic policies. An example of this is the resolution Høyre passed in 1923 introducing old-age insurance; owing to the condition of the state's finances it was not possible to continue this effort. It was the leading party in opposition during the post-war years in Norway, and fought against the Labour Party's regulating policy. Høyre wanted another future for Norway, consisting of private initiative and creative forces.

Høyre has been active in the construction of the welfare system in Norway, and has on several occasions taken the initiative to correct injustices in social care regulations. Additionally, Høyre has advocated that the state's activity must concentrate on its basic problems and their solutions.

=== Post-war years ===
During Norway's post-war years Høyre has consolidated its position as a party with appeal to all parts of the nation. Non-socialist co-operation as an alternative to socialism has always been one of Høyre's main aims. Høyre has led several coalition governments.The Christian Democratic Party was one of Høyre's coalition partners both in 1983-86 and 1989-90.

The party strongly supported the Western alignment of Norway during the Cold War; it strongly supports NATO, which Norway co-founded in 1949, and has consistently been the most outspokenly pro-European Union party in Norway, supporting Norwegian membership during both the referendum of 1972 and that of 1994.

At the parliamentary election in 1993, it was impossible to present a credible non-socialist government alternative, because Høyre's former coalition parties, The Christian Democrats and the Centre Party, both campaigned strongly against Norwegian membership of the EU.

Before the parliamentary election in 1997 the Labour Party proclaimed that it would not be willing to govern the country if it did not obtain more than 36.9% of the votes. In the event it obtained 35%, and other parties had to form a government. Originally, there were serious discussions between Høyre, the Christian Democrats and Venstre concerning this task, but in the end the two latter parties joined forces with the Centre Party to create a minority government without Høyre.

=== Today ===
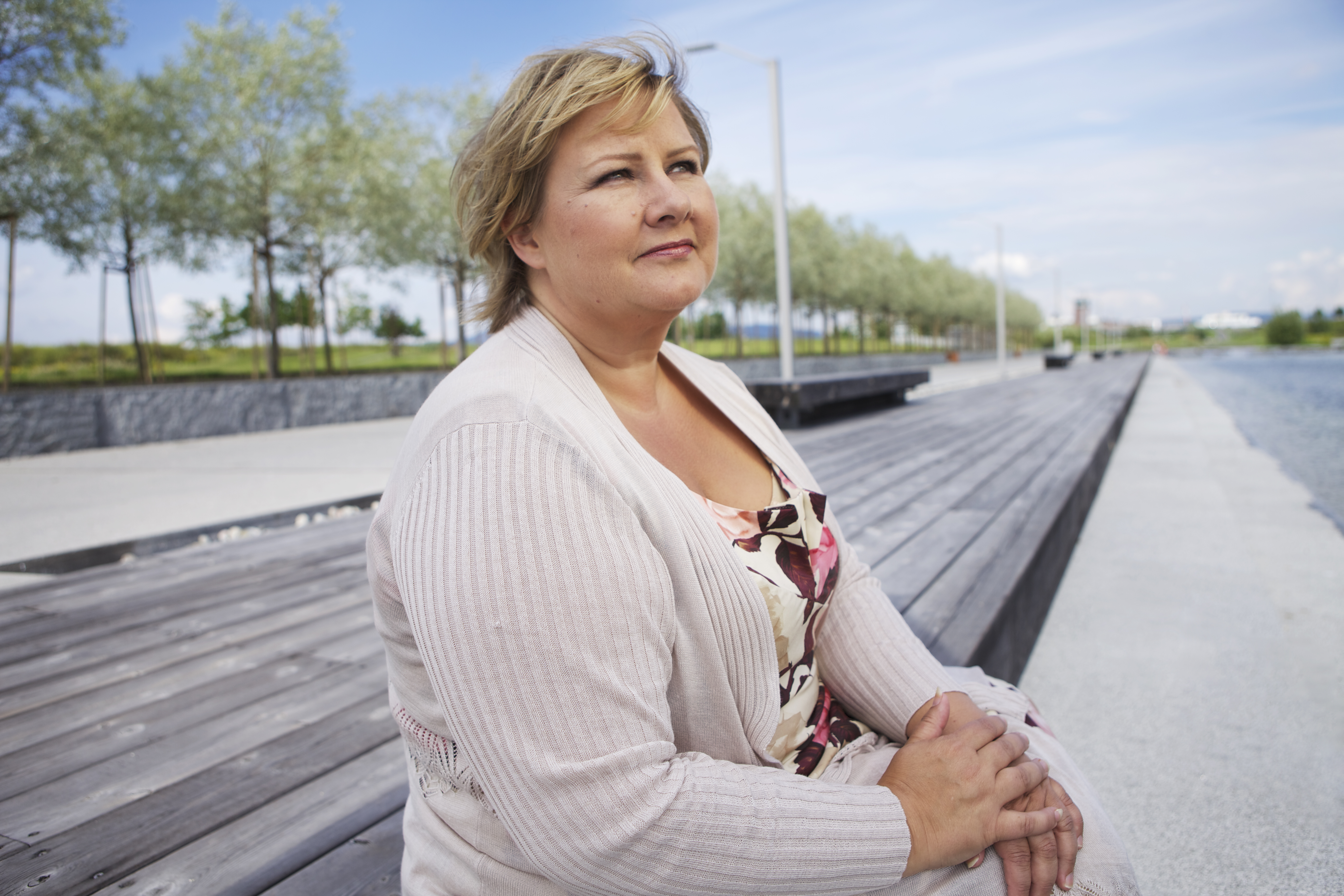
Former Prime Minister Erna Solberg

In the parliamentary election in September 2001, Høyre obtained 21.2 percent of the votes. After a series of discussions Høyre was once again able to take part in a coalition government, this time with the Christian Democratic Party (KrF), and the Liberal Party (V). The total percentage obtained for these three parties at last general election was 37.5. Høyre, as the largest party in the coalition government, had 38 members in the present Storting, and 10 of the 19 ministers in the Government were Høyre representatives. Høyre's three focal areas this period were to establish a rise in quality in Norway's educational system, lower taxes and produce a higher service level in state sectors.

In the 2005 parliamentary election, Høyre obtained 14.1% of the votes. The election outcome put Høyre back in opposition, and the party got 23 members in the present Storting.

In the 2009 parliamentary election, Høyre obtained 17.2% of the votes, and 30 members in the present Storting.

During the local elections of 2011, however, the party gained 27.6 percent of the vote, and it has since then, without exceptions, polled first and second.

In the 2013 parliamentary election, Høyre obtained 26.8 percent of the votes, and 48 members in the present Storting. Høyre formed a minority government, with confidence and supply from KrF and V. The Government was reelected in 2017 and became a majority Government in 2019. In the 2021 election, centre-left parties won the majority of seats and Solberg conceded defeat. The party's downward trend continued in the 2025 parliamentary election, where the Labour Party and their allies won with a reduced majority. Despite the left-of-centre bloc losing seats on aggregate, the Conservatives were pushed into third place, losing 12 seats. The party was displaced as the main right-of-centre party by the Progress Party, which won 47 seats to the Conservatives' 24. Solberg later indicated her intention to resign as Conservative leader as a result of the party's poor showing; she remained as party leader until a successor (Ine Eriksen Søreide) was elected at the 2026 party conference.

== Ideology ==
Høyre has been described as a conservative or liberal-conservative party, and it defines itself as a party pursuing a "progressive-conservative policy based on Christian cultural values, constitutional government and democracy."

Høyre is considered a centre-right reformist party professed to the moderately conservative political tradition, similar to the CDU of Germany. The party broadly supports the Nordic model, like all large parties in Norway. In relative terms, the party advocates for free-market policies, including tax cuts and moderate government involvement in the economy, while still supporting a big welfare state and a social market economy. Høyre is one of two parties in the Storting which proposes a reduction in public spending.

Traditionally, the party supports established institutions, such as the monarchy, the armed forces, and the Church of Norway. Its social policies were always considered moderate and pragmatic for its time, but have gradually become more socially liberal.

=== LGBTIQ+ rights ===
In the 21st century, the Conservative Party supports LGBTIQ+ rights as a fundamental part of its liberal-conservative ideology, and it has implemented several policies advancing transgender and other LGBTIQ+ rights. The party voted in 2008 for a law that recognised same-sex marriage and gay adoption rights.

Erna Solberg's government proposed several policies advancing transgender rights, including gender self-identification in 2016. Conservative Minister of Equality Linda Hofstad Helleland condemned all forms of transphobia and said that "trans people are subjected to hate, violence, and harassment." After Conservative Party local politician Simen Sandelien published a Facebook post about "transgender ideology", he was strongly criticized by the party. Conservative Party leader Erna Solberg said Sandelien should reconsider if he really agrees with the Conservative Party's basic ideology. Conservative Secretary general Tom Erlend Skaug said he had summoned Sandelien for a conversation, but amid calls for his expulsion Sandelien later that day sent out a statement confirming that he had resigned from the party.

== Membership and voter demographic ==
The party has around 30,000 registered members (2018). The Central Board of the Conservative Party meets seven times a year to discuss important matters such as budget, organisational work, plans, party platforms, and drawing up political lines.

The party traditionally caters to the educated elite; it has the most highly educated voters of all parties, and is the most popular party among elite groups.

== List of party chairmen and leaders ==
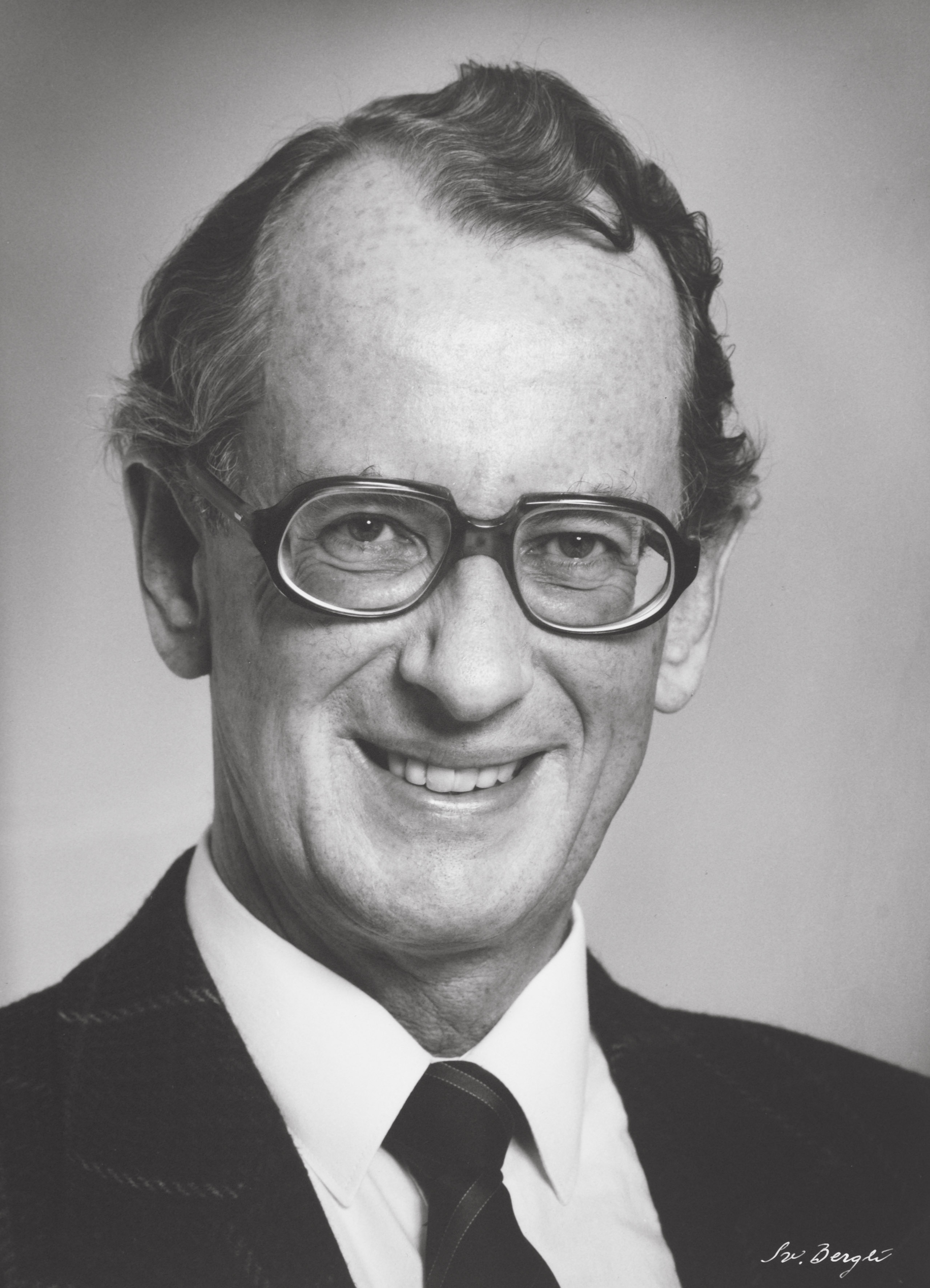
Former Prime Minister and Chairperson Jan P. Syse

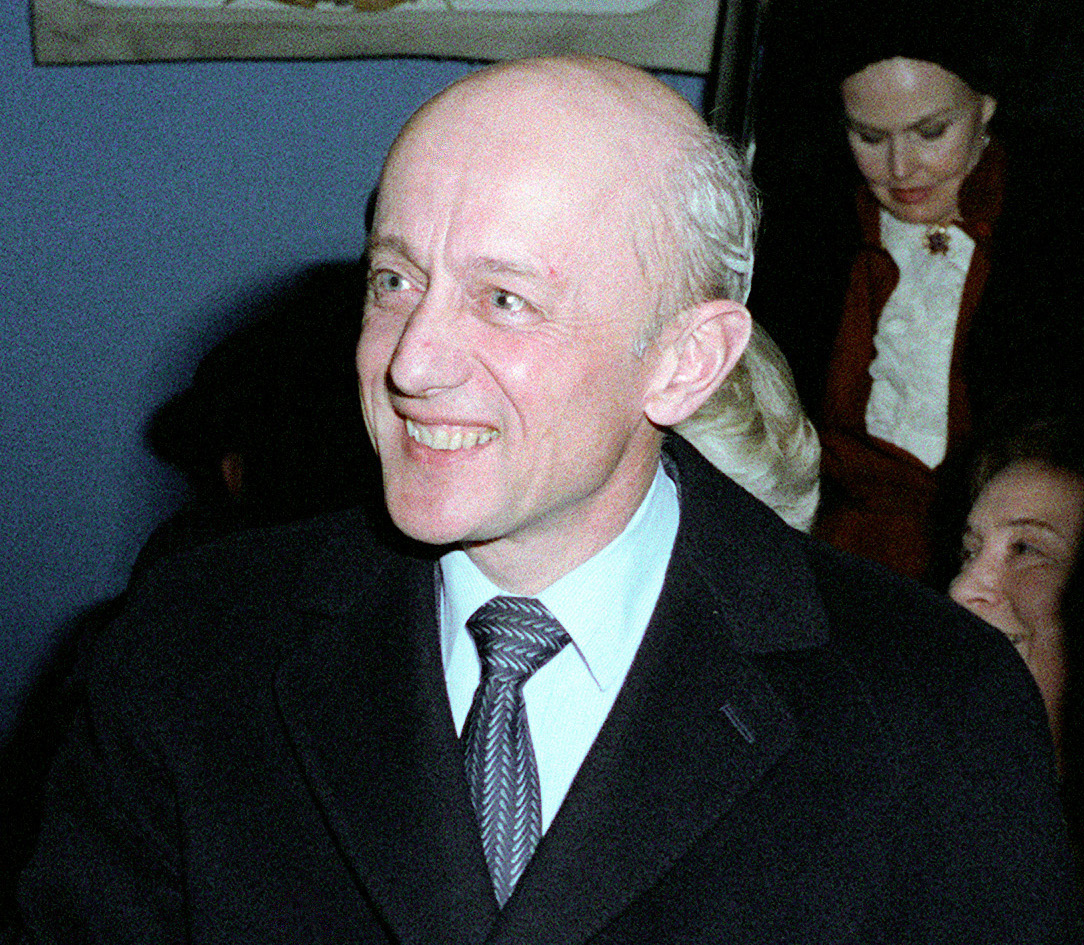
Former Prime Minister and Chairperson Kåre Willoch

- Emil Stang, 1884–1889
- Christian Homann Schweigaard, 1889–1891
- Emil Stang, 1891–1893
- Christian Homann Schweigaard, 1893–1896
- Emil Stang, 1896–1899
- Francis Hagerup, 1899–1902
- Ole Larsen Skattebøl, 1902–1905
- Edm. Harbitz, 1905–1907
- Fredrik Stang, 1907–1911
- Jens Bratlie, 1911–1919
- Otto Bahr Halvorsen, 1919–1923
- Ivar Lykke, 1923–1926
- Carl Joachim Hambro, 1926–1934
- Johan H. Andresen, 1934–1937
- Ole Ludvig Bærøe, 1937–1940
- Arthur Nordlie, 1945–1950
- Carl Joachim Hambro, 1950–1954
- Alv Kjøs, 1954–1962
- Sjur Lindebrække, 1962–1970
- Kåre Willoch, 1970–1974
- Erling Norvik, 1974–1980
- Jo Benkow, 1980–1984
- Erling Norvik, 1984–1986
- Rolf Presthus, 1986–1988
- Kaci Kullmann Five, 1988
- Jan P. Syse, 1988–1991
- Kaci Kullmann Five, 1991–1994
- Jan Petersen, 1994–2004
- Erna Solberg, 2004–2026
- Ine Eriksen Søreide, 2026–present

== Election results ==
=== Storting ===
| Election | Leader | Votes | % | Seats | +/– | Position | Status |
|---|---|---|---|---|---|---|---|
| 1885 | Emil Stang | 33,284 | 36.6 | 30 / 114 | ▼1 | ▲2nd | Opposition |
| 1888 | Emil Stang | 36,564 | 38.7 | 51 / 114 | ▲21 | ▲1st | Opposition (1888–1889) |
| 1888 | Emil Stang | 36,564 | 38.7 | 51 / 114 | ▲21 | ▲1st | Minority (1889–1891) |
| 1891 (Note: Contested the election in alliance with the Moderate Liberal Party. Vote share shows the combined votes the alliance received.) | Emil Stang | 50,059 | 49.2 | 35 / 114 | ▼16 | ▼2nd | Opposition |
| 1894 | Christian Schweigaard | 81,462 | 49.3 | 40 / 114 | ▲5 | 2nd | Opposition |
| 1897 | Emil Stang | 77,682 | 46.7 | 25 / 114 | ▼15 | 2nd | Opposition |
| 1900 | Francis Hagerup | 96,092 | 40.8 | 31 / 114 | ▲6 | 2nd | Opposition |
| 1903 | Ole Larsen Skattebøl | 106,042 | 44.8 | 47 / 117 | ▲16 | 2nd | Coalition (1903–1905) |
| 1903 | Ole Larsen Skattebøl | 106,042 | 44.8 | 47 / 117 | ▲16 | 2nd | Coalition (1905–1906) |
| 1906 | Edmund Harbitz | Within the Coalition Party | | 36 / 123 | ▼26 (Note: Compared to the combined seats and vote share of the Conservative Party, the Moderate Liberal Party, and the Coalition Party in the previous parliament.) | 2nd | Opposition |
| 1909 (Note: Includes vote share of the Free-minded Liberal Party (Statistics Norway).) | Fredrik Stang | 175,388 | 41.5 | 41 / 123 | ▲5 | 2nd | Opposition (1909–1910) |
| 1909 | Fredrik Stang | 175,388 | 41.5 | 41 / 123 | ▲5 | 2nd | Coalition (1910–1912) |
| 1912 | Jens Bratlie | 162,074 | 33.2 | 20 / 123 | ▼21 | ▼3rd | Coalition (1912–1913) |
| 1912 | Jens Bratlie | 162,074 | 33.2 | 20 / 123 | ▼21 | ▼3rd | Opposition (1913–1915) |
| 1915 | Jens Bratlie | 179,028 | 29.0 | 20 / 123 | Steady | ▲2nd | Opposition |
| 1918 | Jens Bratlie | 201,325 | 30.4 | 40 / 126 | ▲20 | 2nd | Opposition (1918–1920) |
| 1918 | Jens Bratlie | 201,325 | 30.4 | 40 / 126 | ▲20 | 2nd | Coalition (1920–1921) |
| 1921 | Otto Bahr Halvorsen | 301,372 | 33.3 | 42 / 150 | ▲2 | ▲1st | Opposition (1921–1923) |
| 1921 | Otto Bahr Halvorsen | 301,372 | 33.3 | 42 / 150 | ▲2 | ▲1st | Coalition (1923–1924) |
| 1924 | Ivar Lykke | 316,846 | 32.5 | 43 / 150 | ▲1 | 1st | Opposition (1924–1926) |
| 1924 | Ivar Lykke | 316,846 | 32.5 | 43 / 150 | ▲1 | 1st | Coalition (1926–1927) |
| 1927 | C. J. Hambro | 240,091 | 24.0 | 29 / 150 | ▼14 | ▼3rd | Coalition (1927–1928) |
| 1927 | C. J. Hambro | 240,091 | 24.0 | 29 / 150 | ▼14 | ▼3rd | Opposition (1928–1930) |
| 1930 | C. J. Hambro | 327,731 | 27.4 | 39 / 150 | ▲10 | ▲2nd | Opposition |
| 1933 | C. J. Hambro | 252,506 | 20.2 | 30 / 150 | ▼9 | 2nd | Opposition |
| 1936 | Johan H. Andresen | 310,324 | 21.3 | 36 / 150 | ▲6 | 2nd | Opposition |
| 1945 | Arthur Nordlie | 252,608 | 17.0 | 25 / 150 | ▼11 | 2nd | Opposition |
| 1949 (Note: The Conservative Party ran on joint lists in a limited number of constituencies from 1949 to 1977. Vote numbers are from independent Conservative lists only, while vote percentage also includes the Conservative Party's estimated share from joint lists (Statistics Norway estimates).) | Arthur Nordlie | 279,790 | 18.3 | 23 / 150 | ▼2 | 2nd | Opposition |
| 1953 | C. J. Hambro | 327,971 | 18.6 | 27 / 150 | ▲4 | 2nd | Opposition |
| 1957 | Alv Kjøs | 301,395 | 18.9 | 29 / 150 | ▲2 | 2nd | Opposition |
| 1961 | Alv Kjøs | 354,369 | 20.0 | 29 / 150 | Steady | 2nd | Opposition (1961–1963) |
| 1961 | Alv Kjøs | 354,369 | 20.0 | 29 / 150 | Steady | 2nd | Coalition (1963) |
| 1961 | Alv Kjøs | 354,369 | 20.0 | 29 / 150 | Steady | 2nd | Opposition (1963–1965) |
| 1965 | Sjur Lindebrække | 415,612 | 21.1 | 31 / 150 | ▲2 | 2nd | Coalition |
| 1969 | Sjur Lindebrække | 406,209 | 19.6 | 29 / 150 | ▼2 | 2nd | Coalition (1969–1971) |
| 1969 | Sjur Lindebrække | 406,209 | 19.6 | 29 / 150 | ▼2 | 2nd | Opposition (1971–1973) |
| 1973 | Kåre Willoch | 370,370 | 17.4 | 29 / 155 | Steady | 2nd | Opposition |
| 1977 | Erling Norvik | 563,783 | 24.8 | 41 / 155 | ▲12 | 2nd | Opposition |
| 1981 | Jo Benkow | 780,372 | 31.7 | 53 / 155 | ▲12 | 2nd | Minority (1981–1983) |
| 1981 | Jo Benkow | 780,372 | 31.7 | 53 / 155 | ▲12 | 2nd | Coalition (1983–1985) |
| 1985 | Erling Norvik | 791,537 | 30.4 | 50 / 157 | ▼3 | 2nd | Coalition (1985–1986) |
| 1985 | Erling Norvik | 791,537 | 30.4 | 50 / 157 | ▼3 | 2nd | Opposition (1986–1989) |
| 1989 | Jan P. Syse | 588,682 | 22.2 | 37 / 165 | ▼13 | 2nd | Coalition (1989–1990) |
| 1989 | Jan P. Syse | 588,682 | 22.2 | 37 / 165 | ▼13 | 2nd | Opposition (1990–1993) |
| 1993 | Kaci Kullmann Five | 419,373 | 17.0 | 28 / 165 | ▼9 | ▼3rd | Opposition |
| 1997 | Jan Petersen | 370,441 | 14.3 | 23 / 165 | ▼5 | ▼4th | Opposition |
| 2001 | Jan Petersen | 534,852 | 21.2 | 38 / 165 | ▲15 | ▲2nd | Coalition |
| 2005 | Erna Solberg | 372,008 | 14.1 | 23 / 169 | ▼15 | ▼3rd | Opposition |
| 2009 | Erna Solberg | 462,465 | 17.2 | 30 / 169 | ▲7 | 3rd | Opposition |
| 2013 | Erna Solberg | 760,232 | 26.8 | 48 / 169 | ▲18 | ▲2nd | Coalition |
| 2017 | Erna Solberg | 732,897 | 25.0 | 45 / 169 | ▼3 | 2nd | Coalition |
| 2021 | Erna Solberg | 607,316 | 20.5 | 36 / 169 | ▼9 | 2nd | Opposition |
| 2025 | Erna Solberg | 471,602 | 14.7 | 24 / 169 | ▼12 | ▼3rd | Opposition |

== See also ==
- Politics of Norway
