= Christian Johansen Ihlen =

Norwegian politician

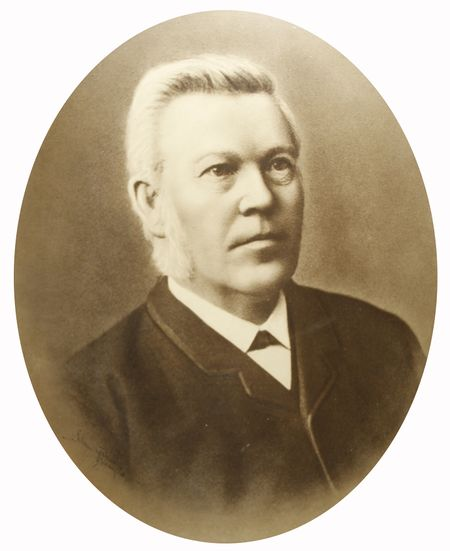
Christian J Ihlen ( MG 6710 - EA 08)

Christian Johansen Ihlen (26 November 1838–14 January 1901) was a Norwegian politician for the Moderate Liberal Party.

Ihlen was a farmer who owned and operated the Ulleren farm in Øvre Eiker. He was elected to the Norwegian Parliament in 1889, representing the rural constituency of Buskerud Amt. He served only one three-year term.
