= 1897 Norwegian parliamentary election =

- 1897

All 114 seats in the Storting 57 seats needed for a majority
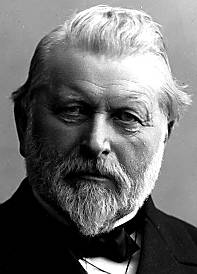

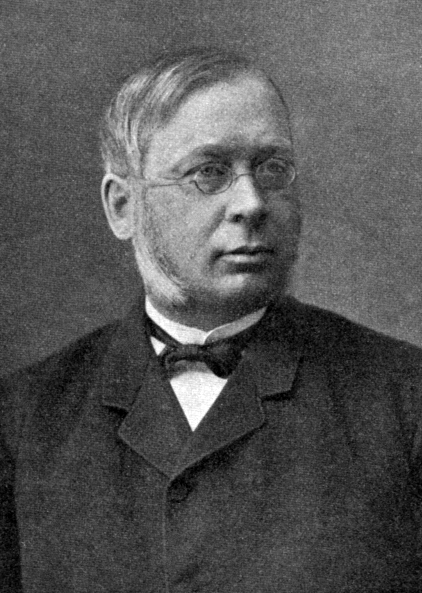

	First party	Second party	Third party
Leader	Johannes Steen	Emil Stang
Party	Liberal	Conservative	Moderate Liberal
Last election	50.36%, 59 seats	49.33%, 40 seats	15 seats with H
Seats won	79	25	10
Seat change	▲20	▼15	▼5
Popular vote	87,548	77,682 (H+MV)	Alliance with H
Percentage	52.68%	47.65% (H+MV)	—
Prime Minister before election
Francis Hagerup
Conservative
Prime Minister after election
Francis Hagerup
Conservative

Parliamentary elections were held in Norway in 1897. The result was a victory for the Liberal Party, which won 79 of the 114 seats in the Storting.

== Results ==
Party	Votes	%	Seats	+/–
Liberal Party	87,548	52.68	79	+20
Conservative Party	77,682	46.75	25	–15
Moderate Liberal Party	77,682	46.75	10	–5
Labour Party	947	0.57	0	0
Total	166,177	100.00	114	0
Valid votes	166,177	99.38		
Invalid/blank votes	1,030	0.62		
Total votes	167,207	100.00		
Registered voters/turnout	195,956	85.33		
Source: Nohlen & Stöver
