= Gotskalk Mathiassen Seim =

Norwegian politician

Gotskalk Mathiassen Seim (19 September 1818 – 4 May 1873) was a Norwegian farmer and politician.

He was born in Voss as a son of bailiff Mathias Gotskalksen Ringheim. He bought the farm Oppeland in 1843, which he later sold and bought another farm Dugstad. In addition to being a farmer, he was responsible for the mail route to Lærdal between 1839 and 1873.

Seim was a member of the municipal council of Voss Municipality from 1845 to 1873 and served as deputy mayor from 1878 to 1889. He was deputy representative during the term 1859–1860 and was later elected to the Parliament of Norway from Søndre Bergenhus amt in 1862, 1865 and 1868.

He married Ingeborg Olsdatter Fladekval. Their son Mathias took over the farm Dugstad, served as both mayor and MP.
