= Ole Vollan =

Norwegian educator, editor and politician

Ole Christiansen Vollan (27 July 1837 – 19 April 1907) was a Norwegian educator, editor, and politician for the Moderate Liberal Party.

He was born in Austad. He finished his secondary education in 1856, and graduated with the cand.theol. degree in 1861. He started his professional life as a teacher in Bergen, Hammerfest and Ringerike. In 1867 he was hired as a sexton in Bergen, and served as acting school director between 1868 and 1871. In 1877 he founded the magazine Ny Luthersk Kirketidende together with Jakob Sverdrup; Vollan sat as co-editor from 1877 to 1881. In 1880 he was hired in the newspaper Vestlandsposten, for which he became editor-in-chief in 1891.

He was a member of Bergen city council from 1883 to 1890 and 1897 to 1901. He served as a deputy representative to the Norwegian Parliament during the term 1904–1906. He represented the Moderate Liberal Party, for whom he was among the leading figures.

Through his daughter Helga Vollan, Ole Vollan was the grandfather of Harald and Nordahl Grieg.
