= 1894 Norwegian parliamentary election =

- 1894

All 114 seats in the Storting 57 seats needed for a majority
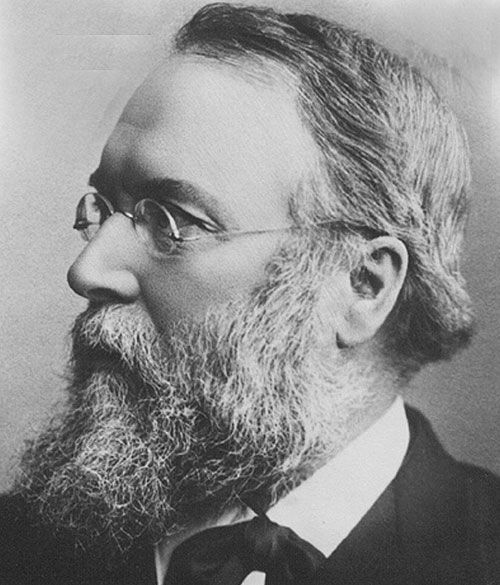

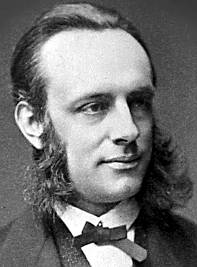

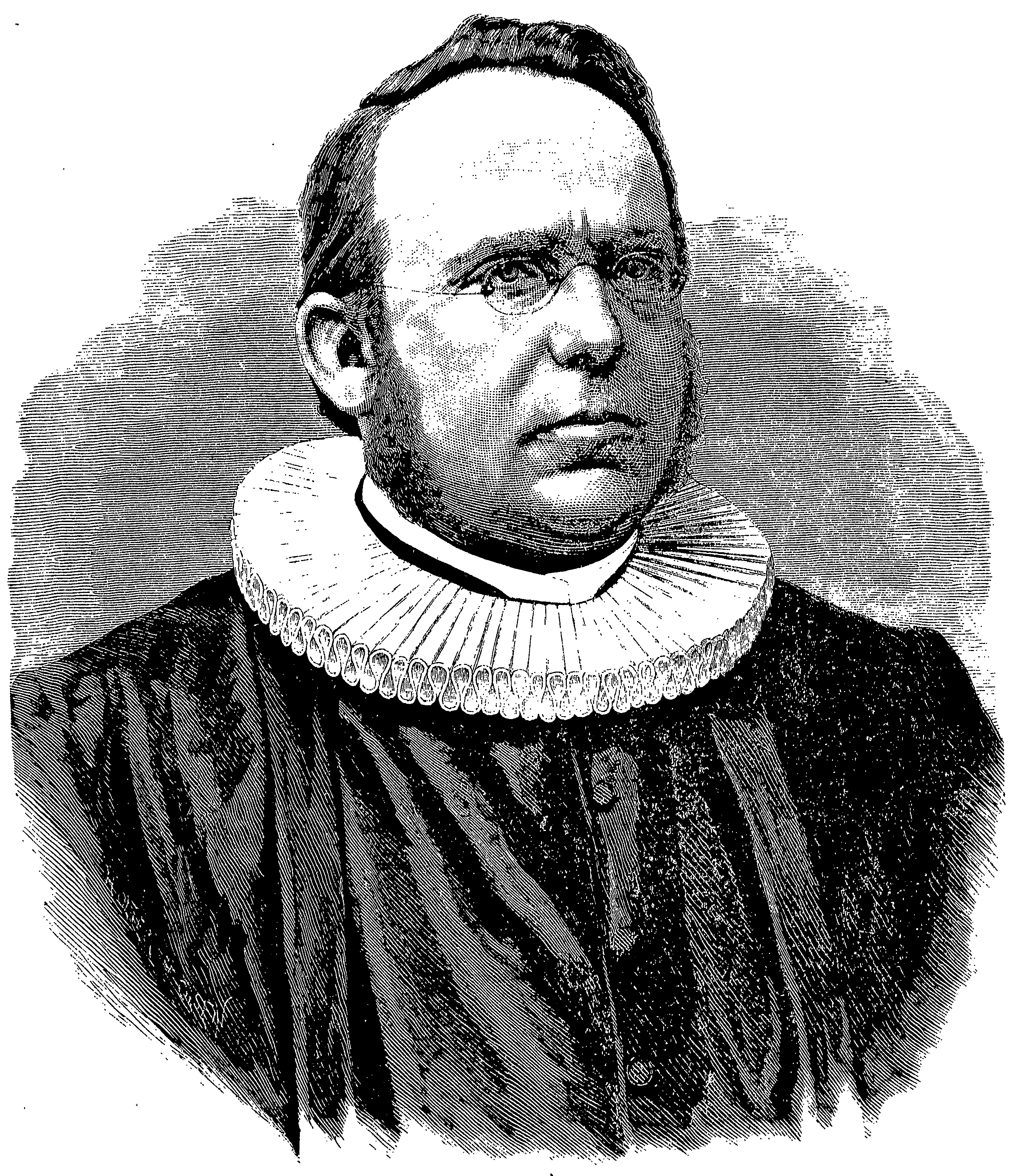
	First party	Second party	Third party
Leader	Ole Anton Qvam	Christian Schweigaard	Lars Oftedal
Party	Liberal	Conservative	Moderate Liberal
Last election	50.84%, 63 seats	49.16%, 35 seats	16 seats with H
Seats won	59	40	15
Seat change	▼4	▲5	▼1
Popular vote	83,165	81,462 (H+MV)	Alliance with H
Percentage	50.36%	49.33% (H+MV)	—
Prime Minister before election
Emil Stang
Conservative
Prime Minister after election
Emil Stang
Conservative

Parliamentary elections were held in Norway in 1894. The result was a victory for the Liberal Party, which won 59 of the 114 seats in the Storting.

== Results ==
Party	Votes	%	Seats	+/–
Liberal Party	83,165	50.36	59	–4
Conservative Party	81,462	49.33	40	+5
Moderate Liberal Party	81,462	49.33	15	–1
Labour Party	520	0.31	0	New
Total	165,147	100.00	114	0
Valid votes	165,147	99.49		
Invalid/blank votes	852	0.51		
Total votes	165,999	100.00		
Registered voters/turnout	184,124	90.16		
Source: Nohlen & Stöver
