= 1885 Norwegian parliamentary election =

- 1885

All 114 seats in the Storting 57 seats needed for a majority
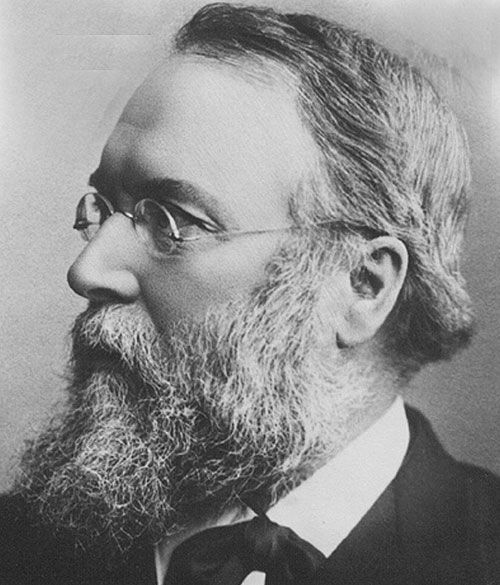

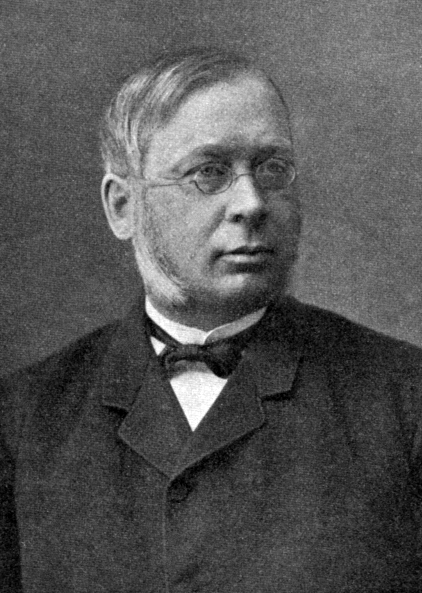
| | First party | Second party |
|---|---|---|
| Leader | Ole Anton Qvam | Emil Stang |
| Party | Liberal | Conservative |
| Last election | 62.83%, 83 seats | 37.17%, 31 seats |
| Seats won | 84 | 30 |
| Seat change | ▲1 | ▼1 |
| Popular vote | 57,683 | 33,284 |
| Percentage | 63.41% | 36.59% |
Prime Minister before election
Johan Sverdrup
Liberal
Prime Minister after election
Johan Sverdrup
Liberal

Parliamentary elections were held in Norway in 1885. The result was a victory for the Liberal Party, which won 84 of the 114 seats in the Storting. Johan Sverdrup remained Prime Minister.

== Leadership changes and challenges ==
=== Liberal party ===
Johan Sverdrup was elected chairman at the founding congress of the Liberal Party on 28 January 1884.

| Candidate | Votes | % |
|---|---|---|
| Johan Sverdrup | 101 | 17.00 |
| Jacob Lindboe | 94 | 15.82 |
| A. D. S. Hjorth | 79 | 13.30 |
| Ole Anton Qvam | 68 | 11.45 |
| Viggo Ullmann | 55 | 9.26 |
| Kaptein G Krogh | 54 | 9.09 |
| Brugseier H. wæringsaasen | 51 | 8.59 |
| Do. W Konow | 51 | 8.59 |
| Gaardseier W. Konow | 41 | 6.90 |
| Total | 594 | 100.00 |
Source: Mjeldheim

== Results ==
| Party | Votes | % | Seats | +/– |
|---|---|---|---|---|
| Liberal Party | 57,683 | 63.41 | 84 | +1 |
| Conservative Party | 33,284 | 36.59 | 30 | –1 |
| Total | 90,967 | 100.00 | 114 | 0 |
| Valid votes | 90,967 | 98.55 | | |
| Invalid/blank votes | 1,341 | 1.45 | | |
| Total votes | 92,308 | 100.00 | | |
| Registered voters/turnout | 122,952 | 75.08 | | |
Source: Nohlen & Stöver
