= Bible Belt (Norway) =

Religiously observant area of Norway

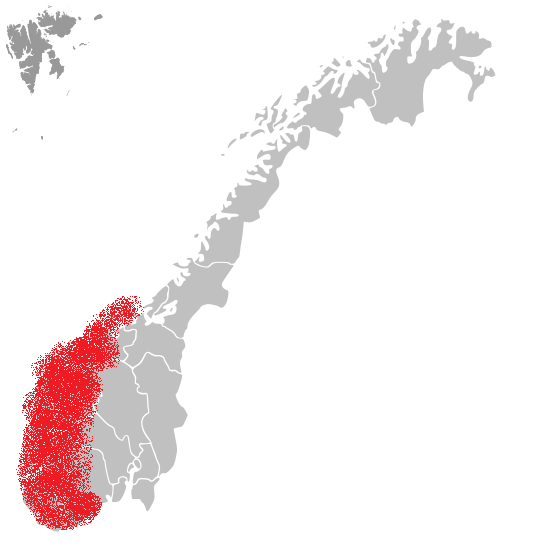
Rough indication of the Norwegian Bible Belt

Support for the Christian Democratic Party at the 2017 parliamentary election

The Norwegian Bible Belt (Norwegian: bibelbeltet) is a loosely defined southwestern coastal area of Norway, which is more religiously observant than most of the rest of the country. Typically, the definition covers Western Norway (Vestlandet) and Southern Norway (Sørlandet), which includes the counties of Rogaland (typically called the "buckle" of the Bible Belt), Hordaland, Sogn og Fjordane, Møre og Romsdal and Agder. However, the most urban areas, such as Stavanger (once known as the 'religious capital of Norway'), have become strongly secularised since the 1960s and are no longer considered part of the Bible Belt.

== Characteristics ==
Socioeconomic gender equality in the Bible Belt is the lowest in all of Norway; the major cities of Bergen, Stavanger and Kristiansand, however, are amongst the most progressive municipalities in the country. In the 1926 referendum on the repeal of prohibition on alcohol, the Bible Belt cast a strong vote against repeal (73.1% in Rogaland, 77.2% in Møre og Romsdal), unlike the rest of Norway. The Bible Belt also has a strong pietist movement, that opposes the central authority of the State Church of Norway. Rogaland is home to many missionary associations and the strongest base of the two main Christian democratic parties, the Moderate Liberal Party (which dissolved in 1905) and the Christian People's Party. In the 2021 Norwegian parliamentary election, the Christian People's Party only won three parliamentary seats nationwide: one each from the electoral districts of Hordaland, Rogaland and Vest-Agder, all of whom are located inside the Bible Belt. In Sørlandet, Sunday church attendance is observed by 2 in 10 people, compared to slightly less than 1 in 10 in Norway on average.

Agder and Rogaland have the highest percentage of married farmers, and the lowest percentage of cohabitants. Rogaland and Sogn og Fjordane have the lowest proportion of divorces and separations, and the latter county also has the highest rate of unmarried farmers. According to research institute Forskning.no this relationship pattern is typical of the Bible Belt.

== Little Bible Belt ==
There is also a "Little Bible Belt" (lille bibelbeltet) in the southeast near the Swedish border, covering Rømskog, Marker and Aremark.
