= 1891 Norwegian parliamentary election =

- 1891

All 114 seats in the Storting 57 seats needed for a majority
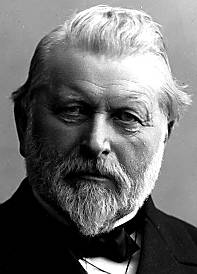

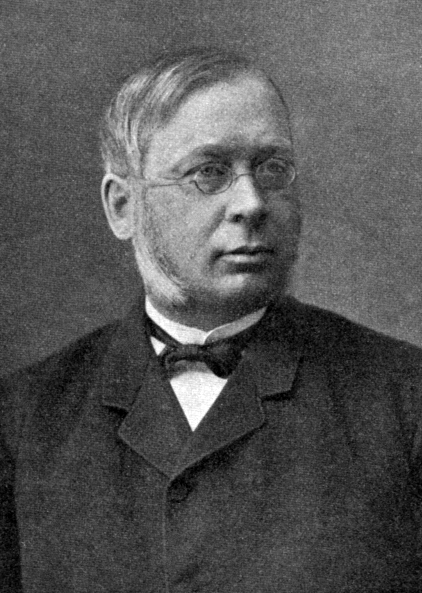

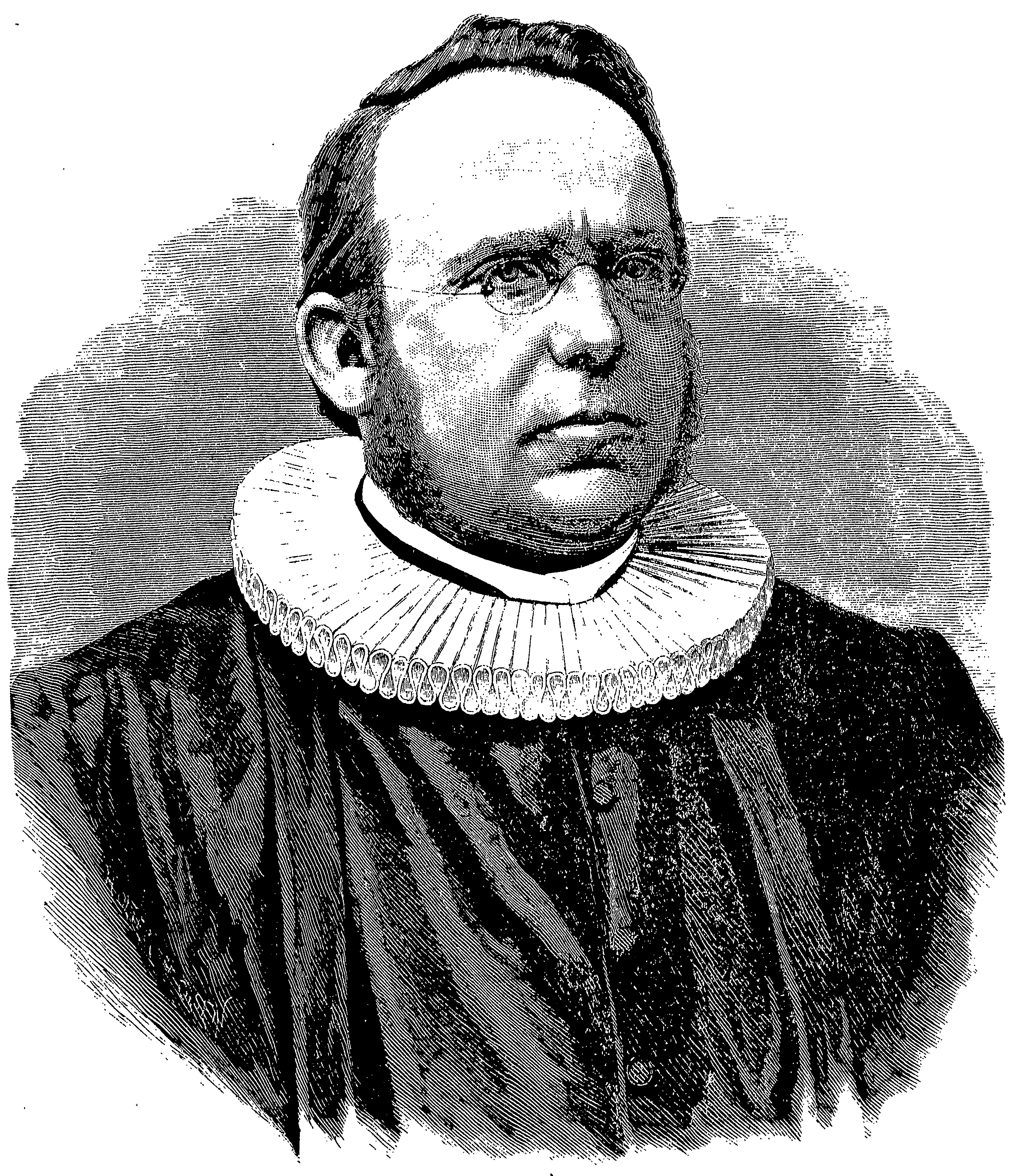
	First party	Second party	Third party
Leader	Johannes Steen	Emil Stang	Lars Oftedal
Party	Liberal	Conservative	Moderate Liberal
Last election	41.78%, 38 seats	38.69%, 51 seats	19.53%, 25 seats
Seats won	63	35	16
Seat change	▲25	▼16	▼9
Popular vote	51,780	50,059 (H+MV)	Alliance with H
Percentage	50.84%	49.16% (H+MV)	—
Prime Minister before election
Emil Stang
Conservative
Prime Minister after election
Johannes Steen
Liberal

Parliamentary elections were held in Norway in 1891. The result was a victory for the Liberal Party, which won 63 of the 114 seats in the Storting. The Conservative Party and the Moderate Liberal Party contested the elections in an alliance, although separate lists were used in some constituencies.

== Results ==
Party	Votes	%	Seats	+/–
Liberal Party	51,780	50.84	63	+25
Conservative Party	50,059	49.16	35	–16
Moderate Liberal Party	50,059	49.16	16	–9
Total	101,839	100.00	114	0
Valid votes	101,839	98.94		
Invalid/blank votes	1,092	1.06		
Total votes	102,931	100.00		
Registered voters/turnout	128,368	80.18		
Source: Nohlen & Stöver
