= 1888 Norwegian parliamentary election =

- 1888

All 114 seats in the Storting 57 seats needed for a majority
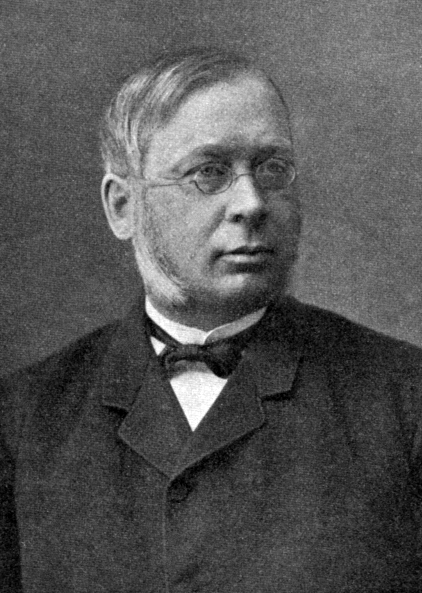

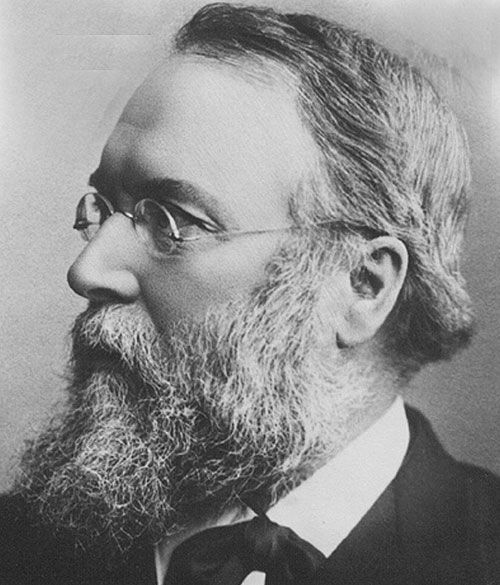

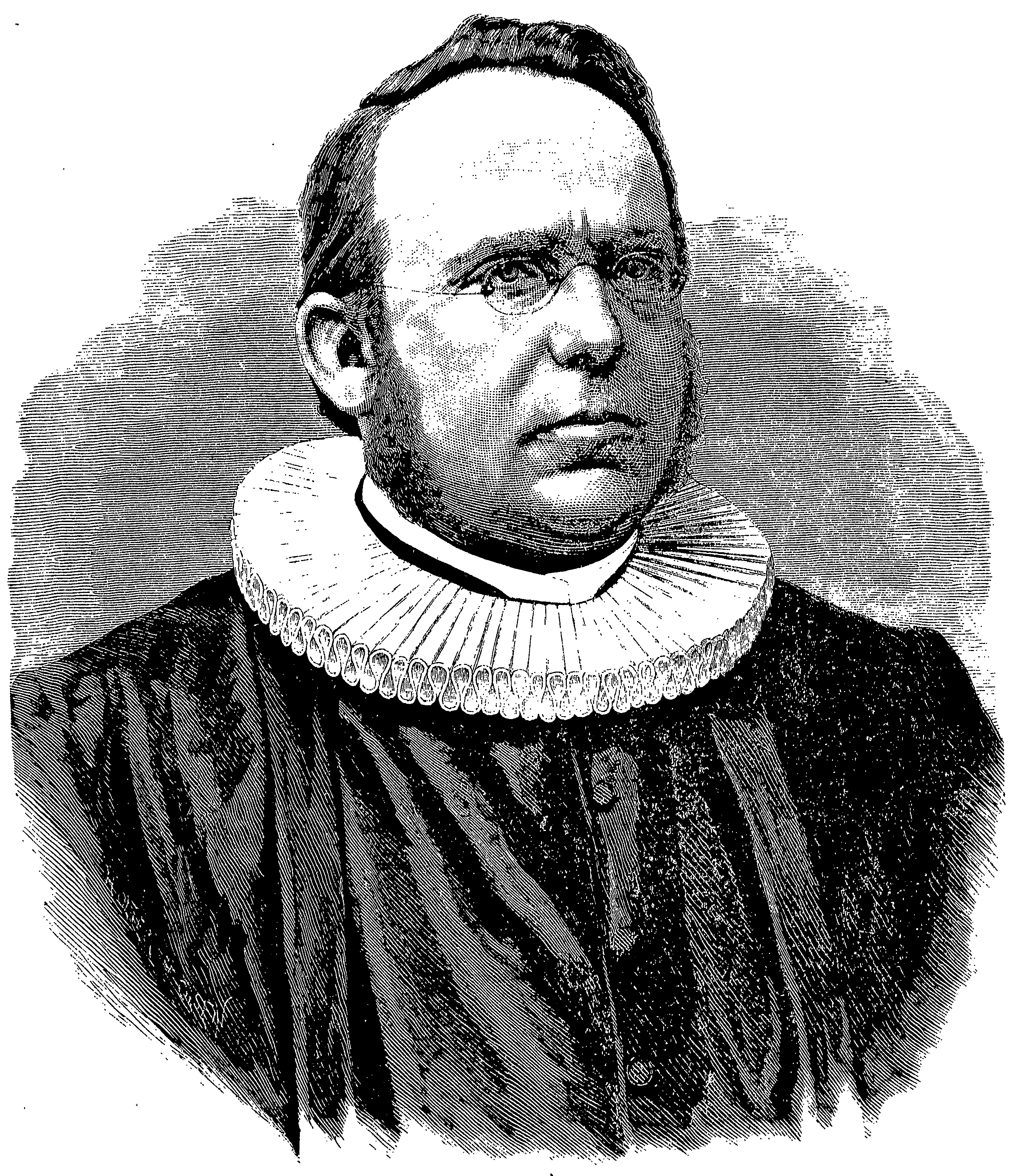
| | First party | Second party | Third party |
|---|---|---|---|
| Leader | Emil Stang | Ole Anton Qvam | Lars Oftedal |
| Party | Conservative | Liberal | Moderate Liberal |
| Last election | 63.41%, 30 seats | 36.59%, 84 seats | – |
| Seats won | 51 | 38 | 25 |
| Seat change | ▲21 | ▼46 | New |
| Popular vote | 34,564 | 37,320 | 17,445 |
| Percentage | 38.69% | 41.78% | 19.53% |
Prime Minister before election
Johan Sverdrup
Liberal
Prime Minister after election
Emil Stang
Conservative

Parliamentary elections were held in Norway in 1888. Although the Liberal Party received the most votes, the result was a victory for the Conservative Party, which won 51 of the 114 seats in the Storting. The Conservatives formed a government led by Emil Stang.

== Results ==
| Party | Votes | % | Seats | +/– |
|---|---|---|---|---|
| Liberal Party | 37,320 | 41.78 | 38 | –46 |
| Conservative Party | 34,564 | 38.69 | 51 | +21 |
| Moderate Liberal Party | 17,445 | 19.53 | 25 | New |
| Total | 89,329 | 100.00 | 114 | 0 |
| Valid votes | 89,329 | 98.80 | | |
| Invalid/blank votes | 1,087 | 1.20 | | |
| Total votes | 90,416 | 100.00 | | |
| Registered voters/turnout | 128,368 | 70.43 | | |
Source: Nohlen & Stöver
