= Liberal Party (Norway) =

Norwegian political party

Liberal Party Venstre (Norwegian) Gurutbellodat (Northern Sami)
- Abbreviation: V
- Chairperson: Guri Melby
- Founders: Johan Sverdrup; Søren Jaabæk; ...and around 109 others
- Founded: 28 January 1884; 142 years ago
- Headquarters: Møllergata 16, 0179 Oslo
- Student wing: Liberal Students of Norway
- Youth wing: Young Liberals of Norway
- Membership (2024): 7,832
- Ideology: Liberalism (Norwegian); Social liberalism Green liberalism Republicanism; Historical: Classical radicalism
- Political position: Centre to centre-right
- European affiliation: Alliance of Liberals and Democrats for Europe
- International affiliation: Liberal International; Historical: Radical International
- Nordic affiliation: Centre Group
- Colours: Teal
- Storting: 3 / 169
- County Councils: 39 / 728
- County Mayors: 0 / 15
- Municipal Councils: 280 / 10,781
- Municipal Mayors: 1 / 357
- Sami Parliament: 0 / 39

Website
- venstre.no

The Liberal Party (Norwegian: Venstre, lit. 'Left', V; Northern Sami: Gurutbellodat) is a social liberal political party in Norway. It was founded in 1884 and is the oldest political party in Norway. The Liberal Party is positioned on the centre to centre-right of the political spectrum. It is a liberal party which has over time enacted reforms such as parliamentarism, freedom of religion, universal suffrage, and state schooling.

For most of the late 19th and early 20th century, it was Norway's largest and most dominant political party. Later, in the postwar era it lost most of its support and became a smaller party. The party has nevertheless participated in several centrist and centre-right government coalitions in the postwar era and it is aligned with the country's centre-right bloc alongside the Conservative Party, Christian Democratic Party and the Progress Party. Guri Melby has served as the party leader since 2020.

The party was founded in 1884. With support mainly from farmers and progressive members of the bourgeoisie, it was the first political party that came into existence in Norway, and was the dominant governmental party for several decades. It has always had a close relationship with the Norwegian Association for Women's Rights, which was founded in the same year by prominent Liberal Party politicians. The party has played a central role in advocating for women's suffrage in Norway. Since the 1880s the party has seen many internal schisms. A politically moderate and religious wing broke away in 1888 to form the Moderate Liberal Party and the conservative-liberal faction, including the former Prime Minister of Norway Christian Michelsen who broke away in 1909 to form the Free-minded Liberal Party (both parties eventually merged into the Conservative Party). The most notable recent schism was in 1972 when the Liberal Party decided to oppose Norwegian membership in the European Economic Community (EEC). The faction supporting membership broke away and formed the Liberal People's Party. The party has since endorsed Norwegian membership in the EU and is currently a strong proponent.

== History ==
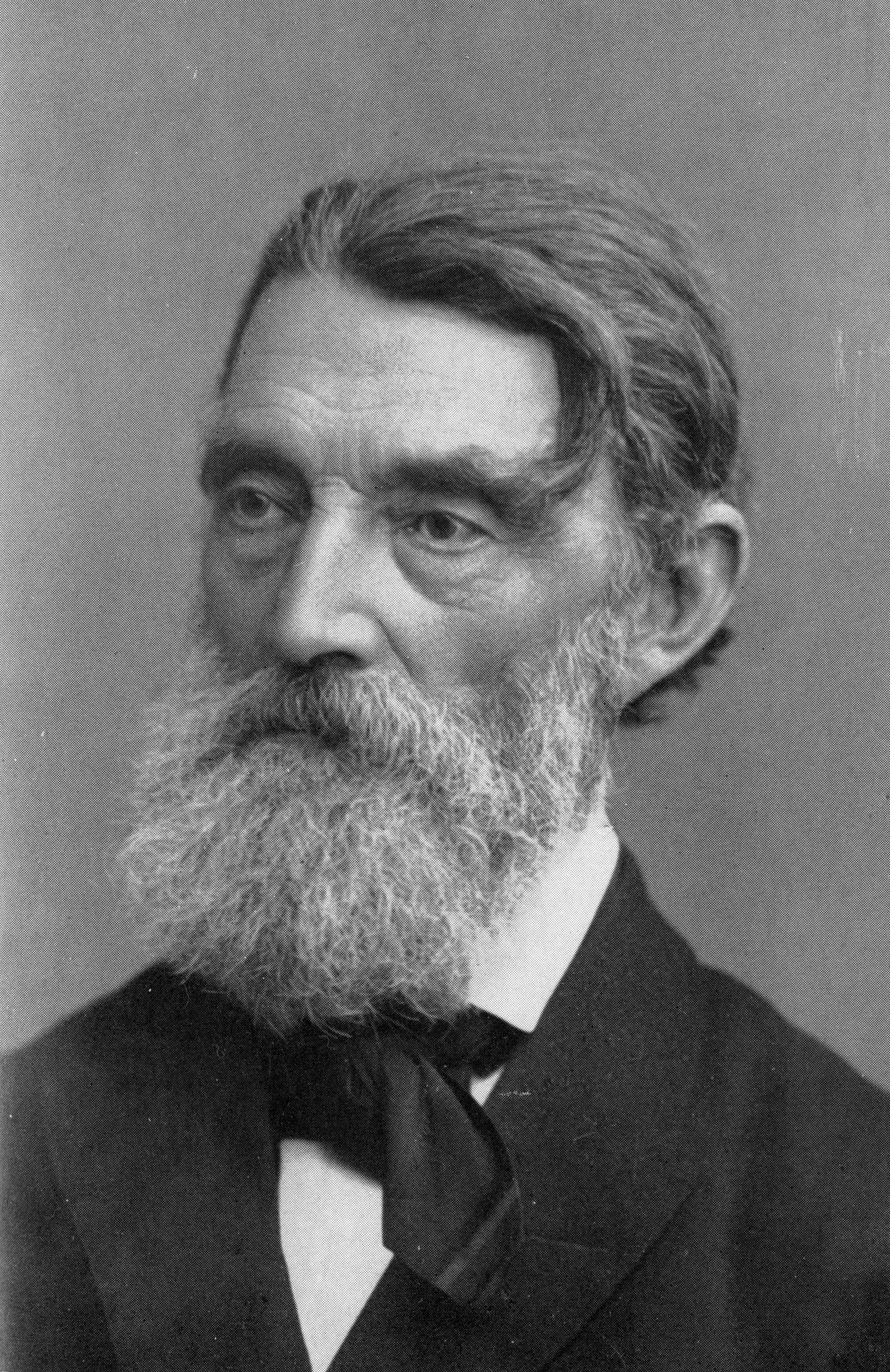
Johan Sverdrup

The party Venstre was formed in 1884 in connection with the dispute about whether or not to introduce parliamentarianism in Norway. Venstre (meaning "Left" in Norwegian) advocated parliamentarianism, whereas the conservatives, who opposed parliamentarianism, formed the party Høyre (meaning "Right" in Norwegian). When the fight for parliamentarianism was won, Venstre's leader Johan Sverdrup became the first Norwegian prime minister to be appointed on the basis of having the support of a majority in the Storting (Norwegian parliament). Later, Venstre advocated universal suffrage for men, which was achieved in 1898, the break-up of the Swedish-Norwegian Union, which happened in 1905, and universal women's suffrage, which was introduced in 1913. In the decades following 1884, Venstre formed several governments, interspersed with periods of Høyre-governments. Six different Prime Ministers of Norway have come from Venstre, all of them before 1935.

In 1891, the more liberal-social tendencies of the party started to dominate Venstre, and as noted by one study, "the majority of social policies up to 1914 were supported and pushed through by Venstre, as the Social Democratic Party had no influence on policy until that date." During the late Nineteenth and early Twentieth Centuries, a number of reforms were carried out by governments formed by Venstre in areas such as working conditions and social welfare.

With the growth of the Labour Party, Venstre gradually lost ground. The election of 1915 was the last in which Venstre was the largest party and won an outright majority in the Storting. Venstre was further weakened with the formation of Bondepartiet (the present-day Centre Party) in 1920, and Christian People's Party in 1933, both of which were formed partly by former Venstre members. Since World War II, Venstre has been part of five coalition governments, the most recent one being Solberg's Cabinet in 2018.

A dispute over Norwegian membership in the European Communities (now the European Union) led to the party splitting at a meeting in Røros in 1972, with the people favoring EC membership departing and forming the Liberal People's Party. These included the party leader, Helge Seip, and 9 of the 13 members of parliament. Since then, Venstre has been a fairly small party. The parliamentary group was reduced to two after the 1973 election.

In 1974, Venstre elected the first female leader of a political party in Norway, Eva Kolstad.

Election results continued to be poor for Venstre. Before the 1985 election the party announced for the first, and so far only, time that it would support a Labour Party government. At the following election Venstre lost its two remaining seats, and was without representation in the Storting for the first time. The party merged in 1988 with the Liberal People's Party, but at the election of 1989 this reunited Venstre again failed to win parliamentary seats. In 1993 the party again failed to achieve the 4% threshold that would have made it eligible for the levelling seats in parliament, but Lars Sponheim was elected directly from Hordaland county. (Before the election, Sponheim had made the wager that he would walk across the mountains from his home in Ulvik Municipality to the parliament in the capital city Oslo if elected—a wager he delivered on, to much good-humoured interest from the press.)

In 1997, Venstre passed the 4% threshold, increasing its seats in parliament to six. As a consequence Venstre also saw its first participation in cabinet since 1973. The party held four seats in the minority first government of Kjell Magne Bondevik. Lars Sponheim became minister of industry and commerce, Odd Einar Dørum; minister of communications, later minister of justice, Guro Fjellanger; minister of environmental protection, and Eldbjørg Løwer; minister of administration, later minister of defense. Mrs. Løwer was the first female minister of defense in Norway. This cabinet resigned in 2000, refusing to accept the Storting's decision to build gas power plants. In 2001, Venstre narrowly failed to reach the 4% threshold, but had two representatives elected, Sponheim and Odd Einar Dørum. However, due to Venstre becoming part of the second coalition government of Kjell Magne Bondevik, with Sponheim and Dørum entering the cabinet, the two were represented in parliament by deputies. The party also got a third member of the cabinet, with the appointment of Torild Skogsholm as Minister of Transport and Communications.

The 2005 election gave Venstre 5.9% of the vote, its best result since the 1969 election. Venstre won six seats directly, and an additional four seats through the 4%+ compensatory system. Due to the majority of the Red-green coalition, Venstre became an opposition party.

In the 2009 election, Venstre ended up below the 4% threshold for levelling seats, leaving the party with only two seats in parliament, Trine Skei Grande and Borghild Tenden, whereas they had ten seats before the election. The same evening, 14 September 2009, Lars Sponheim announced that he would step down as party leader, as a consequence of the poor result. After the election, the party experienced growth in members. At the party conference in April 2010, Trine Skei Grande was unanimously elected as the new leader of the party.

Venstre climbed over the threshold with 5.2% in the 2013 elections and entered into coalition talks with the Conservative, Christian Democratic, and Progress parties. Venstre and the Christian Democrats decided not to enter the new Solberg Cabinet, thus leaving it without a parliamentary majority, but made a confidence and supply agreement with it.

Winning eight seats in the 2017 elections, Venstre entered into new talks with the Conservative and Progress Party coalition, and joined the coalition in January 2018 with three cabinet posts; Ola Elvestuen became Minister of Climate and Environment, Iselin Nybø Minister of Research and Higher Education, while party leader Trine Skei Grande became Minister of Culture.

== Ideology ==
The party is regarded as liberal, liberal, and centrist or centre-right. The party advocates civil liberties under the pre-condition of an active state. Since the 1970s, the party has maintained a green liberal position, which was an important part of the party profile when it came back to parliament in the 1990s. The Liberal Party was rated the second best party after the Green Party by the environmentalist organisation Framtiden i våre hender. The party is also a strong supporter of multiculturalism, increased labour immigration to Norway, and relaxed integration measures.

Through its history, it has taken part in both centre-right and pure centrist coalition governments. From 2001 to 2005, it was in a centre-right coalition government with the Conservative Party and Christian Democratic Party; since the 2005 general election, the party has been in opposition. More recently the party has been a proponent of a blue–green alliance in Norwegian politics, with Venstre constituting the green part.

In the last few election campaigns, Venstre's main focus has been on environmental issues, education, small-business and social issues. Venstre advocates higher taxes on activities that damage the environment. Some other positions advocated by Venstre are increased labour immigration, abolition of the Church of Norway as the state church, abolishing the wealth and inheritance taxes, and more power to local authorities (kommuner).

At the national convention in 2005, Venstre decided with a margin of only five votes to still oppose Norway joining the European Union, albeit weakly, while still advocating that Norway remain part of the European Economic Area. In 2020, however, a majority at the national convention voted for Venstre to support EU membership for Norway. Thus, the official stance of Venstre is now in support of Norwegian membership of the European Union. Regardless, the party retains the position that the question of potential Norwegian EU membership should only be decided by a national referendum, similar to referendums held in 1972 and 1994. Venstre additionally supports the replacement of the monarchy with a republican form of government.

In 2007, Venstre became the first Norwegian party to advocate legalizing sharing of copyrighted digital material.

== Etymology ==
While the name of the party means Left in Norwegian, the party refers to itself as a centrist party. Since the Centre Party was a component of the governing centre-left Red-green coalition, and Venstre was part of the "non-socialist" opposition, a situation has been produced where the centre party is more on the left than Left itself. When the name Left was chosen in 1884, the word did not refer to socialism in the way "Left wing" does today. It meant liberal or radicalism in comparison to the conservatives on the right, and referred to the position of the seats in Parliament. The use of the word for "left" in the names of the Danish political parties Venstre and Radikale Venstre is also meant to refer to liberalism and radicalism rather than socialism.

== Party leaders ==
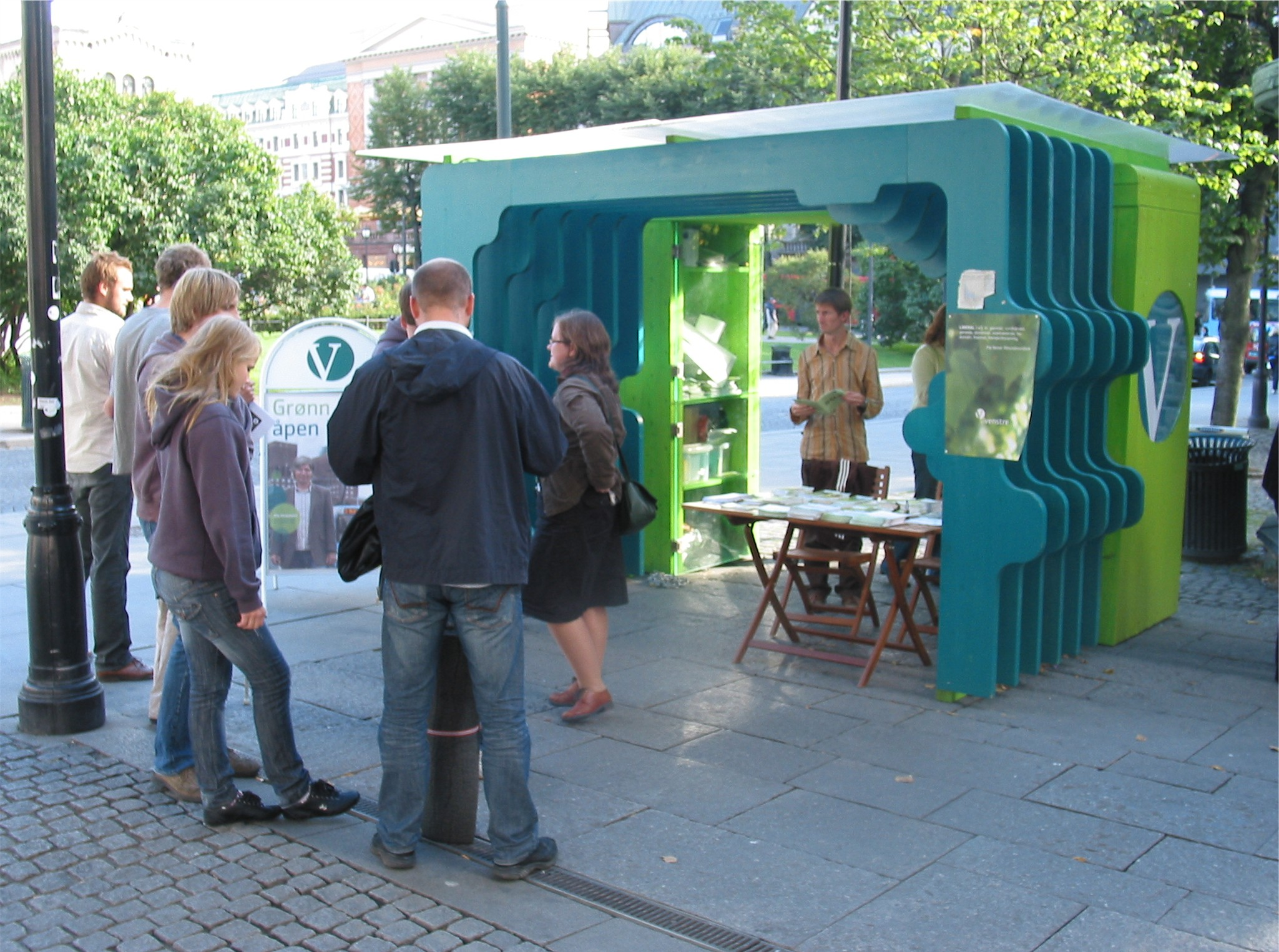
Campaign booth at Karl Johans gate ahead of the 2007 Norwegian local elections

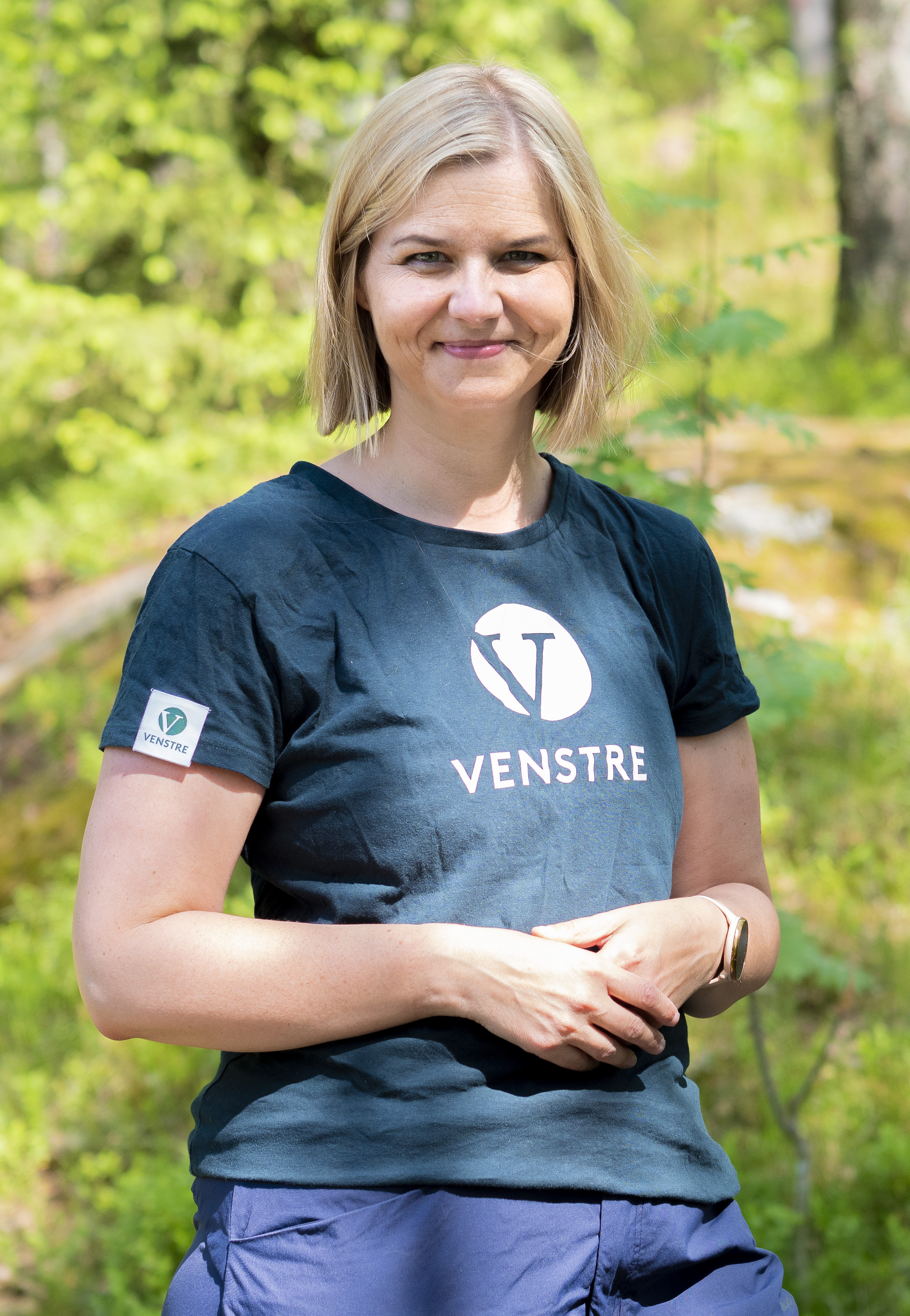
Guri Melby has been the party's leader since 26 September 2020

- 1884 Johan Sverdrup
- 1884–1889 Ole Anton Qvam
- 1889–1893 Johannes Steen
- 1893–1894 Viggo Ullmann
- 1894–1896 Ole Anton Qvam
- 1898–1900 Viggo Ullmann
- 1900–1903 Lars Holst
- 1903–1909 Carl Berner
- 1909–1927 Gunnar Knudsen
- 1927–1940 Johan Ludwig Mowinckel
- 1945–1952 Jacob S. Worm-Müller
- 1952–1964 Bent Røiseland
- 1964–1970 Gunnar Garbo
- 1970–1972 Helge Seip
- 1972–1974 Helge Rognlien
- 1974–1976 Eva Kolstad
- 1976–1982 Hans Hammond Rossbach
- 1982–1986 Odd Einar Dørum
- 1986–1990 Arne Fjørtoft
- 1990–1992 Håvard Alstadheim
- 1992–1996 Odd Einar Dørum
- 1996–2010 Lars Sponheim
- 2010–2020 Trine Skei Grande
- 2020– Guri Melby

== Prime ministers from Venstre ==
- 1884–1889 Johan Sverdrup
- 1891–1893 Johannes Steen
- 1898–1902 Johannes Steen
- 1902–1903 Otto Blehr
- 1905–1907 Christian Michelsen
- 1907–1908 Jørgen Løvland
- 1908–1910 Gunnar Knudsen
- 1913–1920 Gunnar Knudsen
- 1921–1923 Otto Blehr
- 1924–1926 Johan Ludwig Mowinckel
- 1928–1931 Johan Ludwig Mowinckel
- 1933–1935 Johan Ludwig Mowinckel

== Election results ==
=== Storting ===
| Election | Leader | Votes | % | Seats | +/– | Position | Status |
|---|---|---|---|---|---|---|---|
| 1885 | Ole Anton Qvam | 57,683 | 63.4 | 84 / 114 | ▲1 | 1st | Majority |
| 1888 | Ole Anton Qvam | 37,320 | 41.8 | 38 / 114 | ▼46 | ▼2nd | Minority (1888–1889) |
| 1888 | Ole Anton Qvam | 37,320 | 41.8 | 38 / 114 | ▼46 | ▼2nd | Opposition (1889–1891) |
| 1891 | Johannes Steen | 51,780 | 50.8 | 63 / 114 | ▲25 | ▲1st | Majority |
| 1894 | Ole Anton Qvam | 83,165 | 50.4 | 59 / 114 | ▼4 | ▲1st | Majority |
| 1897 | Johannes Steen | 87,548 | 52.7 | 79 / 114 | ▲20 | 1st | Majority |
| 1900 | Lars Holst | 127,142 | 54.0 | 77 / 114 | ▼2 | 1st | Majority |
| 1903 (Note: Contested the election in alliance with the Labour Democrats.) | Carl Berner | 101,142 | 42.7 | 48 / 117 | ▼29 | 1st | Opposition |
| 1906 | Carl Berner | 121,562 | 45.1 | 73 / 123 | ▲25 | 1st | Majority |
| 1909 | Carl Berner | 128,367 | 30.4 | 46 / 123 | ▼27 | 1st | Minority (1909–1910) |
| 1909 | Carl Berner | 128,367 | 30.4 | 46 / 123 | ▼27 | 1st | Opposition (1910–1912) |
| 1912 | Gunnar Knudsen | 195,526 | 40.0 | 76 / 123 | ▲30 | 1st | Opposition (1912–1913) |
| 1912 | Gunnar Knudsen | 195,526 | 40.0 | 76 / 123 | ▲30 | 1st | Majority (1913–1915) |
| 1915 | Gunnar Knudsen | 204,243 | 33.1 | 74 / 123 | ▲4 | 1st | Majority |
| 1918 | Gunnar Knudsen | 187,657 | 28.3 | 51 / 126 | ▼23 | 1st | Minority (1918–1920) |
| 1918 | Gunnar Knudsen | 187,657 | 28.3 | 51 / 126 | ▼23 | 1st | Opposition (1920–1921) |
| 1921 | Gunnar Knudsen | 181,989 | 20.1 | 37 / 150 | ▼14 | ▼2nd | Minority (1921–1923) |
| 1921 | Gunnar Knudsen | 181,989 | 20.1 | 37 / 150 | ▼14 | ▼2nd | Opposition (1923–1924) |
| 1924 | Gunnar Knudsen | 180,979 | 18.6 | 34 / 150 | ▼3 | 2nd | Minority 1924–1926) |
| 1924 | Gunnar Knudsen | 180,979 | 18.6 | 34 / 150 | ▼3 | 2nd | Opposition (1926–1927) |
| 1927 | Johan Ludwig Mowinckel | 172,568 | 17.3 | 30 / 150 | ▼4 | 2nd | Opposition (1927–1928) |
| 1927 | Johan Ludwig Mowinckel | 172,568 | 17.3 | 30 / 150 | ▼4 | 2nd | Minority (1928–1930) |
| 1930 | Johan Ludwig Mowinckel | 241,355 | 20.2 | 33 / 150 | ▲3 | ▼3rd | Minority (1930–1931) |
| 1930 | Johan Ludwig Mowinckel | 241,355 | 20.2 | 33 / 150 | ▲3 | ▼3rd | Opposition (1931–1933) |
| 1933 | Johan Ludwig Mowinckel | 213,153 | 17.1 | 24 / 150 | ▼9 | ▲2nd | Minority (1933–1935) |
| 1933 | Johan Ludwig Mowinckel | 213,153 | 17.1 | 24 / 150 | ▼9 | ▲2nd | Opposition (1935–1936) |
| 1936 | Johan Ludwig Mowinckel | 232,784 | 16.0 | 23 / 150 | ▼1 | ▼3rd | Opposition |
| 1945 | Jacob S. Worm-Müller | 204,852 | 13.8 | 20 / 150 | ▼3 | 3rd | Opposition |
| 1949 (Note: The Liberal Party ran on joint lists with other parties in a few constituencies in most elections from 1949 to 1981. Vote numbers are from independent Liberal Party lists only, while vote percentage also includes the Liberal Party's estimated share from joint lists (Statistics Norway estimates).) | Jacob S. Worm-Müller | 218,866 | 13.1 | 21 / 150 | ▲1 | 3rd | Opposition |
| 1953 | Bent Røiseland | 177,662 | 10.0 | 15 / 150 | ▼6 | 3rd | Opposition |
| 1957 | Bent Røiseland | 171,407 | 9.7 | 15 / 150 | Steady | 3rd | Opposition |
| 1961 | Bent Røiseland | 132,429 | 8.8 | 14 / 150 | ▼1 | ▼4th | Opposition (1961–1963) |
| 1961 | Bent Røiseland | 132,429 | 8.8 | 14 / 150 | ▼1 | ▼4th | Coalition (1963) |
| 1961 | Bent Røiseland | 132,429 | 8.8 | 14 / 150 | ▼1 | ▼4th | Opposition (1963–1965) |
| 1965 | Gunnar Garbo | 207,834 | 10.4 | 18 / 150 | ▲4 | ▲3rd | Coalition |
| 1969 | Gunnar Garbo | 202,553 | 9.4 | 13 / 150 | ▼5 | ▼5th | Coalition (1969–1971) |
| 1969 | Gunnar Garbo | 202,553 | 9.4 | 13 / 150 | ▼5 | ▼5th | Opposition (1971–1972) |
| 1969 | Gunnar Garbo | 202,553 | 9.4 | 13 / 150 | ▼5 | ▼5th | Coalition (1972–1973) |
| 1973 | Helge Rognlien | 49,668 | 3.5 | 2 / 155 | ▼11 | ▼7th | Opposition |
| 1977 | Hans Hammond Rossbach | 54,243 | 3.2 | 2 / 155 | Steady | ▲6th | Opposition |
| 1981 | Hans Hammond Rossbach | 79,064 | 3.9 | 2 / 155 | Steady | ▼7th | Opposition |
| 1985 | Odd Einar Dørum | 81,202 | 3.1 | 0 / 157 | ▼2 | 7th | No seats |
| 1989 | Arne Fjørtoft | 84,740 | 3.2 | 0 / 165 | Steady | 7th | No seats |
| 1993 | Odd Einar Dørum | 88,985 | 3.6 | 1 / 165 | ▲1 | 7th | Opposition |
| 1997 | Lars Sponheim | 115,077 | 4.5 | 6 / 165 | ▲5 | 7th | Coalition (1997–2000) |
| 1997 | Lars Sponheim | 115,077 | 4.5 | 6 / 165 | ▲5 | 7th | Opposition (2000–2001) |
| 2001 | Lars Sponheim | 98,486 | 3.9 | 2 / 165 | ▼4 | 7th | Coalition |
| 2005 | Lars Sponheim | 156,113 | 5.9 | 10 / 169 | ▲8 | 7th | Opposition |
| 2009 | Lars Sponheim | 104,144 | 3.9 | 2 / 169 | ▼8 | 7th | Opposition |
| 2013 | Trine Skei Grande | 148,275 | 5.2 | 9 / 169 | ▲7 | ▲6th | External support |
| 2017 | Trine Skei Grande | 127,483 | 4.4 | 8 / 169 | ▼1 | 6th | External support (2017–2018) |
| 2017 | Trine Skei Grande | 127,483 | 4.4 | 8 / 169 | ▼1 | 6th | Coalition (2018–2021) |
| 2021 | Guri Melby | 137,433 | 4.6 | 8 / 169 | Steady | ▼7th | Opposition |
| 2025 | Guri Melby | 118,941 | 3.7 | 3 / 169 | ▼5 | ▼9th | Opposition |

== See also ==
- Liberalism
- List of liberal theorists
- Liberal parties by country
- Liberal democracy
- Liberalism in Norway
