= Johannson =

Johannson is a surname. Notable people with the surname include:

- Hartvig Johannson (1875–1957), Norwegian businessman
- Jim Johannson (1964–2018), American ice hockey player, coach and executive
- Johan Johannson (1881–1958), Norwegian businessman
- Johan Johannson (1911–2004), Norwegian businessman
- Johan Johannson (1967) (born 1967), Norwegian businessman
- John Johannson (born 1961), American ice hockey player
- Johan Johannson (1881–1958), Norwegian businessman
- Ken Johannson (1930–2018), Canadian-born American ice hockey player, coach and executive
- Knut Hartvig Johannson (born 1937), Norwegian politician
- Rune B. Johansson (1915–1982), Swedish politician
- Wally Johannson (born 1936), Canadian politician

== See also ==
- Johanson
- Johansson
- Jóhannsson
