= Johan Johannson =

Johan Johannson may refer to:

- Johan Johannson (1881–1958), Norwegian businessman
- Johan Johannson (1911–2004), Norwegian businessman
- Johan Johannson (1967) (born 1967), Norwegian businessman
- Jóhann Jóhannsson (1969-2018), Icelandic composer
