= Gol Church =

Church in Buskerud, Norway

- Gol kyrkje
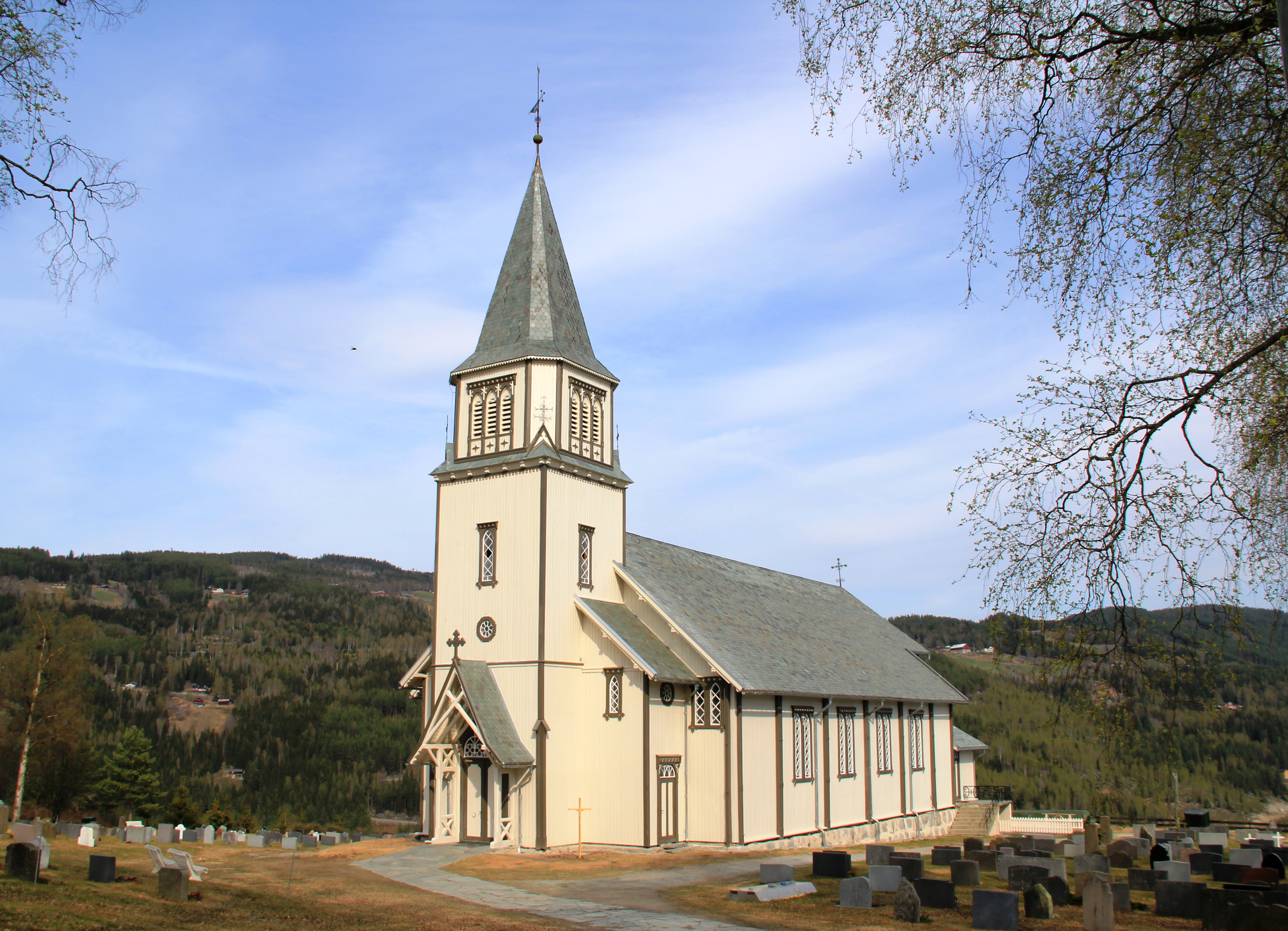
- View of the church
- Gol Church
- 60°42′35″N 8°55′06″E
- Location: Gol Municipality, Buskerud
- Country: Norway
- Denomination: Church of Norway
- Previous denomination: Catholic Church
- Churchmanship: Evangelical Lutheran

History
- Status: Parish church
- Founded: 12th century
- Consecrated: 8 June 1882

Architecture
- Functional status: Active
- Architect: Henrik Nissen
- Architectural type: Long church
- Completed: 1881 (145 years ago)

Specifications
- Capacity: 500
- Materials: Wood

Administration
- Diocese: Tunsberg
- Deanery: Hallingdal prosti
- Parish: Gol og Herad
- Norwegian Cultural Heritage Site
- Type: Church
- Status: Listed
- ID: 84274

Gol Church (Nynorsk: Gol kyrkje) is a parish church of the Church of Norway in Gol Municipality in Buskerud county, Norway. It is located in the village of Gol. It is one of the churches for the Gol og Herad parish which is part of the Hallingdal prosti (deanery) in the Diocese of Tunsberg. The off-white, wooden church was built in a long church design in 1882 using plans drawn up by the architect Henrik Nissen. The church seats about 500 people.

== History ==
Gol has had a church since the Middle Ages. The first church in Gol was the Gol Stave Church, which now stands at the Norwegian Museum of Cultural History in Oslo. The old church is believed to have been built around the year 1200 on the old church site about 400 metres (1,300 ft) southwest of the current church site.

The church, like most other churches in Norway, was sold into private ownership during the Norwegian church sale in 1723 to help the King pay off war debts. The stave church (and nearby Hemsedal Church) was purchased by farmer Ole Markegaard. It then had several owners before the then owner Ola Hagen waived all rights and income related to the church in 1877 and gave it over to the municipality. In 1880, the municipality decided to build a new church for the parish. It was decided to move the church site 400 metres (1,300 ft) to the northeast, at a more convenient site. Henrik Nissen was hired to design the church. In the summer of 1880, work began on the new church, led by the builder Andreas E. Sørlie from Snarum. The church was completed on 15 September 1881, but was not consecrated until 8 June 1882. It is a wooden long church with a bell tower on the west end. The tower is timber-framed while the nave and choir are log construction. The choir is surrounded by sacristies. There is a church porch at the foot of the tower.

After the new church was completed, the municipality had planned to demolish the centuries-old stave church, but instead it was saved from destruction by the Society for the Preservation of Ancient Norwegian Monuments, which bought the materials in order to re-erect the church elsewhere. The remains of the original medieval construction were documented before transport. Original murals and medieval artifacts survived. Most of the main construction remained intact and in original form, although practically all of the exterior wood dates from the 1884–1885 restoration. It was then acquired by King Oscar II, who financed its relocation and restoration as the central building of his private open-air museum near Oslo. Architect Waldemar Hansteen assessed the condition of the conserved parts and made a plan for restoration. The restoration was overseen by Waldemar Hansteen and was completed in 1885. In 1907, the open-air museum, the world's first, was merged with the Norwegian Museum of Cultural History, which now manages the stave church. The church, however, is still nominally the property of the reigning monarch of Norway.

== Media gallery ==

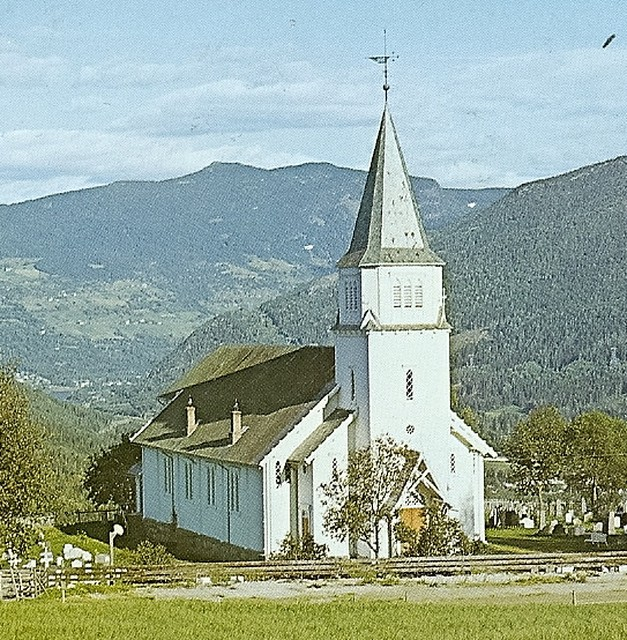

== See also ==
- List of churches in Tunsberg
