= Rud Church =

Church in Buskerud, Norway

- Rud kirke
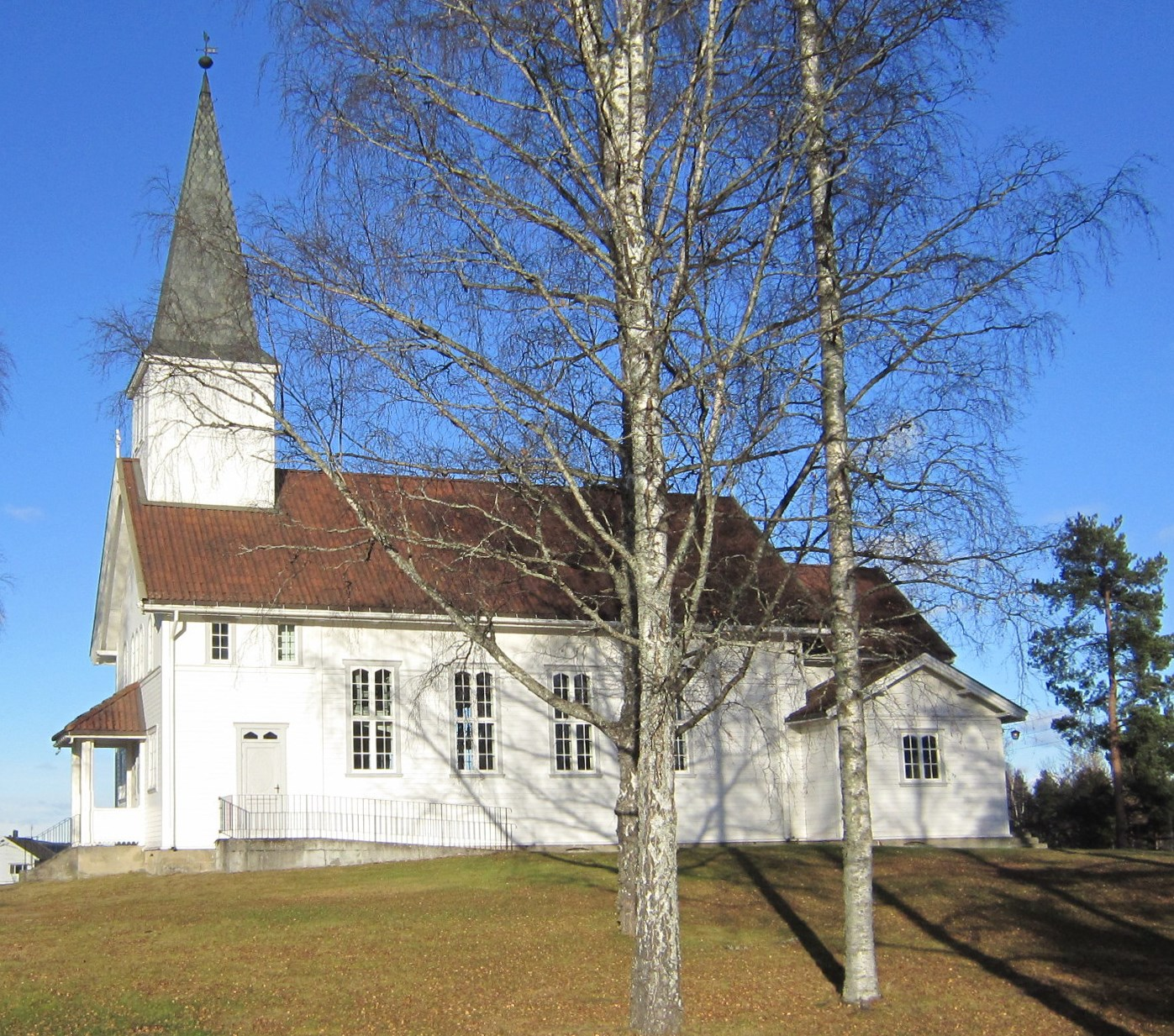
- View of the church
- Rud Church
- 60°00′58″N 10°00′47″E
- Location: Modum, Buskerud
- Country: Norway
- Denomination: Church of Norway
- Churchmanship: Evangelical Lutheran

History
- Former name: Ruud Chapel
- Status: Parish church
- Founded: 1917
- Consecrated: 27 Sept 1917

Architecture
- Functional status: Active
- Architect: Hans Horn
- Architectural type: Long church
- Completed: 1917 (109 years ago)

Specifications
- Capacity: 158
- Materials: Wood

Administration
- Diocese: Tunsberg
- Deanery: Eiker prosti
- Parish: Modum
- Norwegian Cultural Heritage Site
- Type: Church
- Status: Not protected
- ID: 85322

Rud Church (Norwegian: Rud kirke) is a parish church of the Church of Norway in Modum Municipality in Buskerud county, Norway. It is located in the village of Drolsum. It is one of the churches for the Modum parish which is part of the Eiker prosti (deanery) in the Diocese of Tunsberg. The white, wooden church was built in a long church design in 1917 using plans drawn up by the architect . The church seats about 158 people.

== History ==
In the 1870s, it was decided to build two new chapels in Modum Municipality: Rud Chapel and Vestre Spone Chapel. Henrik Nissen made designs for both chapels. Vestre Spone Chapel was built and consecrated in 1880, but the construction of Rud Chapel was postponed for well over forty years. In 1914, new drawings for Rud Chapel were prepared by Hans Horn (the drawing were quite reminiscent of the ones that Henrik Nissen drew). The new chapel was built in 1917 and it was consecrated on 27 September 1917. Originally the title of the building was "Ruud Chapel", but more recently it has been called "Rud Church". The building is a timber-framed long church with a rectangular nave and the choir is almost square. It is surrounded by the priest's sacristy to the north and the baptismal waiting room to the south. The interior was heavily damaged in a fire in 1969. After the fire, the baptismal sacristy was expanded somewhat eastward.

== See also ==
- List of churches in Tunsberg
