= Johan Johannson (1911–2004) =

Norwegian businessperson

Johan Johannson (9 June 1911 – 11 July 2004) was a Norwegian businessperson.

He was a son of wholesaler Ole Hartvig Nissen Johannson. He was thus a paternal grandson of Johan Johannson and maternal great-grandson of Hartvig Nissen, and nephew of Johan Johannson.

He took over the family company, wholesaler Joh. Johannson, from his father. He was the thus third generation to run the company and was hired in the company in 1935 and he became co-owner in 1941. He was also a co-founder of Kolonialgrossistenes Kundeservice in 1946 and chaired Norske Colonialgrossisters Forbund from 1951 to 1957. Johan Johannson was a supervisory council member of Livsforsikringsselskapet Idun, Storebrand, deputy supervisory council member of the Norwegian America Line, and a board member of the libertarian organization Libertas.

He died in 2004 and was buried in Ris.
