= Hartvig Johannson =

Norwegian businessman

Ole Hartvig Nissen Johannson, MBE (24 August 1875 – 1957) was a Norwegian businessperson.

== Personal life ==
He was born in Kristiania as a son of consul-general Johan Johannson and Helga Johanne Arentz Nissen (born 1855). He was a maternal grandson of school founder Hartvig Nissen, and thereby a nephew of Per Schjelderup Nissen and Henrik Nissen; and second cousin of prison director Hartvig Nissen and Kristian Nissen. He was also a brother of Johan Johannson.

In 1908 he married Bolette Margrethe Nissen Kaurin, daughter of a chief physician in Molde, Edvard Kaurin and his wife Bolette Margrethe Nissen. They had the son Johan Johannson, Jr, who took over the family business. Bolette Margrethe Nissen was a sister of Hartvig Johannson's mother, making Hartvig and his wife first cousins.

== Career ==
He finished his education at Kristiania Commerce School in 1893, and took further education in France, Germany and England between 1896 and 1898. In 1907 he became a partner in the family company Joh. Johannson, a wholesaling company.

He chaired Colonialgrossistenes Landsforening from 1915 to 1920, Norges Grossistforbund from 1924 to 1927 and Oslo Handelsstands Forening from 1927 to 1930. He also chaired, and was an honorary member of, Creditreformforeningen for Norge. He was furthermore a board member of Christiania Bank og Kreditkasse from 1930 to 1946 (chairing it during the Second World War), the Norwegian America Line from 1925 to 1948, Tofte Cellulosefabrik, Oslo Port Authority and the Norwegian Trekking Association. He chaired the supervisory council of Oslo Havnelager.

He was decorated as a Knight, First Class of the Order of St. Olav and a Member of the Order of the British Empire. He died in 1957.
