= Borgestad Church =

Church in Telemark, Norway

- Borgestad kirke
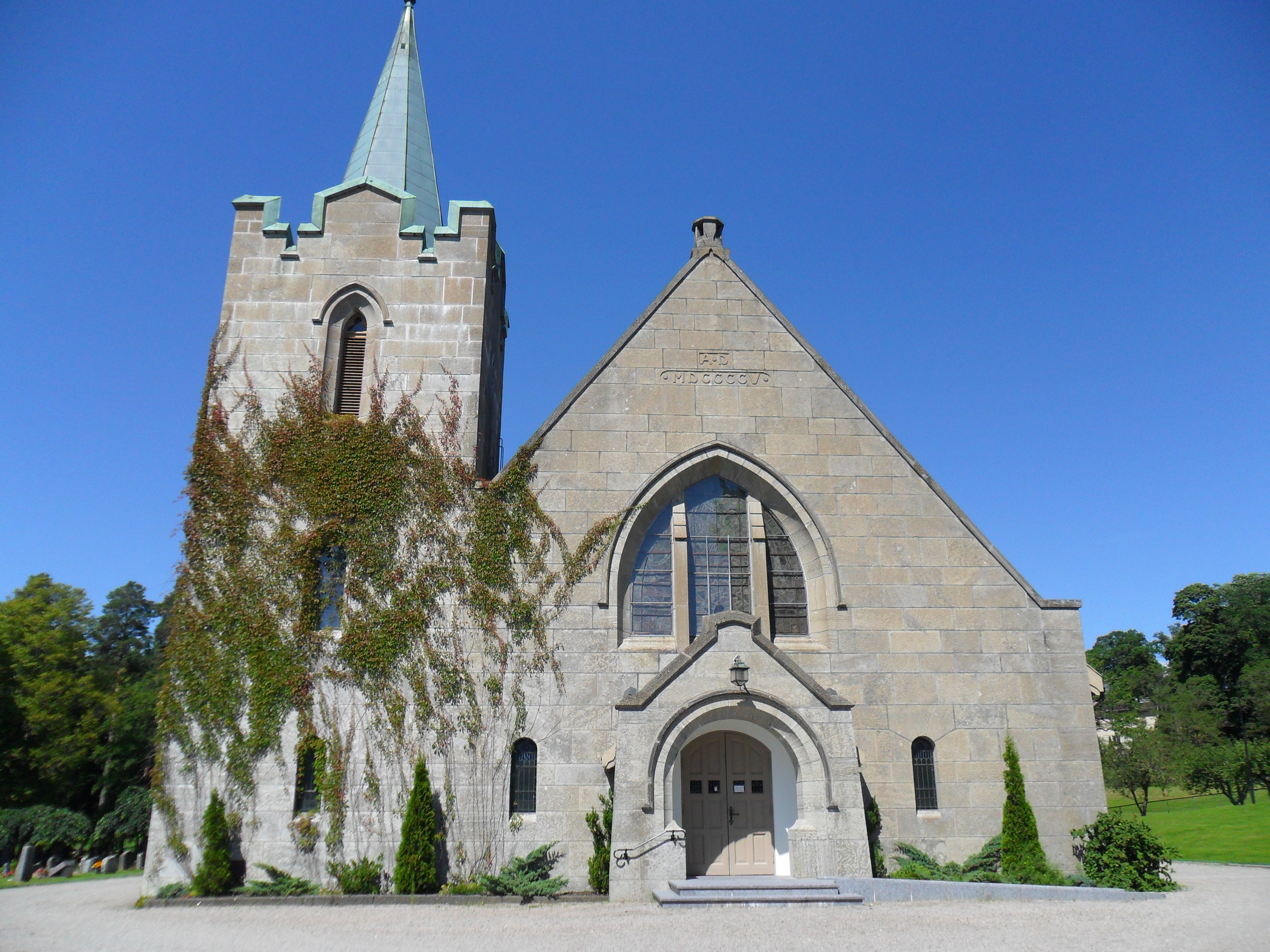
- View of the church
- Borgestad Church
- 59°09′37″N 9°39′28″E
- Location: Skien Municipality, Telemark
- Country: Norway
- Denomination: Church of Norway
- Churchmanship: Evangelical Lutheran

History
- Status: Parish church
- Founded: 1907
- Consecrated: 24 May 1907

Architecture
- Functional status: Active
- Architect: J.H. Nissen
- Architectural type: Long church
- Completed: 1907 (119 years ago)

Specifications
- Capacity: 382
- Materials: Stone

Administration
- Diocese: Agder og Telemark
- Deanery: Skien prosti
- Parish: Borgestad
- Norwegian Cultural Heritage Site
- Type: Church
- Status: Listed
- ID: 83931

Borgestad Church (Norwegian: Borgestad kirke) is a parish church of the Church of Norway in Skien Municipality in Telemark county, Norway. It is located in the village of Borgestad. It is the church for the Borgestad parish which is part of the Skien prosti (deanery) in the Diocese of Agder og Telemark. The white, stone church was built in a long church design in 1907 using plans drawn up by the architect Henrik Nissen. The church seats about 382 people.

== History ==
The earliest existing historical records of the church date back to the year 1398, but the church was not built that year. The church was probably located on a site about 200 metres (660 ft) to the southwest of the present church site. Very little is known about that church and it was likely closed down by the sometime before the Reformation.

In the early 1900s, Prime Minister Gunnar Knudsen gave land and financed the construction of a new church in Borgestad. The new building was designed by Henrik Nissen. Construction of the new building began in the winter of 1903–1904 and continued until 1906. The new church was consecrated on 24 May 1907. The new limestone long church was inspired by English country churches. It has an asymmetrically placed bell tower, which was popular at the time. The church has an entrance in the south, and in the north is a choir which is surrounded by vestries. The church was decorated with stained glass by Emanuel Vigeland in 1918–1919 and it was painted inside by Ulrik Hendriksen in 1921. The building received electric lighting for its fiftieth anniversary in 1957. In April 2011, there was an arson attempt on a bench outside Borgestad church, this was the same night that the Østre Porsgrunn Church burned down due to arson.

== Media gallery ==
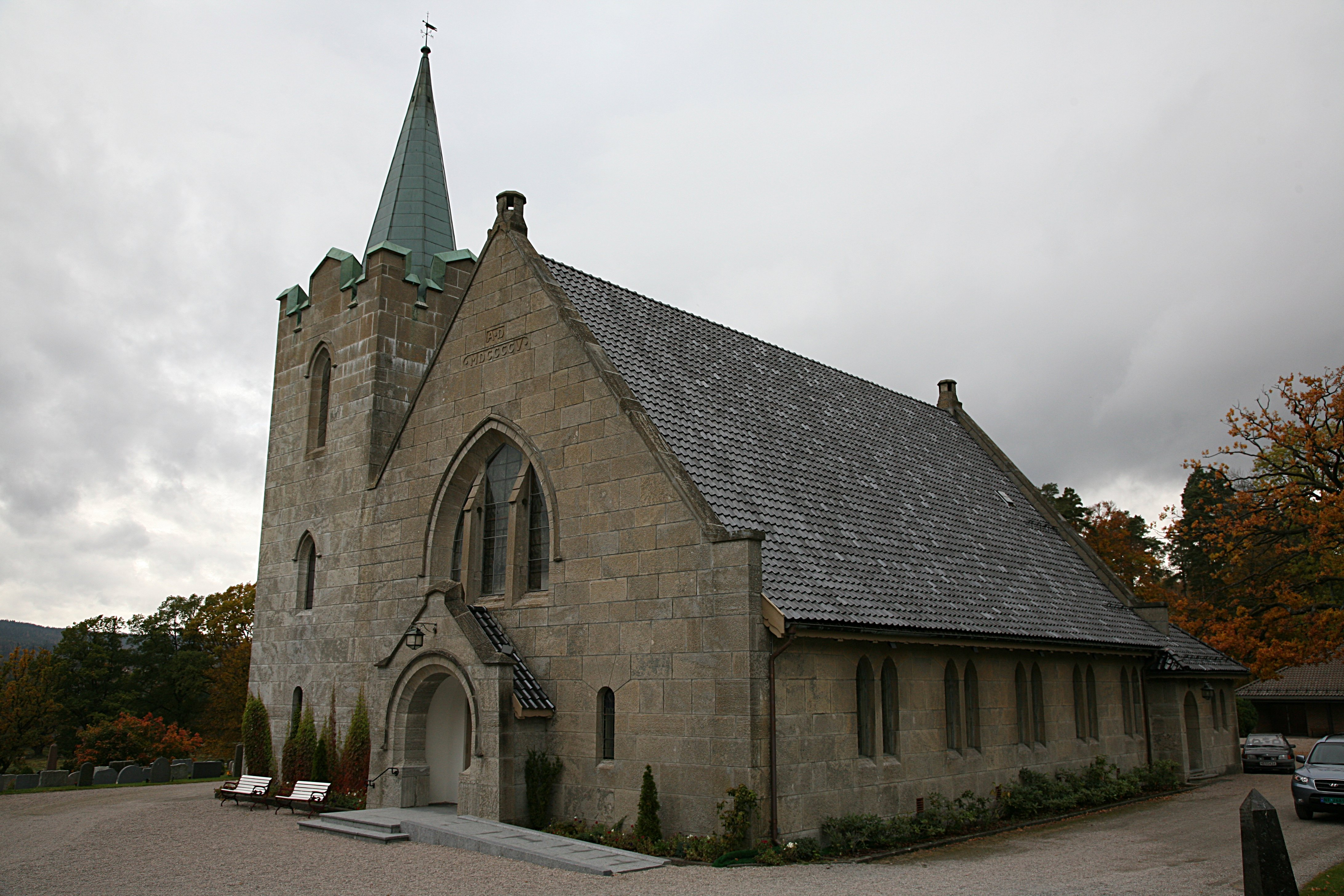

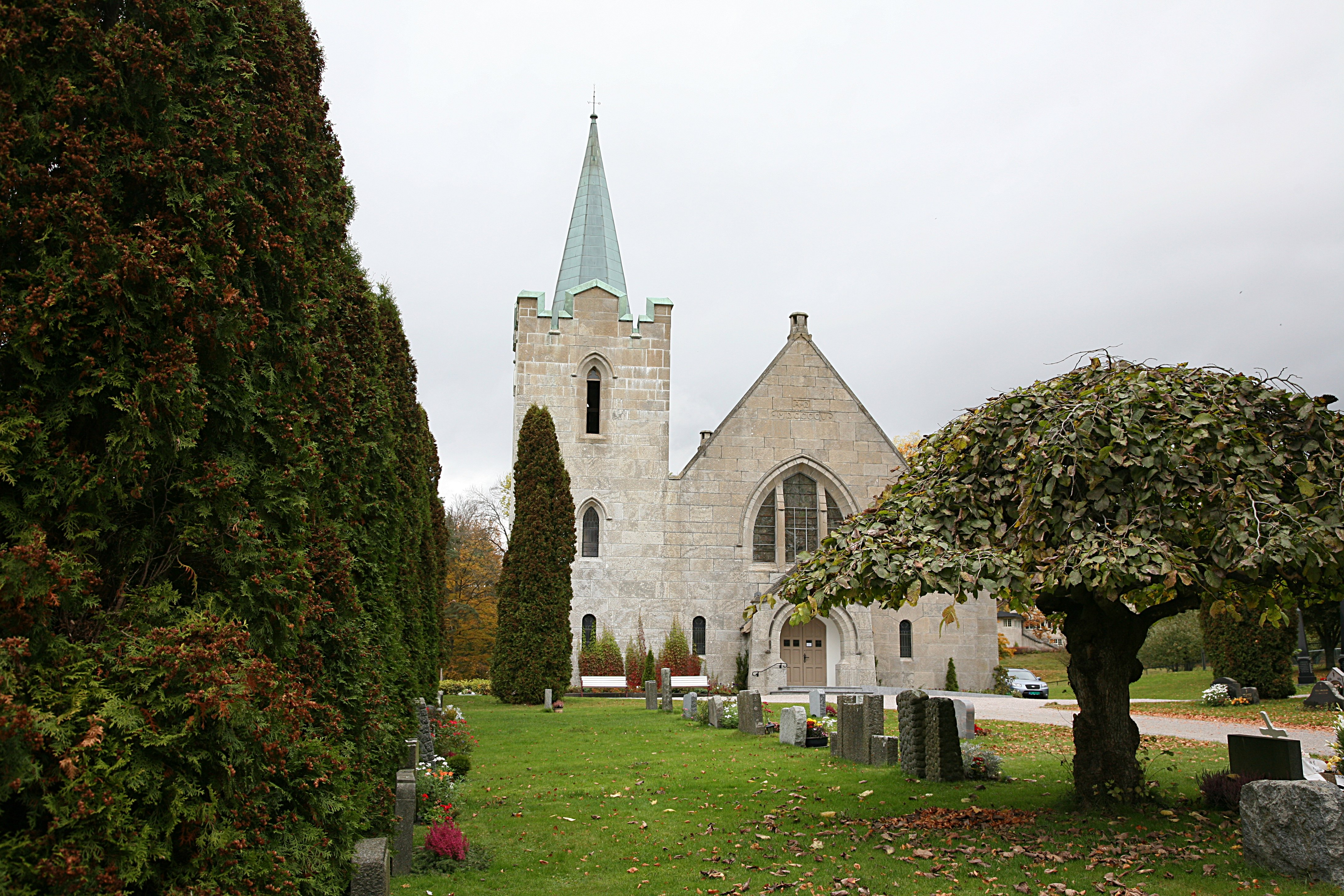

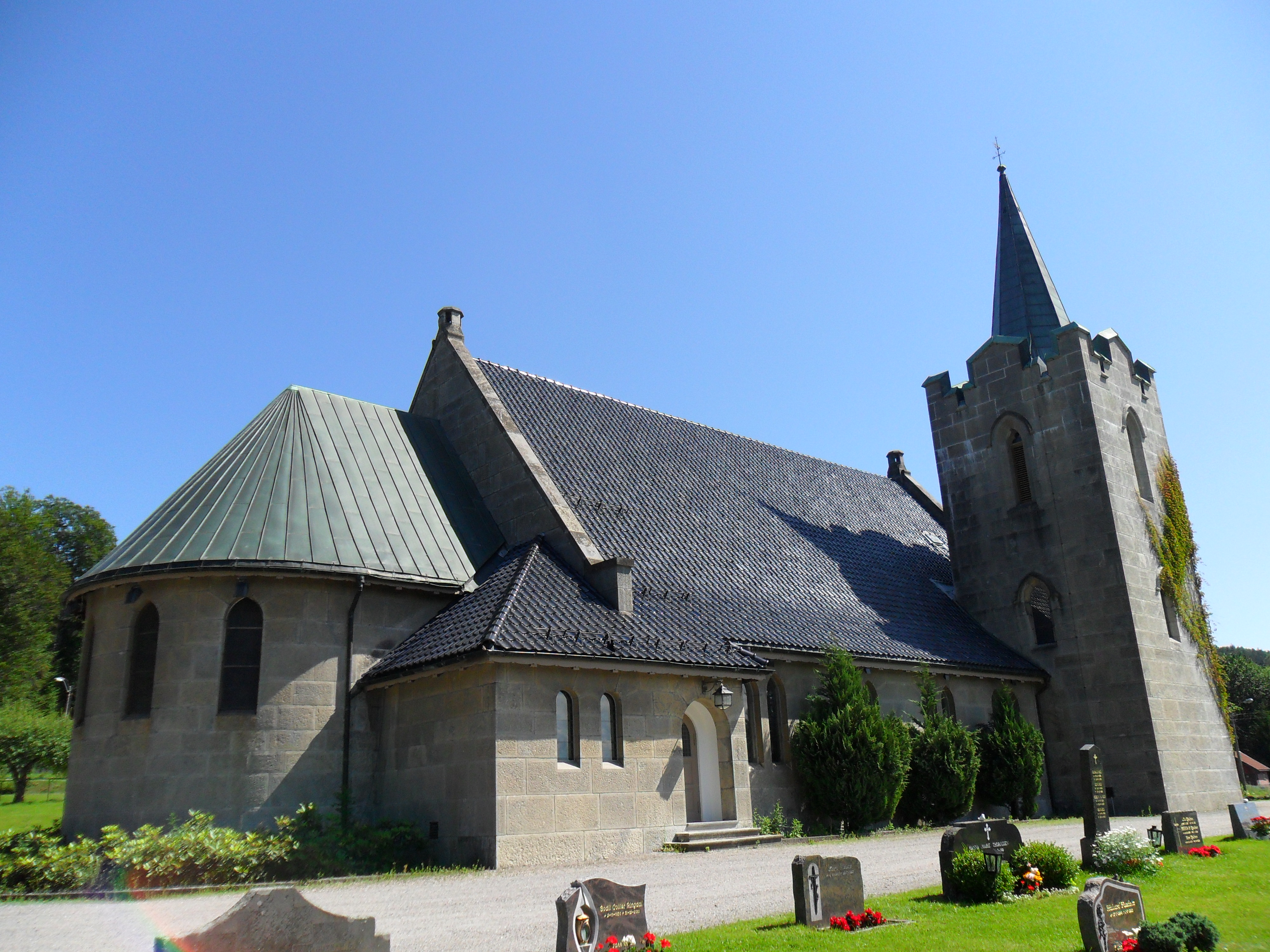

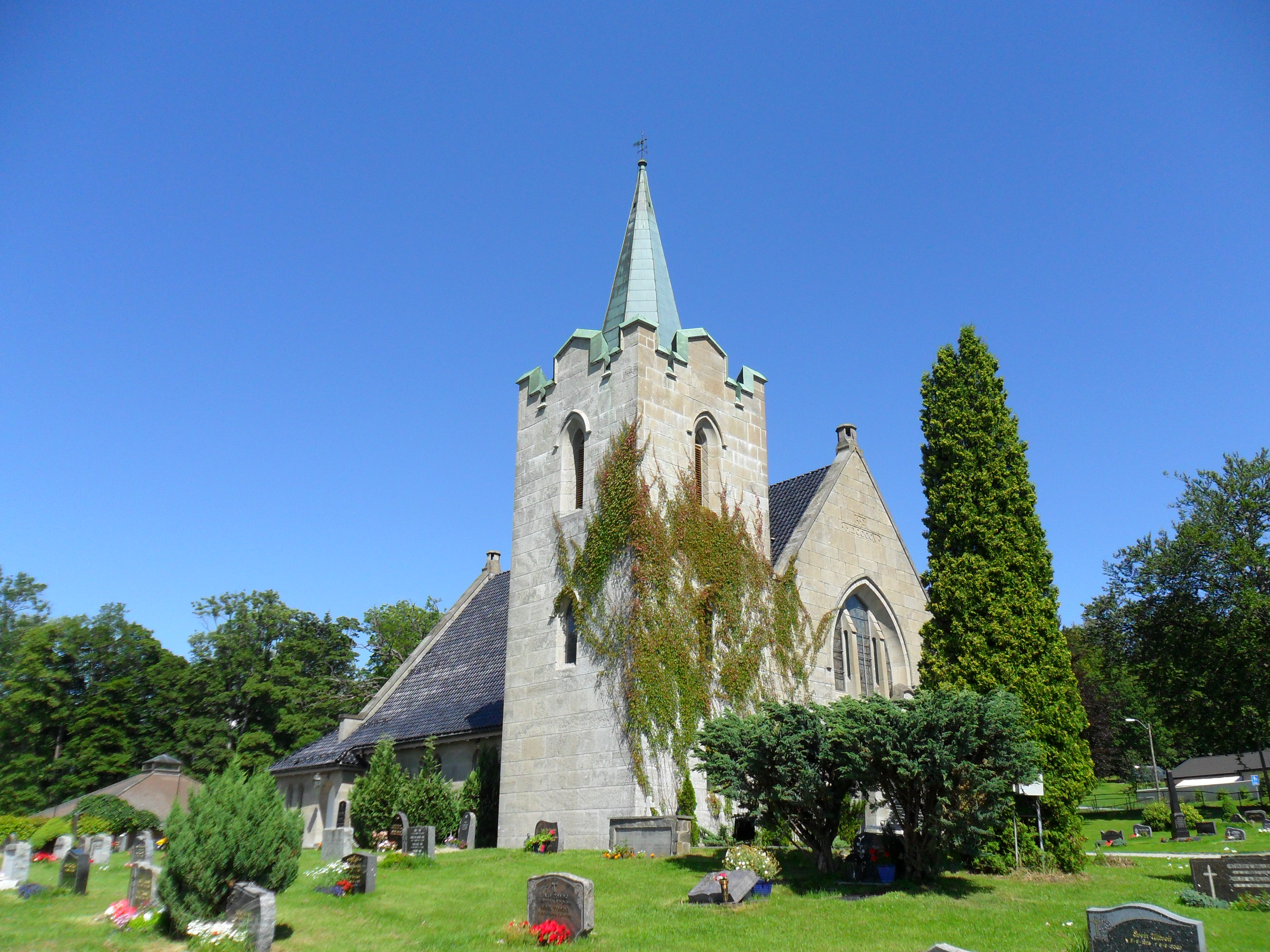

== See also ==
- List of churches in Agder og Telemark
