= Anita Schjøll Abildgaard =

Norwegian businessperson

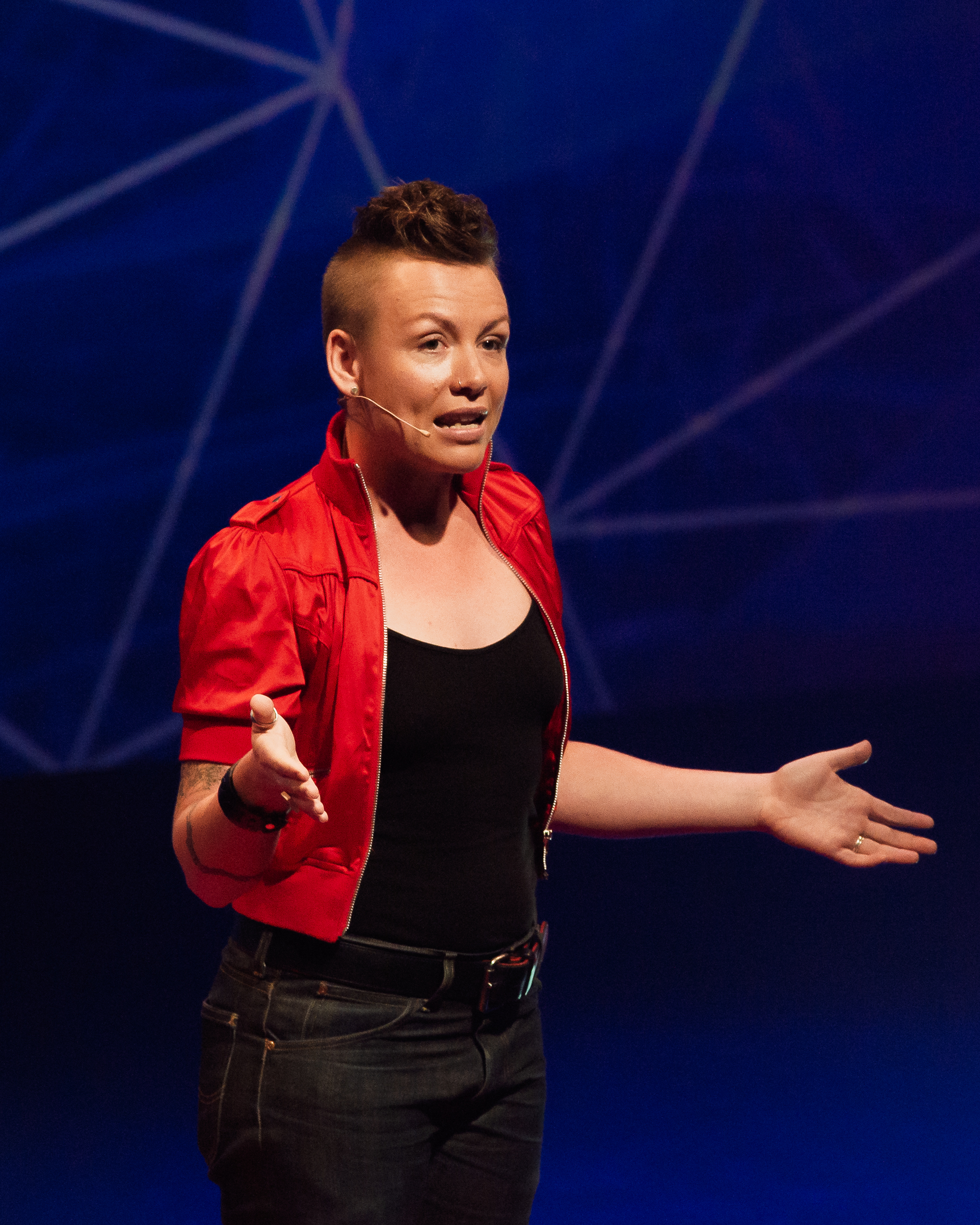
- Schjøll Abildgaard at TEDxArendal, Norway, 2016, photo by Birgit Fostervold
- Born: 16 November 1985 (age 40); Lofoten
- Education: Singularity University, Chalmers University of Technology
- Occupation: CEO
- Known for: Iris.AI

Anita Schjøll Abildgaard, previously Schjøll Brede, (born 1985) is a Norwegian entrepreneur, co-founder and CEO of Iris.AI.

== Early life ==
Schjøll Abildgaard grew up in Bærum, Norway.

== Education ==
Schjøll Abildgaard received her Bachelor in Theatre and Communication studies. She also studied a master's degree in entrepreneurship at Chalmers University of Technology in Gothenburg. She studied later at the Singularity University in California.

== Professional career ==
Before starting Iris.AI in 2015, Schjøll Abildgaard lead the startup Pinexo. Iris.AI is her fourth own startup. Iris.ai was founded at Ames Research Center. Iris.AI raised $2.4 million in December 2017. Users include Denmark's Leo Pharma, the University of Helsinki and universities in Norway. Admission costs the universities around 250,000 NOK a year.

Her key connections are Christine Spiten, Erna Solberg, Odd Reitan, Johann Johannson and Arne Wilhelmsen. She was a board member of the Ulstein Group in 2018. She was also a board member of Katapult Group and NORA Startup (Norwegian Artificial Intelligence Research Consortium). Iris.ai was announced as a Top 10 Semifinalist in the AI XPRIZE.

== Awards ==
Schjøll Abildgaard is listed on "The World's Top 50 Women in Tech 2018" and "Europe's Top 50 Women in Tech 2018" by the magazine Forbes.

She has delivered a TEDx talk in 2016. In total, she did 2 TEDx talks.

She is alumni of 500 Startups and Tech Crunch Startup Battlefield.
