= Høvik Church =

- Høvik kirke
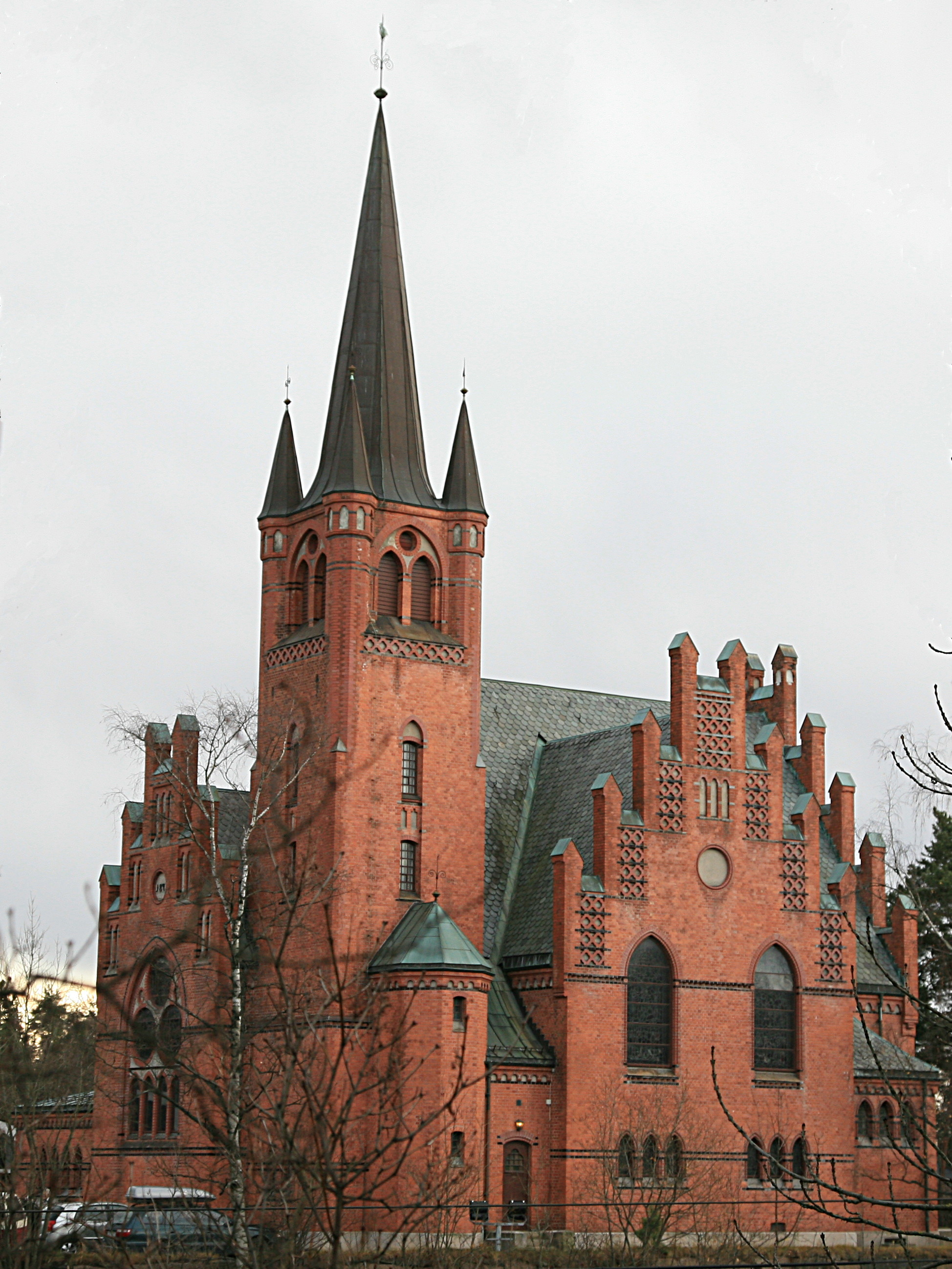

- Location of the church Høvik Church (Norway)
- 59°53′57.214″N 10°34′38.827″E
- Location: Høvik; Bærum,
- Country: Norway
- Denomination: Church of Norway
- Churchmanship: Evangelical Lutheran
- Website: www.hovik-menighet.no

History
- Status: Parish church
- Consecrated: 1898

Architecture
- Functional status: Active
- Architect: Henrik Nissen
- Style: Neo Gothic
- Completed: 1898, extended in 1948

Specifications
- Capacity: 500
- Materials: Brick

Administration
- Diocese: Diocese of Oslo
- Deanery: Bærum
- Parish: Høvik

Høvik Church is a cruciform church in Bærum in Akershus county, Norway. The building is in brick and has 500 seats.

== History ==
The church was consecrated on March 31, 1898. The building of the church started in 1895, after drawings by Norwegian architect Henrik Nissen (1848–1915). The church is made of red brick, with some details in glazed black brick and lime-plastered surfaces. The church is done in a lively English-inspired Neo-Gothic style, and forms a distinctly asymmetrical motif at Drammensveien by the European route E18. Høvik Church is a landmark, located on a mountain cliff, 5 kilometres (3.1 mi) west of the border to the city of Oslo.

The interior of the church is richly decorated with stained glass, created by various artists for different periods of time. On the walls hang paintings, painted by different artists. The altarpiece is made in Neo Gothic style and the materials wood and brass are used to create a crucifix. The church organ from 1922 has 25 voices, created by organ builder J. H. Jørgensen.

The church is listed by the Norwegian Directorate for Cultural Heritage.
