= Johan Johannson (businessman, born 1967) =

Norwegian businessman (born 1967)

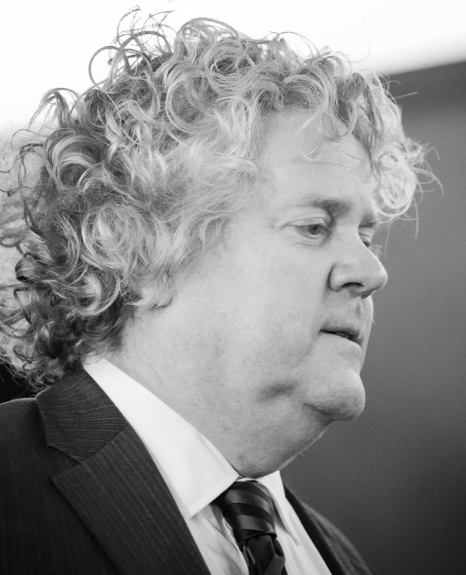
- Johannson in 2017
- Born: 1 January 1967 (age 59)
- Occupations: Businessman, Heir to Joh. Johannson
- Known for: Owns nearly 75% of NorgesGruppen
- Spouse: Married
- Children: 3
- Parent: Knut Hartvig Johannson

Johan Johannson (born 1967) is a Norwegian billionaire businessman, and owns nearly 75% of the NorgesGruppen supermarket chain, that he inherited from his father.

The son of Knut Hartvig Johannson, he is an heir of the wholesaler company Joh. Johannson, established in 1866. Today, Joh. Johannson is a part of the NorgesGruppen corporation, where Johan Johannson has been a member of the board.

In 2008, he was considered to be the third wealthiest person in Norway, with a fortune of NOK 18.5 billion, approximately US$3.15 billion. He owns nearly 75% of NorgesGruppen. By the end of December 2020, Bloomberg estimated Johan's net worth to be US$ 5.31 Billion.

Johannson is married, with three children, and lives in Oslo, Norway. He is known for keeping a low public profile. According to Forbes, his key connections are Christine Spiten, Anita Schjøll Brede, Erna Solberg, Odd Reitan and Kjell Inge Rokke.
