= Hemsedal Church =

Church in Buskerud, Norway

- Hemsedal kyrkje
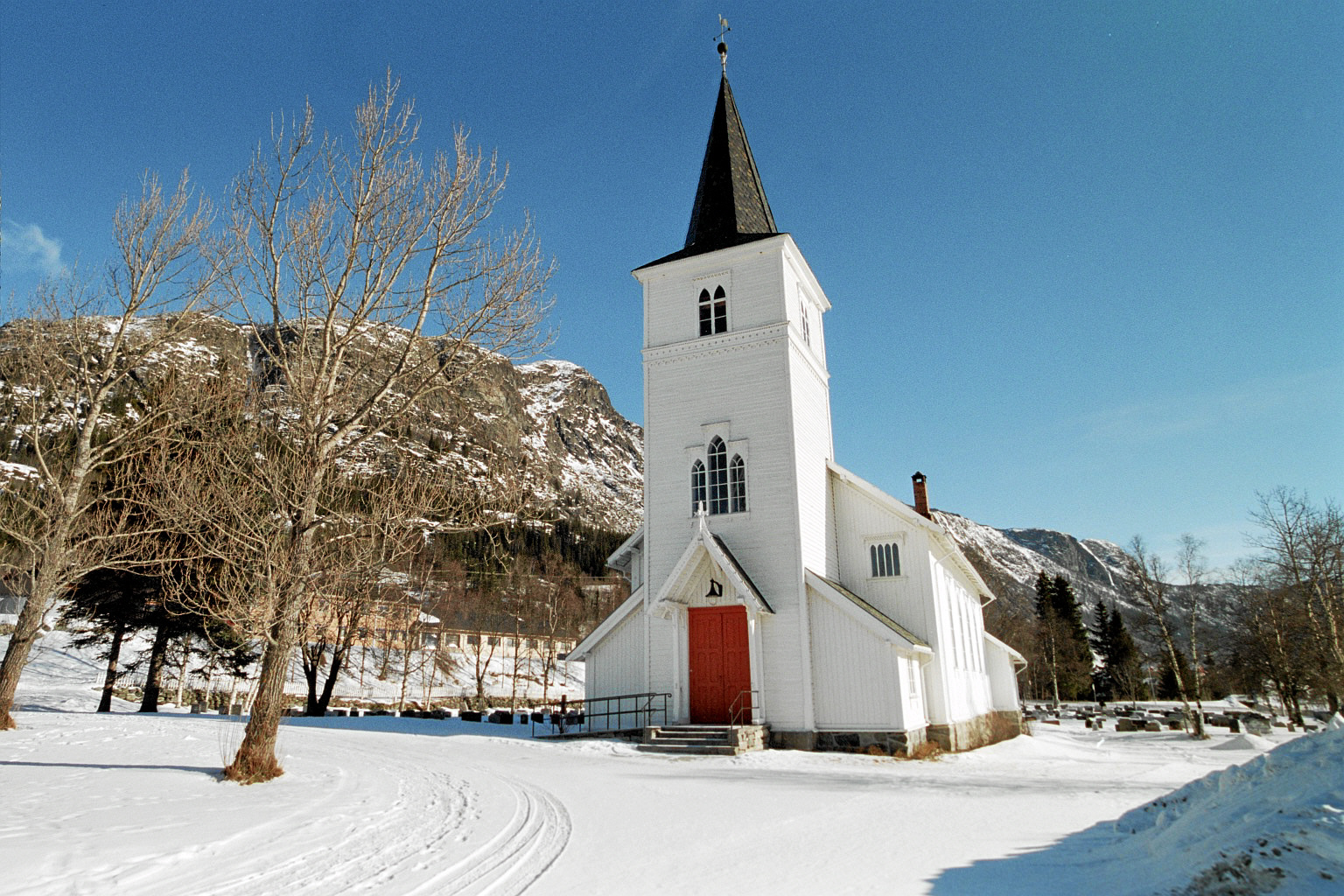
- View of the church
- Hemsedal Church
- 60°51′43″N 8°33′48″E
- Location: Hemsedal, Buskerud
- Country: Norway
- Denomination: Church of Norway
- Previous denomination: Catholic Church
- Churchmanship: Evangelical Lutheran

History
- Status: Parish church
- Founded: 12th century
- Consecrated: 9 June 1882

Architecture
- Functional status: Active
- Architect: Henrik Nissen
- Architectural type: Long church
- Completed: 1882 (144 years ago)

Specifications
- Capacity: 360
- Materials: Wood

Administration
- Diocese: Tunsberg
- Deanery: Hallingdal prosti
- Parish: Hemsedal
- Norwegian Cultural Heritage Site
- Type: Church
- Status: Not protected
- ID: 84545

Hemsedal Church (Nynorsk: Hemsedal kyrkje) is a parish church of the Church of Norway in Hemsedal Municipality in Buskerud county, Norway. It is located in the village of Hemsedal. It is one of the churches for the Hemsedal parish which is part of the Hallingdal prosti (deanery) in the Diocese of Tunsberg. The white, wooden church was built in a long church design in 1882 using plans drawn up by the architect Henrik Nissen. The church seats about 360 people.

== History ==
The earliest existing historical records of the church date back to the year 1282, but the church was not built that year. The first church in Hemsedal was probably a small post church dating to the mid- to late-1100s. This earlier structure had earth-set posts, a nearly square choir measuring about 2 by 2 metres (6 ft 7 in × 6 ft 7 in), and an elongated, rectangular nave measuring about 3.5 by 5 metres (11 ft × 16 ft). It was located about 1 kilometre (0.62 mi) to the northwest of the present church on the hill overlooking the valley. Evidence of this church and its surrounding graveyard were discovered during archaeological excavations in 1963.

The second church in Hemsedal was a wooden stave church that was probably constructed in the first half of the 13th century. The stave church featured a nearly square nave measuring about 7.1 by 6.6 metres (23 ft × 22 ft) and a narrower, nearly square chancel measuring about 4.5 by 4.5 metres (15 ft × 15 ft) with an apse on the end. The building was surrounded by an external open-air porch (svalgang). The choir of the stave church was demolished in 1714, and a new choir twice as large was built in its place by the builder Ole Poulsen. The new choir was approximately 6.5 by 6 metres (21 ft × 20 ft).

The stave church, like most other churches in Norway, was sold into private ownership during the Norwegian church sale in 1723 to help the King pay off war debts. It had various owners until 1877 when the local residents took over ownership of the church. In the same year, the municipality decided to build a new church down in the valley floor to replace the ancient stave church. The architect Henrik Nissen was contacted in February 1878. He designed a new neo-Gothic long church that would be built out of log construction. The church was built under the supervision of builder Svenum from Bergen, with carpentry work carried out by Torleiv and Johannes Grimsgård from Nesbyen. The nave is rectangular with a smaller choir that is surrounded by sacristies to the north and south. The church has a bell tower on the west end of the nave. The new church was consecrated on 9 June 1882 by the Bishop Carl Peter Parelius Essendrop. However, the church had not yet been painted inside, and for this reason the last service in the old stave church was held as late as 9 July 1882. After that, the stave church was closed and in the fall of 1882, it was torn down.

== Media gallery ==

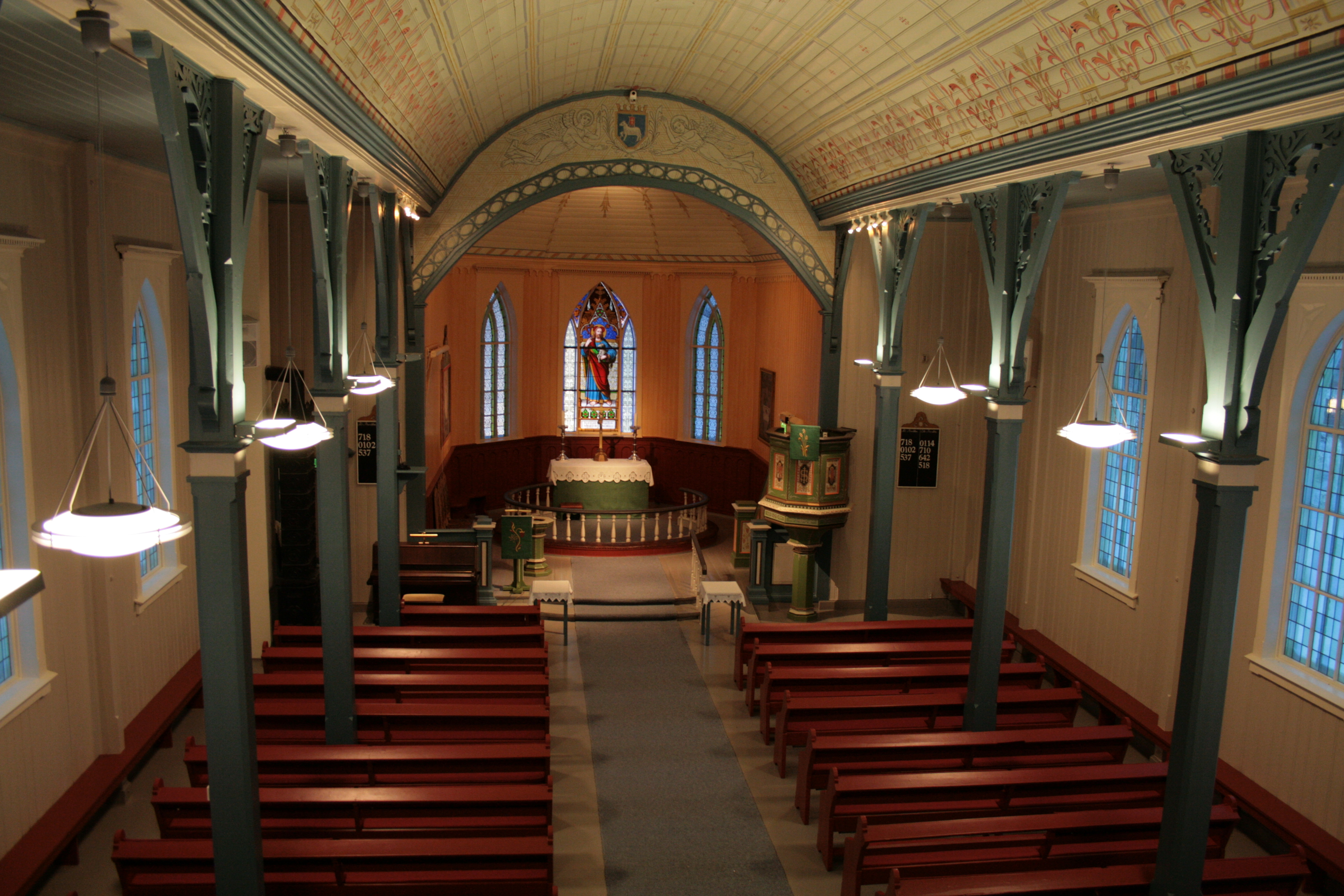

The old stave church

== See also ==
- List of churches in Tunsberg
