= Knut Hartvig Johannson =

Norwegian businessperson (born 1937)

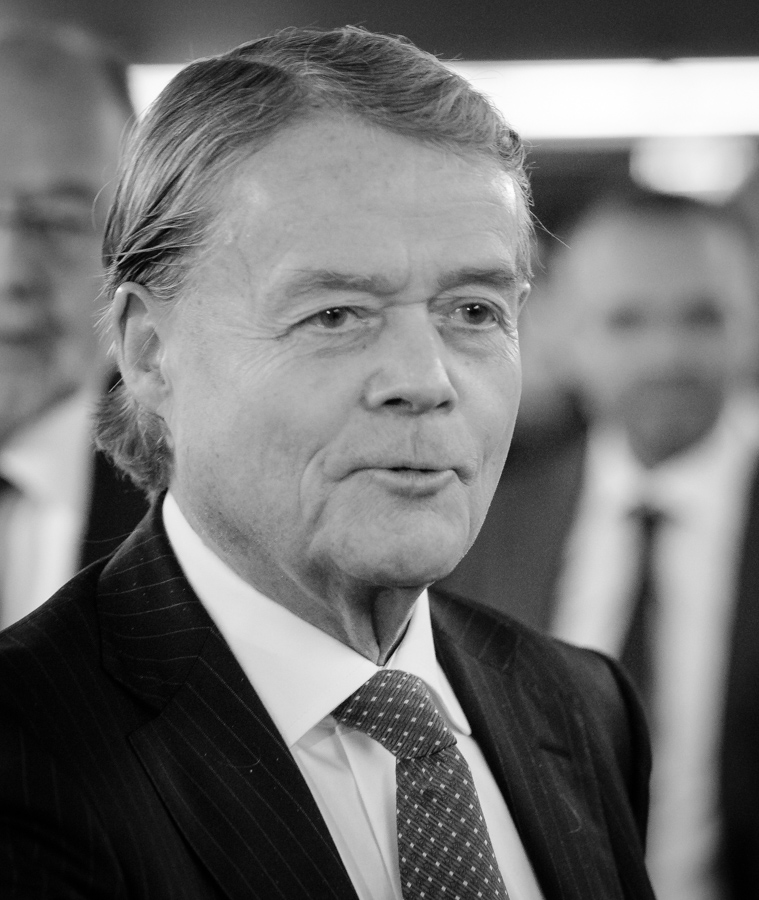
Knut Hartvig Johannson at Norges Bank

Knut Hartvig Johannson (born 1937) is a Norwegian businessperson.

He inherited the large wholesaler company Joh. Johannson, which was established in 1866, together with his brother Torbjørn. His son Johan Johannson was later brought in as owner. Today, Joh. Johannson is a part of the NorgesGruppen corporation, where Knut Hartvig Johannson is the chairman of the board.

He has a fortune of NOK 99 million, approximately 17.5 million U.S. dollars.
