= Vestre Spone Church =

Church in Buskerud, Norway

- Vestre Spone kirke
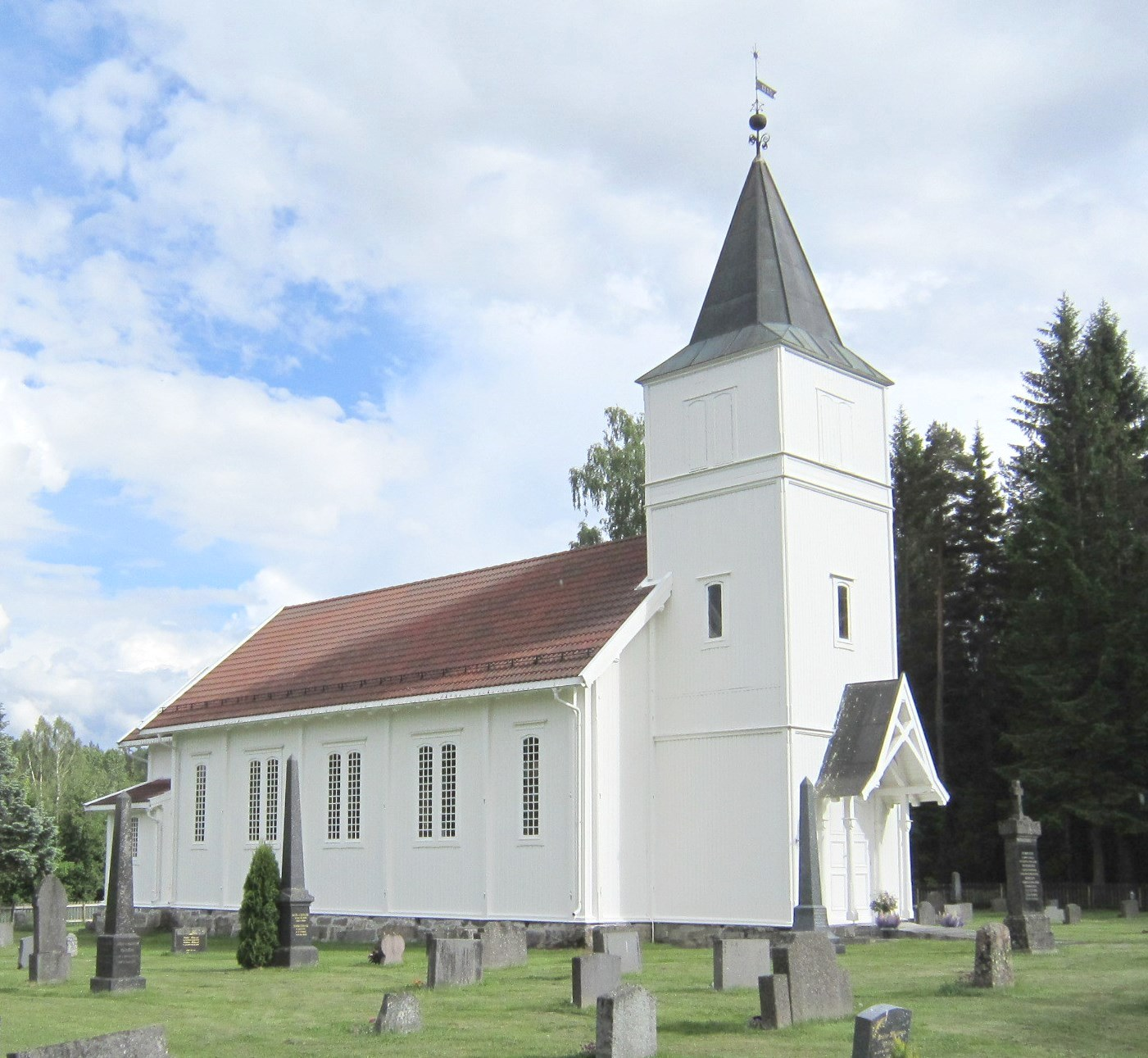
- View of the church
- Vestre Spone Church
- 59°57′09″N 9°54′18″E
- Location: Modum, Buskerud
- Country: Norway
- Denomination: Church of Norway
- Churchmanship: Evangelical Lutheran

History
- Status: Parish church
- Founded: 1880
- Consecrated: 21 Sept 1880

Architecture
- Functional status: Active
- Architect: Henrik Nissen
- Architectural type: Long church
- Completed: 1880 (146 years ago)

Specifications
- Capacity: 153
- Materials: Wood

Administration
- Diocese: Tunsberg
- Deanery: Eiker prosti
- Parish: Modum
- Norwegian Cultural Heritage Site
- Type: Church
- Status: Not protected
- ID: 85821

Vestre Spone Church (Norwegian: Vestre Spone kirke) is a parish church of the Church of Norway in Modum Municipality in Buskerud county, Norway. It is located in the village of Vestre Spone. It is one of the churches for the Modum parish which is part of the Eiker prosti (deanery) in the Diocese of Tunsberg. The white, wooden church was built in a long church design in 1880 using plans drawn up by the architect . The church seats about 153 people.

== History ==
During the 1870s, plans for two new chapels in Modum Municipality were put forth. Financing and architect's fees were quickly arranged for a new Ruud Chapel and Vestre Spone Chapel. Plans for both chapels were designed by Henrik Nissen. The new Vestre Spone Chapel was built in 1880 on land from the Amundrud farm and it was consecrated on 21 September 1880, but the Ruud Chapel was not built until 1917. Vestre Spone Chapel is a wooden long church. Most of the church is made of log construction, but the west tower is timber-framed. The nave is rectangular, and the choir is approximately square and surrounded by sacristies. The chapel was later re-titled as "Vestre Spone Church".

== Media gallery ==

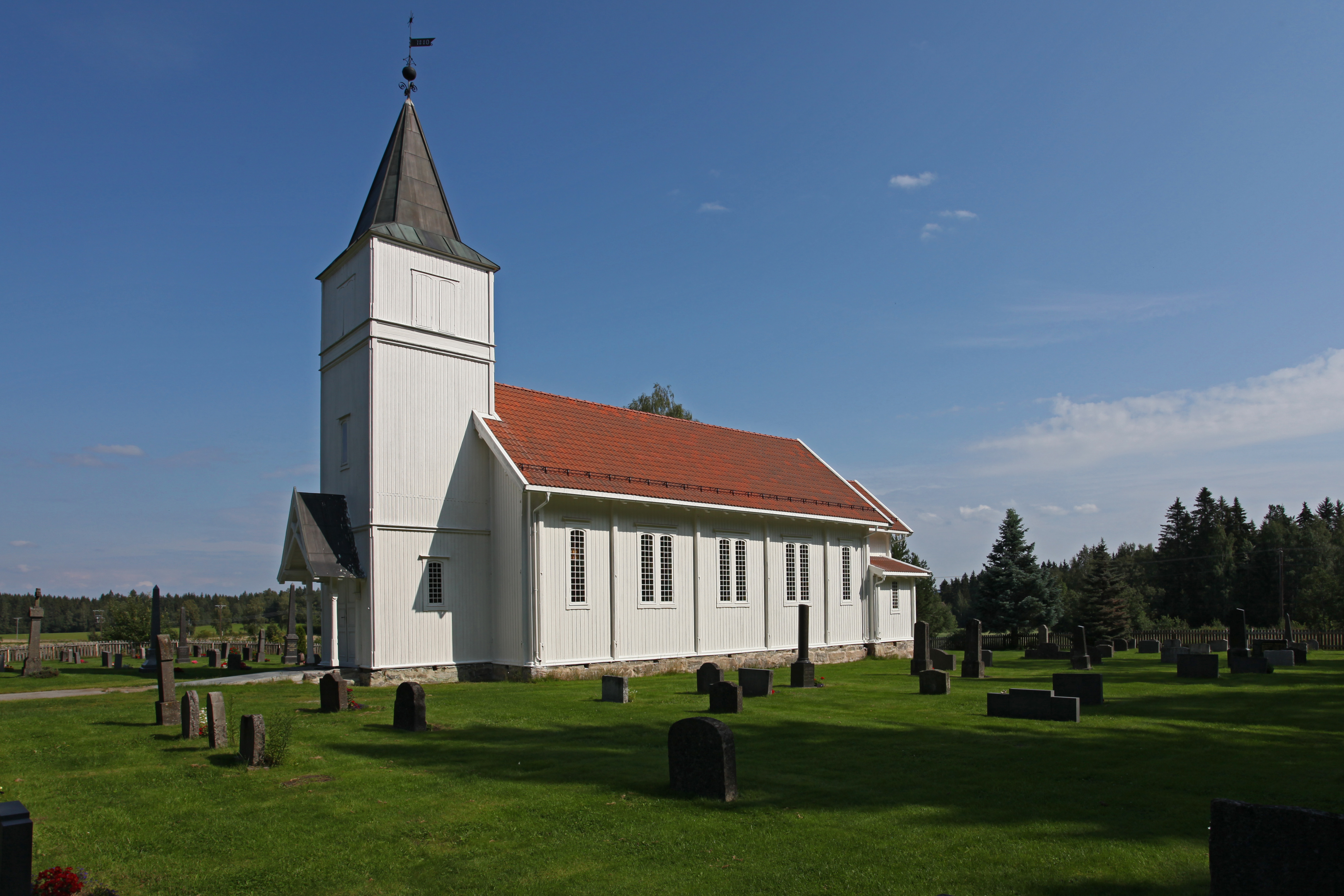

== See also ==
- List of churches in Tunsberg
