= Christine Spiten =

Norwegian engineer and entrepreneur (born 1990)

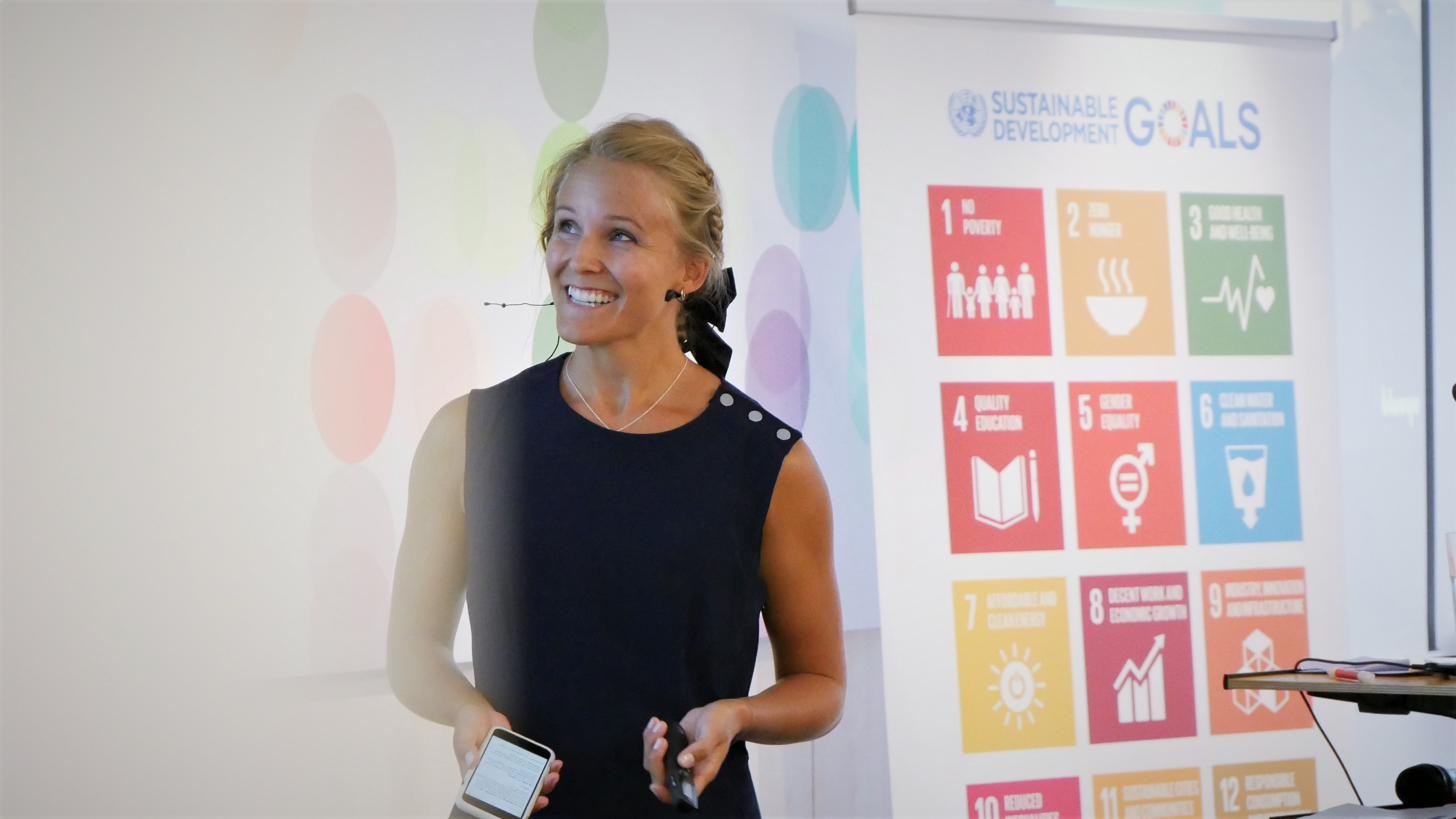
Spiten talking during an event

Christine Spiten (born March 20, 1990) is a Norwegian sailing champion, Engineer and co-founder of Blueye Robotics. She is also Co-Captain of EntrepreneurShip One.

== Education ==
Spiten earned a M.Sc. in Industrial Economics and Technology Management from the Norwegian University of Life Sciences.

She holds an underwater robotics degree from Federal University of Rio de Janeiro and studied International Entrepreneurship at University of California, Berkeley as part of the Gründerskolen programme.

== Career ==
In 2012, Spiten was interning at a company called Kongsberg when she first learned about underwater ROVs used in the IEM-project. Intrigued by the limited access to explore and experience the ocean, she moved to San Francisco to learn about entrepreneurship and underwater technology.

In 2015, Spiten co-founded an underwater drone company, Blueye Robotics, together with Erik Dyrkoren, Martin Ludvigsen and Erik Haugane.

In January 2019, Blueye Robotic had raised $10 million to date, and grown the team to 26 employees with offices in Trondheim and Oslo.

Spiten made a public TED-talk at the event TEDxTrondheim in 2018.

According to Forbes, her key connections are Anita Schjøll Brede, Erna Solberg, Odd Reitan, Johann Johannson and Arne Wilhelmsen.

== Awards and honors ==
- 2007: Norwegian Sailing Champion, Asker Seilforening
- 2017: Selected as Norway's 50 most important female tech founders.
- 2018:
  - Selected as Forbes "30 under 30"
  - Selected as World's Top 50 Women In Technology
  - Selected as top 10 of Norwegian Female Tech-Entrepreneurs
