= Hartvig Nissen =

Norwegian philologist and educator (1815–1874)

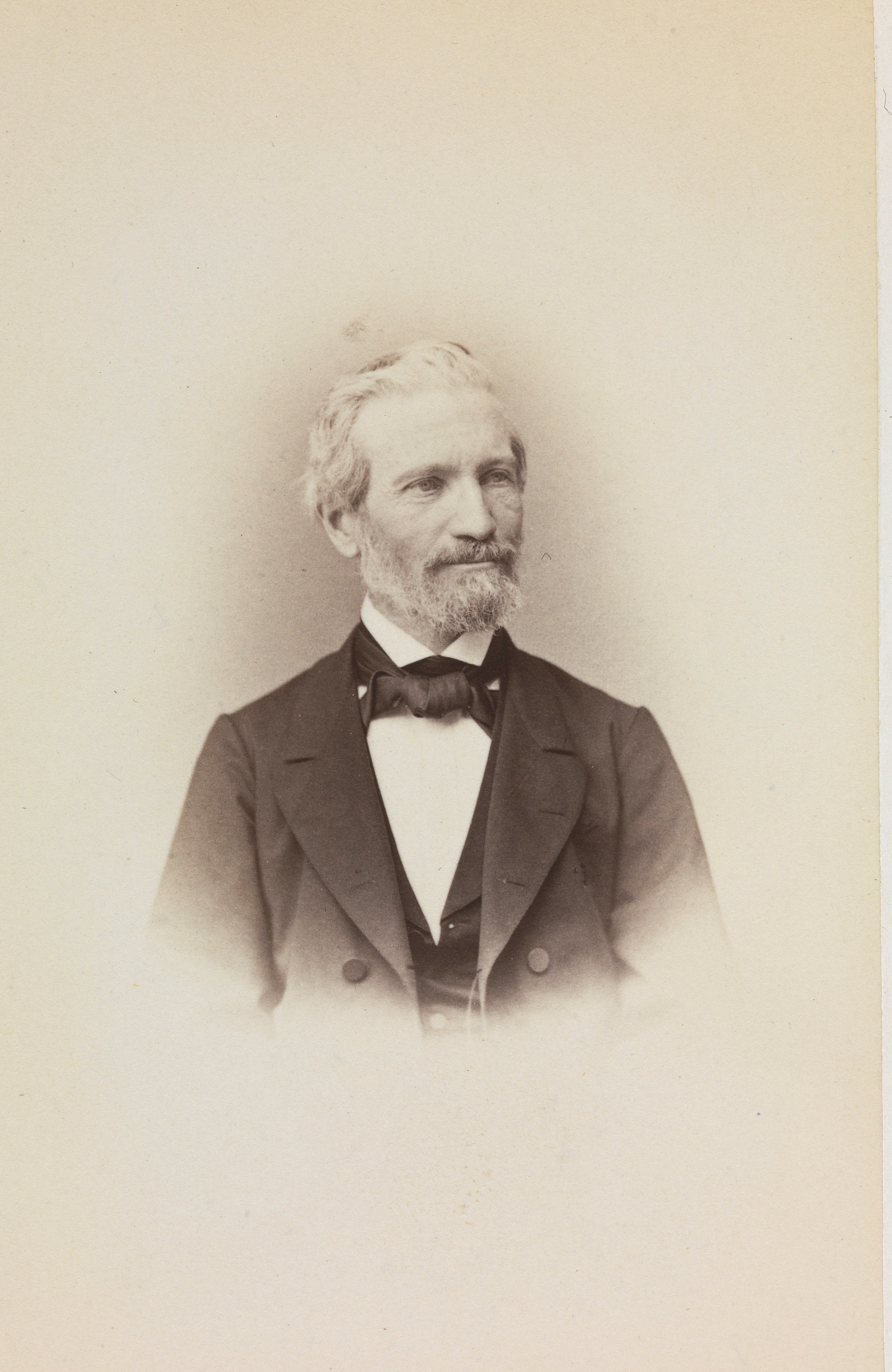
- Born: Ole Hartvig Nissen; 17 April 1815; Melhus Municipality, Norway
- Died: 4 February 1874 (aged 58)
- Occupations: philologist and educator
- Known for: founder of Hartvig Nissen School
- Children: Henrik Nissen

Ole Hartvig Nissen (17 April 1815 – 4 February 1874) was a Norwegian philologist and educator. He founded Nissen's Girls' School in Christiania in 1849. In 1865 he became director-general in the Ministry of Education, while remaining one of three joint headmasters of Nissen's Girls' School until 1872. In 1873 he was appointed to the prestigious position as rector of Oslo Cathedral School.

== Personal life ==
Hartvig Nissen was born in Melhus Municipality as a son of Lutheran priest, Peder Schjelderup Nissen (1775–1826) and Bolette Margrethe Musæus (1774–1859). He was a grandson of Martinus Nissen and first cousin of Rasmus Tønder Nissen. He was the 8th child in his family of 10 children. His great-grandfather Niels Hansen Nissen was born in Fredericia in Denmark and moved to Trondheim in Norway, where he became a merchant. "Nissen" is a patronymic surname meaning "son of Nis," Nis being a form of Niels used in Jutland.

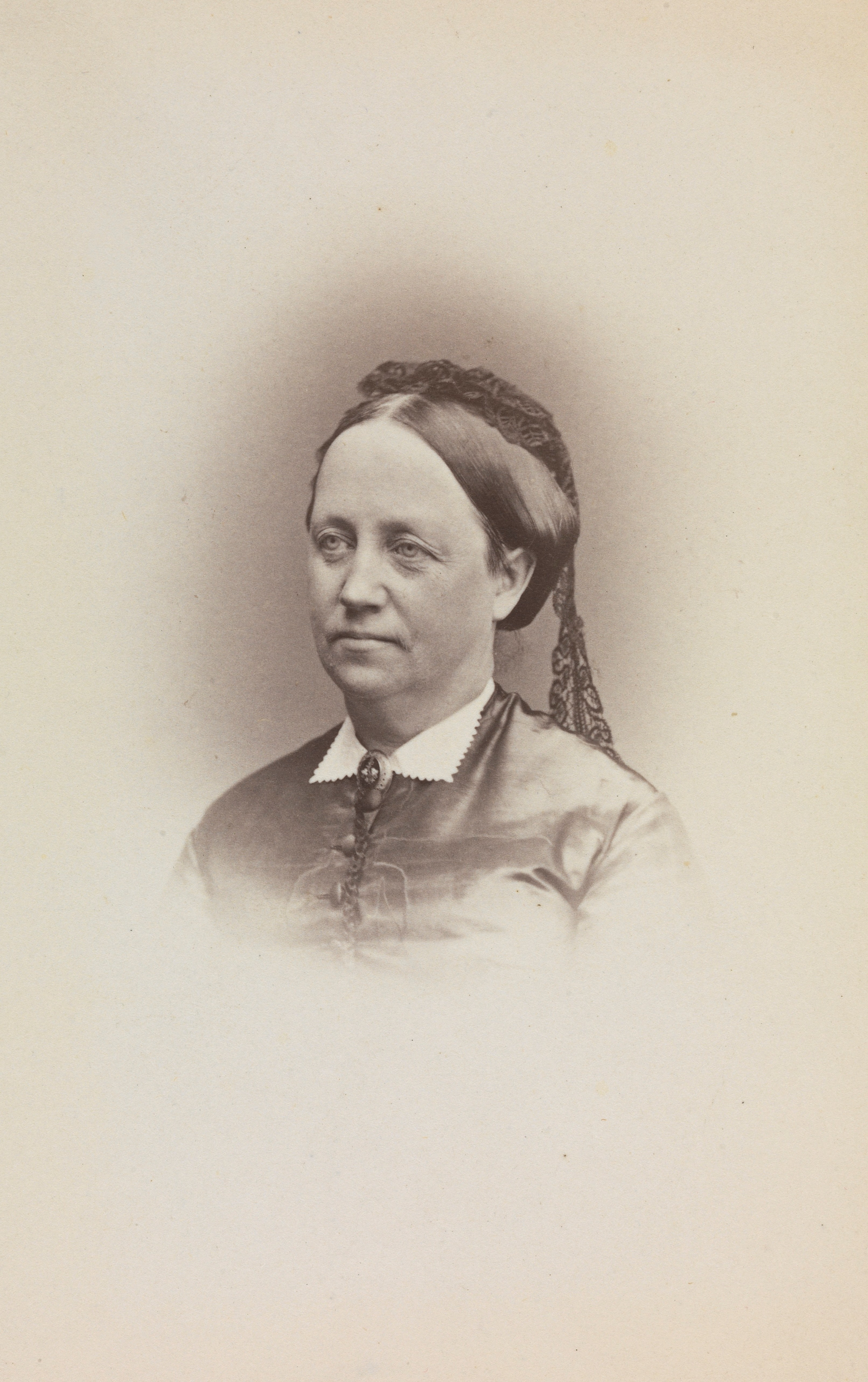
Karen Magdalena Nissen

In June 1843 in Christiania he married Karen Magdalena Aas (1820–1900), a granddaughter of Erik Andreas Colban. They were the parents of cartographer Per Schjelderup Nissen and architect Henrik Nissen. His daughter Helga Johanne Arentz Nissen married Johan Johannson and was the mother of Johan and Ole Hartvig Nissen Johannson.

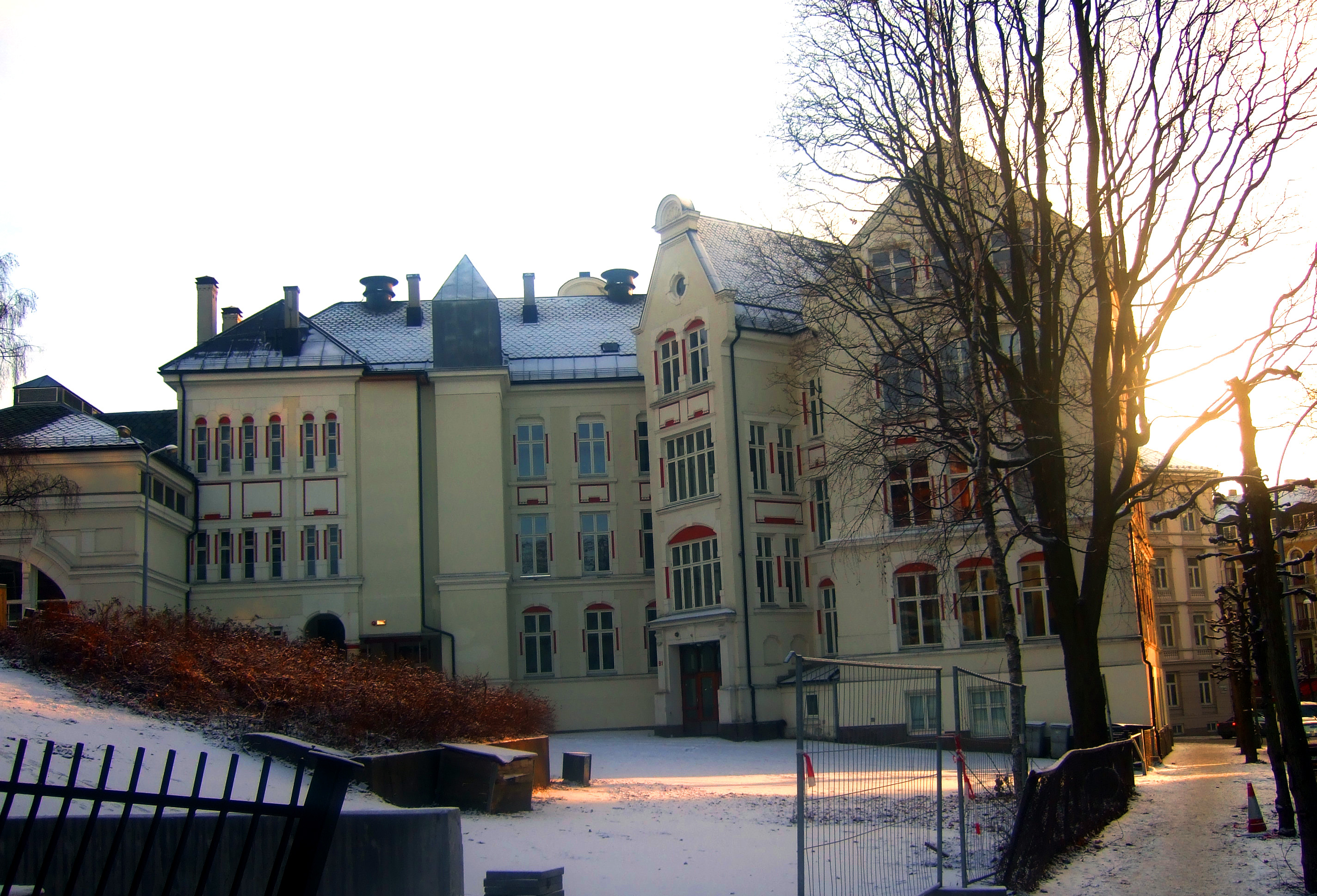
Hartvig Nissens Skole

Hartvig and Karen were also grandparents of prison director Hartvig Nissen and Kristian Nissen.

== Career ==
He had great influence on educational policy in Norway in the 19th century, being the architect behind several law reforms. In 1873 he became rector at the Oslo Cathedral School. He was a member of the Royal Norwegian Society of Sciences and Letters from 1852. He was elected deputy representative for the Parliament of Norway in 1857 and in 1859, and was appointed Knight of the Order of St. Olav in 1864.

== Selected works ==
- Om kvindelig Dannelse og kvindelige Undervisningsanstalter, (1849)
- Grundtræk af en Plan for Omdannelsen af Almueskolen paa Landet, (1851)
- Om Almueoplysningen og Almueskolen, (1852)
- Udkast til Love om Almueskolevæsenet paa Landet og i Kjøbstæderne med Begrundelse, (1856)
- Om Ordningen af vort høiere Skolevæsen, (1865)

== Other sources ==
- Boyesen, Einar with Therese Bertheau, Chr S. Mellbye, Henriette Nissen (1924) Nissens pikeskole 1849-1924 (Oslo: J.W. Cappelens Forlag)
- Boyesen, Einar (1947) Hartvig Nissen 1815–1874 og det norske skolevesens reform (Oslo: Johan Grundt Tanum)
- Slagstad, Rune (1998) De nasjonale strateger (Pax-bok) ISBN 978-82-530-2024-2
