= Johan Johannson (1881–1958) =

Norwegian businessman

Johan Johannson (6 August 1881 – 1958) was a Norwegian businessman.

== Personal life ==
He was born in Kristiania as a son of consul-general Johan Johannson and Helga Johanne Arentz Nissen (born 1855). He was a brother of Ole Hartvig Nissen Johannson. He was a maternal grandson of school founder Hartvig Nissen, and thereby a nephew of Per Schjelderup Nissen and Henrik Nissen; and second cousin of prison director Hartvig Nissen and Kristian Nissen.

In 1918 he married Lili Jacobsen, daughter of the district physician in Fredrikstad, Hans August Jacobsen.

== Career ==
He finished his secondary education in 1901, and took the cand.jur. in 1906. He was hired in the family company Joh. Johannson in 1908, and was a partner from 1917 to 1933. In 1933 he became manager of Oslo Havnelager, retiring in 1945. He was also a consul-general for the Kingdom of Romania from 1916 to 1918.

He was a chair of Den norske Creditbank, board member of the Det Søndenfjelds-Norske Dampskibsselskab from 1924, and was deputy chair of the supervisory council of Christiania Søforsikringsselskap from 1931. He chaired Colonialgrossistenes Landsforening from 1922 to 1925, Norges Grossistforbund from 1923 and Norges Kreditorforbund from 1931 to 1933. He was a board member of Oslo Port Authority from 1929, and deputy member of the Appeals Selection Committee of the Supreme Court of Norway.

He was decorated as an Officer of the Romanian Order of the Crown. He died in April 1958, following a long-term illness.
