= NorgesGruppen =

Norwegian grocery wholesaling group

NorgesGruppen ASA
- Type: Private ASA
- Industry: Grocery wholesale
- Founded: 1994
- Headquarters: Oslo, Norway
- Area served: Norway
- Key people: Runar Hollevik (CEO); Knut Hartvig Johannson (board chairman)
- Revenue: ▲NOK 102.7 billion €10.2 billion (2022)
- Number of employees: 28,000 (2018) (40 000 associated employees)
- Website: www.norgesgruppen.no

NorgesGruppen ASA is a Norwegian grocery wholesaling group which also runs various retail outlets. With a 43,2 % market share in 2018, NorgesGruppen was the largest player in the Norwegian grocery retail market. The business dates back to 1866 when the wholesale activity started up in the name of Joh. Johannson. NorgesGruppen is frequently accused of abusing its dominant market position in Norway to limit competition in the sector and has been fined by the Norwegian Competition Authority for these practices.

== Brands ==
NorgesGruppen owns various private labels, developed and managed by its subsidiary Unil AS. The private labels include:

- First Price
- Eldorado
- Jacobs utvalgte
- Fiskemannen
- Folkets
- Fersk & ferdig
- Unik
- Fauna
- Seidel
