= Havnelageret =

Commercial building in Oslo, Norway

Coordinates: 59°54′27.39″N 10°44′48.00″E

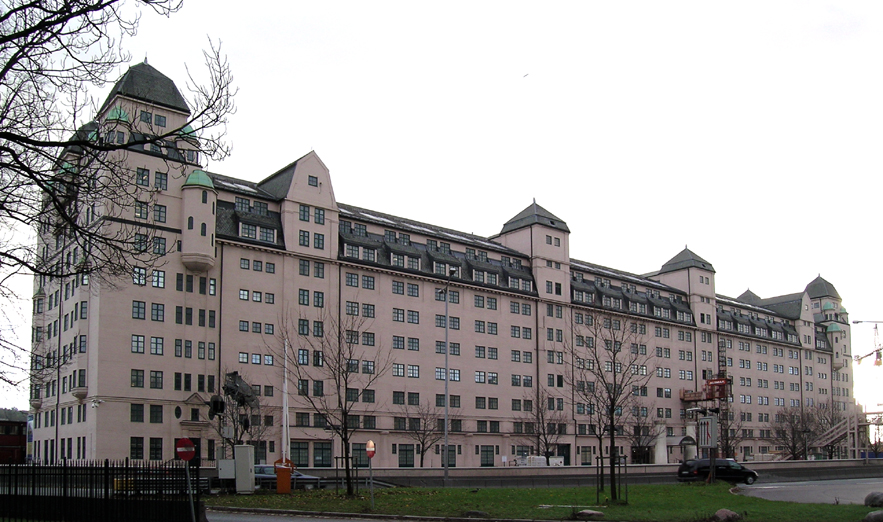
Havnelageret in November 2006.

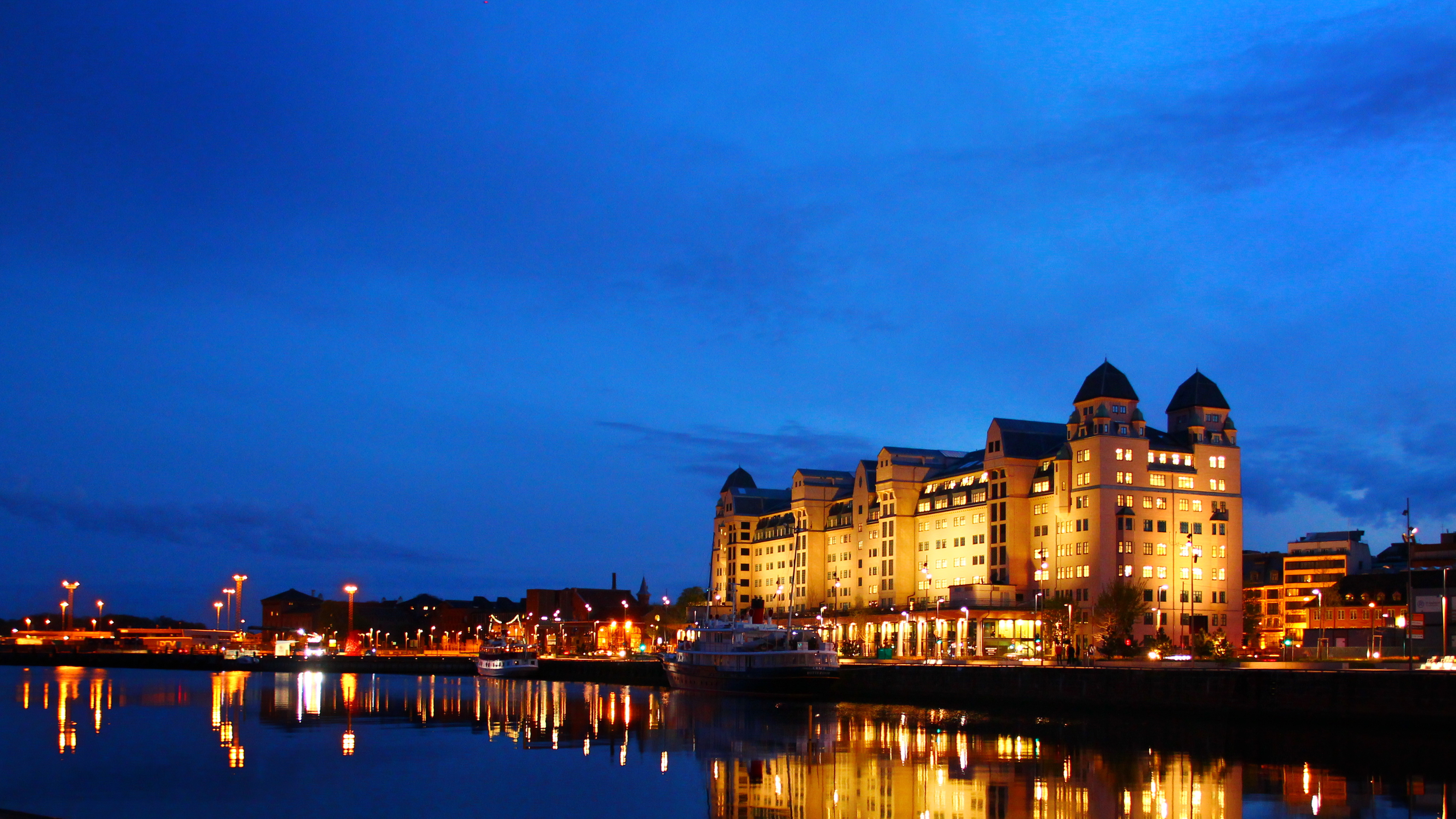
Havnelageret illuminated at night

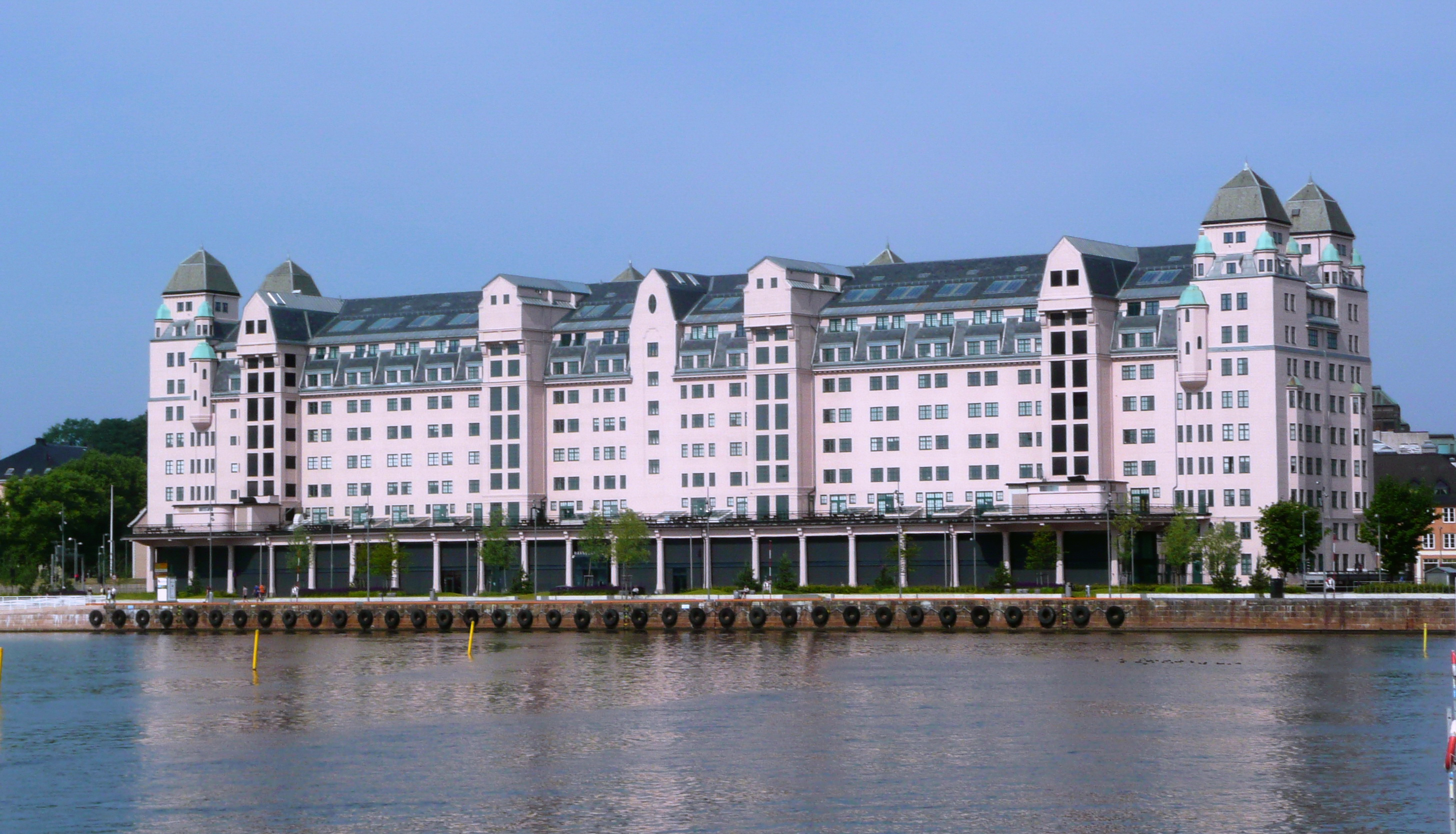
Havnelageret after the renovation

Havnelageret (also known as Oslo Havnelager), literal translation "The harbour warehouse", is a commercial building located at Langkaia 1 in Oslo, Norway. It houses Norwegian Defence Estates Agency as tenants.

== History ==
The building was erected in the period 1916-20 and designed by architect Bredo Henrik Berntsen. Havnelageret was one of the results of the huge development of ship transport during and after the First World War. The construction of the building was a challenge with the technology available at the time, and with rising prices and wages during the First World War all price estimations were surpassed. From the original amount of 3.2 million Norwegian kroner, the final cost ended up at 9.3 million kroner.

The construction of Havnelageret was complicated because the building had to be built on bedrock as a result of its large size. This bedrock lay 20 metres below ground level. The difficult base conditions delayed the construction process, but in 1920, Havnelageret was finally based on the 130 pillars, which laid on 1,550 piles in total. When finished, the building was so substantial that the 4th floor was used as an air-raid shelter during the Second World War.

The building has an outside surface of concrete. When Havnelageret was completed in 1921, it was the largest concrete building in Europe and the largest building in the Nordic countries. The building had 11 floors, a tower and an area of 39,708 m^{2} in its original form. The facade featured cranes, rises and towers. The style of the building has been categorized as Nordic Neo-Baroque with classical elements and details of Art Nouveau. In 1965 the building was awarded the Betongtavlen (an annual Norwegian prize for outstanding building architecture in concrete).

It took only 60 years for Havnelageret to be considered old. In the recent decades the harbour activity has decreased steadily. As a result, there has also been less demand for storage space, and current needs are mostly met outside the quay area itself. After a total renovation in 1983 carried out by the company Arkitektene as, the building nicknamed "Jacob's Dream" re-emerged as a pink-coloured office building filled by financiers, ship companies and oil companies. Because of its unusual colour, the building has also been called "The pink palace in Bjørvika". In late 2003, Entra Eiendom bought Langkaia 1 from Steen & Strøm ASA and had it thoroughly renovated in the following years.
