= Henrik Nissen =

Norwegian architect (1848–1915)

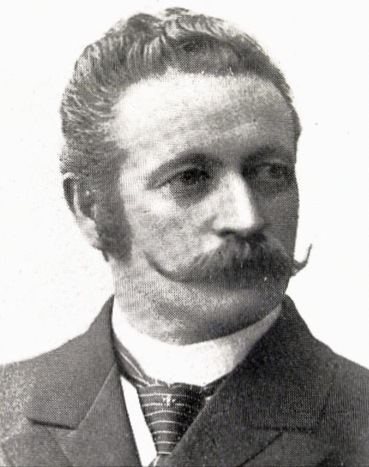
- Born: 21 April 1848; Christiania, Norway
- Died: 4 June 1915 (aged 67); Norway
- Occupation: Architect

Johannes Henrik Nissen ( 21 April 1848 – 4 June 1915) was a Norwegian architect.

== Personal life ==
He was born in Christiania as a son of school manager Hartvig Nissen (1815–1874) and Karen Magdalena Aas (1820–1900). He was a great-grandson of Martinus Nissen and Erik Andreas Colban, and brother of Per Schjelderup Nissen. Through his sister Helga Johanne Arentz Nissen he was a brother-in-law of Johan Johannson and uncle of Johan and Ole Hartvig Nissen Johannson.

In October 1875 in Berlin he married Hedwig Marie Pauline Bauer (1853–1929). Their son Henrik Nissen, Jr. (1888–1953) also worked as an architect. Henrik was also an uncle of prison director Hartvig Nissen and Kristian Nissen.

== Career ==
After his final exams in 1866, Nissen was a student at the Royal Drawing School in Christiania. He studied architecture at the Bauakademie in Berlin 1869–74. He was apprenticed to the architect firm Due & Steckmest in Christiania.

From 1875 he ran its own architectural office, from 1878 to 1882 in partnership with Holm Hansen Munthe. From 1886–1896, he had a close association with Henning Astrup (1864–1896). Henrik Nissen drew the upper secondary school which was established by his father, Hartvig Nissens skole, as well as many other buildings in Kristiania. In addition, his drawings were used for churches all over Norway. Henrik Nissen also had the opportunity to conduct a series of expensive buildings for wealthy clients. The details were influenced by both Swiss style and Gothic Revival architecture. He was a building manager in the city of Oslo from 1904 to 1906 and also had some own architectural practice.

He was chairman of the Norwegian Engineering and Architectural Society 1890 and 1895–96, and 1911–15. He was the first chairman of the Association of Norwegian Architects Association. He was also a juror in a wide range of important architectural competitions, and he was politically active in the Conservative Party in Kristiania and was a member of the municipal council for Kristiania Municipality from 1898–1901. Nissen was appointed Knight of the Order of St. Olav in 1884.

== Gallery ==
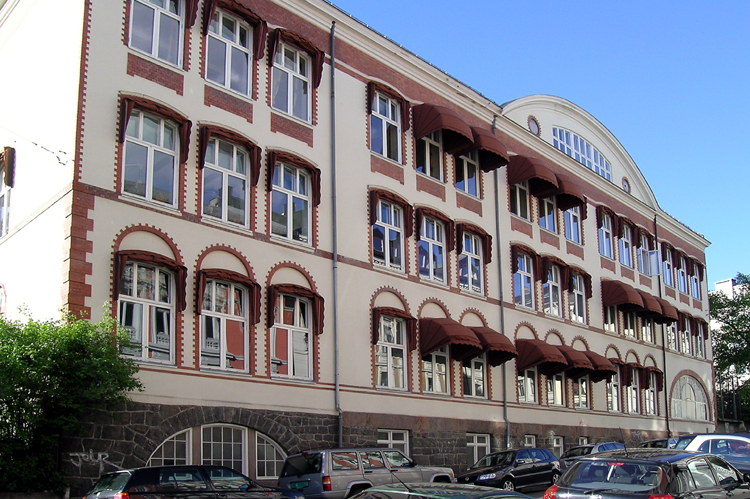
Hartvig Nissens skole, Oslo, Norway

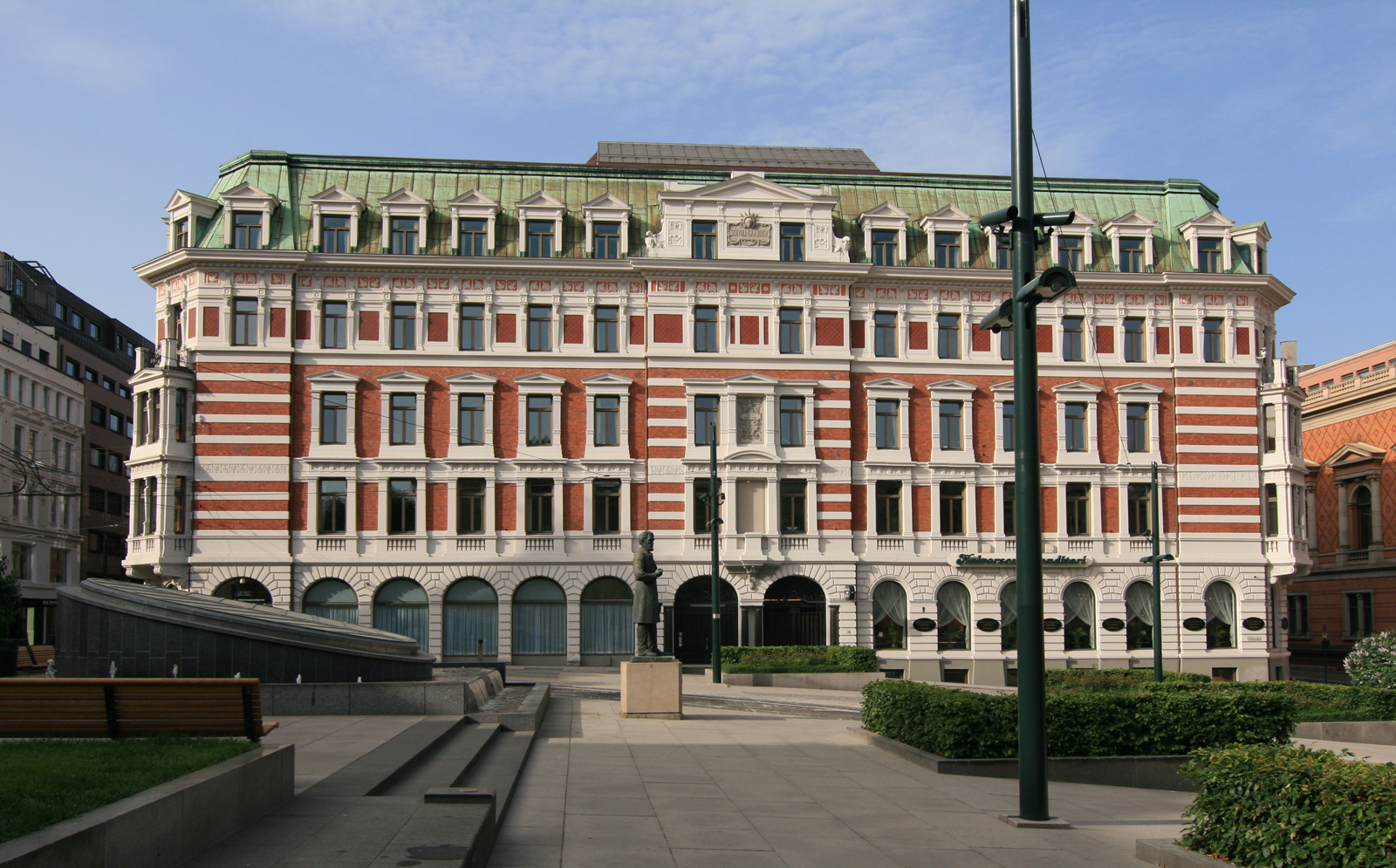
Prinsens gate 26, Oslo

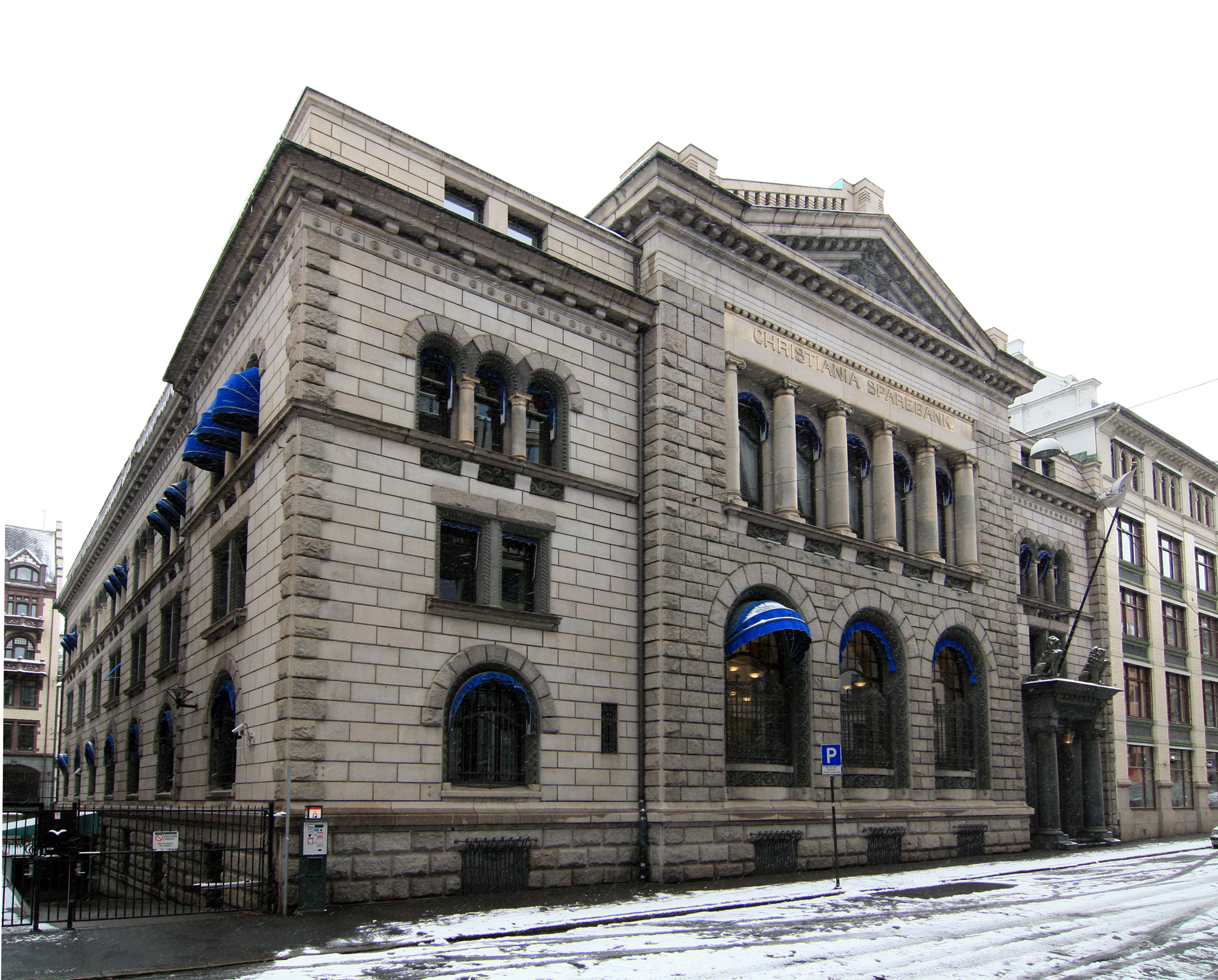
Christiania Sparebank, Øvre slottsgate 3, Oslo

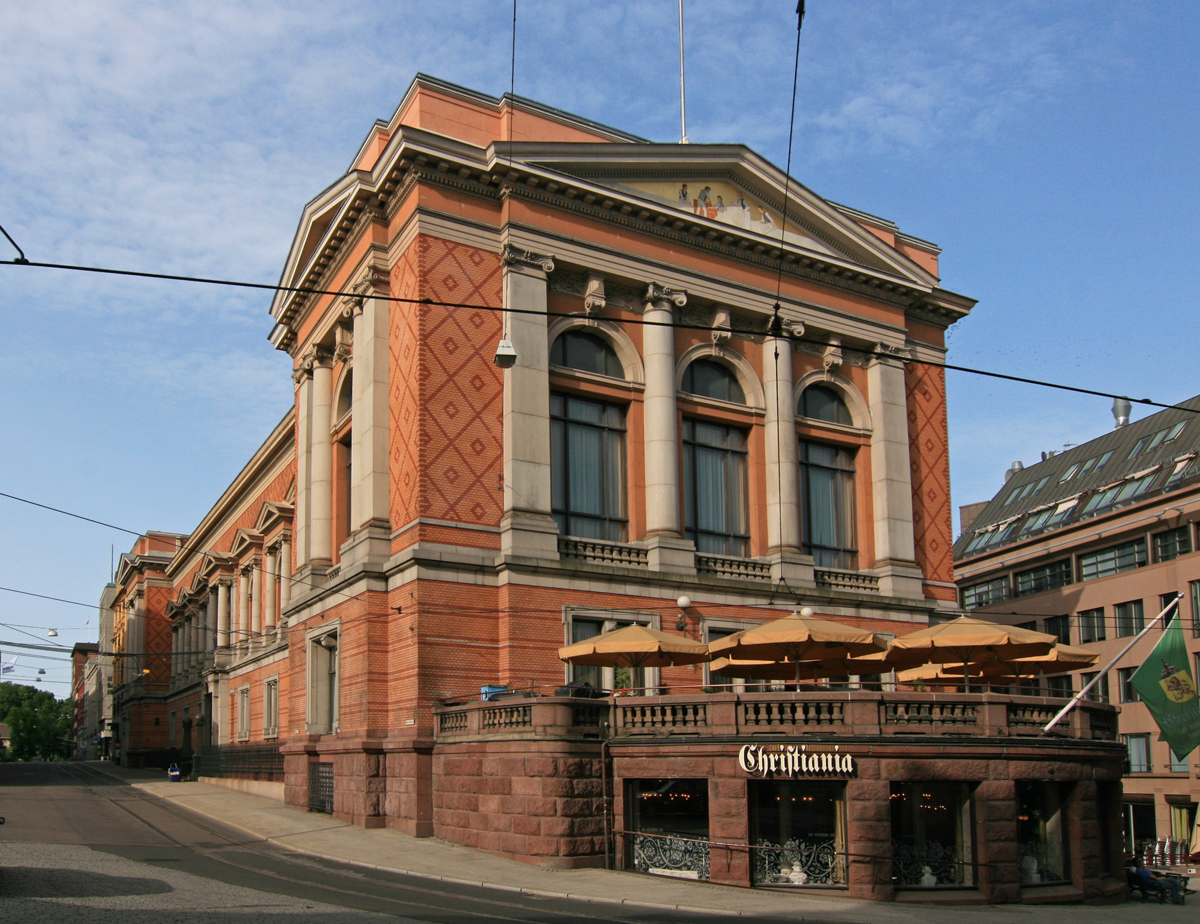
Masonic Lodge, Oslo

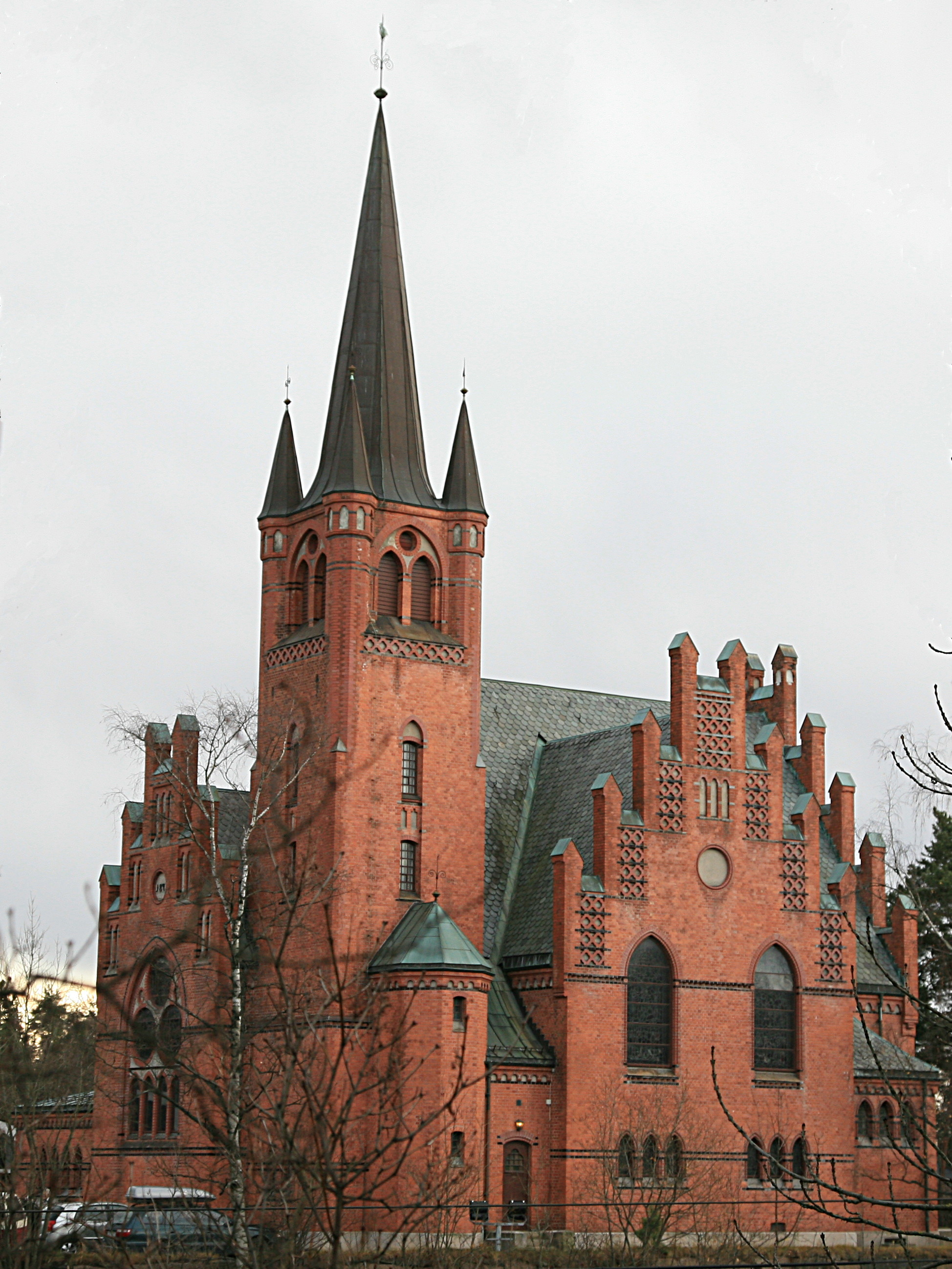
Høvik Church, Bærum Municipality

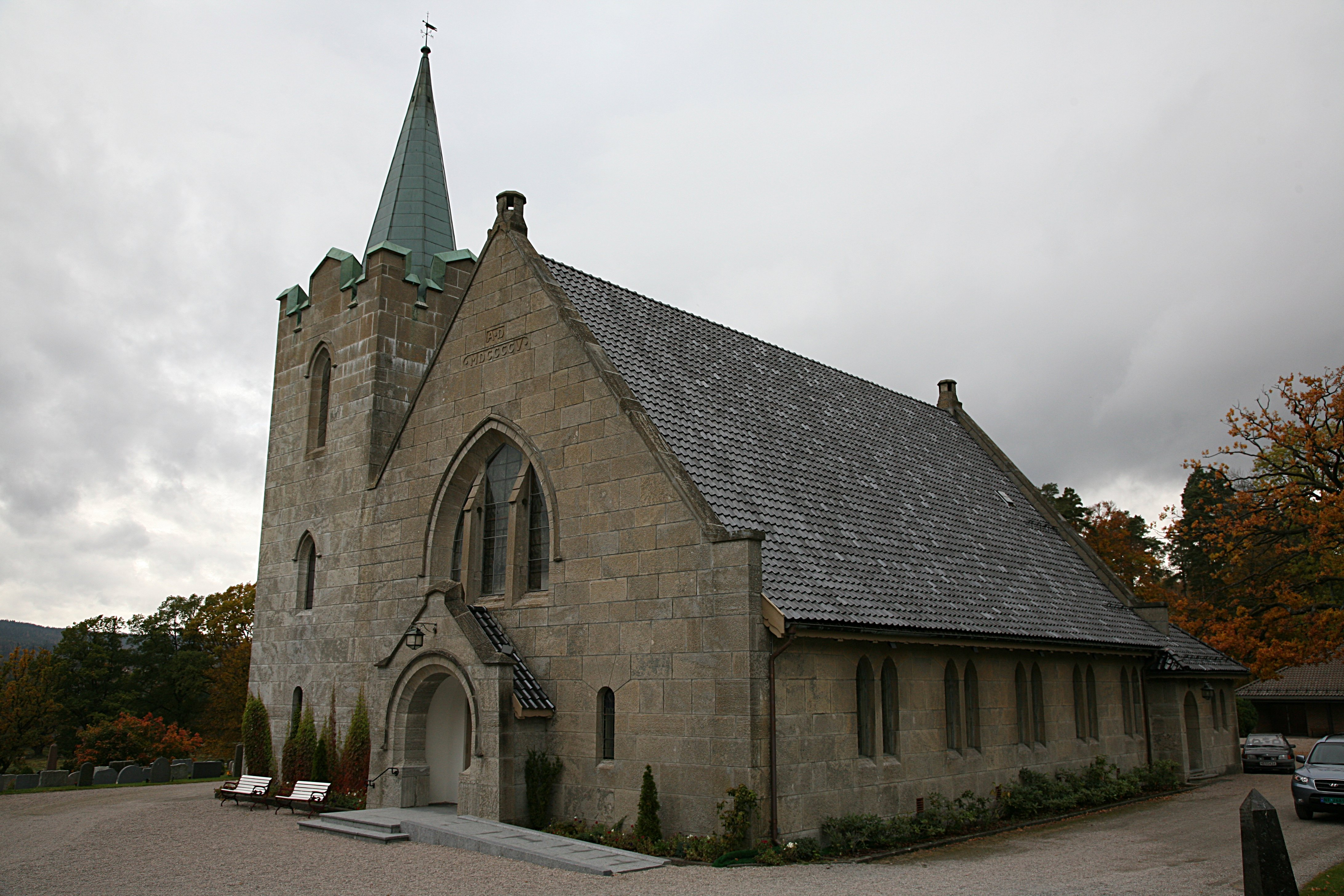
Borgestad Church, Skien Municipality

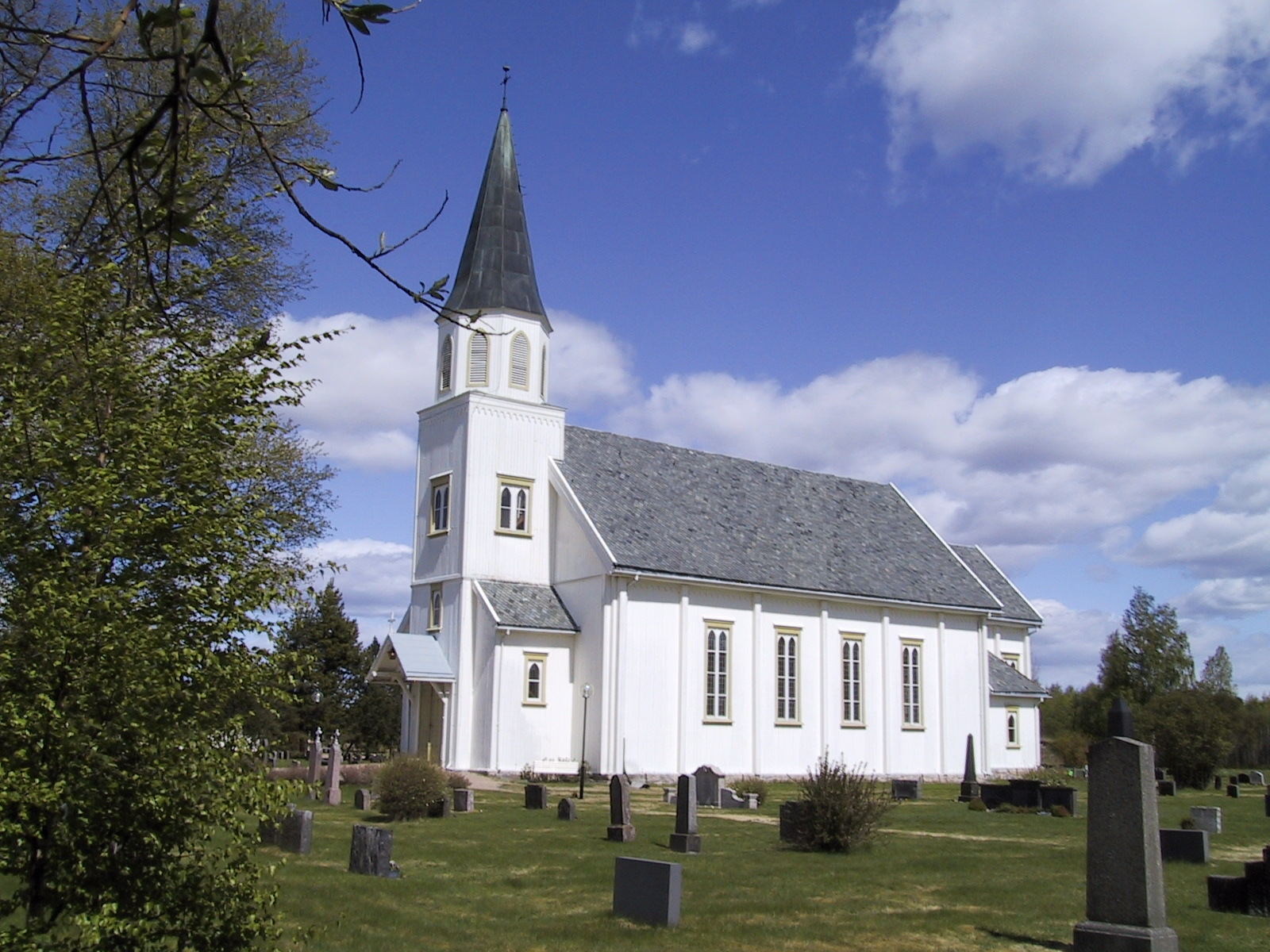
Arneberg Church, Åsnes Municipality

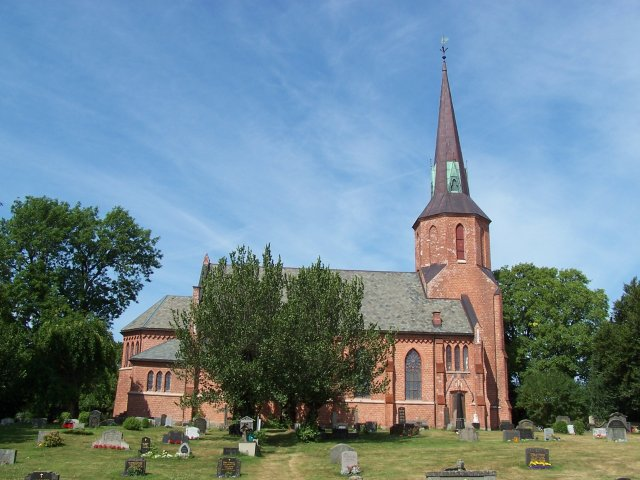
Vestby Church, Vestby Municipality (with Holm Hansen Munthe)

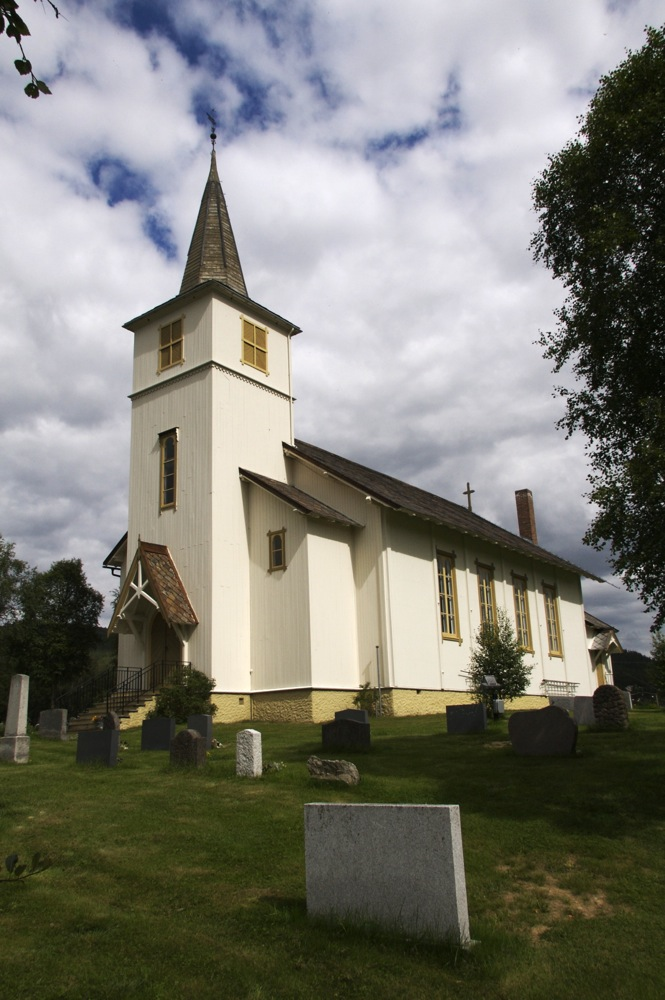
Folldal Church, Folldal Municipality

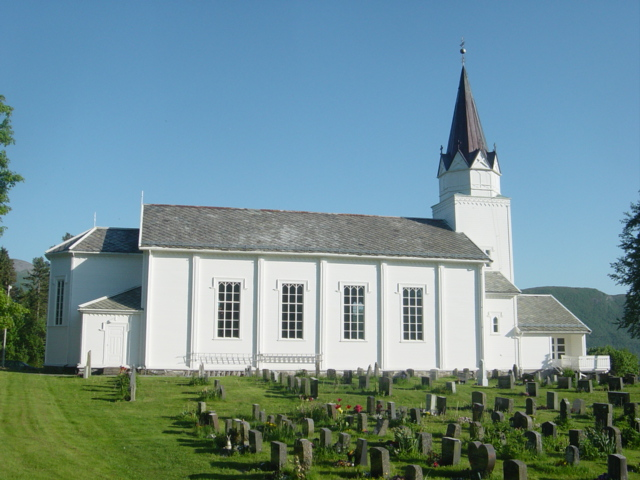
Myrbostad Church, Hustadvika Municipality

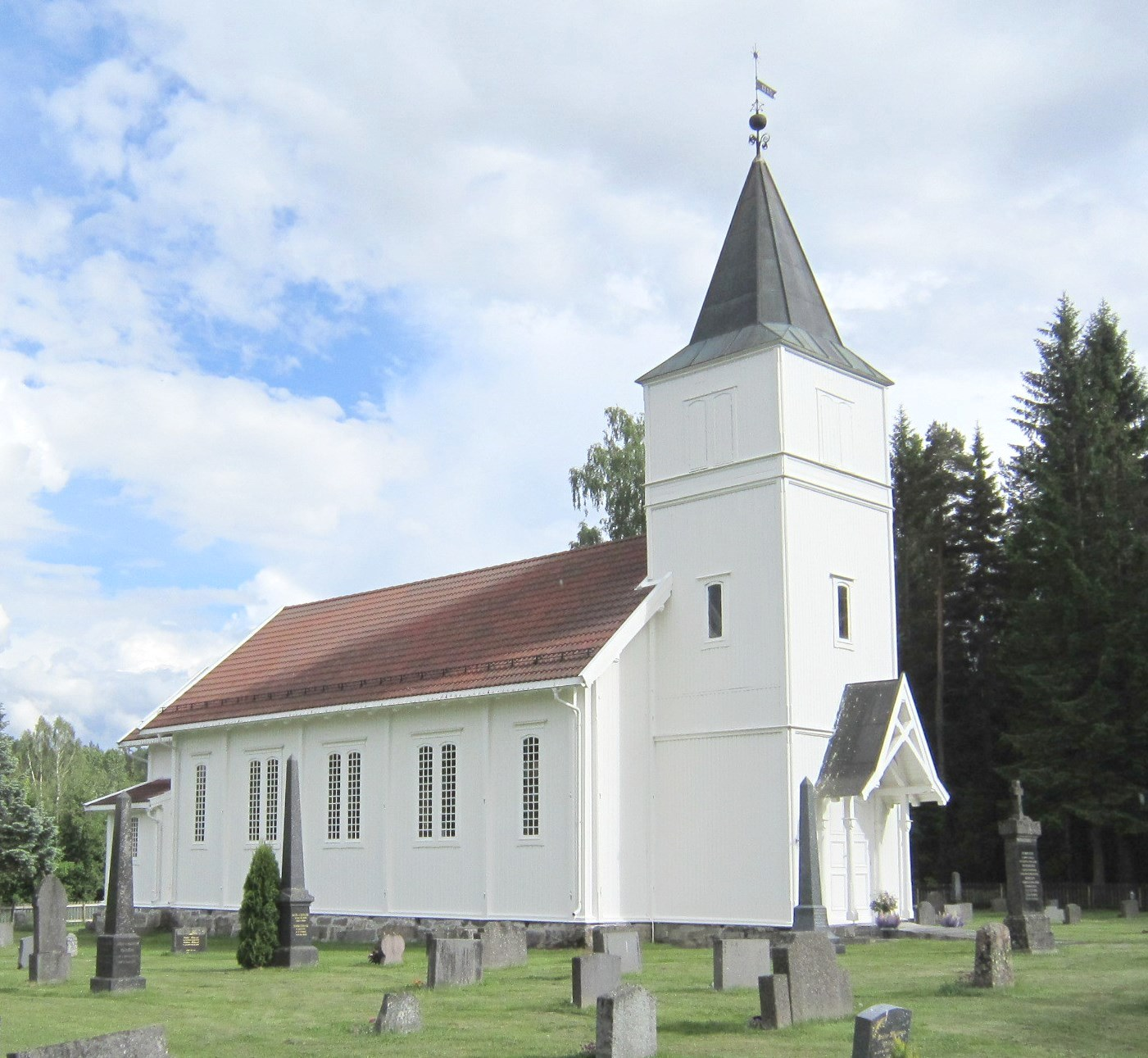
Vestre Spone Church, Modum Municipality
