= Joh. Johannson =

Wholesaling company in Norway

Logo used in the coffee business.

Joh. Johannson was a wholesaling company in Norway.

It was founded by Johan Johannson in 1866, and named after him. The company was mainly a wholesaler of groceries. It remained in the ownership of the Johannson lineage, and Joh. Johannson was incorporated into NorgesGruppen in 2000, the Johannson family became majority stockholders. A daughter company, Joh. Johannson Kaffe still exists, and imports coffee which it sells under brands such as Ali and Evergood.
