= Oftedal =

Oftedal is a surname. Notable people with the surname include:

- Lars Oftedal Broch (1939–2017), Norwegian judge
- Kari Oftedal Lima (1943–2019), Norwegian politician for the Socialist Left Party
- Christian S. Oftedal (1907–1955), Norwegian politician for the Liberal Party
- Hanna Bredal Oftedal (born 1994), Norwegian handball player
- Lars Oftedal (1877–1932), the Norwegian Minister of Social Affairs and Minister of Trade
- Lars Oftedal (born 1838) (1838–1900), Norwegian revivalist, priest, social reformer, politician, publicist and newspaper editor
- Magne Oftedal (1921–1985), Norwegian linguist who researched Scottish Gaelic dialects, the Celtic languages and Spanish
- Stine Bredal Oftedal (born 1991), Norwegian handball player
- Sven Oftedal (1844–1911), Norwegian American Lutheran minister
- Sven Oftedal (politician) (1905–1948), the Norwegian Minister of Social Affairs in 1945 and 1945–1948
- Tor Oftedal (1925–1980), Norwegian politician for the Labour Party
- Alfred Oftedal Telhaug (1934–2016), Norwegian educationalist

== See also ==
- Oftel
- Soft pedal
