= Harald Sverdrup (writer) =

Norwegian writer (1923–1992)

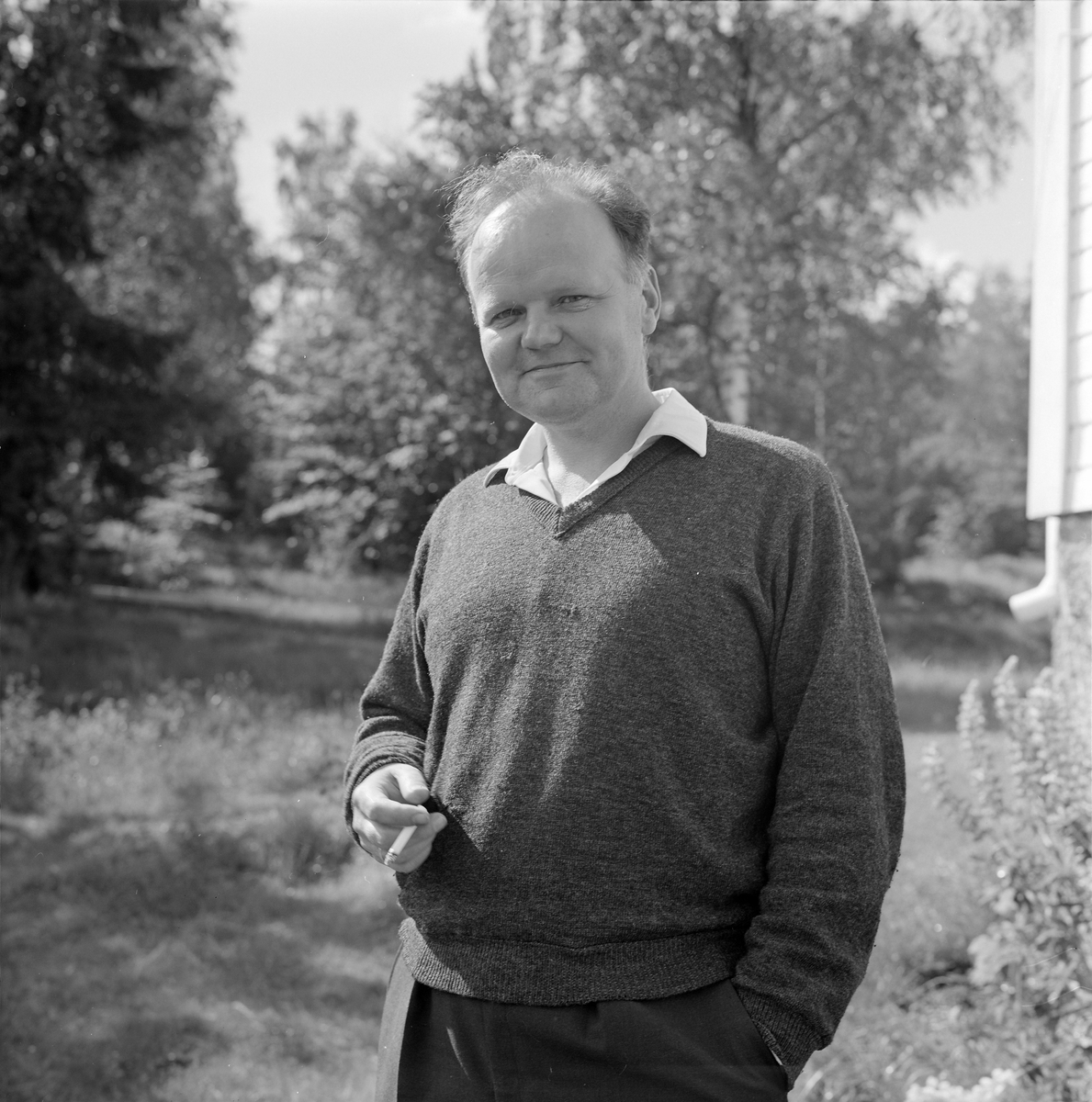
- Sverdrup in 1967
- Born: Harald Ulrik Sverdrup; 29 May 1923; Buksnes, Lofoten, Norway
- Died: 26 June 1992 (aged 69); Tønsberg, Norway
- Writing career
- Notable awards: Norwegian Critics Prize for Literature; Mads Wiel Nygaards Endowment; Dobloug Prize; Riksmål Society Literature Prize

Harald Ulrik Sverdrup (29 May 1923 – 26 June 1992) was a Norwegian poet and children's writer. He received several literary prizes, including the Norwegian Critics Prize for Literature, the Mads Wiel Nygaards Endowment, the Dobloug Prize and the Riksmål Society Literature Prize.

== Early and personal life ==
Sverdrup was born in Gravdal in Buksnes Municipality (Lofoten), as a son of medical doctor Harald Ulrik Sverdrup (1890–1976) and Berit Johanne Strandenæs (1896–1961). He was related to bishop and politician Jakob Sverdrup, who was his great-uncle, and to oceanographer Harald Ulrik Sverdrup Jr, who was his first cousin once removed. Other first cousins once removed are Leif Sverdrup, Georg Johan Sverdrup and philologist Jakob Sverdrup. He was also a great-grandson of Harald Ulrik Sverdrup Sr, a grandnephew of Jakob Sverdrup, Georg Sverdrup and Edvard Sverdrup, and a second cousin of historian Jakob Sverdrup.

He spent his early childhood in Lofoten, Risør, Hvitsten, and Rjukan, and later in Oslo. During World War II he participated in resistance work in Norway, until he fled to Sweden and Great Britain in 1944. He joined as ground crew at the Norwegian Spitfire Wing, and participated at the war front in Belgium, Holland and Germany.

He was married to Jorunn Elset from 1950 to 1954, and to his first cousin Mari Ulstrup from 1954. The couple lived at Kalbakken and Stokke.

== Literary career ==
Sverdrup made his literary debut in 1948 with the poetry collection Drøm og drift. His literary breakthrough came with the collection Sankt Elms ild from 1958, which earned him the Norwegian Critics Prize for Literature. He issued the collection of children's poetry Snurrebassen og andre tøysevers in 1958. He received the Mads Wiel Nygaards Endowment in 1959. During the 1960s he issued the poetry collections Isbjørnfantasi (1961), Sang til solen (1964) and Farlig vind (1969), and the prose books Negeren og solsikken (1965) and Paradisets barn (1968). In the 1970s he issued the poetry collections Fredløse ord (1971) and Grønn kalender (1974). He received the Dobloug Prize in 1978, and the Riksmål Society Literature Prize in 1985.
