= Sverdrup (disambiguation) =

Sverdrup is a unit of volume flux.

Sverdrup may also refer to:

== Surname ==
- Einar Sverdrup (1895–1942), a Norwegian mining engineer and businessman
- Erling Sverdrup (1917–1994), Norwegian statistician
- Georg Sverdrup (1770–1850), founder of the first Norwegian university library
- Georg Sverdrup (1848–1907), President of Augsburg Seminary
- George Sverdrup, son of Georg, also president of Augsburg Seminary from 1911 to 1937
- George Sverdrup, technology manager of the National Renewable Energy Laboratory
- Harald Ulrik Sverdrup (politician) (1813–1891), Norwegian priest and politician
- Harald Sverdrup (oceanographer) (1888–1957), Norwegian oceanographer grandson of the previous one
- Harald Sverdrup (writer) (1923–1992), Norwegian writer and poet
- Johan Sverdrup (1816–1892), prime minister of Norway
- Leif J. Sverdrup (1898–1976), a Norwegian-American civil engineer
- Otto Neumann Sverdrup (1854–1930), Norwegian explorer
- Tone Sverdrup (born 1951), Norwegian jurist

== Places ==
- Sverdrup Pass, a pass on Ellesmere Island, Nunavut, Canada
- Sverdrup Islands, Arctic islands
- Sverdrup Island (Kara Sea), another Arctic island
- Sverdrup (crater), a lunar crater near the Moon's south pole
- Sverdrup Township, Minnesota
- Johan Sverdrup oil field, often abbreviated as Sverdrup

== Other uses ==
- Sverdrup balance, an oceanographic theory
