= Jakob Sverdrup =

Jakob Sverdrup may refer to:

- Jakob Sverdrup (politician) (1845–1899), Norwegian bishop and politician
- Jakob Sverdrup (philologist) (1881–1938), Norwegian philologist
- Jakob Sverdrup (historian) (1919–1997), Norwegian historian
