= Jakob Sverdrup (historian) =

Norwegian historian

Jakob Sverdrup (30 November 1919 – 5 December 1997) was a Norwegian historian.

== Personal life ==
He was born in Bergen as a son of the professor of religious studies Georg Johan Sverdrup (1885–1951). He was a nephew of philologist Jakob Sverdrup, a first cousin once removed of Harald Ulrik Sverdrup and Leif Sverdrup, a grandson of bishop and politician Jakob Sverdrup, a great-grandson of Harald Ulrik Sverdrup, Sr, a grandnephew of Georg Sverdrup and Edvard Sverdrup and a second cousin of Harald Sverdrup.

== Career ==
He started his career as a journalist, and became the editor of foreign news in Arbeiderbladet. He took the dr.philos. degree in 1974 with the thesis Et statsmonopol blir til—Vinmonopolet frem til 1932. He worked as a lecturer at the University of Oslo from 1963 and as assisting professor from 1983. From 1978 to 1989 he was the director of the Norwegian Nobel Institute, doubling as secretary of the Norwegian Nobel Committee.
