= Per Thomsen =

Norwegian journalist and newspaper editor

- Born: 17 August 1905; Bergen, Norway
- Died: 22 October 1983 (aged 78); Stavanger
- Occupations: Journalist, newspaper editor
- Employer: Stavanger Aftenblad
- Relatives: Christian S. Oftedal (brother-in-law)

Per Berle Thomsen (17 August 1905 – 22 October 1983) was a Norwegian journalist and newspaper editor. He spent his entire journalistic career with the newspaper Stavanger Aftenblad, and was chief editor from 1955 to 1973.

== Personal life ==
Born in Bergen on 17 August 1905, Thomsen was a son of merchant Wilhelm Olai Thomsen and Karen Berntsen. He married journalist Ruth Øverland in 1936. He was a brother-in-law of newspaper editor and politician Christian S. Oftedal, who was married to his younger sister Anne Louise.

== Career ==
Thomsen was a journalist for Stavanger Aftenblad from 1926 to 1941. In the 1930s he wrote a series of humorous books about his mountain hiking experiences, the first was På Tomannsfot (1932). Similar books are Med kikkert på magen (1933), Tomannsbu (1934), and Hypp, all mine hester (1935). He also issued a free translation of J.A. Lees' and W.J. Clutterbuck's travelogue Three in Norway (by two of them) into Norwegian language. In 1942 he published the children's book Tunnelen.

From November 1944 to May 1945 he was incarcerated in the Grini concentration camp. He was acting chief editor from 1945 to 1949, news editor from 1949 to 1955, and then editor-in-chief for Stavanger Aftenblad from 1955 to 1973. He regularly wrote humorous columns in the newspaper, often signed with the pseudonym Charivari.

Taking part in organizational work, Thomsen chaired Stavanger Presseforening, was a board member of the Norwegian Press Association for twenty years, and a jury member for the Narvesen Prize. He also chaired Stavanger Turistforening, later a subsidiary of the Norwegian Trekking Association, and contributed to the annual yearbooks of the association, by writing articles, and as a member of the editorial committee.

He was decorated Knight, First Class of the Order of St. Olav in 1973.

Thomsen died in Stavanger on 22 October 1983, at the age of 78.

== Selected works ==
- På Tomannsfot (1932)
- Med kikkert på magen (1933)
- Tomannsbu (1934)
- Hypp, all mine hester (1935)
