= Folkebladet =

Norwegian American newspaper

Folkebladet was a Norwegian American newspaper published in Minneapolis, Minnesota, at Augsburg Seminary (now Augsburg University) from 1877 to 1952. Georg Sverdrup was the paper's creator and first editor. It identified itself as the "organ of the Lutheran Free Church" and focused on church activities in Minnesota, Iowa, North Dakota, South Dakota, Wisconsin, and other states.

Folkebladet is available online through a digitization effort supported by Lindell Library at Augsburg University.
