= Lars Oftedal (born 1838) =

Norwegian politician (1838–1900)

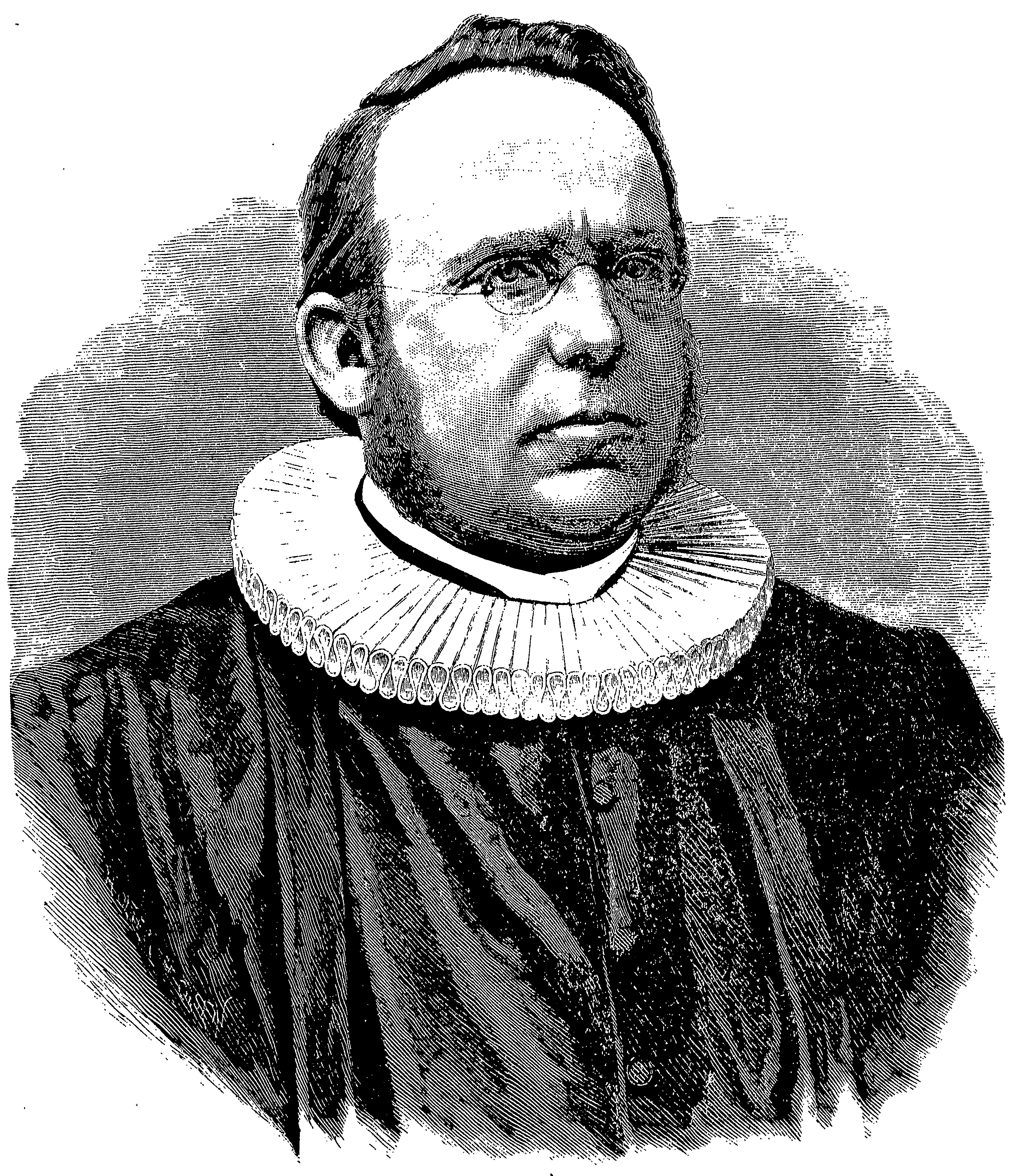
- Lars Oftedal drawn by Hans Christian Olsen
- Born: 27 December 1838; Stavanger, Norway
- Died: 2 May 1900 (aged 61); Stavanger
- Occupations: revivalist, priest, social reformer, politician, publicist and newspaper editor
- Known for: Founder of social institutions Editor of Vestlandsposten; Founding editor of Stavanger Aftenblad; Member of the Storting
- Notable work: Basunrøst og Harpetoner (1870)
- Children: Lars Oftedal
- Relatives: Sven Oftedal (brother); Christian Oftedal (grandson); Sven Oftedal (grandson)
- Awards: Order of St. Olav

Lars Svendsen Oftedal (27 December 1838 – 2 May 1900) was a Norwegian priest, social reformer, politician, and newspaper editor. He was the founding editor of Stavanger Aftenblad and served as a member of the Storting.

== Background ==
He was born in Stavanger as the son of teacher Svend Oftedahl (1812–83) and Gunhild Ommundsdatter Stokke (1809–81). His father was a teacher at Stavanger Cathedral School. His younger brother Sven Oftedal (1844–1911) was a Norwegian American Lutheran minister who served as the 3rd president of Augsburg University and helped found the Lutheran Free Church. Oftedal passed his examen artium in 1859 and entered Royal Frederick University in Christiania where he studied theology under Gisle Johnson (1822–1894). Oftedal graduated cand.theol. in 1864 and took theological exam in 1865.

== Career ==
His first working position was as a traveling revivalist for Bergens Indremisjon. He was a seamen's priest in Cardiff from 1866 to 1868. From 1869 he worked for the home mission of the Arendal district. His collection of psalms, Basunrøst og Harpetoner from 1870 was met with great popularity and was printed in 200,000 copies over the years. In 1870 he was appointed priest in Kristiansands stift. From 1874 he was a priest in Hetland Municipality outside Stavanger. His own chapel Bethania in Stavanger opened in January 1875. He was a vicar in Stavanger from 1885 to 1891.

Oftedal founded several social institutions in Stavanger, including an orphanage for boys in 1877, and a home for women (the Magdalena institution). He bought the Storhaug farm Berge, renamed Emmaus, which was included in the group of institutions. He acquired the island Lindøy, where he established an institution for the most difficult boys. The fundings for his charity work came from volunteer work, including large lotteries ("bazaar") in Bethania. The first Waisenhus bazaar was arranged in 1876, and became a tradition which lasted more than hundred years, until the 1980s.

Oftedal edited the newspaper Vestlandsposten from 1878 to 1891. In 1893 he founded and edited the newspaper Stavanger Aftenblad. After Oftedal's death in 1900, his son Lars Oftedal took over as editor until his own death in 1932. He was followed by his son Christian Stephansen Oftedal who operated the newspaper until he died in 1955.

== Politician ==
Oftedal was a deputy representative from Stavanger to the Parliament from 1877 to 1879. He was elected to the Stavanger City Council from 1881. He was elected to the Parliament of Norway from 1883 to 1885, representing the Liberal Party, and from 1889 to 1891, when he represented the Moderate Liberal Party. In 1891 he was elected for the period 1892 to 1894, but did not meet due to the scandal in November 1891. After a service in his church, he witnessed that he had lived in "immorality" and sought leave from his position. He also voluntarily withdrew from his positions in the charity institutions and as editor of Vestlandsposten. Due to the Constitution's paragraph 63, he also did not take his seat at the Parliament. After the scandal he continued his ministry activities, becoming principal of a new prayer house in Stavanger. Oftedal was elected to the Stavanger City Council in 1898, but died in May 1900 in Stavanger.

== Personal life ==
In 1889 he became a Knight of the Order of St. Olav. In 1865, he was married Olava Mathilde Olsen (1839–1931). He was the father of Lars Oftedal (1877–1932). His grandchildren included physician Sven Oftedal (1905–48) and newspaper editor Christian Oftedal (1907–55).
