= Albert Brock-Utne =

Norwegian religious scholar and anthropologist

- Born: June 4, 1906; Kristiania, Norway
- Died: c. 1990; Oslo, Norway
- Occupations: Religious scholar, anthropologist

Albert Brock-Utne (June 4, 1906 – c. 1990) was a Norwegian scholar of religion and anthropologist.

== Life ==
Albert Brock-Utne was born in Kristiania (now Oslo), the son of the attorney Albert Brock-Utne (1872–1925) and Dagmar Gasmann-Hansen (1876–1925). He studied religious studies under Wilhelm Schencke and received his cand. theol. degree from the University of Oslo in 1932. He also studied sociology under Bronisław Malinowski in London. From 1934 to 1939, he was a university fellow in the history of religion. From 1940 to 1942 he was a lecturer in the history of religion after Schencke's departure. Because of his anti-Nazi activities, in 1943 he fled to Sweden, where he participated in work for Norwegian refugees and opposed the Quisling regime.

After the war, Brock-Utne hoped to become Schencke's successor as a professor, but when the professorship was given to Georg Johan Sverdrup he relocated to Los Angeles, California to become a businessman and fund his further research.

Brock-Utne's research interests focused especially on primitive religions. His Studiet av primitive folk (The Study of Primitive Peoples, 1938) can be regarded as the first Norwegian anthropology textbook.

== Bibliography ==
- En undersøkelse av spørsmålet om "fiendene" i de individuelle klagesalmer i det gamle testamente under hensyn til de opfatninger som er fremsatt i nyere historisk religionsforskning (An Examination of the Question of "Enemies" in the Individual Lamentations of the Old Testament, Taking into Account the Views Expressed in Recent Historical Religious Research). Oslo, 1931
- Der Gottesgarten: eine vergleichende religionsgeschichtliche Studie (The Garden of God: A Comparative Study of the History of Religion). Oslo: Dybwad, 1936
- Milieu and Religion. Copenhagen, 1939
- Religionshistoriens kildeskrifter. 1: Oldegyptiske kildeskrifter (før 700 F. Kr.) (Sources in the History of Religion. 1: Ancient Egyptian Sources, before 700 BC). Copenhagen: Ejnar Munksgaard, 1939
- Studiet av primitive folk: samfundsliv og religion (The Study of Primitive Peoples: Community Life and Religion). Oslo: Norli, 1939
