= Schjøll (name) =

Schjøll is a Norwegian surname. Notable people with the surname include:

- Anita Schjøll Brede (born 1985), Norwegian entrepreneur
- Agnes Victoria (Lila) Schjøll (1881–1926), wife of Wilhelm Schencke
