= Sven Oftedal =

Norwegian American Lutheran minister

Sven Oftedal (March 22, 1844 – March 30, 1911) was a Norwegian American Lutheran minister. He served as the 3rd president of Augsburg University and helped found the Lutheran Free Church.

== Background ==
Sven Svensen Oftedal was born in Stavanger, Norway. He was the son of Sven Larsen Oftedal (1812-1883) and Gunhild Omundsdatter Stokka (1809-1881). His father was a teacher at the Stavanger Cathedral School. His elder brother Lars Svendsen Oftedal (1838 –1900) was a Norwegian priest and social reformer. He was also the founding editor of Stavanger Aftenblad and served as a Member of the Storting.

He graduated from Stavanger Cathedral School in 1862. He studied at the University of Oslo and earned his theology degree in 1871. He also studied languages, philosophy, and theology at several other European universities.

== Career ==
He came to Minneapolis, Minnesota in 1873 to serve as a professor of the New Testament at Augsburg Seminary, predecessor to Augsburg University. Augsburg was the first seminary founded by Norwegian Lutherans in America. August Weenaas, Augsburg's first president, had recruited both Sven Oftedal and Georg Sverdrup from Norway to join the faculty. Sven Oftedal and Georg Sverdrup were scholars from prominent Haugean families in Norway who came to Augsburg, bringing with them a genuinely radical view of Christian education, centered on Scripture and the simple doctrines of Christianity. In time, both Oftedal and Sverdrup would serve as presidents of Augsburg. Additionally, Oftedal was chairman of the board of regents at Augsburg for 36 years.

It was at Augsburg that Oftedal, along with Georg Sverdrup, founded the Lutheran Free Church. Sverdrup, Oftedal and others felt their beliefs were being compromised and broke away from the United Norwegian Lutheran Church of America, forming the Lutheran Free Church in 1897. The denomination would exist as a separate synod until 1963.

In 1877, Sven Oftedal organized the Folkebladet Publishing Company which would merge in 1922 with the Free Church Book Concern. That company would in turn merge with Augsburg Publishing in 1963. Oftedal was also elected to the Minneapolis School Board and was appointed to the Minneapolis Library Board. Additionally, Oftedal served as pastor of Trinity Lutheran Church in Minneapolis for five years. Trinity Lutheran Church, which was founded in 1868, was originally a Norwegian immigrant Lutheran church, which would have roots in the Lutheran Free Church.

== Personal life ==
He was married to Marie Gjertsen (1845-1926). They were the parents of four children. In 1908 he was appointed a Knight 1st Class in the Order of St. Olav. Oftedal died in 1911 and his widow in 1926; both were laid to rest at Lakewood Cemetery in Minneapolis, Minnesota.

== Other sources ==
- Chrislock, Carl H., From Fjord to Freeway: 100 Years, Augsburg College (Minneapolis: Augsburg College, 1969)
- Dyrud, Loiell O., The Quest for Freedom: The Lutheran Free Church to The Association of Free Lutheran Congregations (Minneapolis: Ambassador Publications. 2000)
- Fevold, Eugene L., The Lutheran Free Church: A Fellowship of American Lutheran Congregations 1897-1963 (Minneapolis: Augsburg Publishing House. 1969)
- Nichol, Todd W., All These Lutherans (Minneapolis, MN: Augsburg Publishing House. 1986)
- Tavuchis, Nicholas (2013) Pastors and Immigrants: The Role of a Religious Elite in the Absorption of Norwegian Immigrants (Springer Publishing Company) ISBN 9789401760560
