= Jakob Sverdrup (philologist) =

Norwegian philologist and lexicographer

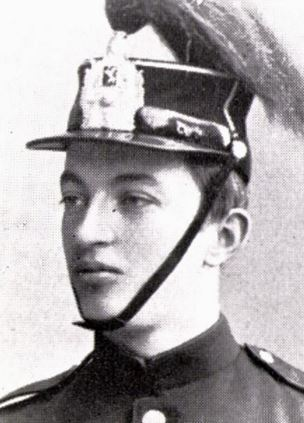
- Born: 10 April 1881
- Died: 21 November 1938 (aged 57)
- Father: Jakob Sverdrup

Academic background
- Thesis: Zum germanischen Verbalsystem

Academic work
- Discipline: philology lexicography
- Sub-discipline: Germanic philology
- Institutions: University of Oslo
- Notable works: German-Norwegian dictionary

Jakob Sverdrup (10 April 1881 – 21 November 1938) was a Norwegian philologist and lexicographer.

== Personal life ==
He was born in Leikanger Municipality as a son of the bishop and politician Jakob Sverdrup (1845–1899). He was a brother of Georg Johan Sverdrup, uncle of historian Jakob Sverdrup, a first cousin of Harald Ulrik Sverdrup Jr., and Leif Sverdrup, a nephew of Georg Sverdrup and Edvard Sverdrup, grandson of Harald Ulrik Sverdrup Sr., grandnephew of Johan Sverdrup and great-grandson of Jacob Liv Borch Sverdrup.

== Career ==
He was hired as a lecturer at the University of Oslo in 1917, took the dr.philos. degree in 1928 with the thesis Zum germanischen Verbalsystem, and was promoted to professor of Germanic philology in 1929. Among his works were a German-Norwegian dictionary, released in two volumes in 1933 and 1936.
