= District No. 182 School =

- U.S. National Register of Historic Places
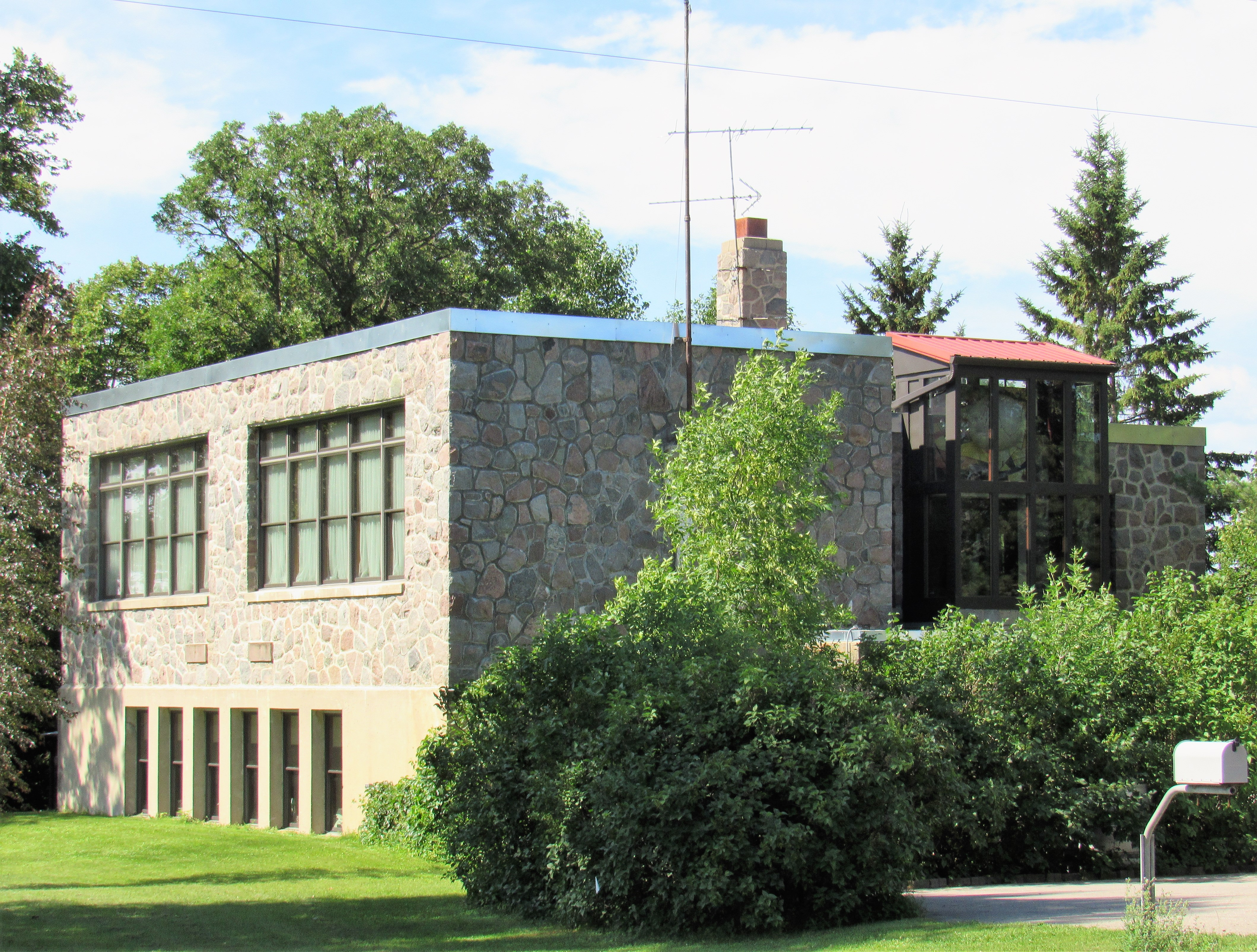

- Location within Minnesota Location within the United States
- Location: Off County Highway 35
- Nearest city: Underwood, Minnesota
- Coordinates: 46°22′07″N 95°51′47″W
- Area: 2.5 acres (1.0 ha)
- Built: 1939
- Built by: Works Progress Administration
- Architect: E.O. Broaten
- Architectural style: Moderne
- MPS: Federal Relief Construction in Minnesota MPS
- NRHP reference No.: 91000978
- Added to NRHP: August 9, 1991

District No. 182 School, also known as the Barnhard School, is a historic building located north of Underwood, in rural Otter Tail County, Minnesota, United States. The building was listed on the National Register of Historic Places in 1991. The school district was established in Sverdrup Township on January 3, 1884, and its first building was a log house constructed by John Randall. It was named for William Barnhard, one of the founders of the district. The log building was replaced the following year by a single-story frame structure, and it was replaced by a two-story frame structure in 1905. By the 1930s this building had become dilapidated and it was considered a fire trap. In July 1938 local voters passed a bond issue and the Works Progress Administration approved the application to construct a new school building. Fergus Falls architect E.O. Broaten designed the building in the Moderne style. The T-shaped structure features a raised basement of exposed reinforced concrete and split-stone walls on the main level. The main level contained two classrooms, a library, and an office, while the basement housed a community room with a stage, a kitchen, fuel room, boiler room, and storage room. The building served as a school until 1982. Five years later a non-profit arts group reopened it as an art center, but foundered after encountering financial difficulties. The former school stood vacant for years and was put up for sale in 2000. Sandra Barhouse, an art professor from St. Cloud State University, purchased the building and undertook an extensive renovation into a private residence and art gallery.
