= Free Lutheran Bible College and Seminary =

Coordinates: 45°00′55.5″N 93°25′04.6″W

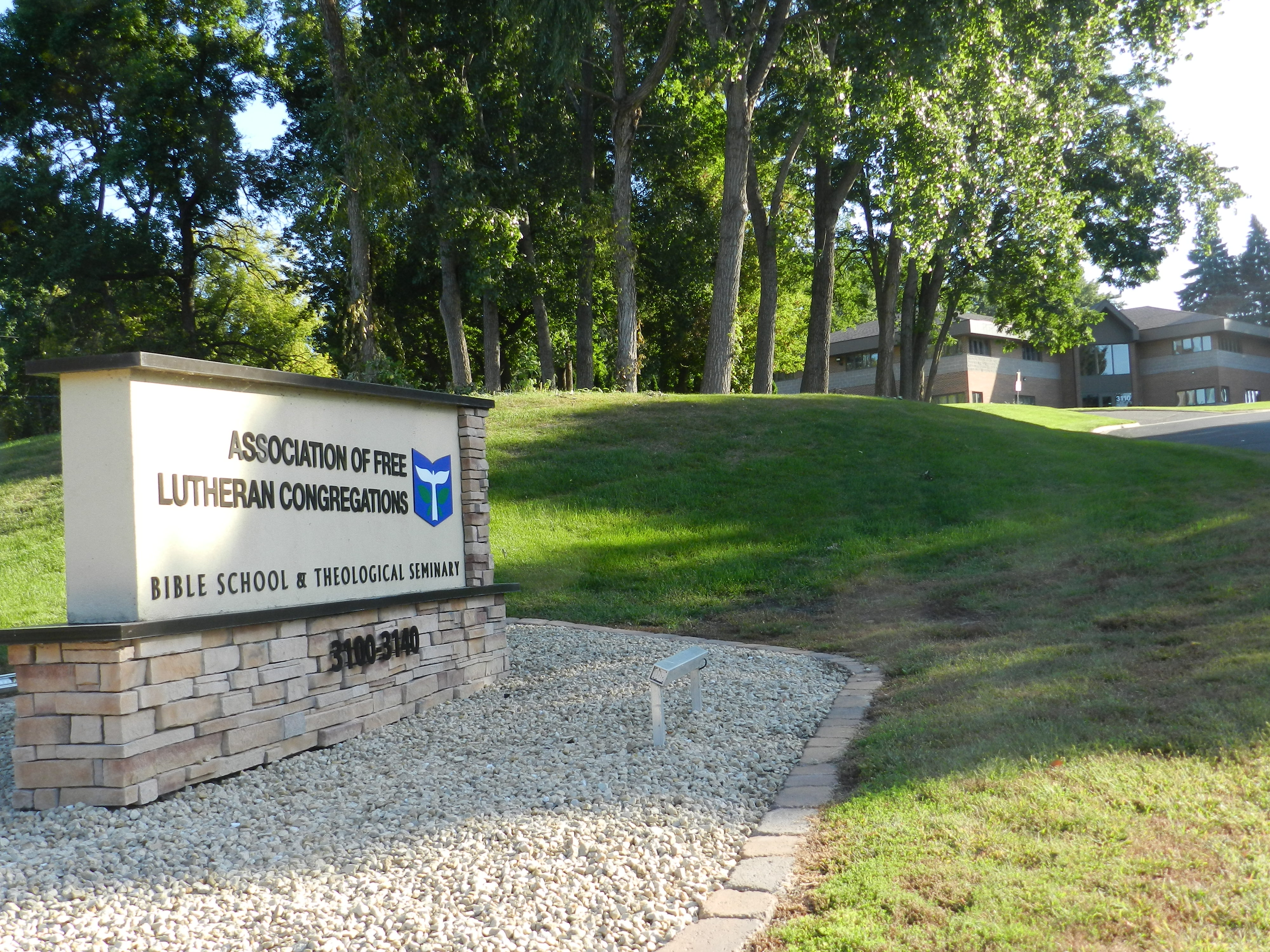
- Former name: Association Free Lutheran Bible School and Seminary
- Established: 1964 in Plymouth, Minnesota
- Affiliations: Association of Free Lutheran Congregations
- President: Rev. Dr. Wade Mobley
- Dean: Bible College: Rev. Adam Osier Seminary: Rev. Dr. James Molstre
- Undergraduates: 116 (2024-2025)
- Postgraduates: 19 (2024-2025)
- Location: Plymouth, Minnesota
- Mascot: Conquerors
- Website: https://flbc.edu/
- Tuition, Room, Board, and Fees $20,700/year (2024-2025)

Free Lutheran Bible College and Seminary (FLBCS) is one institution of higher education consisting of two programs, the undergraduate Free Lutheran Bible College (FLBC) and the four-year pastoral training program Free Lutheran Seminary (FLS). FLBCS is accredited through the Transnational Association of Christian Colleges and Schools (TRACS), a member of the Evangelical Council for Financial Accountability (ECFA), and an associate member of the Association for Biblical Higher Education (ABHE). FLBCS is located in Plymouth, Minnesota, near the national offices of the Association of Free Lutheran Congregations (AFLC).

== Bible College ==
FLBC is an accredited undergraduate institution. It was established in 1966 by the AFLC as the Association Free Lutheran Bible School. AFLC church founders sought to establish education for young Christians in the Bible before college, in efforts to help believers to "win, build and equip". That mission is now stated as "establishing students in the eternal and inerrant Word of God for a life of faith in Jesus Christ and faithful service in His kingdom." Current enrollment is approximately 115 students. FLBC students have attended from outside of the United States including Canada, Latvia, Russia, Czech Republic, Slovakia, Ecuador, Tanzania, Norway, Haiti, Bolivia, Germany, Mexico, and Brazil. The Bible college is a member of the Northern Intercollegiate Athletic Conference (NIAC).

=== Deans of the bible college ===
- Rev. John Strand (1966–1967)
- Rev. Richard Snipstead (1968–1974)
- Rev. Ken Moland (1975–1984)
- Rev. Donald Greven (1985–1996)
- Rev. James L. Johnson (1996–2006)
- Rev. Joel Rolf (2006–2018)
- Rev. Dr. Wade Mobley (interim) (2018–2019)
- Rev. Adam Osier (2019–present)

== Seminary ==
The AFLC established a theological seminary committed to historic Lutheran theology that opened in September 1964. The Free Lutheran Seminary only admits men into the school. Students attend seminary classes for three years. The fourth year is an internship at one of the AFLC churches. Current enrollment hovers around 20 students.

As an institution of the AFLC, the seminary believes and teaches that:

- The Bible is the divinely inspired, revealed, inerrant, and authoritative Word of God and as such is trustworthy in all its parts and is the supreme and only rule of faith and practice.
- The Apostles' Creed, Nicene Creed, Athanasian Creed, the Unaltered Augsburg Confession, and Luther's Small Catechism are faithful expositions of the truths of Scripture.
- The local congregation is the right form of the Kingdom of God on earth. It teaches there is no authority above itself except the Word of God and the Spirit of God.

=== Deans of the seminary ===
- Dr. Iver B. Olson (1965–1971)
- Rev. Amos O. Dyrud (1971–1981)
- Dr. Francis W. Monseth (1981–2013)
- Rev. Robert L. Lee (acting) (2013–2015)
- Rev. Dr. Wade Mobley (2015–2017)
- Rev. Dr. James Molstre (2017–present)

== Renaming ==
The office of president over both programs was established in 2015. The school and seminary names were changed on June 14, 2019, to the Free Lutheran Bible College and Seminary. Soon after, FLBCS built the Student Life Center, containing a gymnasium, coffee shop, locker rooms, and classroom and office space.

=== Presidents ===
- Rev. Dr. Wade Mobley (2015–present) Office established

== Accreditation ==
The Free Lutheran Bible College and Seminary is a member of the Transnational Association of Christian Colleges and Schools (TRACS), receiving Candidate Status on October 21, 2014. TRACS is a religious-based accreditation organization focusing entirely on accrediting primarily small Christian seminaries. It was fully accredited on October 30, 2018, as a Category Ill institution by the TRACS Accreditation Commission.

== See also ==
- List of colleges and universities in Minnesota
- Higher education in Minnesota
