= Sogndal Folk High School =

Folk school in Sogndal, Norway

Coordinates: 61°13′56″N 7°07′04″E

Sogndal Folk High School (Norwegian: Sogndal Folkehøgskule) was a folk high school in Sogndal Municipality, Norway.

One of the first of its kind in Norway, it was founded by Jakob Sverdrup, inspired by Grundtvigianism during his studies, in 1871. Sverdrup was initially headmaster, but following illness he first left the post to his brother Hersleb Sverdrup, then to Henrik Mohn Dahl.
