= Sven Oftedal (politician) =

Norwegian politician

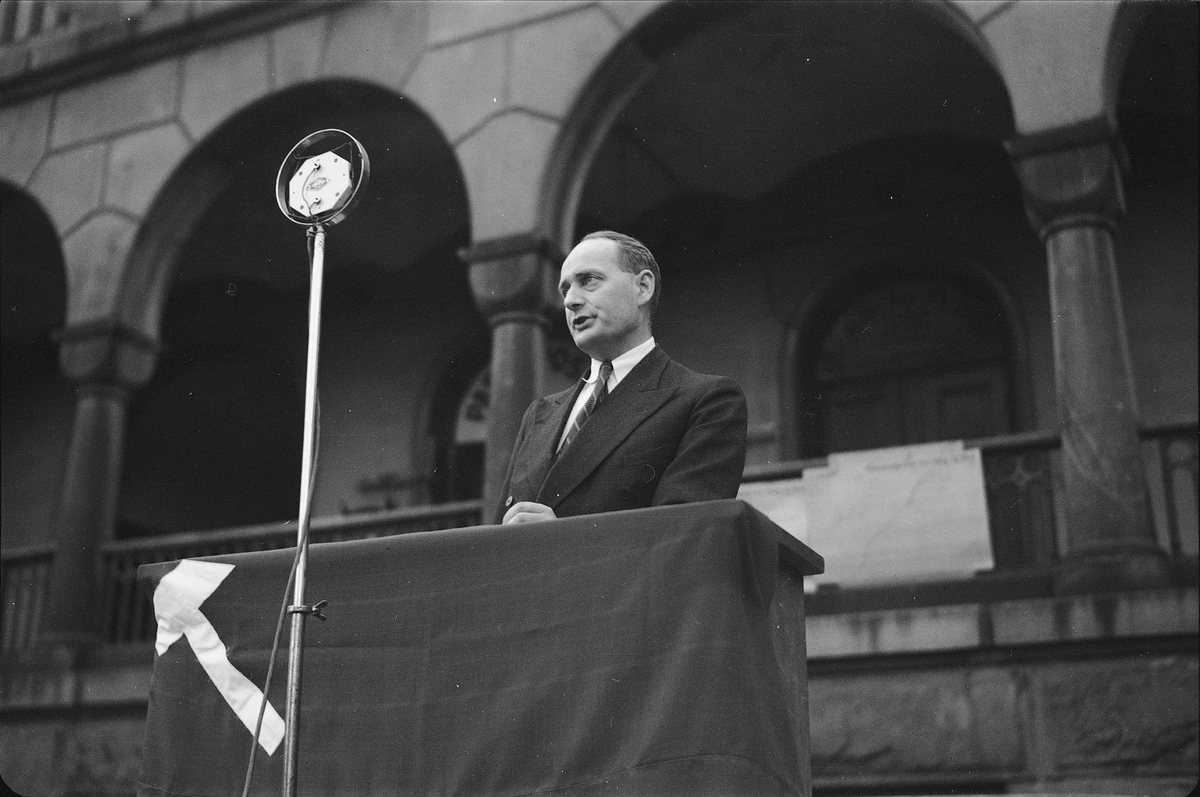
- Oftedal in 1946.

Minister of Social Affairs
- In office 25 June 1945 – 23 June 1948
- Prime Minister: Einar Gerhardsen
- Preceded by: Sverre Støstad
- Succeeded by: Aaslaug Aasland

Member of the Norwegian Parliament
- In office 4 December 1945 – 23 June 1948
- Constituency: Rogaland; Vest-Agder

Personal details
- Born: 3 June 1905 Stavanger, Rogaland, United Kingdoms of Sweden and Norway
- Died: 23 June 1948 (aged 43) Oslo, Norway
- Spouse: Laura Philippa Merete Ziesler (m. 1929)
- Children: 3

Sven Oftedal (3 June 1905 – 23 June 1948) was a Norwegian physician and politician, representing the Labour Party. He was Minister of Social Affairs in 1945-1948 and a member of the Storting over the same period.

== Biography ==
Oftedal was born at Stavanger in Rogaland, Norway. He was the son of Lars Oftedal (1877–1932) and Alice Stephansen (1877–1938). His father was editor of Stavanger Aftenblad. His brother Christian Stephansen Oftedal (1907–1955) was a member of the Norwegian Parliament and served as a member of the Norwegian Nobel Committee.

After graduating from the Stavanger Cathedral School in 1923, he went to the University of Oslo to study medicine. He graduated Cand.med. in 1930. He served at Stavanger Hospital from 1931 to 1932. Oftedal established himself as a private practice doctor in Stavanger from 1933 to 1941. He was elected as a member of Stavanger City Council from 1934 to 1940.

During the Occupation of Norway by Nazi Germany during World War II, his involvement in the resistance movement led to his arrest. In 1941, he was sent to Grini detention camp. He was released but was arrested again in the fall of 1942. In February 1943 he was sent to the German concentration camp Sachsenhausen north of Berlin and stayed there until the German capitulation in 1945. During his captivity, he made an effort to treat prisoners who were particularly prone to dysentery and pneumonia. Oftedal managed to obtain permission from the camp commander to obtain medicine for the prisoners. Regular drug deliveries arrived from both the Norwegian and Swedish Red Cross organizations.

After the liberation of Norway, Oftedal was Social Minister in Einar Gerhardsen's First Government in 1945 and in Einar Gerhard's Second Government from 1945 to 1948. He was elected to the Storting for the period 1945 to 1949 for Vest-Agder and Rogaland. In 1948, he died at 43 years of age as a result of a heart attack and was buried at Vestre gravlund in Oslo. A bust of Sven Oftedal was made by artist Per Palle Storm in 1950 and is located in Stavanger city center.
