= Transnational Association of Christian Colleges and Schools =

Institutional accrediting body

- Logo

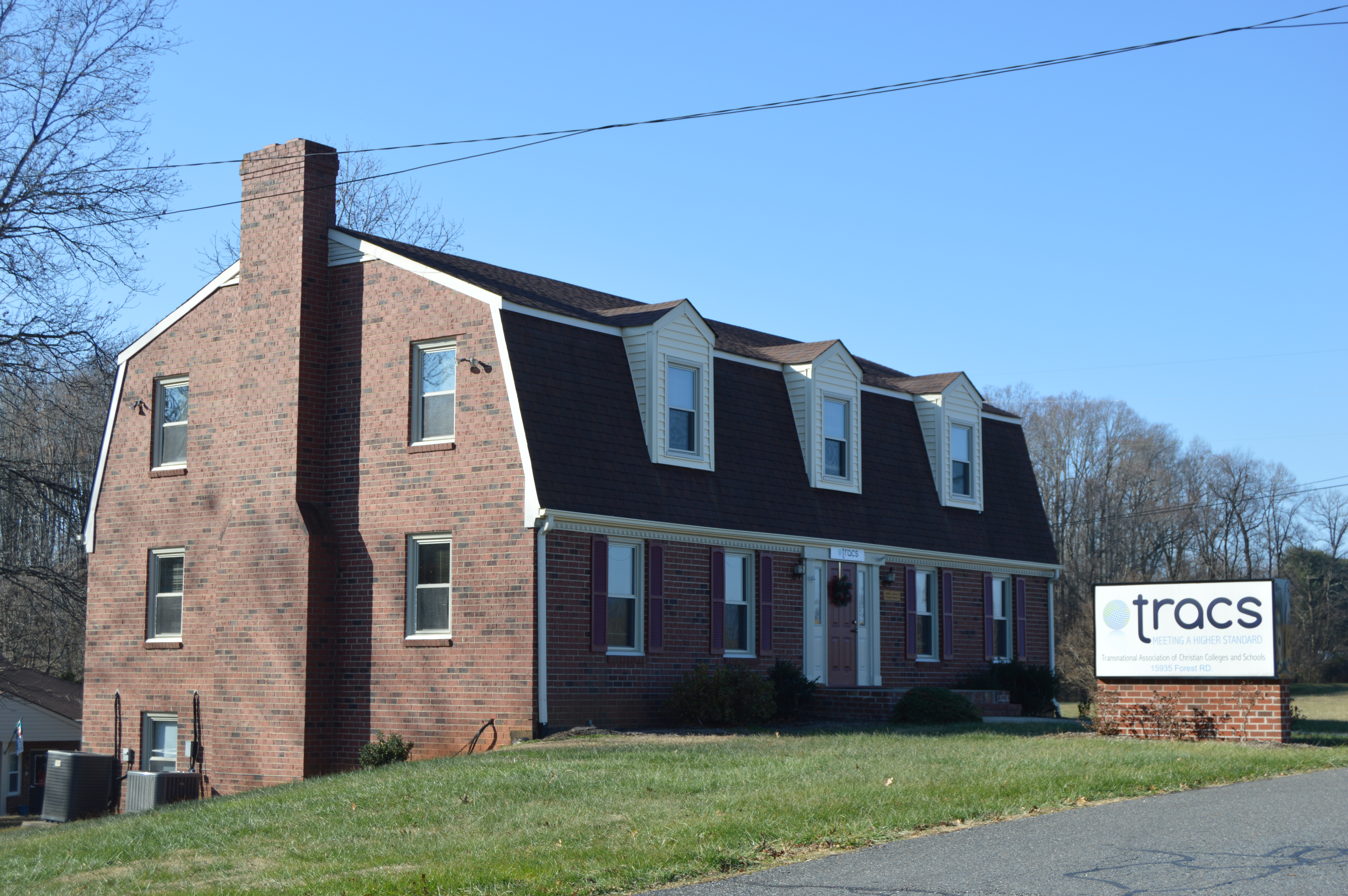
- Headquarters
- Formation: 1979
- Headquarters: 15935 Forest Road
- Location: Forest, Virginia, U.S.
- President: Timothy W. Eaton
- Staff: 12
- Website: www.tracs.org

The Transnational Association of Christian Colleges and Schools (TRACS) is an institutional accreditation organization based in Forest, Virginia. TRACS has been continuously recognized by the United States Department of Education since 1991 and the Council for Higher Education Accreditation since 2001. To receive accreditation, a school must have a statement of faith identifying it as "part of the evangelical protestant tradition in higher education." It is also known for accrediting Historically Black Colleges and Universities that have lost their regional accreditation because of financial issues.

In 2026, there were 109 member institutions accredited by TRACS.

== History ==
The Transnational Association of Christian Colleges and Schools was founded in 1979 as a non-profit organization that accredits Christian post-secondary institutions. According to the Institute for Creation Research (ICR), TRACS is a "product of the ICR".

TRACS's first application for federal recognition in 1987 was denied, but in 1991 under President George H. W. Bush, U.S. Education Secretary Lamar Alexander "approved TRACS, despite his advisory panel's repeatedly recommending against recognition." Approval came following TRACS' third rejection by the board in which Secretary Alexander "arranged for an appeal hearing," and critics of the approval said the move was about politics. TRACS' approval "worried" accrediting officials who concluded that TRACS was not a qualified accreditor and the move was criticized by education officials.

Another source of criticism was the 1991 granting of accreditation to the Institute for Creation Research. One of TRACS' board members was Henry M. Morris, founder of ICR. Attorney Timothy Sandefur called Morris's position on the board "highly questionable". In 2007 John D. Morris, Henry Morris' son, asked TRACS to terminate the ICR's accreditation. The reason was, in part, that the ICR moved to Texas and the state did not recognize TRACS at that time.

In 1993, Steve Levicoff criticized TRACS's expedited accreditation of Liberty University and its creation of a category for schools which it called associate schools. While this category "was not considered an official accreditation," Levicoff argued that TRACS lent its name to a number of "blatantly fraudulent institutions." Liberty gained TRACS accreditation in September 1984, but resigned its accreditation on November 6, 2008. Levicoff did indicate that in response to the criticisms of the book that TRACS did alter its policies, something that a Diploma Mill would not have done.

In 1995, a federal review was conducted and National Advisory Committee on Institutional Quality and Integrity placed TRACS on 18 months probation. Critics argued that TRACS should have never had approval and the reason for the initial rejections "wasn't over doctrine, but whether they were in the process of accrediting schools which truly gave degrees in line with other similar degrees." One reason for the probation was TRACS starting the accrediting process for schools that could not meet basic requirements, such as Nashville Bible College, which was granted "accreditation candidate status" when it had twelve full-time students, seven part-time students, and two part-time faculty members. Improvements were made, including eliminating the "associate schools" category and changing chairmen.

Its most recent scheduled review for recognition was in 2020. TRACS was granted reauthorization after their latest appearance before NACIQI in October 2021.

== Standards for Accreditation ==
TRACS has authority for the accreditation and preaccreditation ("Candidate" status) of postsecondary institutions in the United States that offer certificates, diplomas, associate, baccalaureate, and graduate degrees, including institutions that offer distance education.

TRACS has a multi-step accreditation process to assess institutional quality. This process commences with an initial inquiry and an application orientation to review eligibility requirements. Subsequently, the approved applicant institution conducts a self-study to evaluate its structure and effectiveness and identify areas for improvement. A TRACS evaluation team then conducts a site visit. If the assessment is positive, institutional representatives present the institution to the TRACS Accreditation Commission, which may then confer candidate (pre-accreditation) status. Throughout this process, institutions must demonstrate operational integrity and financial stability, including regular financial reviews by their board of trustees.

=== Statement of faith ===
TRACS required, through at least 2018, all accredited schools to have a statement of faith that affirms "the inerrancy and historicity of the Bible" and "the divine work of non-evolutionary creation including persons in God's image". As of 2024, TRACS stated that all accredited schools are not required to "duplicate the TRACS Biblical Foundations Statement, but the institution's Faith Statement should identify it as part of the evangelical protestant tradition in higher education". TRACS' Statement of Faith outlines the organization's adherence to certain Christian principles, such as the absolute authority of the Bible, as well as the redemptive sacrifice of Jesus. The Statement of Faith also describes a literal interpretation of the Biblical creation story.

== Schools receiving accreditation ==
=== Bible colleges ===
- Typical of member schools are bible colleges like the Free Lutheran Bible College and Seminary of suburban Minneapolis, Minnesota. It was founded in 1966 and received its TRACS accreditation in 2018.

=== Evangelical universities ===
- Bob Jones University has been accredited since 2006. It renounced its segregationist past in 2008, but retained a policy dating from 2000 that banned interracial dating by students without parental permission. School president Bob Jones III had said at the time that he thinks "most people view interracial marriage as an unwise decision" and that "when you date interracially or marry interracially, it cuts you off from people." A succeeding president, Steve Pettit, conceded in 2017 that interracial dating is "not a biblical issue", but maintained that it is still "a social and cultural issue."

=== HBCUs ===
Accredited schools include many that admitted black students during the segregation era and are now known as Historically Black Colleges and Universities (HBCUs). Many are underfunded and at risk of losing accreditation because of financial requirements. For these schools, TRACS is a "lifeline."

- Paul Quinn College lost its regional accreditation in 2009, recovered it under a Temporary Restraining Order and was accredited by TRACS in 2011.
- Morris Brown College lost its regional accreditation in 2002. It was accredited by TRACS in 2022.
- Bennett College lost its regional accreditation in 2018 but recovered it under terms of a Temporary Restraining Order. It was accredited by TRACS in 2023.
- Barber-Scotia College lost its accreditation in 2004; In 2024, after 20 years of being unaccredited, it began seeking accreditation from TRACS.

=== Formerly accredited by TRACS ===
- Liberty University (1984–2008)

== See also ==
- Higher education accreditation in the United States
