= Vestlands-Posten =

Newspaper published in Stavanger, Norway

Vestlands-Posten (or Vestlandsposten) was a newspaper published in Stavanger, Norway from 1878 to 1916.

Vestlands-Posten was founded by Lars Oftedal, a leading politician in the Liberal Party and later the Moderate Liberal Party, who was also a pastor and later a leader in a lay preaching movement. Hartvig Halvorsen was the newspaper's founding editor. Publishing three issues per week, Vestlands-Posten expanded rapidly and in the 1880s was the Norwegian newspaper with the largest readership outside Oslo (Christiania), the capital. Vestlands-Posten became the influential organ for Agrarian Liberals (Bonde-Venstre) and Liberal Party politics, later the Moderate Liberal Party.
