= Association of Free Lutheran Congregations =

American religious body

- Abbreviation: AFLC
- Classification: Protestant
- Orientation: Lutheran
- President: Micah Hjermstad
- Region: United States and Canada
- Headquarters: 3110 East Medicine Lake Blvd. Plymouth, Minnesota 55441
- Origin: 1962
- Separated from: Lutheran Free Church
- Congregations: 253 (2025)
- Members: 44,473 (2009)
- Ministers: 277 (2009)
- Publications: The Lutheran Ambassador
- Official website: www.aflc.org

The Association of Free Lutheran Congregations (AFLC) is the sixth largest Lutheran church body in the United States. The AFLC includes congregations from the former Lutheran Free Church in 27 different U.S. states and four Canadian provinces. The AFLC is not an incorporated synod, but a free association. Each local congregation is a separate corporation. Minnesota is the geographic center of the organization, with over 80 congregations and over 12,000 members. There are also numerous congregations in the neighboring states of North Dakota, South Dakota, and Wisconsin. The AFLC headquarters are in Plymouth, Minnesota, where the Association Free Lutheran Bible School and Seminary are also located.

The beliefs of the AFLC are grounded in Pietist Lutheran tradition. The AFLC logo consists of an open Bible, ascending dove, and green vine. The open Bible is symbolic of God's word as the foundation of faith and life; the ascending dove is symbolic of the freedom of congregation and the power and guidance of the Holy Spirit; and the green vine is symbolic of the living congregation bearing fruit for God.

== History ==
The AFLC was formed in 1962 by 40 congregations of the former Lutheran Free Church that did not want to join the 1963 merger into The American Lutheran Church (ALC). The ALC had been formed in 1960 by the merger of several ethnic Lutheran denominations. The AFLC was originally called the Lutheran Free Church-not merged, but the ALC filed suit against the group for using the name Lutheran Free Church. The name Association of Free Lutheran Congregations was chosen by 1964. In 2006, the AFLC had 43,360 baptized members in 267 churches and in 2009, the AFLC had 277 pastors, 280 congregations, and 44,473 members.

== Doctrine ==
The AFLC accept and believe in the Holy Bible as the complete written Word of God, preserved by the Holy Spirit for salvation and instruction. The AFLC accepts the ancient ecumenical symbols, namely, the Apostles, the Nicene, and the Athanasian Creeds; Luther's Small Catechism, and the unaltered Augsburg Confession, as the true expression of the Christian faith and life.

There were five principal reasons for the formation of the AFLC:

- Recognition of the Bible as the inspired and inerrant authority in all matters of faith and life.
- Recognition that the teaching and preaching of God's Word is the main task of the Church, to be conducted in such a way that the saints are built up and unbelievers see their need for salvation.
- Belief that the congregation is the right form of the Kingdom of God on earth, with no authority above it but the Word and the Spirit of God;
- Belief that Christian unity is a spiritual concept, not a man-made organization such as the World Council of Churches or the National Council of Churches.
- Belief that Christians are called to be a salt and light, separated from the ways of the world, and that this difference is to be reflected in the life of the congregation as well as in the institutions of the church body.

Unlike most other conservative Lutheran bodies in the United States, the AFLC allows open communion and women's suffrage in congregational voting.

== Committees and corporations ==
The AFLC has five corporations that are sponsored by the AFLC to direct their common endeavors: the Coordinating Committee, the Schools Corporation, the Missions Corporation, the AFLC Foundation, and the Association Retreat Center (ARC. There are two auxiliary corporations in the AFLC: the Women's Missionary Federation (WMF) and Free Lutheran Youth (FLY).

=== Coordinating Committee ===
The coordinating committee consists of seven members from the congregations currently part of the AFLC. The main duties of the coordinating committee includes monitoring the pastoral roster, monitoring the congregational roster, and providing guidance for the other ministries of the AFLC, including youth, evangelism, parish education, etc.

=== Schools Corporation ===
The schools corporation's main delegation is the election of the board of trustees, that governs the Free Lutheran Bible College and Seminary (FLBCS). This corporation consists of fifty members from the congregations of the AFLC. The AFLC leaders decided to create a Lutheran Bible School patterned after the fundamental teachings of the Lutheran Bible Institute founded in 1919. The school was opened in 1966 with 13 students but grew to 35 the next year. By the 1990s, the school, renamed to Association Free Lutheran Bible School, was averaging 105 students. Today there are approximately 100 students attending the school.

=== Missions Corporation ===
The missions corporation consists of one hundred members of the congregations of the AFLC and elects from itself a Home Missions Committee and a World Missions Committee which are involved in the outreach of the AFLC into the United States and several other countries.

=== Association Retreat Center ===
The Association Retreat Center (ARC) is a separate organization of the AFLC located near Osceola, Wisconsin, that serves as a retreat center for various activities within the AFLC.

=== Other committees and corporations ===
The Women's Missionary Federation (WMF) serves the women of the churches with Bible studies, fellowship, and has an emphasis on missionary services.

The Free Lutheran Youth (FLY) is a youth organization dealing with youth ministry.

== Publications ==
The official publication of the AFLC is The Lutheran Ambassador, with twelve issues per year devoted to Bible-centered articles and news of the churches. Ambassador Publications is the parish education department of the AFLC.

The Ambassador Hymnal is the hymnal published by the AFLC. It contains over 600 hymns as well as a selected order of church services and responsive Bible readings.

== Presidents ==
- John P. Strand (1962–1978)
- Richard Snipstead (1978–1992)
- Robert L. Lee (1992–2007)
- Elden K. Nelson (2007–2013)
- Lyndon Korhonen (2013–2022)
- Micah Hjermstad (2022-Present)

== Annual conferences ==
The AFLC schedules an annual conference to share reports of congregations and other various ministries. The main reason for these conferences is spiritual edification, as the schedules include prayer times, worship hours, and business meetings together. At the conference, suggestions for changes are presented and discussed and the elections for positions in committees/corporations are conducted.

- 1963 Fargo, North Dakota
- 1964 Valley City, North Dakota
- 1965 Minneapolis, Minnesota
- 1966 Thief River Falls, Minnesota
- 1967 Fargo, North Dakota
- 1968 Cloquet, Minnesota
- 1969 Minneapolis, Minnesota
- 1970 Valley City, North Dakota
- 1971 Cloquet, Minnesota
- 1972 Minneapolis, Minnesota
- 1973 Ferndale, Washington
- 1974 Thief River Falls, Minnesota
- 1975 Minneapolis, Minnesota
- 1976 Hancock, Minnesota
- 1977 Fargo, North Dakota
- 1978 Minneapolis, Minnesota
- 1979 Whitefish, Montana
- 1980 Valley City, North Dakota
- 1981 Minneapolis, Minnesota
- 1982 Dickinson, North Dakota
- 1983 Osceola, Wisconsin
- 1984 Minneapolis, Minnesota
- 1985 Osceola, Wisconsin
- 1986 Warm Beach, Washington
- 1987 Thief River Falls, Minnesota
- 1988 DeKalb, Illinois
- 1989 Minot, North Dakota
- 1990 Bloomington, Minnesota
- 1991 Osceola, Wisconsin
- 1992 Osceola, Wisconsin
- 1993 DeKalb, Illinois
- 1994 Valley City, North Dakota
- 1995 Osceola, Wisconsin
- 1996 Stanwood, Washington
- 1997 Thief River Falls, Minnesota
- 1998 Red Wing, Minnesota
- 1999 Fergus Falls, Minnesota
- 2000 Osceola, Wisconsin
- 2001 Williston, North Dakota
- 2002 El Campo, Texas
- 2003 Brookings, South Dakota
- 2004 Osceola, Wisconsin
- 2005 Valley City, North Dakota
- 2006 Stanwood, Washington
- 2007 Sioux Falls, South Dakota
- 2008 Oklahoma City, Oklahoma
- 2009 Fergus Falls, Minnesota
- 2010 Plymouth, Minnesota
- 2011 Sioux Falls, South Dakota
- 2012 Thief River Falls, Minnesota
- 2013 Osceola, Wisconsin
- 2014 Valley City, North Dakota
- 2015 Stanwood, Washington
- 2016 Osceola, Wisconsin
- 2017 Plymouth, Minnesota
- 2018 Dickinson, North Dakota
- 2019 Canadensis, Pennsylvania
- 2020 Osceola, Wisconsin
- 2021 Plymouth, Minnesota
- 2022 Osceola, Wisconsin
- 2023 Sioux Falls, South Dakota
- 2024 Plymouth, Minnesota
- 2025 Osceola, Wisconsin
- 2026 Moorhead, Minnesota

== See also ==
- List of Lutheran denominations
