= Lars Oftedal =

Norwegian attorney and newspaper editor

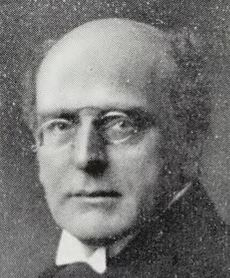

Minister of Trade
- In office 15 February 1928 – 12 May 1931
- Prime Minister: J. L. Mowinckel
- Preceded by: Anton L. Alvestad
- Succeeded by: Per Larssen
- In office 20 October 1922 – 6 March 1923
- Prime Minister: Otto Blehr
- Preceded by: J. L. Mowinckel
- Succeeded by: Johan Rye Holmboe

Minister of Social Affairs
- In office 25 July 1924 – 5 March 1926
- Prime Minister: J. L. Mowinckel
- Preceded by: Odd Klingenberg
- Succeeded by: Peter A. Morell
- In office 22 June 1921 – 20 October 1922
- Prime Minister: Otto Blehr
- Preceded by: Odd Klingenberg
- Succeeded by: Rasmus Mortensen

Personal details
- Born: 3 January 1877 Stavanger, Rogaland, Sweden-Norway
- Died: 19 April 1932 (aged 55)
- Party: Liberal
- Spouse: Alice Stephensen

Lars Oftedal (3 January 1877 – 19 April 1932) was a Norwegian attorney and newspaper editor.

== Biography ==
Oftedal was born in Stavanger in Rogaland, Norway. He was the son of parish priest Lars Oftedal (1838–1900) and his wife Olava Mathilde Ohlsen (1839–1931). His father was the founding editor of Stavanger Aftenblad and also served as a member of the Storting.

Oftedal attended Kongsgaard skole in Stavanger and took Cand. jur. in 1899. He was editor of Stavanger Aftenblad from 1900 to 1921. He served on the Stavanger city council from 1907 until 1921. From 1916 to 1918 he was deputy to the Storting and was elected as a permanent representative in 1922 and 1925. He was Minister of Social Affairs 1921-1922 and 1924-1926 in Prime Minister Mowinckel's First Cabinet. He served as Minister of Trade in 1922-1923 and 1928-1931 in Prime Minister Mowinckel's Second Cabinet.

== Personal life ==
He was married to Alice Stephansen (1877-1938). They were the parents of physician Sven Oftedal (1905–1948) and newspaper editor Christian S. Oftedal (1907–1955).
