= Sverdrup Township, Otter Tail County, Minnesota =

Sverdrup Township, Minnesota
- Township
- Location of Sverdrup Township, within Otter Tail County, Minnesota

- Location within the state of Minnesota Sverdrup Township, Minnesota (the United States)
- Coordinates: 46°19′52″N 95°50′48″W
- Country: United States
- State: Minnesota
- County: Otter Tail

Area
  - Total: 35.7 sq mi (92.4 km^{2})
  - Land: 28.5 sq mi (73.7 km^{2})
  - Water: 7.2 sq mi (18.7 km^{2})
- Elevation: 1,342 ft (409 m)

Population (2020)
  - Total: 646
  - Density: 22.7/sq mi (8.77/km^{2})
- Time zone: UTC-6 (Central (CST))
  - Summer (DST): UTC-5 (CDT)
- ZIP code: 56586
- Area code: 218
- FIPS code: 27-63688
- GNIS feature ID: 0665747

Sverdrup Township is a township in Otter Tail County, Minnesota, United States. The population was 646 at the 2020 census.

Sverdrup Township was organized in 1878, and named for Georg Sverdrup, president of Augsburg Seminary.

== Geography ==
According to the United States Census Bureau, the township has a total area of 35.7 square miles (92.4 km^{2}), of which 28.4 square miles (73.7 km^{2}) is land and 7.2 square miles (18.7 km^{2}) (20.25%) is water.

== Demographics ==
As of the census of 2000, there were 577 people, 236 households, and 182 families residing in the township. The population density was 20.3 people per square mile (7.8/km^{2}). There were 450 housing units at an average density of 15.8/sq mi (6.1/km^{2}). The racial makeup of the township was 98.27% White, 0.35% African American, 0.17% Native American, 0.35% Asian, 0.35% from other races, and 0.52% from two or more races. Hispanic or Latino of any race were 0.87% of the population.

There were 236 households, out of which 28.0% had children under the age of 18 living with them, 70.8% were married couples living together, 3.8% had a female householder with no husband present, and 22.5% were non-families. 19.5% of all households were made up of individuals, and 8.5% had someone living alone who was 65 years of age or older. The average household size was 2.44 and the average family size was 2.79.

In the township the population was spread out, with 21.5% under the age of 18, 6.6% from 18 to 24, 22.5% from 25 to 44, 31.4% from 45 to 64, and 18.0% who were 65 years of age or older. The median age was 44 years. For every 100 females, there were 112.9 males. For every 100 females age 18 and over, there were 105.9 males.

The median income for a household in the township was $47,431, and the median income for a family was $51,161. Males had a median income of $35,000 versus $21,923 for females. The per capita income for the township was $20,962. About 4.5% of families and 5.6% of the population were below the poverty line, including 1.6% of those under age 18 and 10.6% of those age 65 or over.

== See also ==
- District No. 182 School, which is listed on the National Register of Historic Places
