= Jakob Sverdrup (politician) =

Norwegian politician

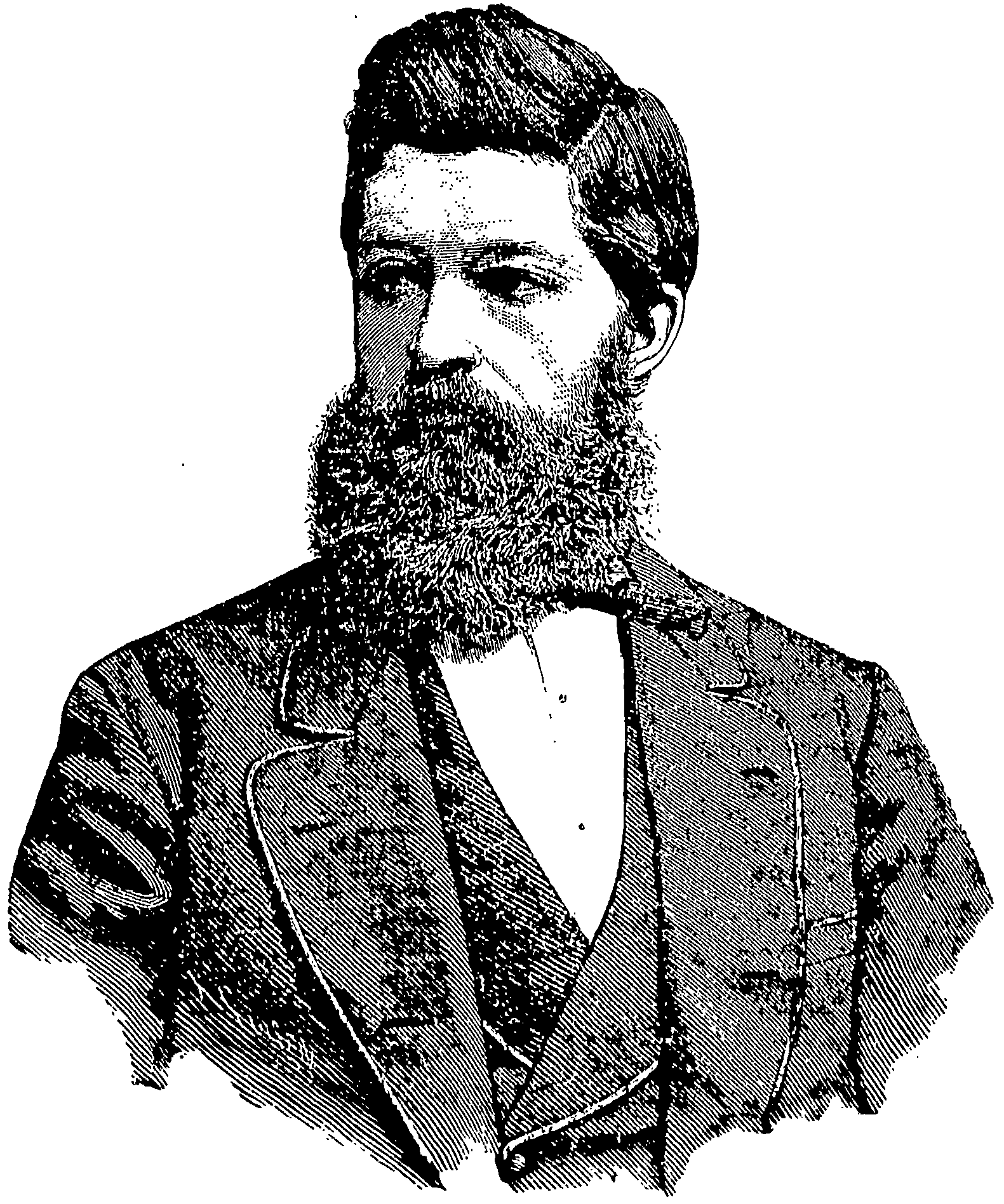

Minister of Education and Church Affairs
- In office 14 October 1895 – 17 February 1898
- Prime Minister: Francis Hagerup
- Preceded by: Emil Stang
- Succeeded by: Vilhelm Wexelsen
- In office 24 February 1888 – 13 July 1889
- Prime Minister: Johan Sverdrup
- Preceded by: Elias Blix
- Succeeded by: Jacob A. Bonnevie
- In office 15 August 1885 – 1 November 1886
- Prime Minister: Johan Sverdrup
- Preceded by: Elias Blix
- Succeeded by: Elias Blix

Minister of Auditing
- In office 1 November 1886 – 5 March 1888
- Prime Minister: Johan Sverdrup
- Preceded by: Birger Kildal
- Succeeded by: Lars K. Liestøl

Personal details
- Born: Jakob Liv Rosted Sverdrup; 27 March 1845 Christiania, United Kingdoms of Sweden and Norway
- Died: 11 June 1899 (aged 54) Aker, United Kingdoms of Sweden and Norway
- Party: Moderate Liberal; Liberal (formerly)
- Spouse: Marie Bernhardine Suur (m. 1871)
- Children: 3

Jakob Liv Rosted Sverdrup (27 March 1845 – 11 June 1899) was a Norwegian bishop and politician. Born into a prominent local family and well-educated, Jakob followed in the footsteps of his father Harald Ulrik Sverdrup and his uncle Johan Sverdrup by pursuing both a theological and political life. He served five terms in the Norwegian Parliament between 1877 and 1898, and was a cabinet member on several occasions. Originally a member of the Liberal Party, he later joined the Moderate Liberal Party, having partially been the cause of the split that formed the Moderate Liberal Party. He has been referred to as "one of the most controversial figures in modern Norwegian history".

== Personal life ==
Sverdrup, born in Christiania, was the first of Harald Ulrik Sverdrup and Caroline Suur's eight children, one of five sons. Raised in Balestrand Municipality in the county of Nordre Bergenhus Amt, his father was a prominent local figure in ecclesiastical and political affairs, as a priest, mayor and member of the Norwegian Parliament. Johan Sverdrup, his uncle, was Prime Minister of Norway from 1884 to 1889. Jakob Sverdrup was close to his brother Georg Sverdrup, who emigrated to the United States in 1874 and later became the President of the Augsburg Seminary. His youngest brother Edvard Sverdrup became a professor of the MF Norwegian School of Theology in Oslo.

Jakob Sverdrup fathered the academics Jakob Sverdrup, Jr. and Georg Johan Sverdrup, and was the uncle of oceanographer and meteorologist Harald Ulrik Sverdrup. His daughter Aslaug Sverdrup took the doctor's degree too, and was married to biologist Iacob Dybwad Sømme from January 1930 to 1942.

== Career ==
Sverdrup enrolled as a student, and graduated with the cand.theol. degree in 1869. Inspired by Grundtvigianism, he founded a folk high school in Sogndalsfjøra in 1871. Serving as savings bank director as well as mayor of Sogndal Municipality, he was the manager of Sogndal folk high school from its foundation, but left that post to his brother Hersleb Sverdrup after a few years, before Henrik Mohn Dahl took over. In 1878 Jakob Sverdrup left Sogndal to become vicar at Leikanger Church in Leikanger Municipality. As a theologian, Sverdrup was a pietist, and sided with the laity movement, proposing that lay priests be given the right to preach. Together with Ole Vollan he had started the magazine Ny Luthersk Kirketidende in 1877, an organ which spoke against the Conservative High Church Lutheranism of the time. Sverdrup also published several pamphlets during his life, and in 1897 he published Forklaring over Luthers lille katekisme af J. R. Sverdrup, a revision of the explanation of Luther's Small Catechism originally written by his father.

=== National politics ===
Sverdrup was elected to the Norwegian Parliament in 1877, representing the constituency of Nordre Bergenhus Amt. He was re-elected in 1880 and 1883, and joined the newly established Liberal Party, of which his uncle Johan was the founder and chairman. When the Liberal cabinet Sverdrup took over in 1884, Jakob Sverdrup was a candidate for the position as Minister of Education and Church Affairs. However, due to King Oscar II opposing this, Sverdrup was instead appointed a member of the Council of State Division in Stockholm, effective from 26 June 1884.

However, already on 1 August 1885 Sverdrup was appointed Minister of Church Affairs, replacing Elias Blix. He held this position for a year, but had already become embroiled in controversy. In June 1885 the Norwegian Parliament had voted over whether to grant a poet's pension to the novelist Alexander Kielland. A Christian conservative wing of the Liberal Party, informally spearheaded by Lars Oftedal, stopped this proposition together with the Conservative Party. Kielland was seen as undermining Christian authority and morale in general. The decision was lambasted by Bjørnstjerne Bjørnson, who personally sent a similar application the next year; when it was voted down, Bjørnson protested by renouncing his own poet's pension. A commentator in the liberal newspaper Verdens Gang stated that Jakob Sverdrup was the true mastermind of his uncle's cabinet. The newspaper also speculated on a possible split of the Liberal Party, citing the Kielland case as a part of a broader trend that the Liberal Party failed to actually reform society in a liberal direction. Talks of "Moderate" and "True" Liberals had surfaced already ahead of the 1885 election.

When installed as Minister of Church Affairs, then, Jakob Sverdrup tried vigorously to establish so-called parish councils, increasing the local democracy in the Church of Norway, but he was voted down by the "True" Liberals in Parliament who in this case sided with the Conservative Party. Several cabinet members demanded Sverdrup's resignation, but instead he was transferred to the post as Minister of Auditing on 31 July 1886, allowing Elias Blix to return as Minister of Church Affairs. However, the controversy continued to grow, and in 1888 the cabinet members Hans Rasmus Astrup, Birger Kildal, Sofus Anton Birger Arctander and Elias Blix withdrew from their positions in protest. Thus, on 24 February 1888 Sverdrup returned as Minister of Church Affairs, holding two posts for a while before a replacement as Minister of Auditing was found on 4 March 1888. On 12 July 1889 the cabinet Sverdrup fell. The Liberal Party had been split, with a breakaway faction forming the Moderate Liberal Party, and this gave way for the Conservative first cabinet Stang.

In 1890 Jakob Sverdrup moved from Nordre Bergenhus Amt to become a vicar in Bergen. Nonetheless, he was placed on the party ticket in his old county Nordre Bergenhus Amt for the forthcoming election. He was thus elected twice, in 1892 and 1895, but now belonged to the Moderate Liberal Party. Following the latter election Jakob Sverdrup was twice asked by King Oscar II to form a new cabinet, but the efforts failed. Instead, the Conservative-Moderate first cabinet Hagerup assumed office on 14 October 1895, where Jakob Sverdrup was appointed Minister of Church Affairs for a third time. He held this position until the first cabinet Hagerup fell on 17 February 1898. The same year he was appointed as the new bishop of the Diocese of Bjørgvin; however, he never actually assumed the office due to health problems. He died in June 1899.

Sverdrup was decorated with the Royal Norwegian Order of St. Olav in 1885 and was a Commander of the Swedish Order of the Polar Star.

Political offices
Preceded by Elias Blix	Norwegian Minister of Education and Church Affairs; 1885–1886	Succeeded by Elias Blix
Preceded by Birger Kildal	Norwegian Minister of Auditing; 1886–1888	Succeeded by Lars Knutson Liestøl
Preceded by Elias Blix	Norwegian Minister of Education and Church Affairs; 1888–1889	Succeeded by Jacob Aall Bonnevie
Preceded by Emil Stang	Norwegian Minister of Education and Church Affairs; 1895–1898	Succeeded by Vilhelm Andreas Wexelsen
