= Wilhelm Schencke =

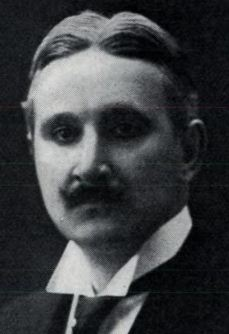
- Born: January 9, 1869; Kristiania, Norway
- Died: June 29, 1946 (aged 77); Gråkammen, Aker, Norway
- Education: University of Kristiania
- Occupation: Religious historian

Johann Friedrich Wilhelm Schencke (January 9, 1869 – June 29, 1946) was a Norwegian historian and professor. He was a specialist in Semitic languages and the history of religion.

== Biography ==
Schencke was born at Kristiania (now Oslo), Norway. He was the son of the architect Friedrich Wilhelm Schencke (1832–1896) and Marie Edvardine Bøhm (1848–?). In 1902 he married Agnes Victoria (Lila) Schjøll (1881–1926).

Schencke received a theology degree in 1894 at the University of Kristiania but he chose to not become a priest. Theological dogmatism did not appeal to him, but he had a strong interest in Old Testament studies. After graduating, he studied religious history, Egyptology, and Semitic languages in Germany.

In 1896, Schencke applied for a professorship in Old Testament theology, but he felt obliged to withdraw his application because another applicant was already determined to obtain the position. In 1901, he was offered a stipend for doctoral study in "religious studies" by William Brede Kristensen. Schencke later changed the position of the title to "history of religion." On March 24, 1904, he defended his dissertation Amon-Re. En studie over forholdet mellem enhed og mangfoldighed under udviklingen af det ægyptiske gudsbegreb (Amon-Re: A Study of the Relationship between Unity and Diversity during the Development of the Egyptian Concept of God).

At the University of Kristiania, Schencke lectured on topics including Judaism, Hellenism, the Quran, Egyptian religion, Luqman's fables, primitive religion, Pistis Sophia (a Gnostic text), and the Parsis in Europe. In addition, he taught Arabic grammar, Hebrew, and Aramaic. Most of his lectures had a small number of students, but lectures on more popular topics could have as many as 250 listeners.

In 1913, Schencke openly declared his opposition to the Faculty of Theology when he wrote an article for the newspaper Tidens Tegn entitled "Det teologiske fakultet bør sløifes" (The Faculty of Theology Should Be Abolished).

On July 1, 1914, Schencke was named Norway's first professor of religious history. The professorship was assigned to the Faculty of History and Philosophy at the university. One of the reasons for this was that Schencke had many opponents at the Faculty of Theology because of his pronounced agnosticism. Schencke fell seriously ill in 1919 and suffered from long periods of illnesses in the following years. He retired as a professor on August 1, 1939. The only fellowship recipient that studied under him was Albert Brock-Utne, who lectured on religious studies after Schencke's departure in 1939. Georg Johan Sverdrup assumed Schencke's professorship after the Second World War.

As a professor emeritus, Schencke lectured on the Quran and Egyptian texts. Schencke prepared the first translation of the Quran into Norwegian (over 30 years before Einar Berg's translation, published in 1980). The translation was only available as a handwritten manuscript, and it disappeared from the University of Oslo Library in the fall of 1946.
