= Leikanger Church =

Church in Vestland, Norway

- Leikanger kyrkje
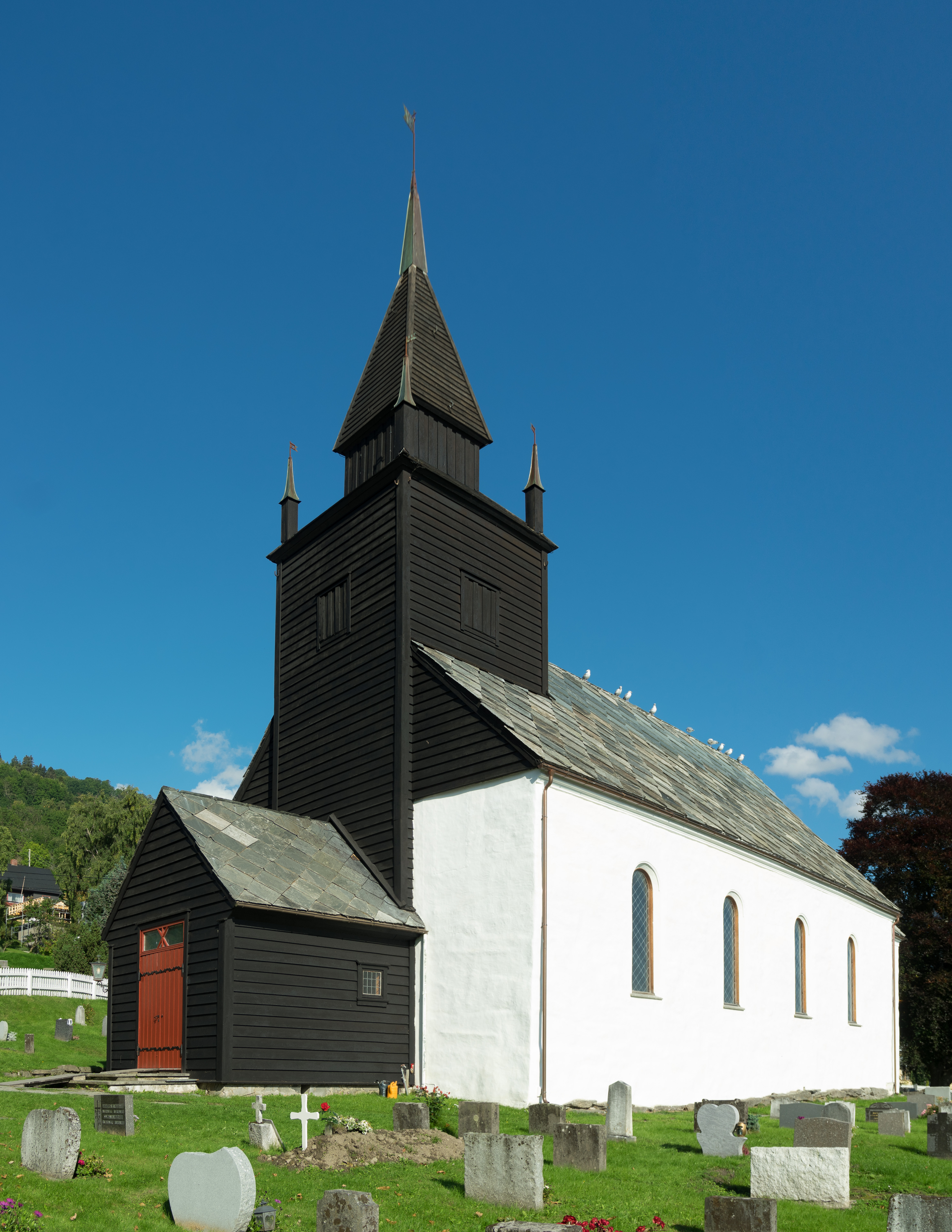
- View of the church
- Leikanger Church
- 61°11′07″N 6°49′10″E
- Location: Sogndal Municipality, Vestland
- Country: Norway
- Denomination: Church of Norway
- Previous denomination: Catholic Church
- Churchmanship: Evangelical Lutheran

History
- Status: Parish church
- Founded: 12th century
- Consecrated: 12th century

Architecture
- Functional status: Active
- Architectural type: Long church
- Completed: c. 1200 (826 years ago)

Specifications
- Capacity: 220
- Materials: Stone

Administration
- Diocese: Bjørgvin bispedømme
- Deanery: Sogn prosti
- Parish: Leikanger
- Norwegian Cultural Heritage Site
- Type: Church
- Status: Automatically protected
- ID: 84922

Leikanger Church (Norwegian: Leikanger kyrkje) is a parish church of the Church of Norway in Sogndal Municipality in Vestland county, Norway. It is located in the village of Leikanger, along the northern coast of the Sognefjorden. It is the church for the Leikanger parish which is part of the Sogn prosti (deanery) in the Diocese of Bjørgvin. The white, stone church has a large wooden steeple. The building was constructed in a long church design around the year 1250 using plans drawn up by an unknown architect. The church seats about 220 people.

== History ==
The earliest existing historical records of the church date back to the year 1308, but the church was not new that year. The stone church was probably first built during the 12th century. The west portal in the church has been dated to the late-1100s. Around the year 1200, the choir was rebuilt and enlarged. The dimensions of the building after this expansion were about 15.2 by 8.1 metres (50 ft × 27 ft). (Some sources say that this rebuilding of the choir may have been a whole new church built after removing the old church.) Parts of the building have been renovated and rebuilt over the centuries. In the 1660s, the church was renovated. The chancel was reconstructed and the old tower was torn down and rebuilt in a neo-gothic style. At the same time, the walls were repaired and an attic area was created. After this renovation, the church was said to be about 20.5 by 13 metres (67 ft × 43 ft).

In 1814, this church served as an election church (Norwegian: valgkirke). Together with more than 300 other parish churches across Norway, it was a polling station for elections to the 1814 Norwegian Constituent Assembly which wrote the Constitution of Norway. This was Norway's first national elections. Each church parish was a constituency that elected people called "electors" who later met together in each county to elect the representatives for the assembly that was to meet at Eidsvoll Manor later that year.

In 1872, the church was heavily renovated by the architect Christian Christie. During this reconstruction, the entire choir was torn down, the nave was lengthened to the east, and then a new choir was built. Also, a new wooden church porch and tower was built on the west end. The redesigned church was consecrated on 14 November 1872 by Bishop Peter Hersleb Graah Birkeland after the extensive reconstruction. In the 1930s through the 1950s, the church was again renovated, this time under the direction of the architect Johan Lindstrøm. This included a completely rebuilt wooden tower, and a focus on bringing back the historic look of the building.

=== Priests ===
There have been many priests to serve this church since the Reformation:

- Jon Røg, 1537–1552
- Magister Erik Loss, 1550–1565
- Jens Engelsøn, 1565–1607
- Magister Hans Kruse, 1607–1617
- Hans Nilsen Arctander, 1617–1618
- Erik Iversen Nordal, 1618–1658
- Jens Bugge, 1658–1684
- Magister Samuel Bugge, 1685–1718
- Iver Iversen Leganger 1719–1750
- Gerhard Geelmuyden, 1750–1764
- Ole Bernhoft Friis, 1764–1782
- Nils Frantzsøn Wolff, 1783–1789
- Anders Daae, 1789–1819
- Nils Norman, 1816–1822
- Peter Johan Norman, 1823–1839
- Søren Wilhelm Thorne, 1840–1849
- Johan David Haslund, 1849–1869
- Iver Olaus Widerøe, 1870–1878
- Jakob Liv Rosted Sverdrup, 1878–1884
- Jakob Walnum, 1884–1896
- Fredrik Vilhelm Bull-Hansen, 1897–1923
- Sverre Daae, 1923–1945
- Nils Ruset, 1945–1950
- Sverre Daae, 1950–1960
- Einar Bjorvand, 1960–1965
- Oddmund Hjermann, 1965–1975
- Bjarne Imenes, 1975–1985
- Einar Hansen, 1986–1988
- Tore Wigen, 1989–1990
- Kjell Sæter, 1991–2007
- Egon Askvik, 2008–2016
- Vegard Bondevik Lie, 2016–

== Media gallery ==
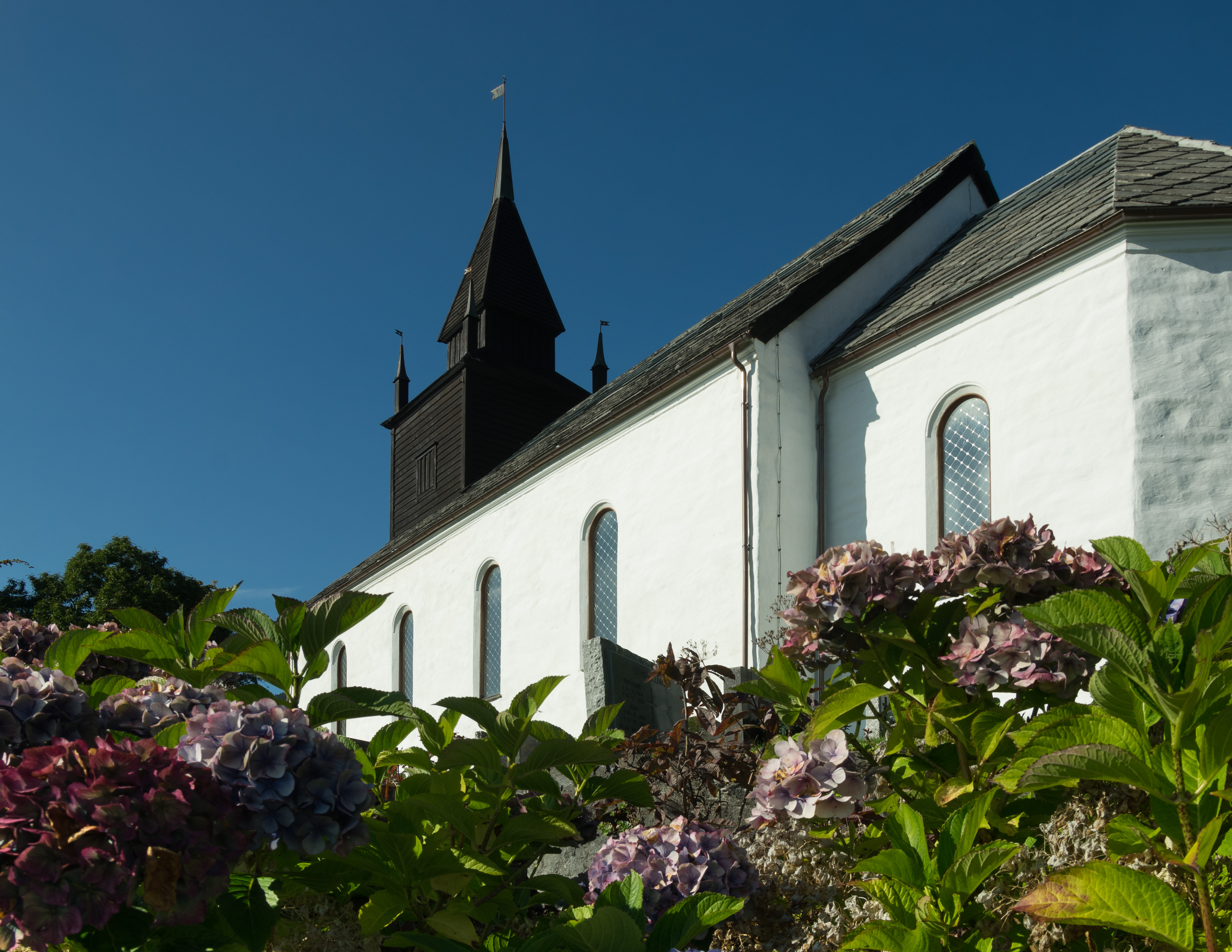

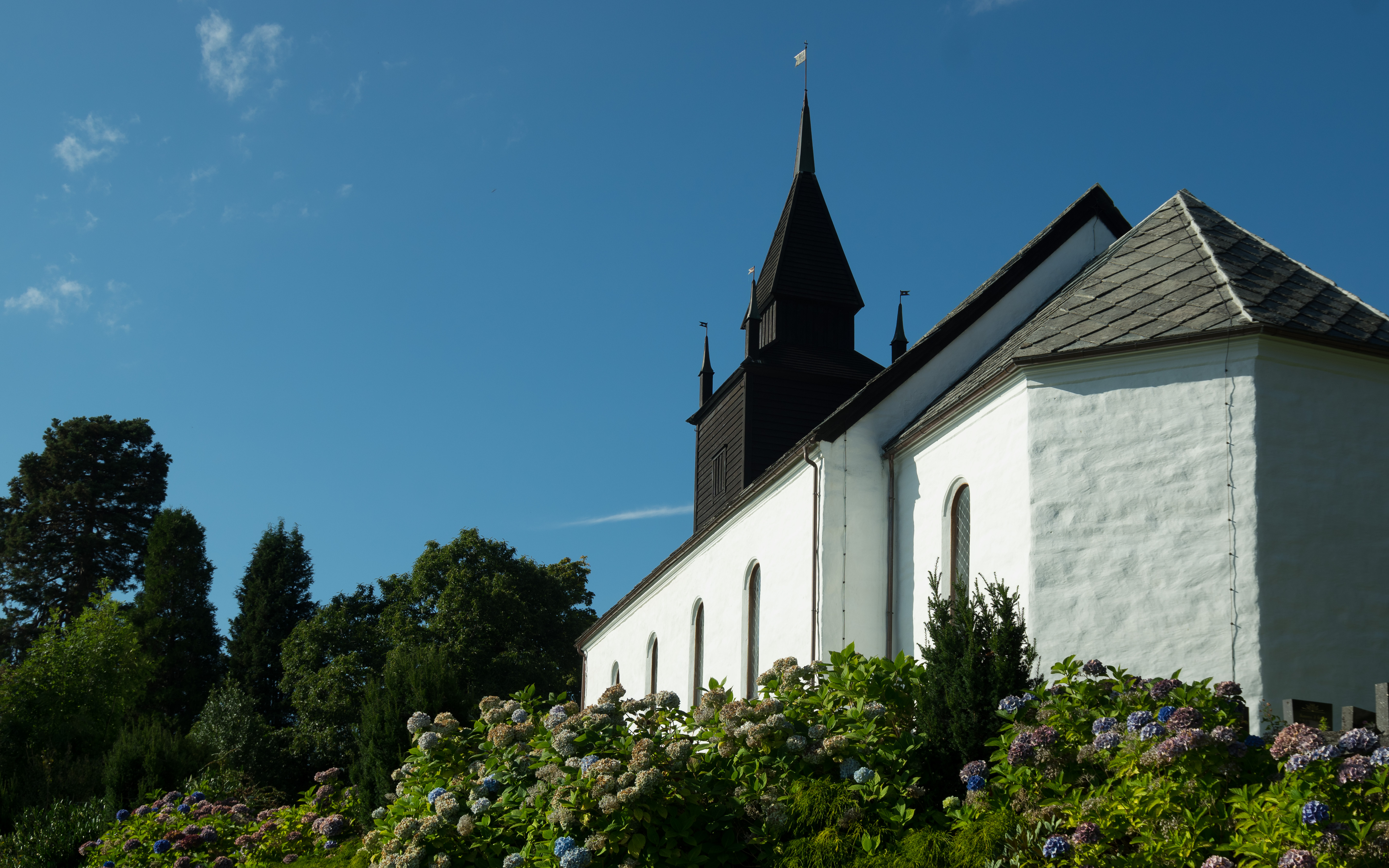

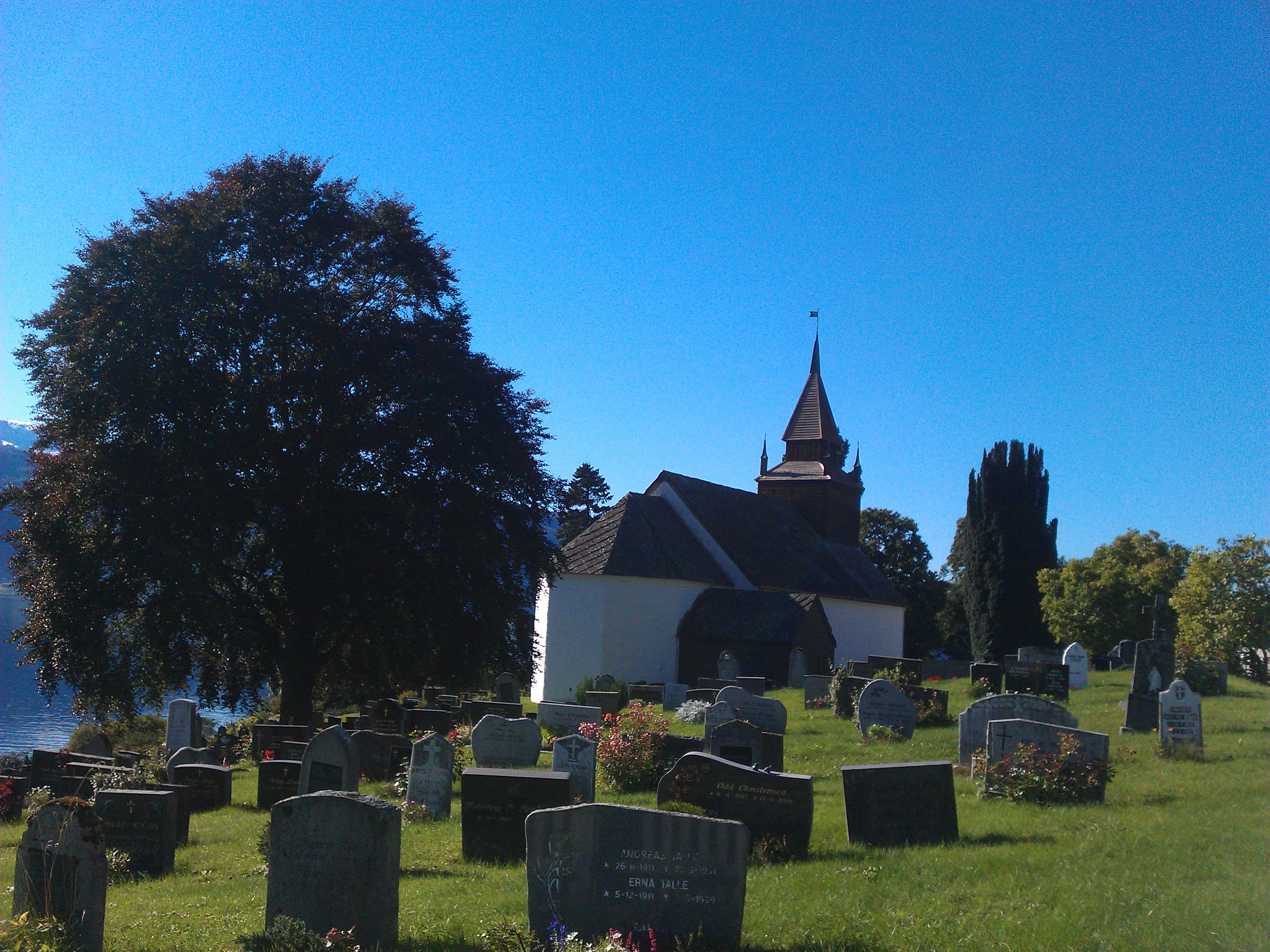

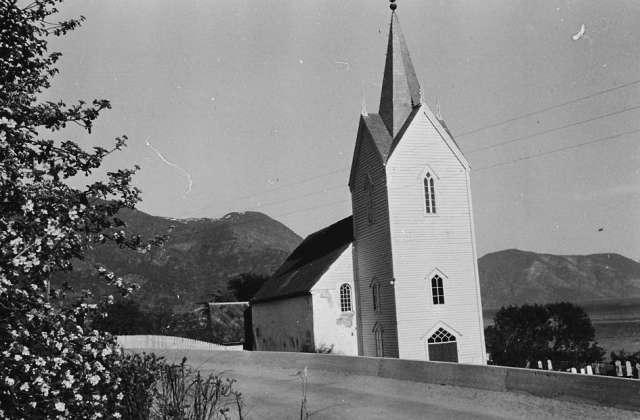
Old tower (pre-1950)

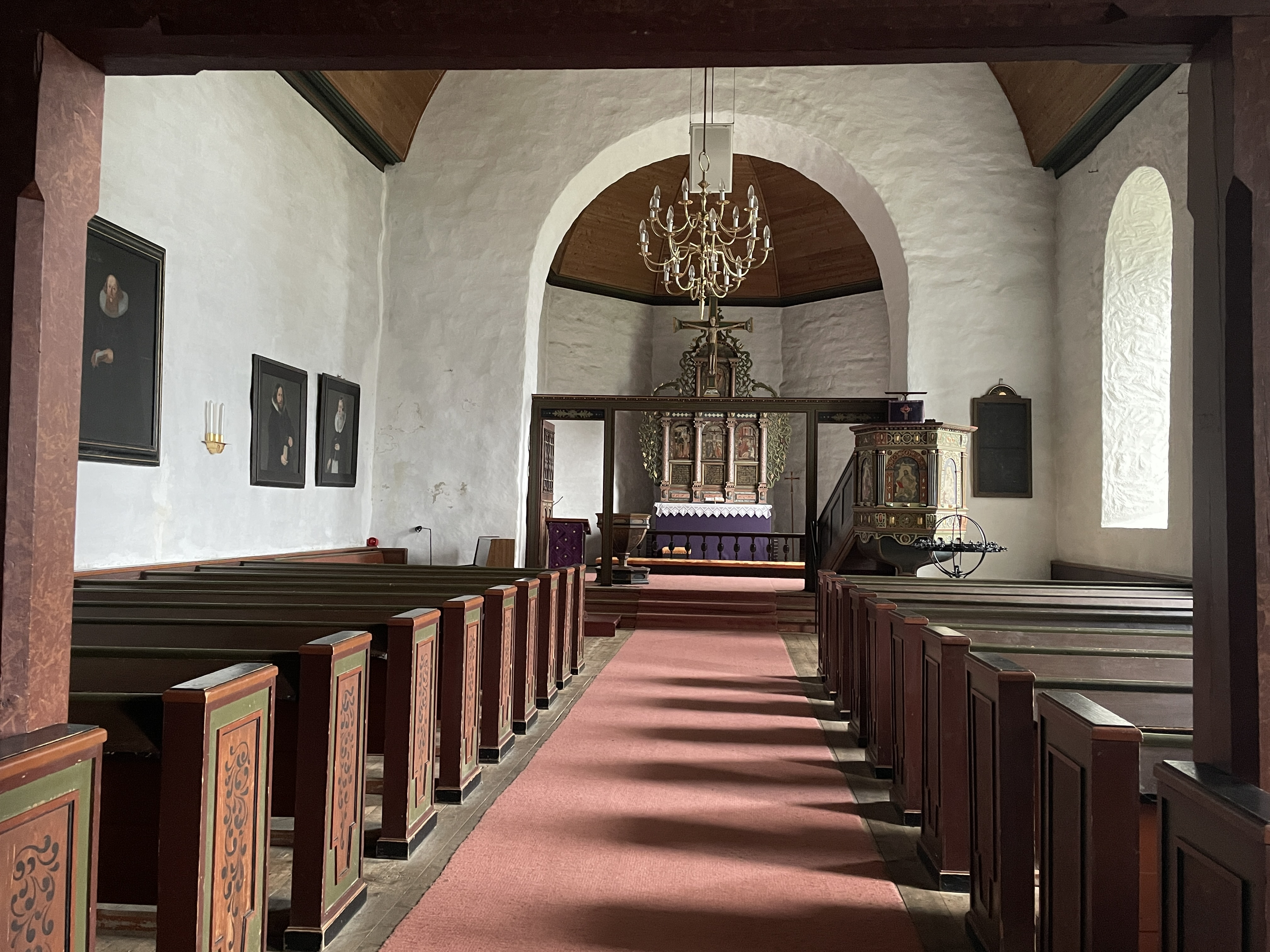

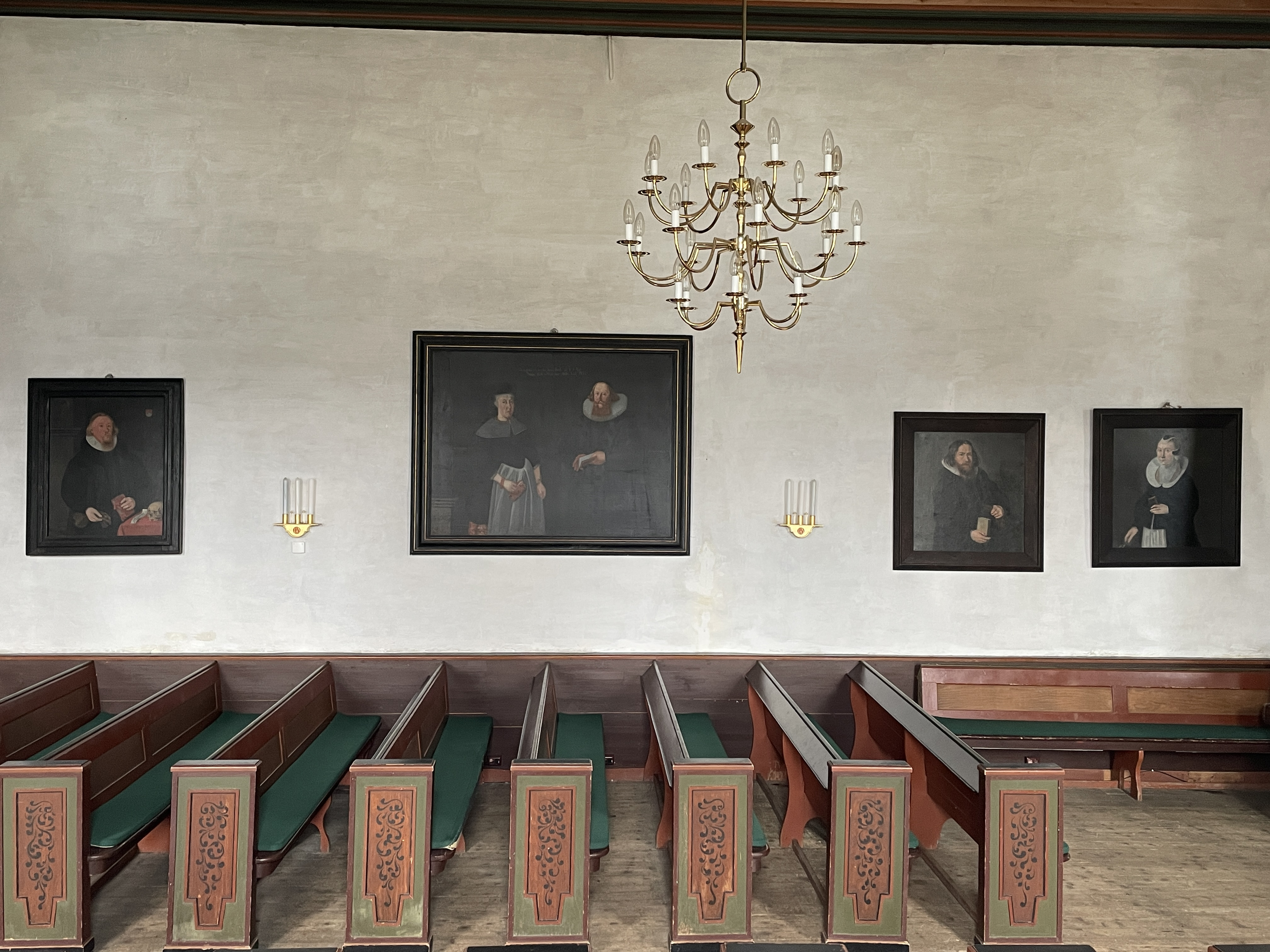

== See also ==
- List of churches in Bjørgvin
