= Georg Johan Sverdrup =

Norwegian professor

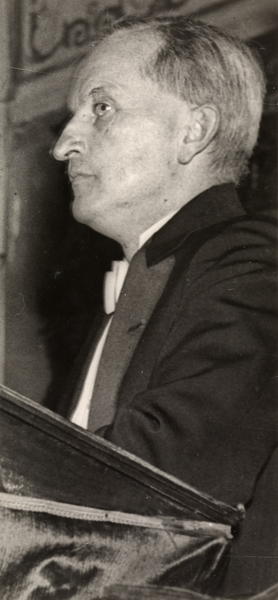
- Born: January 26, 1885; Stockholm, Sweden
- Died: November 4, 1951 (aged 66)
- Occupation: Religious scholar

Georg Johan Sverdrup (January 26, 1885 – November 4, 1951) was a professor of the history of religion.

== Life and family ==
Sverdrup was born in Stockholm; he was the son of the bishop and politician Jakob Sverdrup and the brother of the Germanic philology professor Jakob Sverdrup and the zoologist Aslaug Sverdrup Sømme. He was the father of the historian Jakob Sverdrup, who directed the Norwegian Nobel Institute, and the mathematician Erling Sverdrup. He was the nephew of the theologian Georg Sverdrup.

After graduation, he worked as an instructor and school principal in Molde and at the Tanks Upper Secondary School in Bergen. After the Second World War, he received a professorship in religious studies at the University of Oslo as the successor to Wilhelm Schencke.

== Bibliography ==
- Fra gravskikker til dødstro i nordisk stenalder (From Burial Customs to Religious Conceptions of Death in the Nordic Stone Age). Oslo: Dybwad, 1927
- Die Hausurnen und die Heiligkeit des Hauses (House Urns and the Sanctity of the House). Oslo: Dybwad, 1939
- Da Norge ble kristnet : En religionssosiologisk studie (When Norway Became Christian: A Religious Sociological Study). Oslo: Norli, 1942
