= Lutheran Free Church =

Defunct Christian denomination in the United States

- Abbreviation: LFC
- Classification: Lutheran
- Associations: National Lutheran Council
- Region: United States
- Origin: 1897
- Separations: Association of Free Lutheran Congregations (1962)
- Merged into: American Lutheran Church (1963)
- Congregations: 334 (1961)
- Members: 90,253 (1961)
- Ministers: 252 (1961)

The Lutheran Free Church (LFC) was a Lutheran denomination that existed in the United States, mainly in Minnesota and North Dakota, from 1897 until its merger into the American Lutheran Church (ALC) in 1963. The history of the church body predates its official organization, and a group of congregations that did not join the ALC formed the Association of Free Lutheran Congregations.

== Background ==
Georg Sverdrup and Sven Oftedal were two scholars from prominent Haugean families in Norway who came to Augsburg Seminary, now Augsburg University, in Minneapolis, Minnesota, to teach in the 1870s, bringing with them a radical view of Christian education that was centered on Scripture and the simple doctrines of Christianity. They believed that, according to the New Testament, the local congregation was the correct form of God's kingdom on earth. Their vision was for a church that promoted a “living” Christianity, emphasized an evangelism that would result in changed lives, and enabled the church member to exercise his/her spiritual gifts.

Augsburg was the seminary of the Conference of the Norwegian-Danish Evangelical Lutheran Church of America In 1890, the "Conference" joined with two other Lutheran church bodies to form the United Norwegian Lutheran Church of America (UNLC).

A dispute within the UNLC over which school, Augsburg or St. Olaf, should be the college of the church body led in 1893 to the creation of the Friends of Augsburg. By 1896, Sverdrup, Oftedal, and others felt their beliefs of a "free church in a free land" were being compromised and broke away from the UNLC, forming the Lutheran Free Church in 1897.

The LFC's publishing house was the Messenger Press and its official English language magazine was the Lutheran Messenger started in 1918. During most of its earlier history the church also published a Norwegian language publication named Folkebladet (the People's Paper).

In harmony with its emphasis on utilizing and developing the natural spiritual gifts of all the members of the Church, the LFC gave a freer rein to women within its church body to hold non-ordained ministries, offices, and responsibilities than many of its contemporary Lutheran counterparts. The LFC also strongly emphasized the importance of foreign missions (with missions fields in Madagascar and the Cameroons) and spent more of its financial resources on foreign missions and supported a larger number of foreign missionaries than many of its contemporary Lutheran church bodies of comparable size.

By the 1950s there was a growing movement by many Lutherans throughout the United States to merge smaller Lutheran bodies into larger ones. The Lutheran Free Church joined the American Lutheran Church on February 1, 1963, after votes were held in 1955, 1957, and 1961. In 1988 the ALC itself joined with other Lutheran churches to form the Evangelical Lutheran Church in America (ELCA). About 40 Lutheran Free Churches however did not join the ALC, instead forming the Association of Free Lutheran Congregations (AFLC) in October 1962. Today the AFLC has more than 250 congregations.

In 1963, just before its merger into the ALC, the LFC had 252 pastors, 334 congregations, and 90,253 members.

== Presidents of the LFC ==
Term of office: one year 1897–1920. Three years 1920–1963

Name	Term
Elias P. Harbo	1897–1899
Endre E. Gynild	1899–1901
Elias P. Harbo	1901–1903
Christopher K. Ytrehus	1903–1905
Endre E. Gynild	1905–1907
Elias P. Harbo	1907–1909
Endre E. Gynild	1909–1910
Paul Winther	1910–1912
Endre E. Gynild	1912–1914
Johan Mattson	1914–1916
Endre E. Gynild	1916–1918
Johan Mattson	1918–1920
Olai H. Sletten	1920–1923
Endre E. Gynild	1923–1928
Hans J. Urdahl	1928–1930
Thorvald O. Burntvedt	1930–1958
John Stensvaag	1958–1963

== Annual Conferences ==
- 1897 Minneapolis, Minnesota
- 1898 Minneapolis, Minnesota
- 1899 Dalton, Minnesota
- 1900 Montevideo, Minnesota
- 1901 Willmar, Minnesota
- 1902 Audubon, Minnesota
- 1903 Minneapolis, Minnesota
- 1904 Minneapolis, Minnesota
- 1905 Willmar, Minnesota
- 1906 Battle Lake, Minnesota
- 1907 Fargo, North Dakota
- 1908 Minneapolis, Minnesota
- 1909 Montevideo, Minnesota
- 1910 Valley City, North Dakota
- 1911 Willmar, Minnesota
- 1912 Thief River Falls, Minnesota
- 1913 Minneapolis, Minnesota
- 1914 Brainerd, Minnesota
- 1915 Marinette, Wisconsin
- 1916 Willmar, Minnesota
- 1917 Fargo, North Dakota
- 1918 Minneapolis, Minnesota
- 1919 Minneapolis, Minnesota
- 1920 Thief River Falls, Minnesota
- 1921 Minneapolis, Minnesota
- 1922 Fargo, North Dakota
- 1923 Minneapolis, Minnesota
- 1924 Northfield, Minnesota
- 1925 Minneapolis, Minnesota
- 1926 Willmar, Minnesota
- 1927 Fargo, North Dakota
- 1928 Minneapolis, Minnesota
- 1929 Thief River Falls, Minnesota
- 1930 Fergus Falls, Minnesota
- 1931 Fargo, North Dakota
- 1932 Minneapolis, Minnesota
- 1933 Willmar, Minnesota
- 1934 Duluth, Minnesota
- 1935 Minneapolis, Minnesota
- 1936 Fargo, North Dakota
- 1937 Minneapolis, Minnesota
- 1938 Thief River Falls, Minnesota
- 1939 Minneapolis, Minnesota
- 1940 La Crosse, Wisconsin
- 1941 Morris, Minnesota
- 1942 Fargo, North Dakota
- 1943 Minneapolis, Minnesota
- 1944 Willmar, Minnesota
- 1945 Minneapolis, Minnesota
- 1946 Fargo, North Dakota
- 1947 Minneapolis, Minnesota
- 1948 Willmar, Minnesota
- 1949 Morris, Minnesota
- 1950 Minneapolis, Minnesota
- 1951 Seattle, Washington
- 1952 Fargo, North Dakota
- 1953 Minneapolis, Minnesota
- 1954 Thief River Falls, Minnesota
- 1955 Minneapolis, Minnesota
- 1956 Fargo, North Dakota
- 1957 Minneapolis, Minnesota
- 1958 Minneapolis, Minnesota
- 1959 Minot, North Dakota
- 1960 Fargo, North Dakota
- 1961 Minneapolis, Minnesota
- 1962 Minneapolis, Minnesota

== Other sources ==
- Clarence J. Carlsen, The Years of Our Church (Minneapolis, MN: The Lutheran Free Church Publishing Company, 1942)
- Eugene L. Fevold, The Lutheran Free Church: A Fellowship of American Lutheran Congregations 1897-1963 (Minneapolis, MN: Augsburg Publishing House, 1969)
- Aarflot, Andreas Hans Nielsen Hauge, his life and message (Augsburg Publishing House, Minneapolis, MN. 1979)
- Hamre, James S. Georg Sverdrup: Educator, Theologian, Churchman (Northfield, MN: Norwegian-American Historical Association. 1986)
- Loiell Dyrud, The Quest for Freedom: The Lutheran Free Church to The Association of Free Lutheran Congregations (Minneapolis, MN: Ambassador Publications, 2000)
- Augsburg College- The Lutheran Free Church. CLiC Digital Collections.
