= Christian S. Oftedal =

Norwegian politician (1907–1955)

Christian Stephansen Oftedal (14 January 1907 – 11 July 1955) was a Norwegian politician for the Liberal Party. He is the son of Lars Oftedal.

He was born in Stavanger.

He was elected to the Norwegian Parliament from the Market towns of Vest-Agder and Rogaland counties in 1945, but was not re-elected in 1949. He was also a member of the executive committee of Stavanger municipality council in 1937–1940.

He was editor-in-chief of Stavanger Aftenblad from 1932 to 1940 and 1945 to 1955. In the period 1940–1945 he was under Nazi Zuchthaus imprisonment. He published a number of books about this and other issues. He was also a member of the Norwegian Nobel Committee in 1945 and again in 1946–1948.
