= Harald Ulrik Sverdrup (politician) =

Norwegian politician

Mayor of Balestrand Municipality
- In office 1849–1879

Member of Parliament
- In office 1851–1870

Member of Parliament
- In office 1874–1878

Personal details
- Born: 18 February 1813 Jarlsberg Manor in Vestfold
- Died: 23 April 1891 (aged 78)
- Party: Independent
- Relations: Johan Sverdrup (brother); Harald Ulrik Sverdrup, Jr. (grandson)
- Children: Jakob Sverdrup, Edvard Sverdrup, Georg Sverdrup
- Profession: Vicar, entrepreneur

Harald Ulrik Sverdrup (18 February 1813 – 23 April 1891) was a Norwegian priest and politician who was a member of Parliament and mayor of Balestrand Municipality.

== Biography ==
He was born at Jarlsberg Manor in Vestfold. His brother Johan Sverdrup would found the Liberal Party and become Prime Minister of Norway in 1884.

He graduated as cand.theol. in 1837, and worked as a senior technical officer (amanuensis) at the University Library of Oslo from 1837 to 1845. In 1845 he was appointed to a clerical position, that of chaplain at Leikanger Church. In 1849 the district of Balestrand was separated from Leikanger as an own parish, and Sverdrup became vicar (sogneprest) of the new parish. He published several works, mostly based on Erik Pontoppidan's explanation of the Luther's Small Catechism.

As his brother, Harald Ulrik Sverdrup became involved in politics. When Balestrand Municipality was established in 1850, Sverdrup became its first mayor. He sat as mayor until 1879. He was among the establishers of the local savings bank in 1847, and of the transport company Nordre Bergenhus Amts Dampskibe (later: Fylkesbaatane i Sogn og Fjordane) with Jan Henrik Nitter Hansen and Michael Aubert in 1858.

He was elected to the Norwegian Parliament in 1851, representing the constituency of Nordre Bergenhus Amt. He was re-elected in 1854, 1857, 1859, 1862, 1865 and 1868. In 1870 he lost the election due to disagreements with Søren Jaabæk and his supporters, but Sverdrup later returned for a final term from 1874. Harald Ulrik Sverdrup stepped down as a priest in 1883.

When he stepped down, his son Jakob Sverdrup stood for election, and won. He also became a government minister.

A daughter of Harald Ulrik Sverdrup married the priest and Nynorsk proponent Eirik Olson Bruhjell. They had met while Sverdrup was the private tutor of Bruhjell. Another of his sons, Edvard Sverdrup, became a professor of theology. One of Edvard's sons, Harald Ulrik Sverdrup, Jr., went on to become a well-known oceanographer and meteorologist.
