= Stavanger Aftenblad =

Norwegian daily newspaper

- Type: Daily newspaper
- Format: Tabloid
- Owner: Schibsted
- Founder: Lars Oftedal
- Founded: 1893
- Political alignment: Christian-conservative
- Language: Norwegian
- Headquarters: Stavanger

Stavanger Aftenblad (OSE: STA; lit. 'Stavanger Evening Paper') or simply Aftenbladet is a daily newspaper based in Stavanger, Norway, and owned by Schibsted Media Group.

Norwegian owners held 42 percent of the shares in Schibsted at the end of 2015. Stavanger Aftenblad is thus majority foreign-owned.

== History and profile ==
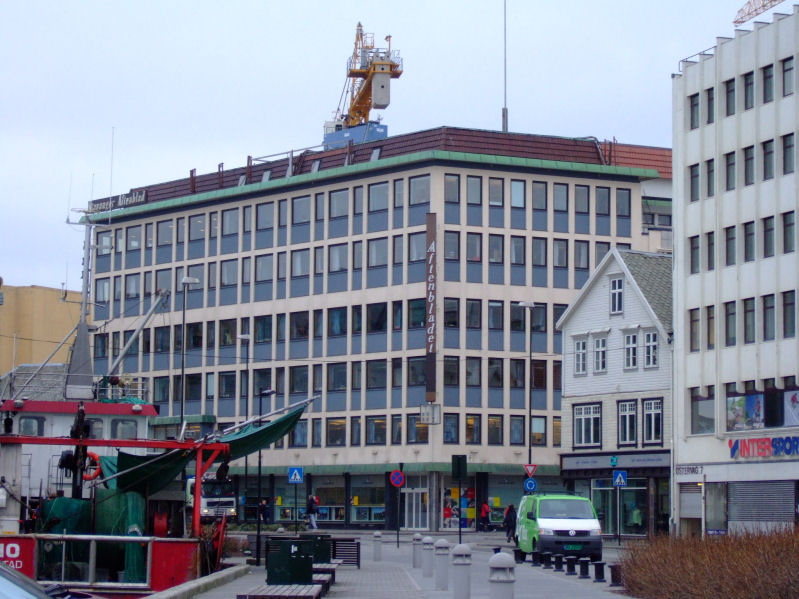
Stavanger Aftenblad former building in Stavanger

Stavanger Aftenblad was founded in 1893 by the priest Lars Oftedal, and was for a long period a publication for the Norwegian Liberal Party. The paper is based in Stavanger and is owned by the Media Norge, a subsidiary of the Schibsted company.

The online version of Stavanger Aftenblad had an English news service, aimed at the English speaking foreign community in Norway who were not fluent in the language, and international audiences interested in Norway. The English service closed in January 2009 due to the 2008 financial crisis.

The circulation of Stavanger Aftenblad was 70,000 copies in 2003. The paper had a circulation of 68,186 copies in 2005. Its circulation was 65,500 copies in 2009.

== See also ==
- List of non-English newspapers with English language subsections
