= Georg Sverdrup (theologian) =

Norwegian-American theologian (1848 – 1907)

Georg Sverdrup (December 16, 1848 – May 3, 1907) was a Norwegian-American Lutheran theologian and an educator.

== Background ==
He was born at Balestrand in Nordre Bergenhus county, Norway to Karoline Metella Suur and Harald Ulrik Sverdrup, a member of the Norwegian Parliament, whose brother Johan Sverdrup was Prime Minister of Norway between 1884 and 1889.

He attended the Hartvig Nissens skole in Christiania and later graduated from the University of Christiania in theology in the year of 1871, having studied under Gisle Johnson. Moving to France, he was educated in Semitics at the University of Paris and befriended Sven Oftedal before traveling to Germany to study at several other universities.

== Career ==
Two years later, Sverdrup was appointed as the president of the Seminary.

Emphasizing the freedom of the local congregation, together with Sven Oftedal, he founded the Lutheran Free Church in 1897. He also served as the President of Augsburg until his death in 1907. Apart from his teachings, Sverdrup became joint editor to the Theologisk Kvartalskrift (1875–1877; sole editor until 1881), of the weekly church magazine Lutheraneren (1885–1890), later renamed as Luthersk Kirkeblad (1890–1894) and editor of the monthly magazine Gasseren (1900–1907). Many of his writings are published in a six-volume set edited by Andreas Helland.

=== Views ===
Sverdrup was raised in the Norwegian State Church and educated in Lutheran theology. However, he declined to become a minister, serving rather as a Professor at Augsburg Seminary. He was member of the Norwegian Lutheran Conference which existed between 1869 and 1890. Sverdrup believed that the congregation was "the right form of the kingdom of God on earth". He had become concerned with the role and influence of the hierarchy within the church as well as their understanding of the Bible. His beliefs resulted in his participation in the formation of the Lutheran Free Church in 1897.

== Personal life ==
Sverdrup married Katherine Elisabet Heiberg in 1874, with whom he had five children. Three years after her death, Sverdrup married Katherine's sister, with whom he had two children. His son George Sverdrup later also served as President of Augsburg College.

== Other sources ==
- Hamre, James S. (1986) Georg Sverdrup: Educator, Theologian, Churchman (Northfield, Minn: Norwegian-American Historical Association)
- Helland, Andreas (1947) Georg Sverdrup, the Man and His Message 1848–1907 : A Biographical Sketch (Minneapolis, MN)
- Tavuchis, Nicholas (2013) Pastors and Immigrants: The Role of a Religious Elite in the Absorption of Norwegian Immigrants (Springer Publishing Company) ISBN 9789401760560
