= Mathiassen =

Mathiassen is a surname and given name. Notable people with the surname include:

- Erik Mathiassen Enge (1852–1933), Norwegian politician
- Samuel Mathiassen Føyn (1786–1854), Norwegian ship-owner and politician
- Idar Mathiassen (born 1976), Norwegian footballer
- Therkel Mathiassen (1892–1967), Danish archaeologist, anthropologist, cartographer and ethnographer
- Gotskalk Mathiassen Seim (1818–1873), Norwegian politician

== See also ==
- Mathiassen Mountain, on Southampton Island in the Canadian territory of Nunavut
