= Dugstad =

Dugstad is a Norwegian surname. Notable people with the surname include:

- Bodil Skjånes Dugstad (1927–2021), Norwegian politician
- Erik Dugstad (born 1973), Norwegian business leader
- Mathias Dugstad (1844–1929), Norwegian farmer and politician
