= Solveig Lund =

Norwegian photographer (1868–1943)

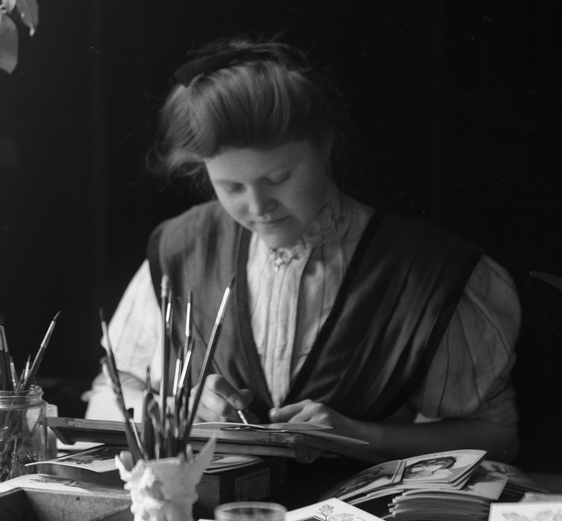
- Born: 15 April 1868; Christiania
- Died: 4 October 1943 (aged 75); Oslo
- Occupation: Photographer

Solveig Lund (15 April 1868 – 4 October 1943) was a Norwegian photographer.

== Early life ==
Solveig Lund was born on 15 April 1868 in Christiania. She was one of six children of Carl Cornelius Clarin Lund (1824–1906), a customs clerk, and Nilsine Othilia Føyn (1827–1895) and was the granddaughter of Samuel Mathiassen Føyn.

== Career ==
Lund trained under photographer Jens Petersen in Copenhagen and established her own studio in Moss in 1892. She later opened a studio in Christiania and worked in Bergen. She appears to have abandoned photography in 1906 and from then on worked hand-coloring her earlier photographs and postcards.

Lund's photography focused on women wearing bunad (traditional Norwegian dress), including many with women wearing bridal crowns. These were reproduced and distributed extensively as postcards.

Solveig Lund died on 4 October 1943.

== Gallery of photographs by Solveig Lund ==
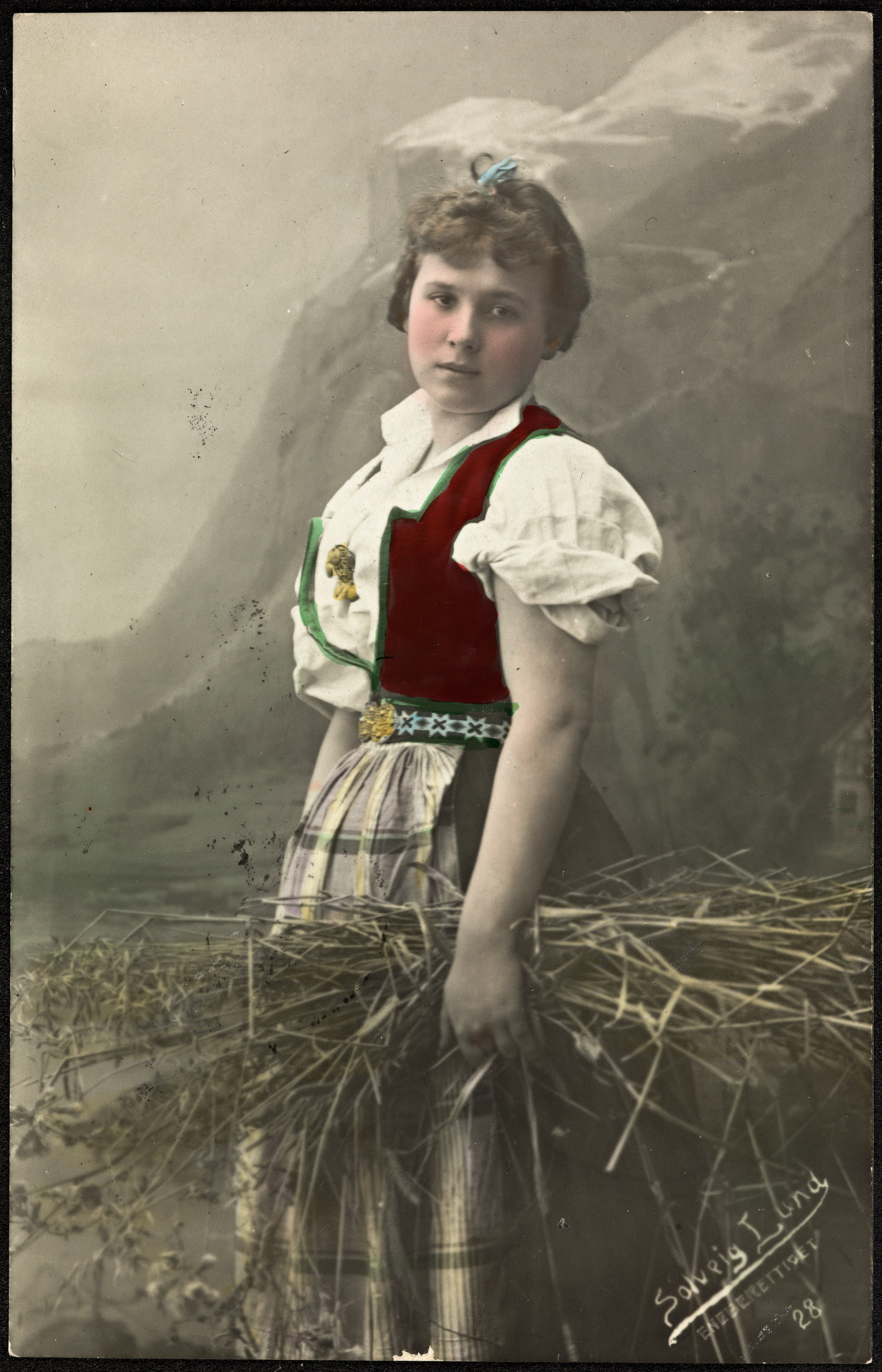
Woman in national costume c. 1909

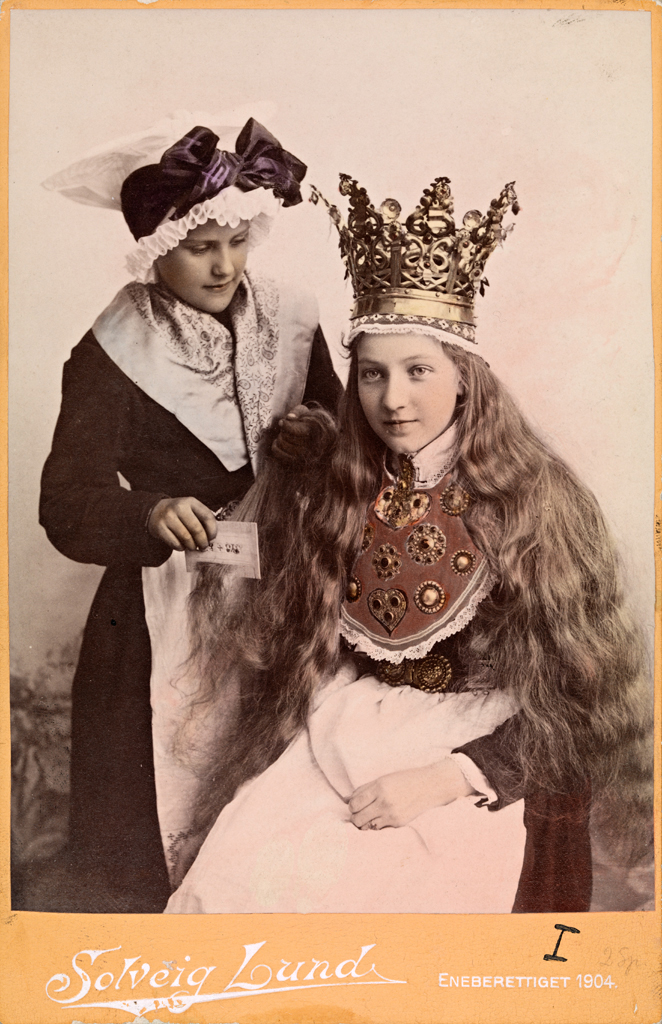
Brud fra Hardanger og kone fra Sogn, 1904

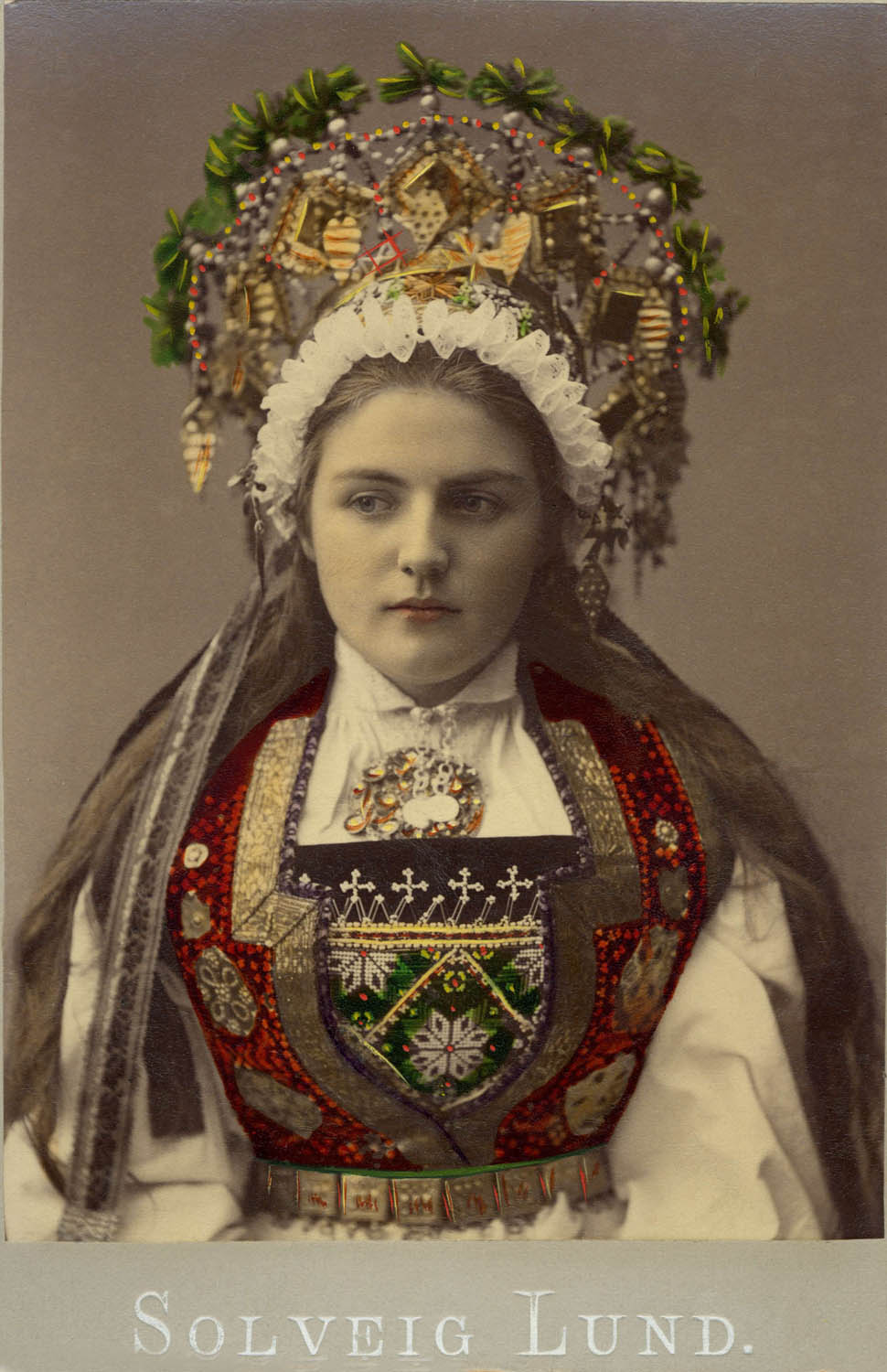
En brud från Hardanger, Norge

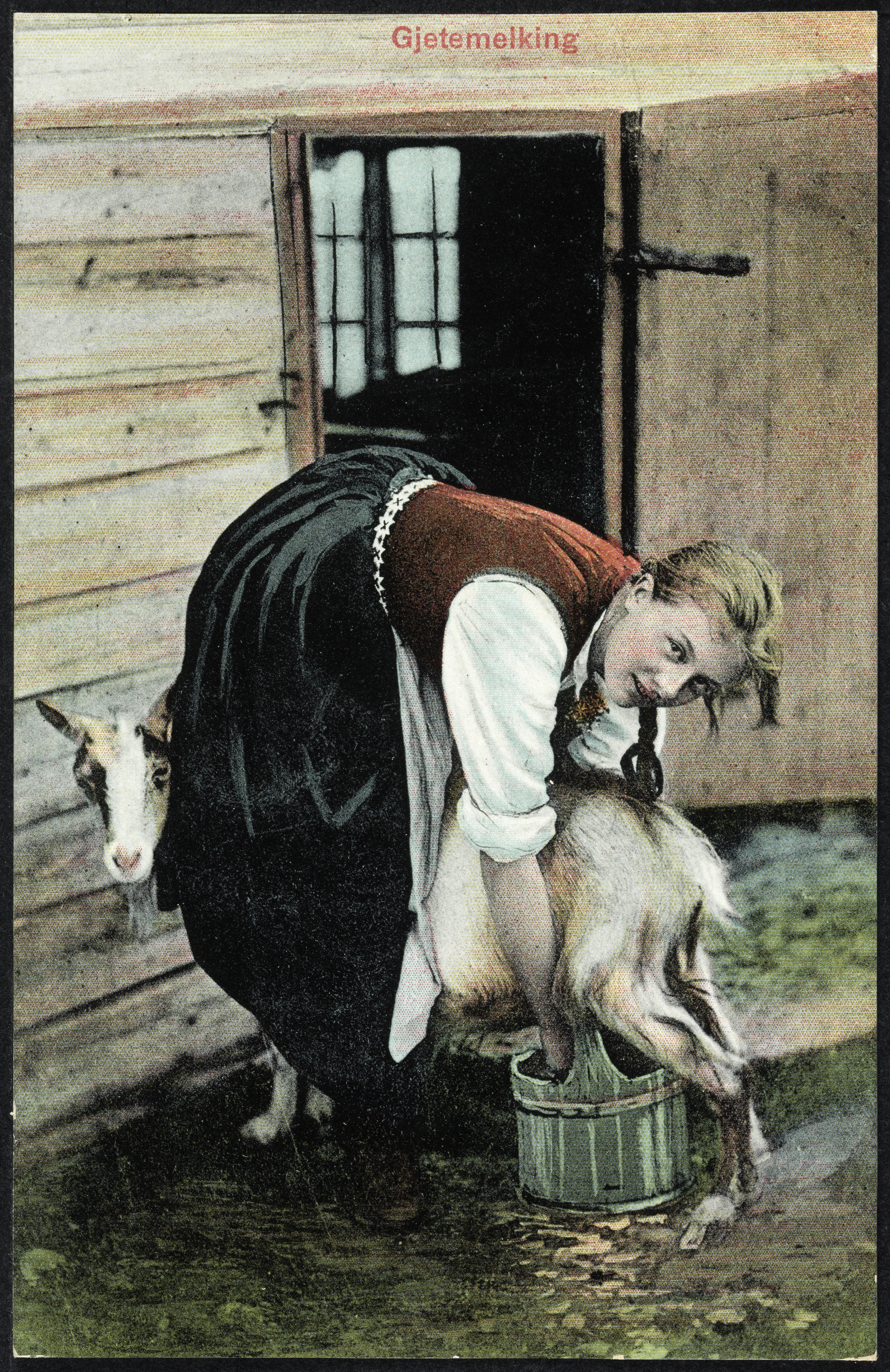
Gjetemelking

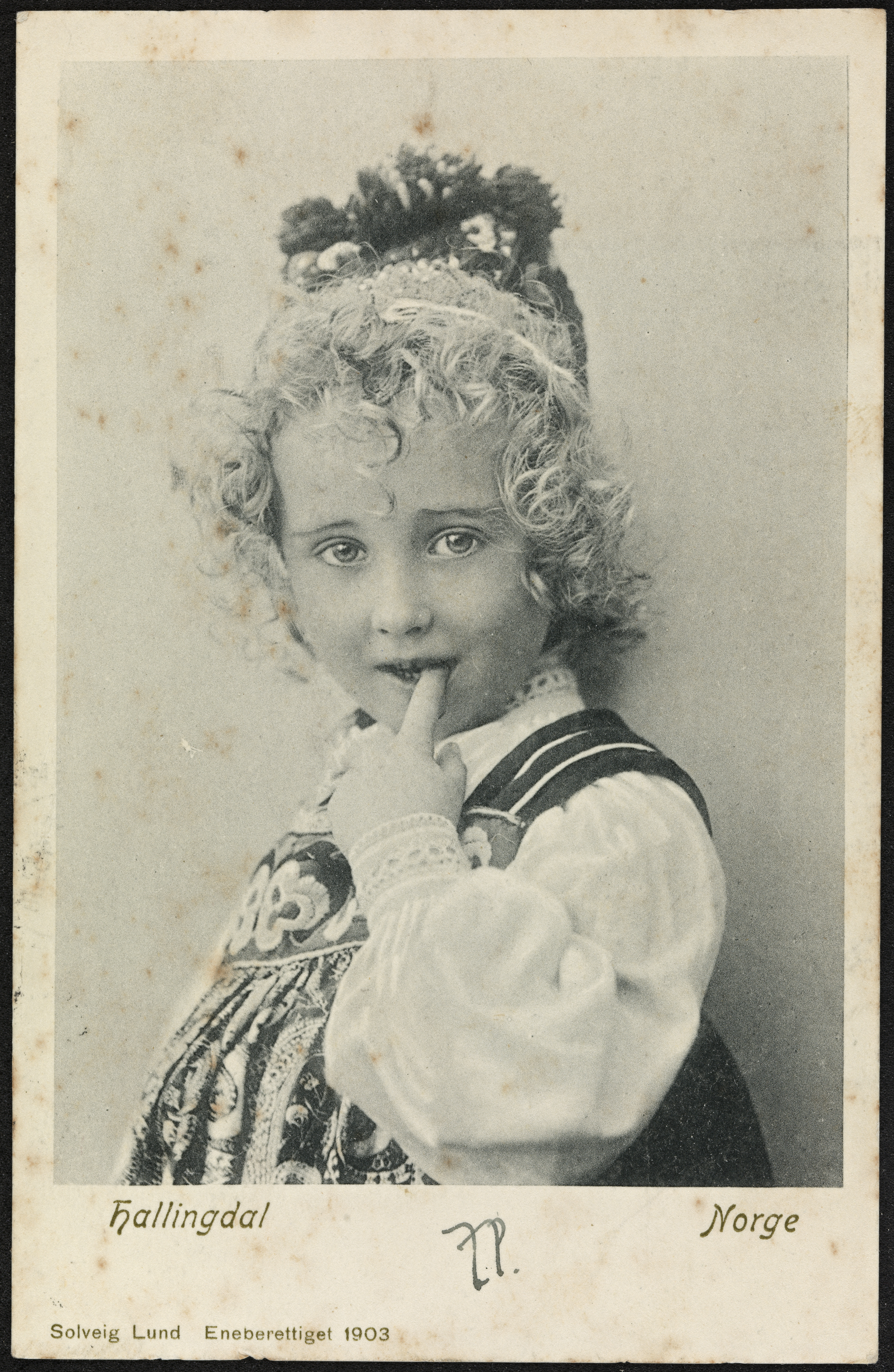
Hallingdal. Norge

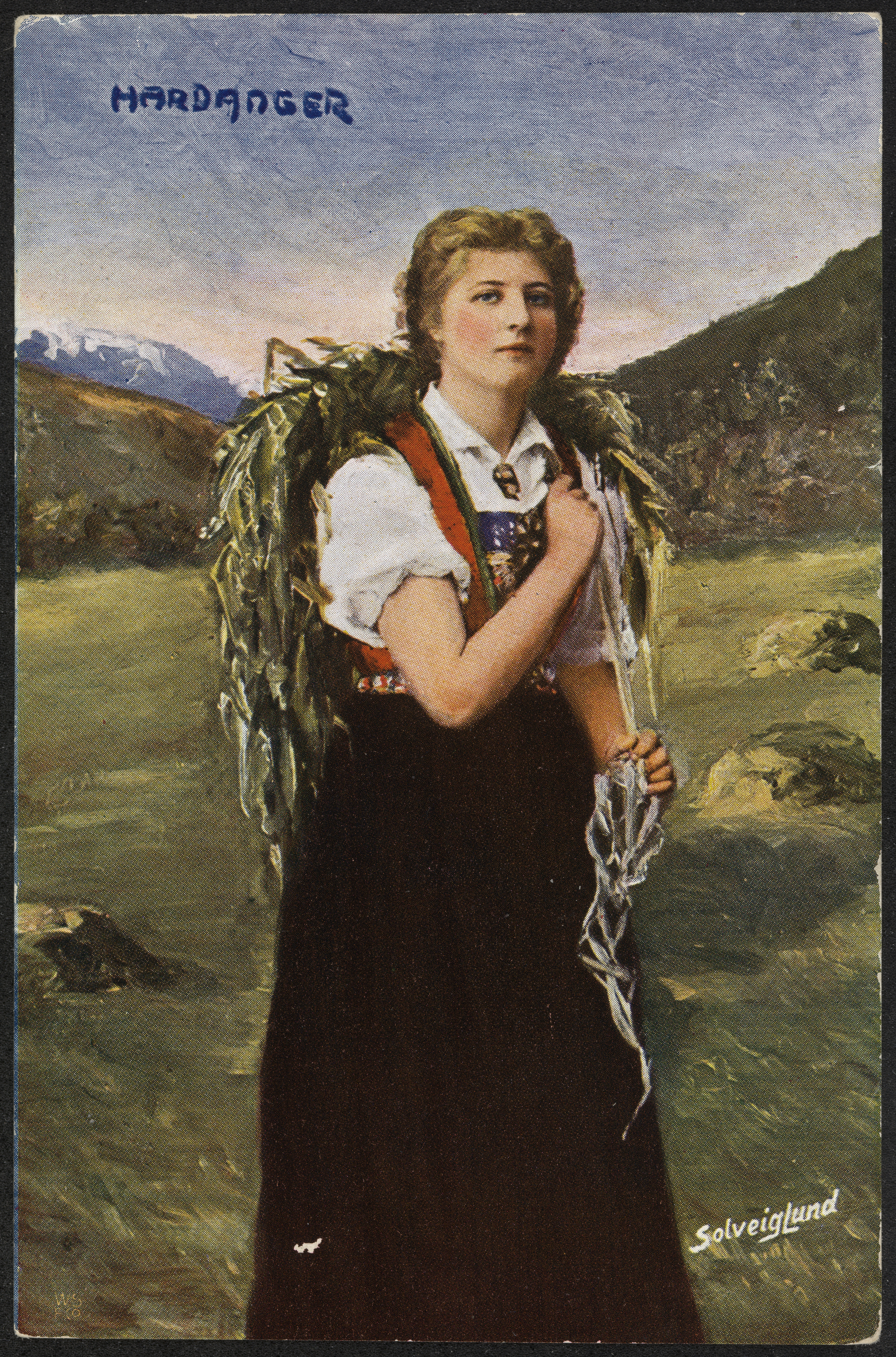
Hardanger

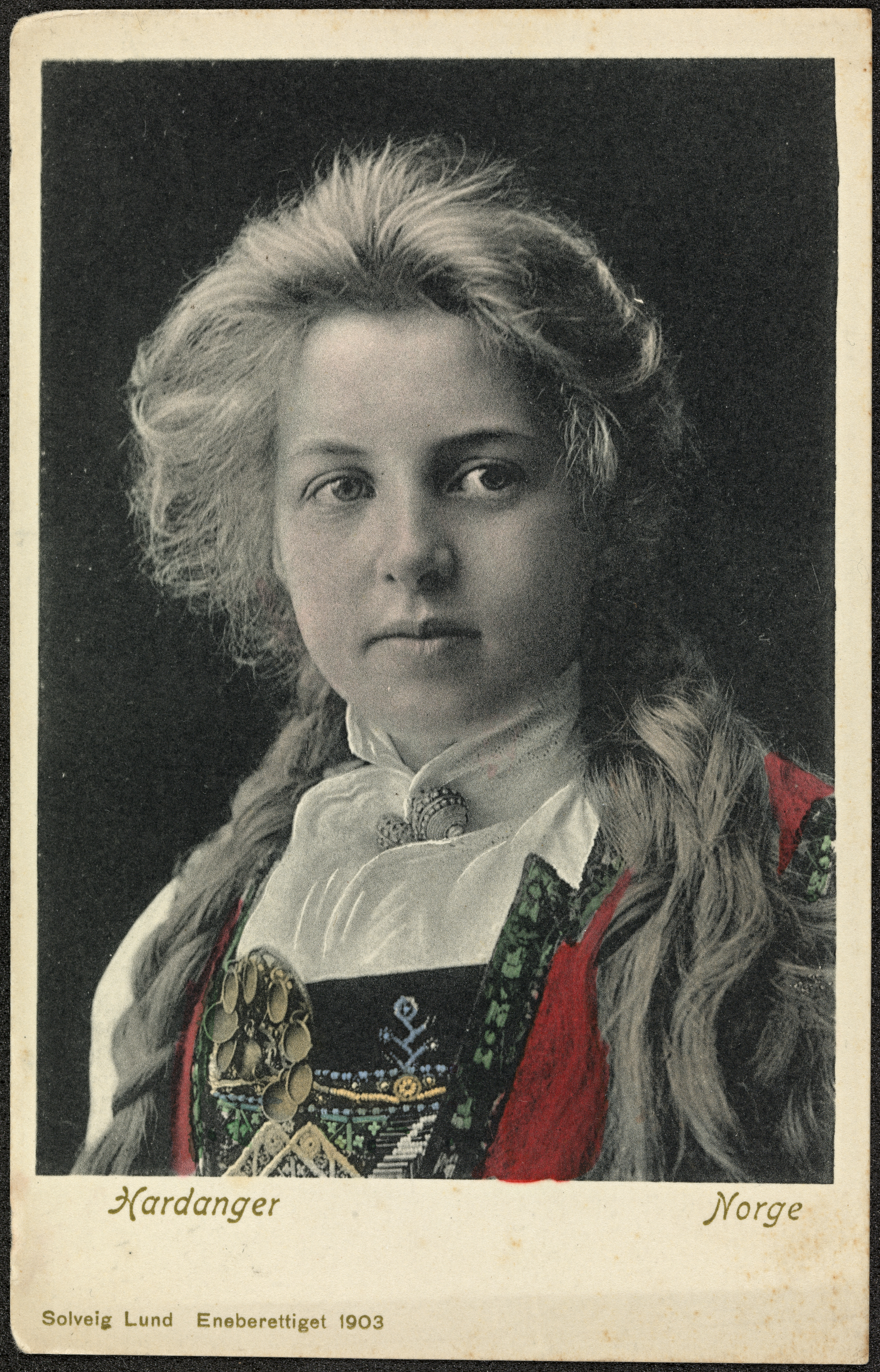
Hardanger. Norge

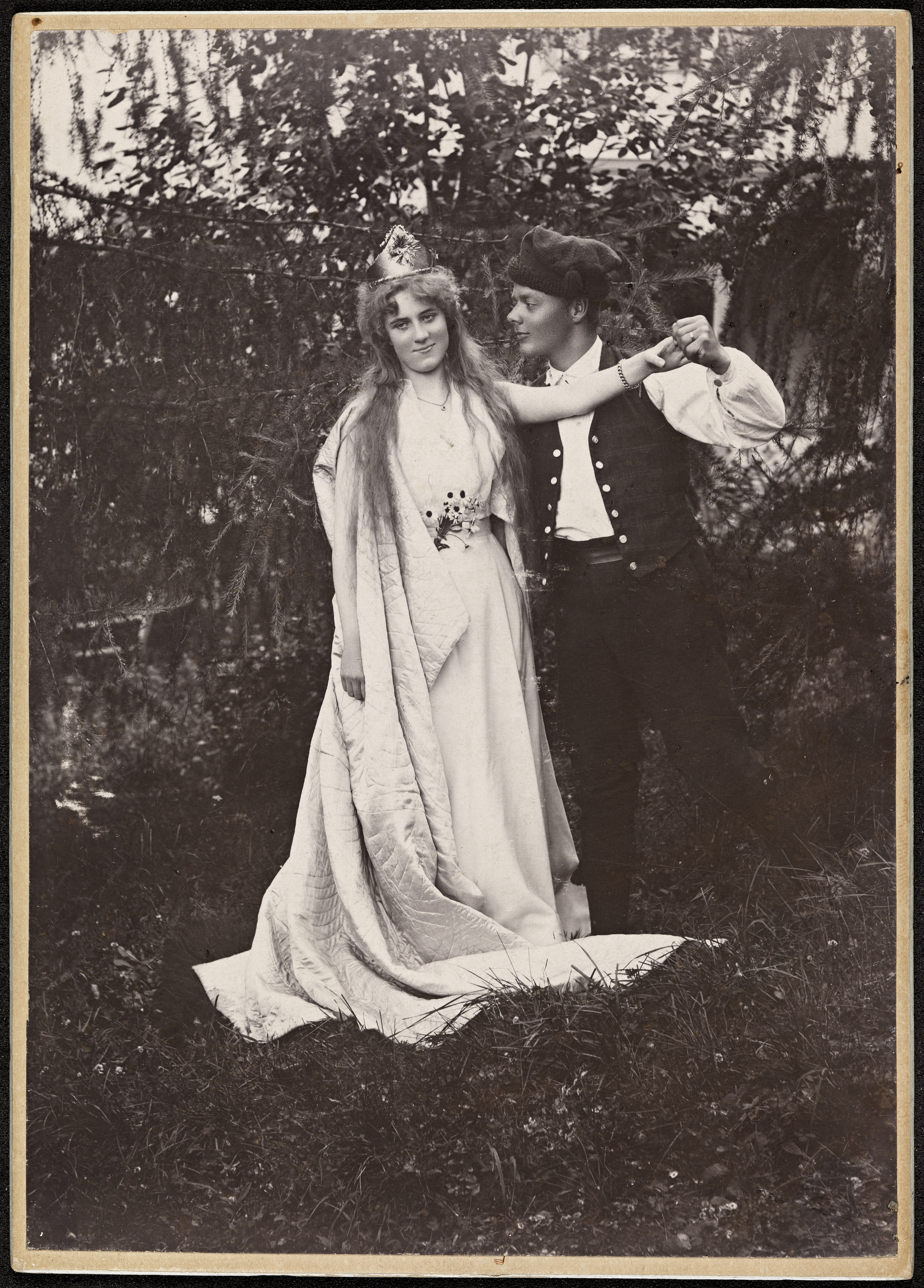
Iscenesatt romantisk situasjon

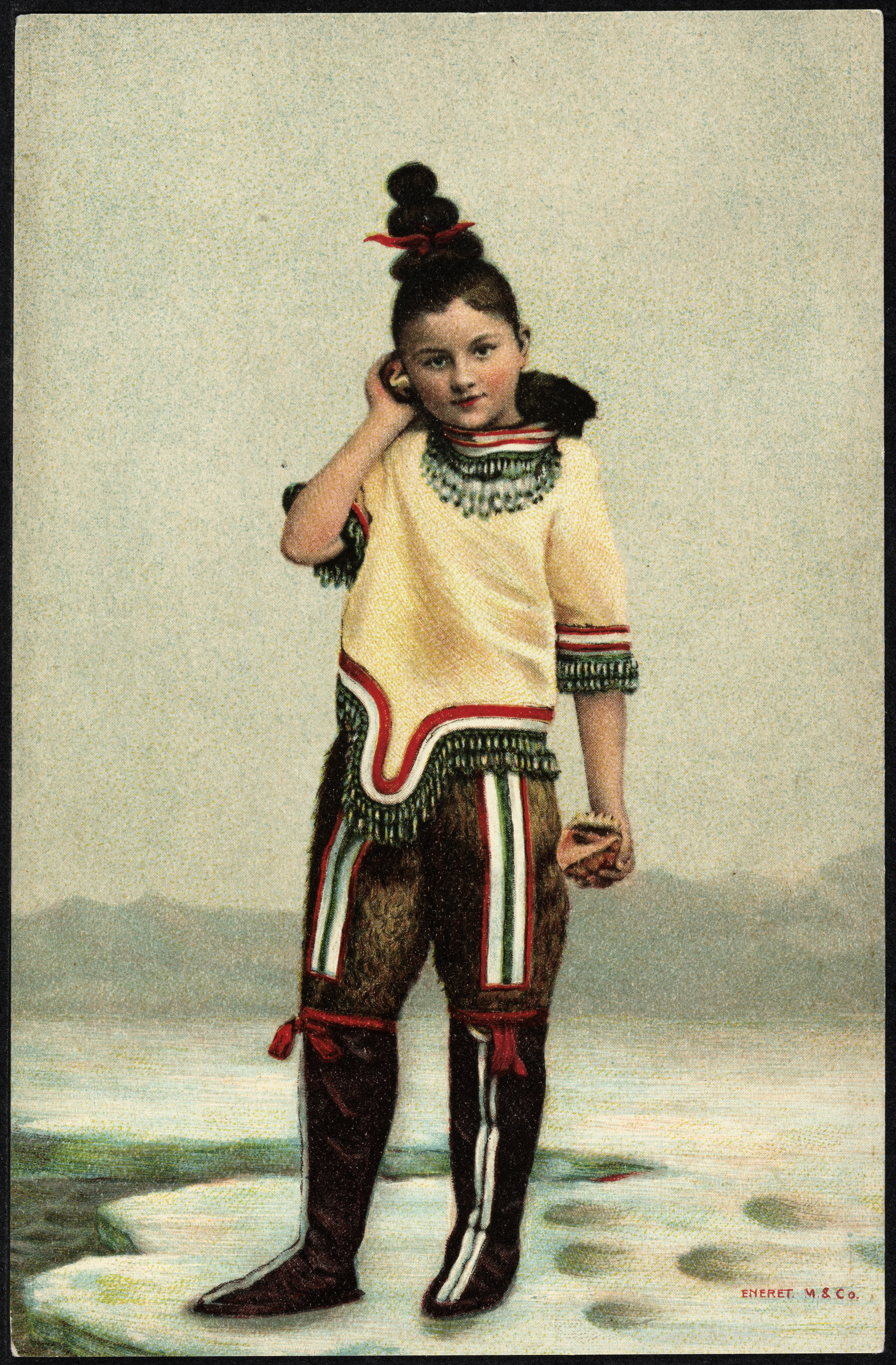
Jente i inuitliknende drakt

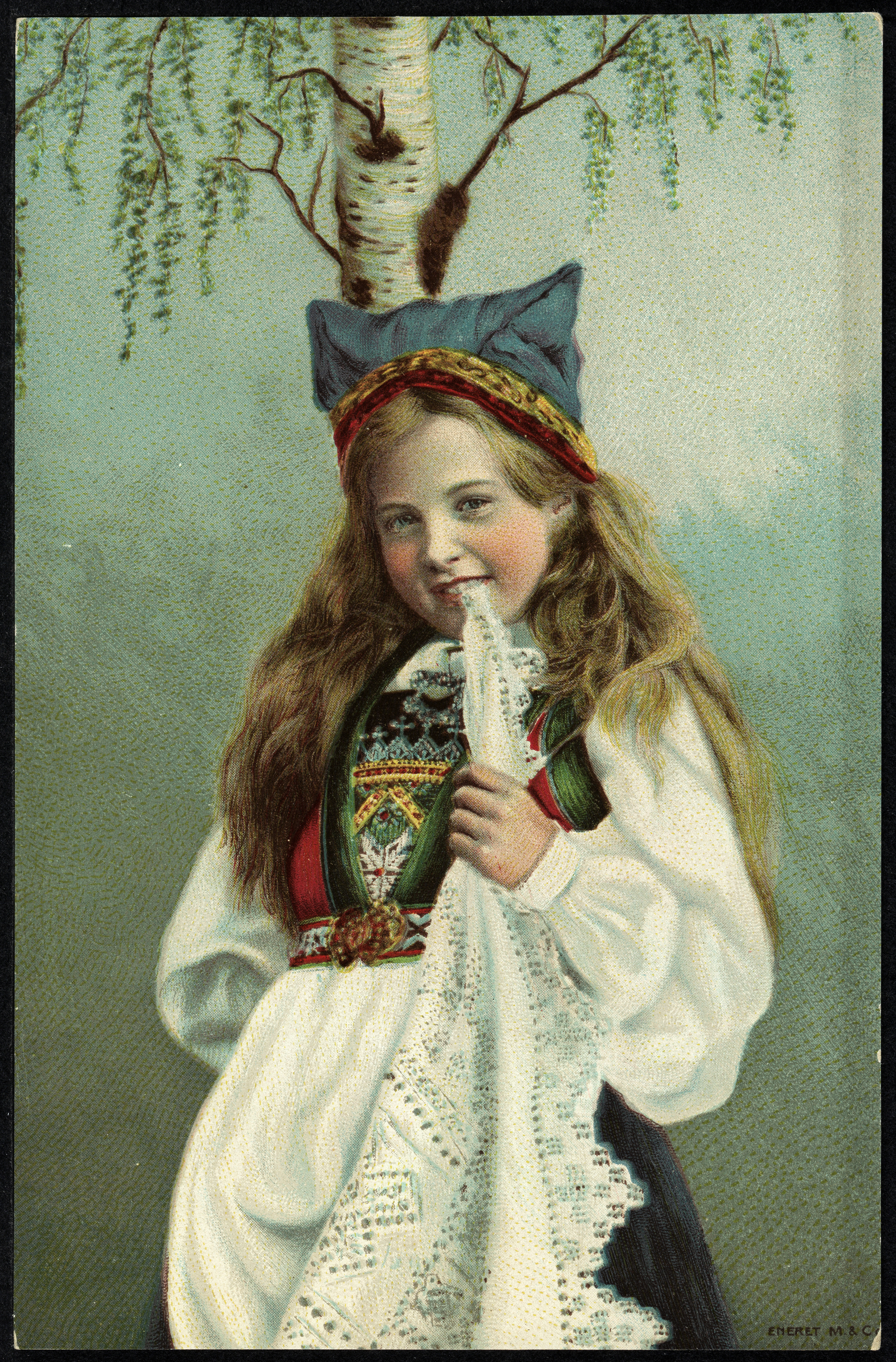
Jente i nasjonaldrakt

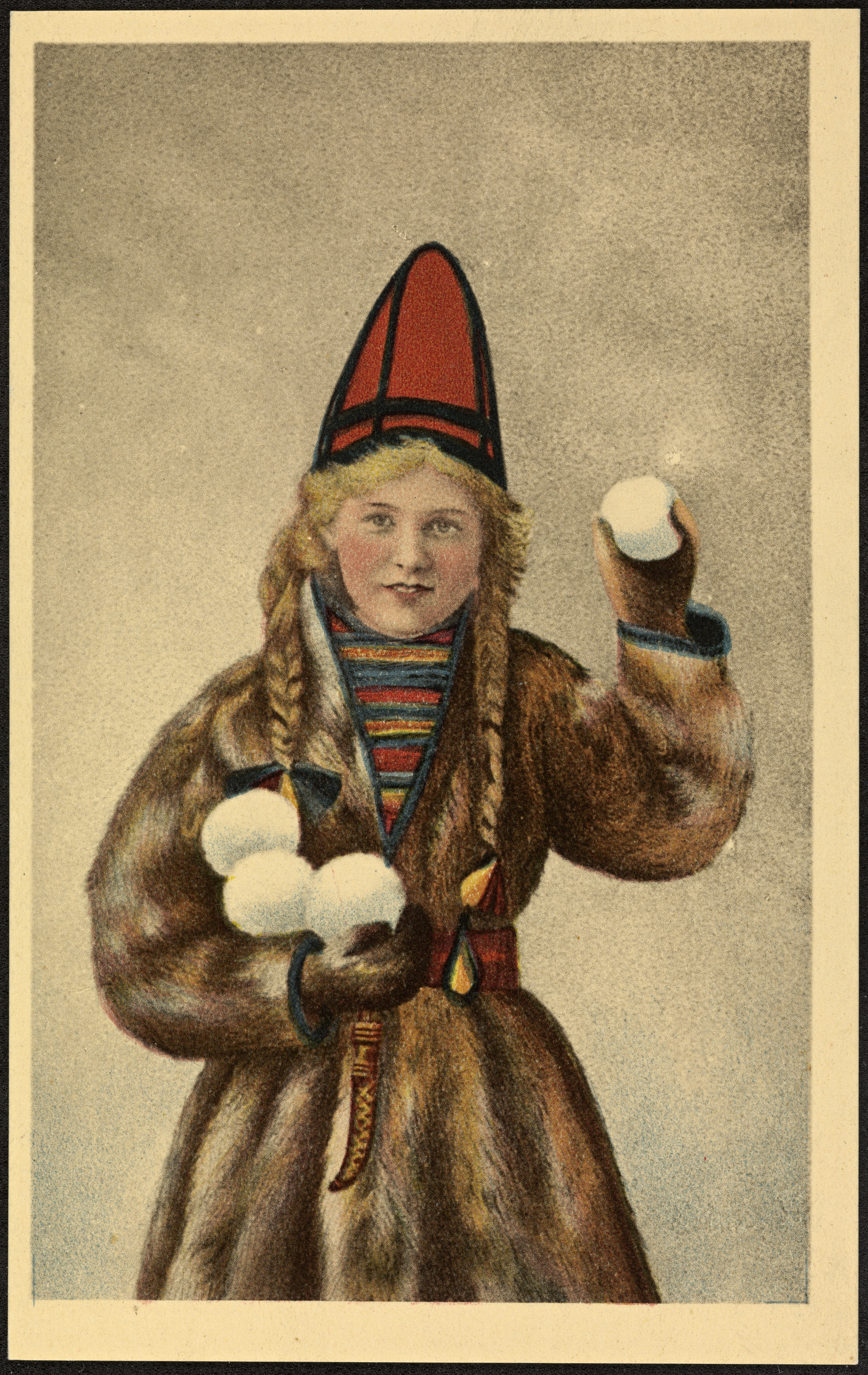
Jente i samelignende drakt - Girl in Sami costume

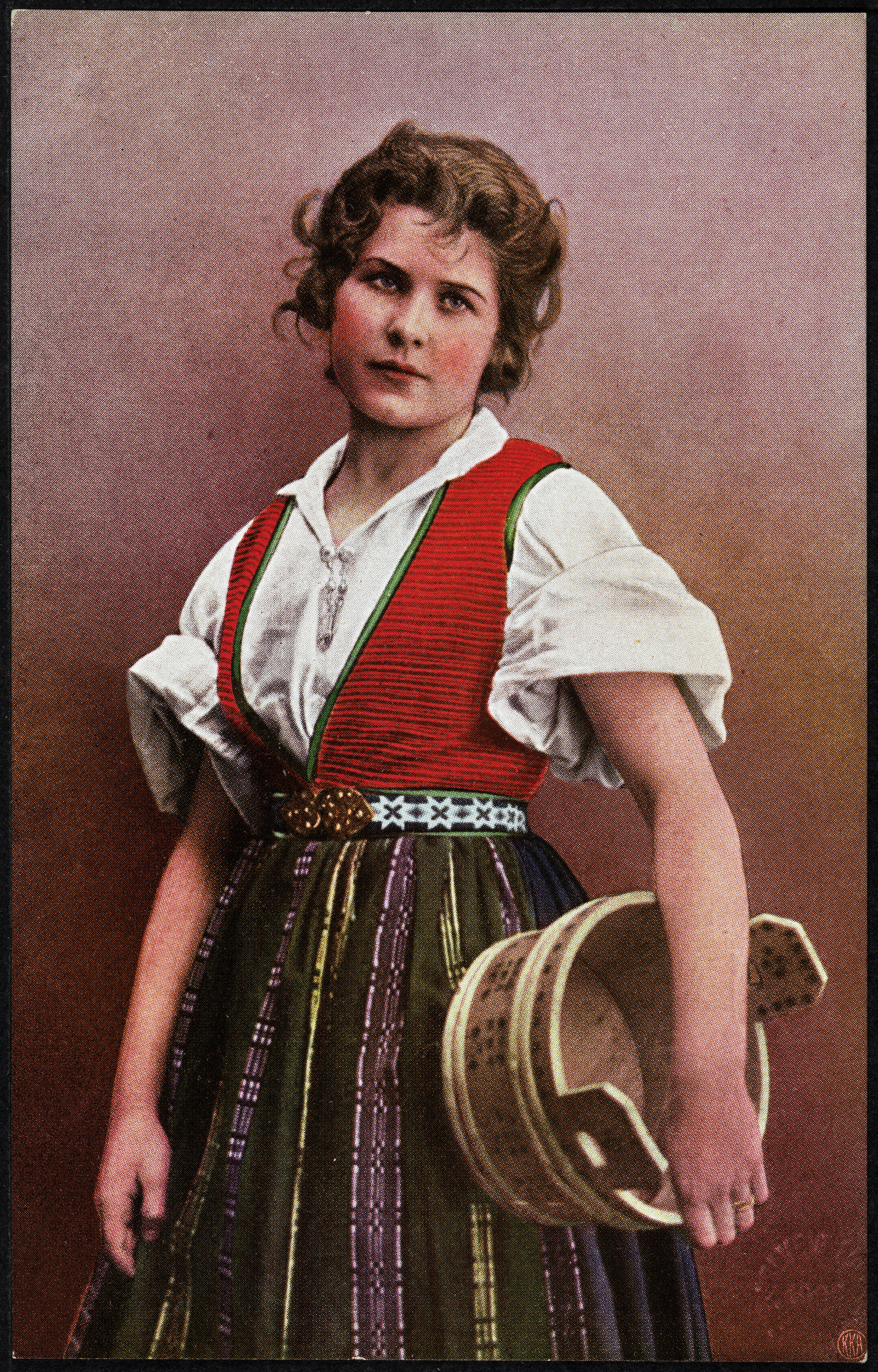
Kvinne i nasjonaldrakt holder en tine under armen

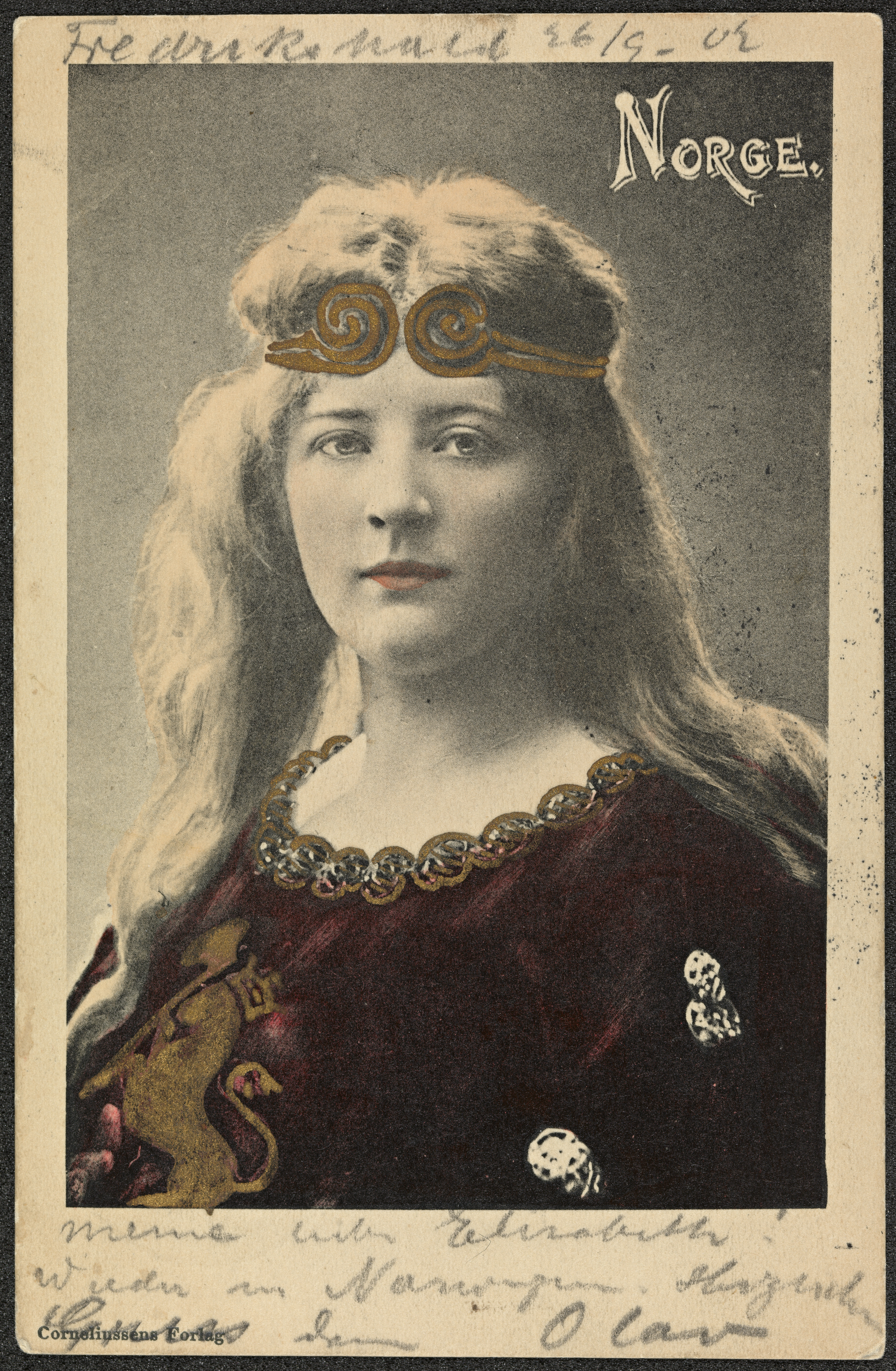
Norge

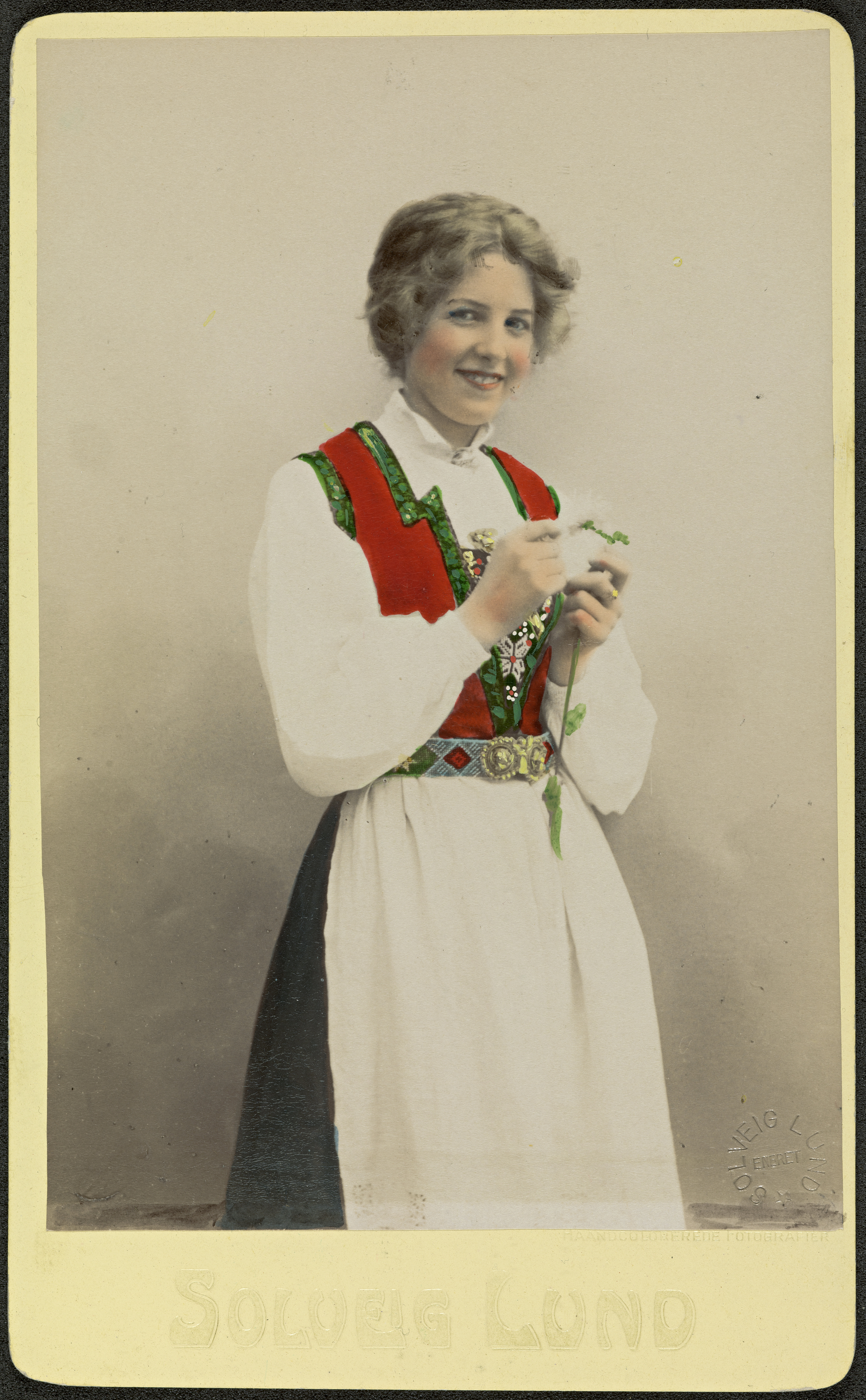
Studioportrett av uidentifisert kvinne i bunad

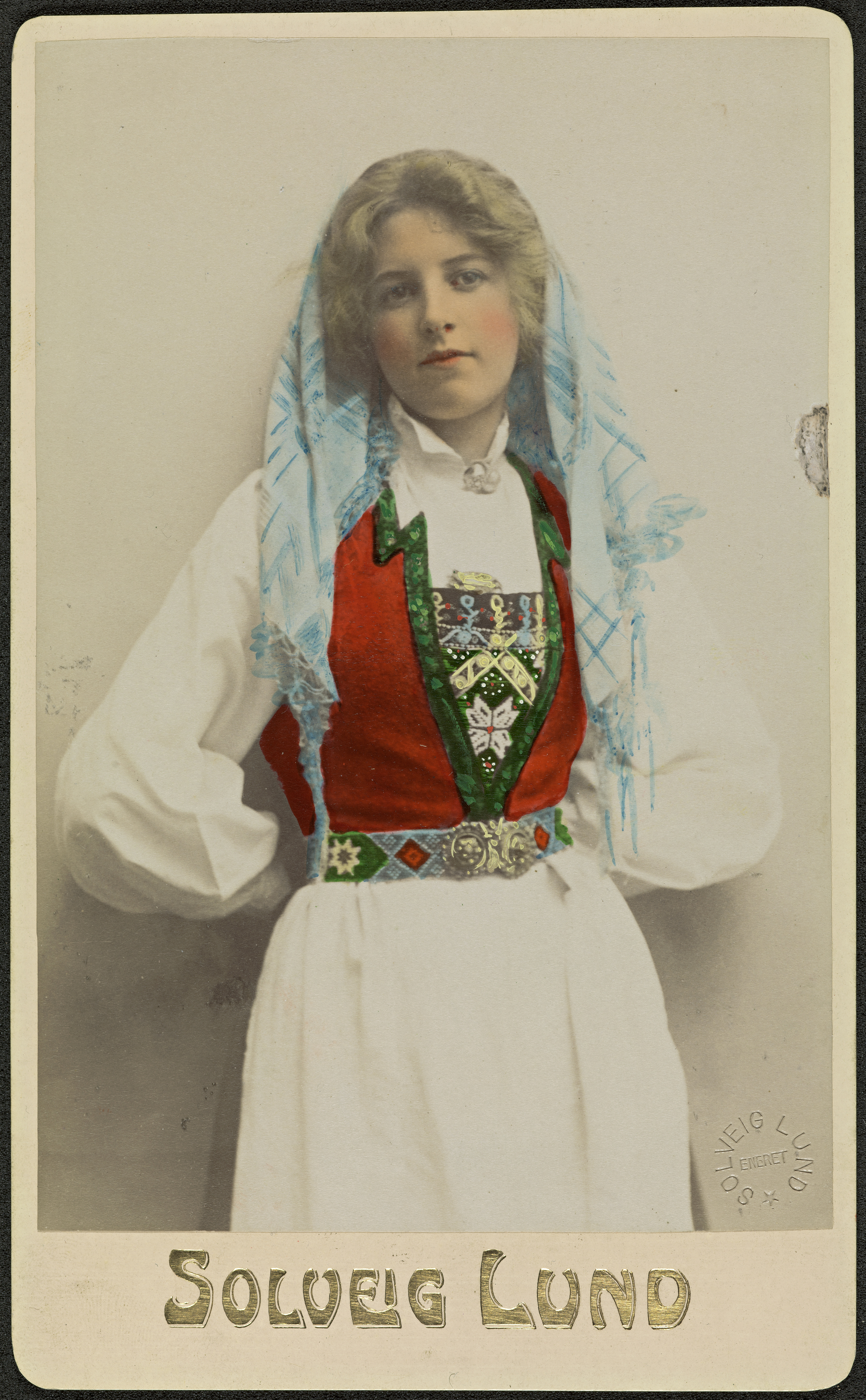
Studioportrett av uidentifisert kvinne i bunad

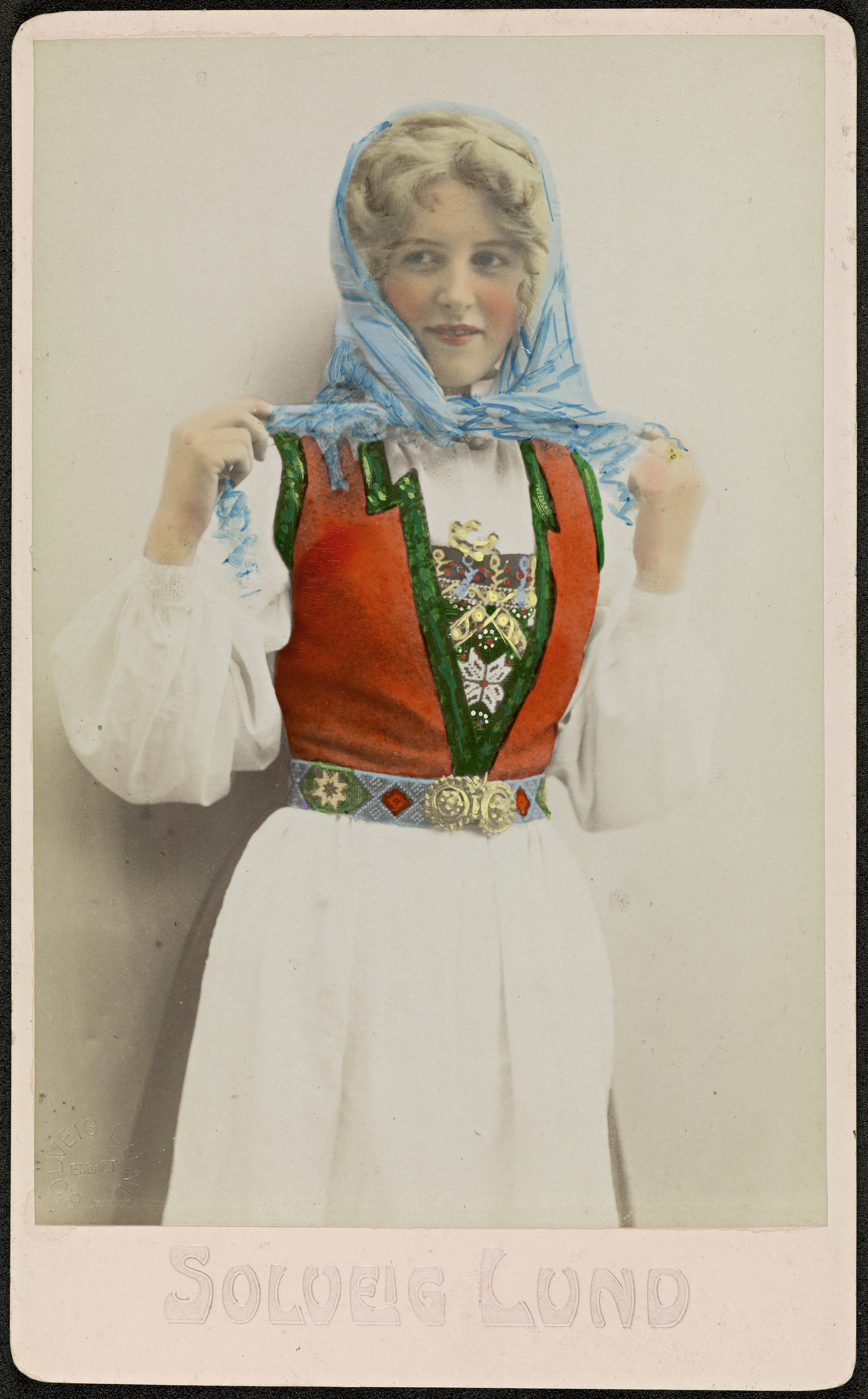
Studioportrett av uidentifisert kvinne i bunad

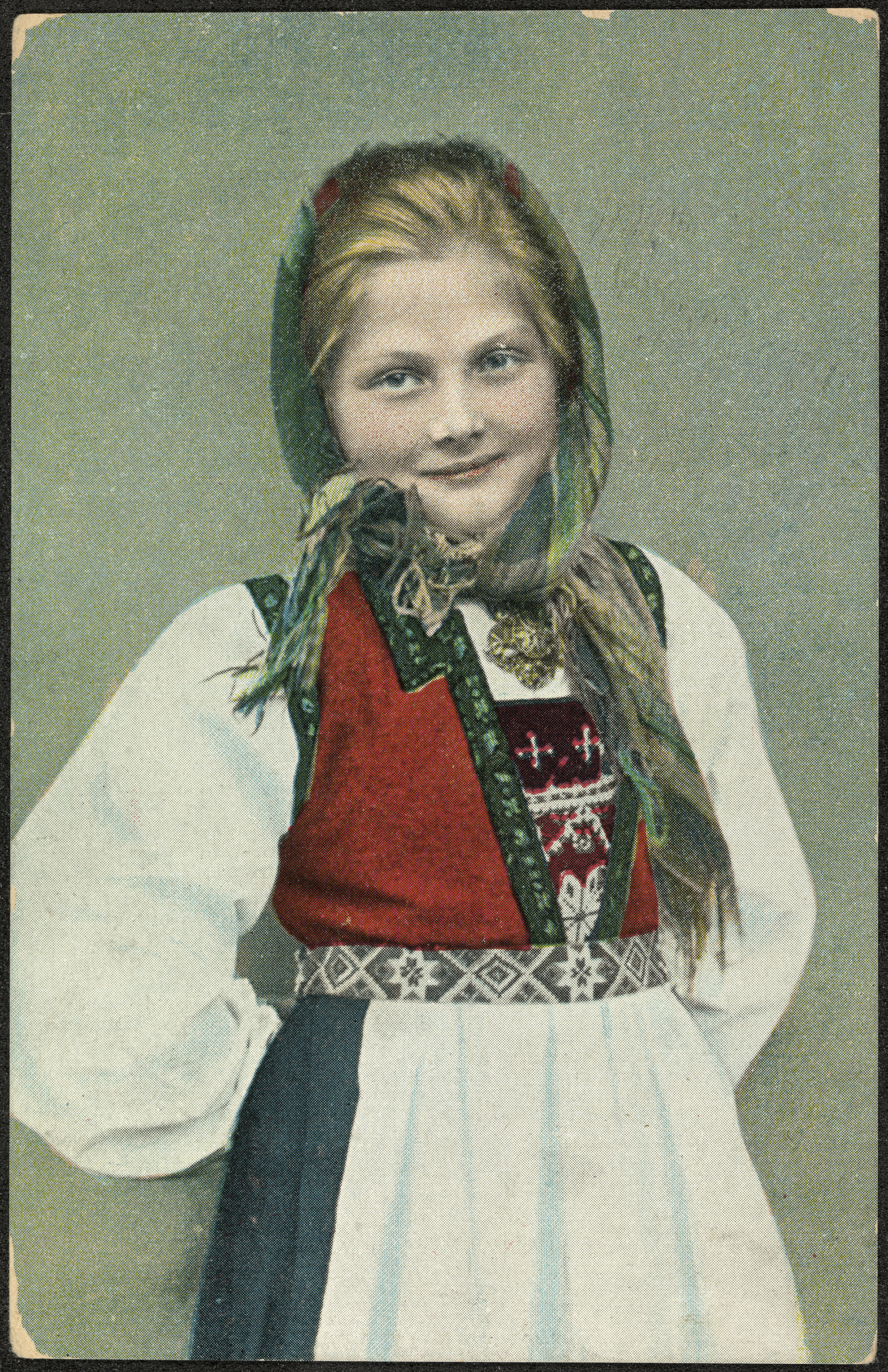
Ung jente i bunad fotografert av Solveig Lund
