= Samuel Mathiassen Føyn =

Norwegian ship-owner and politician

Samuel Mathiassen Føyn (2 November 1786 – 9 August 1854) was a Norwegian ship-owner and politician.

He was elected to the Norwegian Parliament in 1830, 1842 and 1848, representing the constituency of Tønsberg. He worked as a ship-owner, merchant and farmer in that city.

Photographer Solveig Lund was his grand daughter through his daughter Nilsine Othilia Lund nee Føyn.
